= Chery =

Chinese automobile manufacturing company

Chery Automobile Co. Ltd.
- Logo since 2022

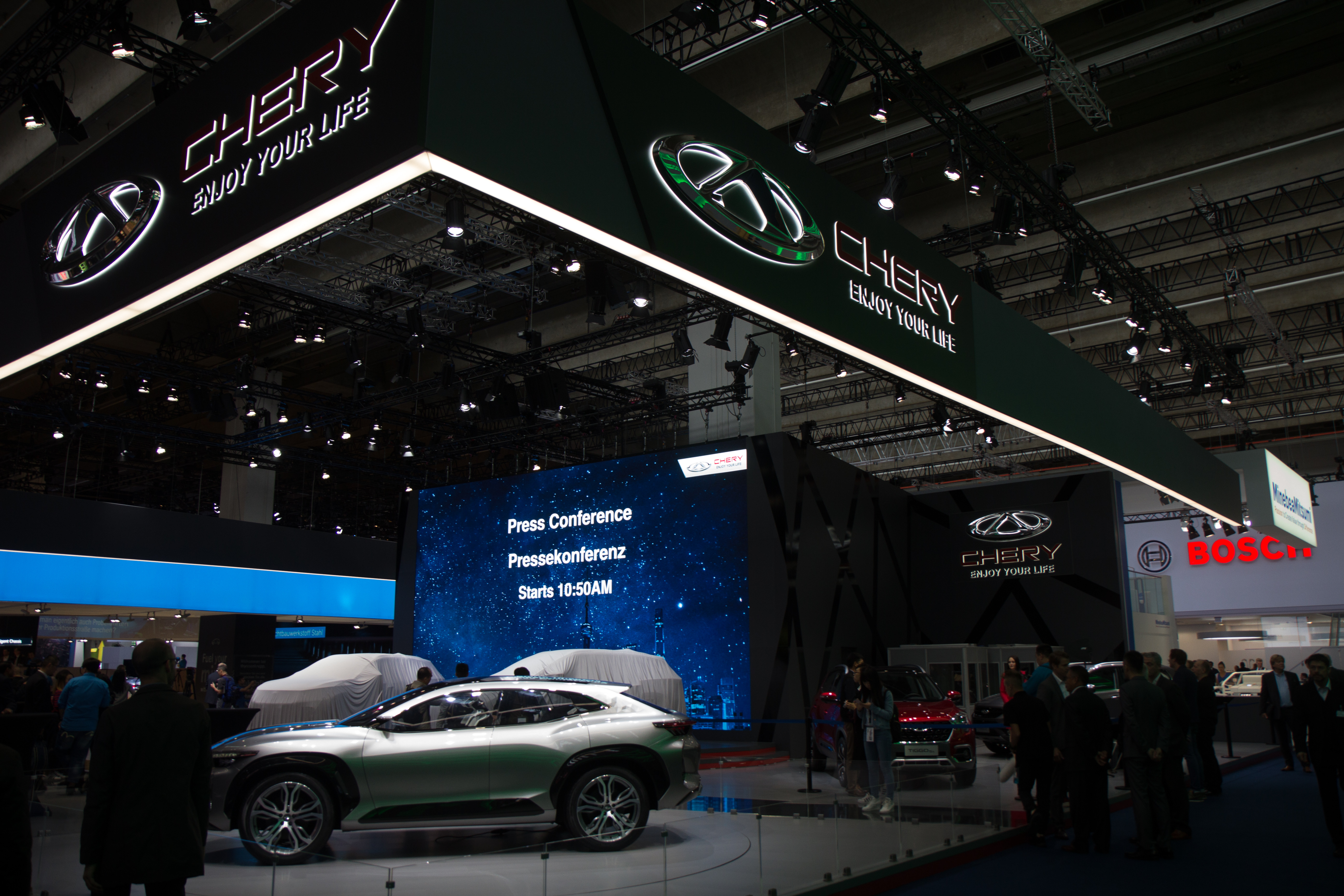
- Chery's booth at 2017 International Motor Show Germany
- Type: Public, State–private mixed ownership
- Traded as: SEHK: 9973
- Industry: Automotive
- Founded: January 1997; 29 years ago
- Headquarters: Wuhu, Anhui, China
- Area served: Worldwide
- Key people: Yin Tongyue (chairman & CEO)
- Products: Automobiles; Engines
- Production output: ▲2,806,393 vehicles (2025)
- Revenue: ▲CN¥480 billion (2024)
- Owner: Anhui and Wuhu government (36.34%); Luxshare (16.83%); CATL (3.15%); Gotion High Tech (1.66%); Employees (18.25%)
- Number of employees: 48,000
- Subsidiaries: Chery Automobile; Chery New Energy; Omoda & Jaecoo; Lepas; Luxeed; Exeed; Jetour; iCar/iCaur; Rely; Soueast; Freelander (licensed from Jaguar Land Rover); Chery Jaguar Land Rover (50%)

Chinese name
- Simplified Chinese: 奇瑞汽车股份有限公司
- Traditional Chinese: 奇瑞汽車股份有限公司
Transcriptions
Standard Mandarin
- Hanyu Pinyin: Qíruì Qìchē Gǔfèn Yǒuxiàn Gōngsī

Chery
- Simplified Chinese: 奇瑞
Transcriptions
Standard Mandarin
- Hanyu Pinyin: Qíruì
- IPA: [tɕʰǐɻwêɪ]
- Website: www.cheryinternational.com; en.cheryholding.com; www.chery.cn (in Chinese)

Chery Automobile Co. Ltd., trading as Chery (Chinese: 奇瑞汽车; pinyin: Qíruì Qìchē), is a Chinese automobile manufacturer. Founded in 1997, it is currently the fifth largest automobile manufacturer group in China, with 2,806,393 vehicles sold in 2025. The company is headquartered in Wuhu, Anhui.

Chery was founded in 1997 by government officials of Wuhu, who appointed Yin Tongyue, the current chairman, as the company's first technical director. Chery launched its first car called the Fengyun in 1999, a copy of the SEAT Toledo Mk1 (itself based on the Volkswagen Golf Mk 2 chassis) using an engine production line from Ford Dagenham. During its early years, Chery used technologies from other manufacturers; some were licensed and others were acquired by reverse engineering. This led to a lawsuit in 2003 filed by General Motors alleging that Chery had copied the design of one of its cars. Chery has since developed and improved its technologies. Since 2006, Chery has produced its engines branded as ACTECO, which it also sells to other manufacturers.

Until 2025, the company used to be a subsidiary of Chery Holding Group Co., Ltd and under the ownership of the Wuhu municipal government. After its IPO in 2025, it was spun-off from the Chery Holding and currently co-owned by the government of Anhui and Wuhu, the employees and several private companies. Since Chery Automobile went IPO, Chery has begun to market itself as "Chery Group", incorporating Chery Holding's commercial vehicles business. In reality, however, "Chery Group" is not an actual legal entity but merely a marketing concept.

The company started exporting cars from China in 2001, ahead of other Chinese manufacturers and has been the top exporter of Chinese brand passenger vehicles since 2003. The company exported 269,154 vehicles in 2021, 451,337 vehicles in 2022, and 937,148 vehicles in 2023, accounting for 52 percent of its overall sales.

Chery invests more heavily in overseas markets than other Chinese manufacturers, and many of its vehicles are assembled outside China using complete or semi-complete knock-down kits. In 2024, Chery Holding Group made its debut on the Fortune Global 500 list, securing the 385th position with a revenue of $39.0917 billion.

Chery adopts a multi-brand strategy by establishing many car brands for different purposes. As of 2024, the company has nine active brands, including the main Chery brand (with Fulwin and Chery New Energy sub-brands for plug-in hybrid and electric cars respectively), Exeed for premium vehicles, Jetour that focuses on SUVs (with Zongheng sub-brand for luxury off-road SUVs respectively), iCar/iCaur for electric SUVs, Luxeed as a collaborative electric car brand with Huawei, Karry for commercial vehicles, and Omoda, Jaecoo, Lepas, Exlantix, and Aiqar for export markets.

The company also operates a joint venture with JLR since 2012 called Chery Jaguar Land Rover to produce Jaguar and Land Rover vehicles in China.

On 25 September 2025, Chery raised about US$1.2 billion in its Hong Kong IPO at HK$30.75 per share, valuing the company at nearly US$23 billion, marking it as one of Hong Kong's largest IPOs of the year.

Chery logo used before 2013

Chery logo used from 2013 until 2022, still used in some overseas markets

== History ==
=== Early years ===
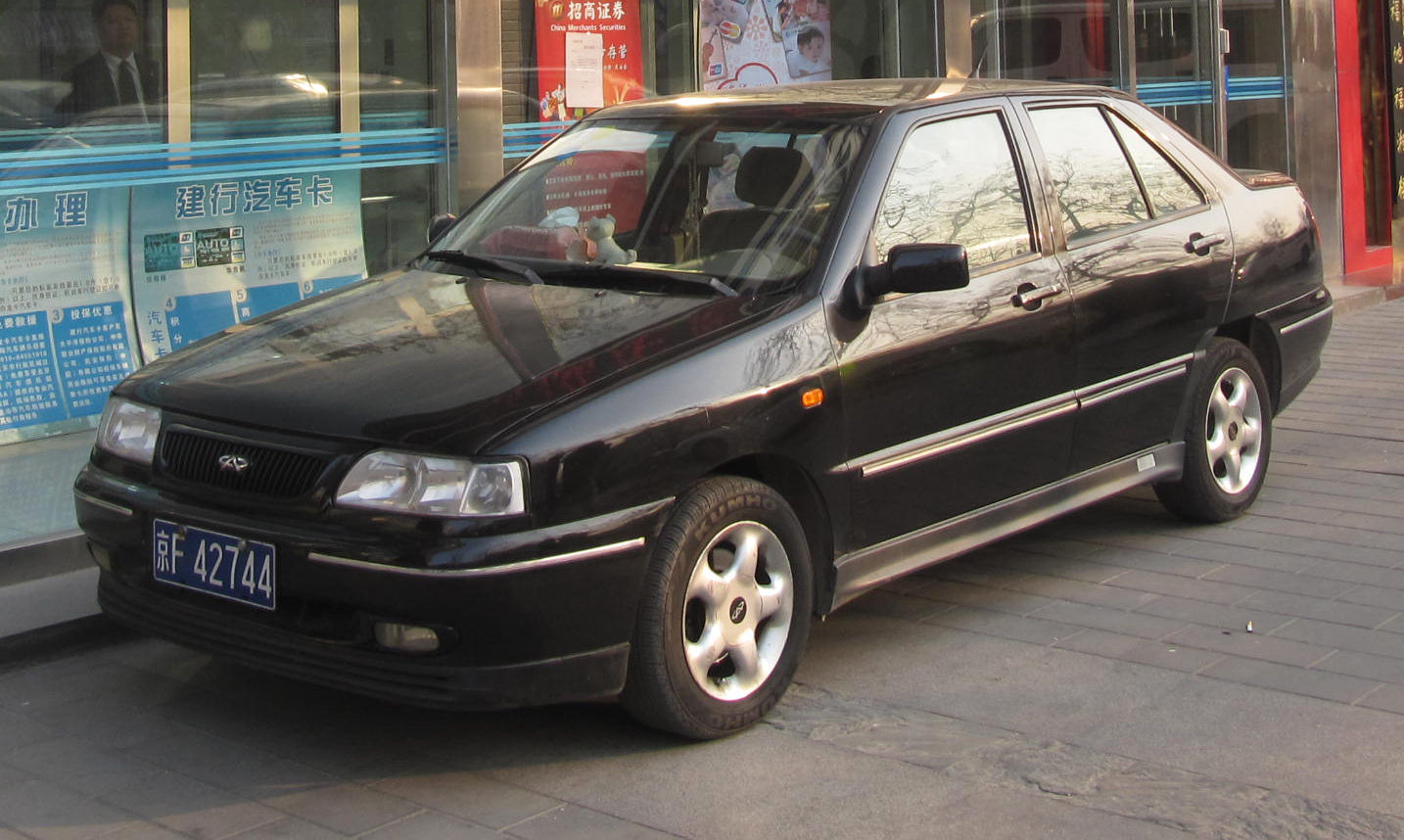
Chery SQR7160 Fengyun

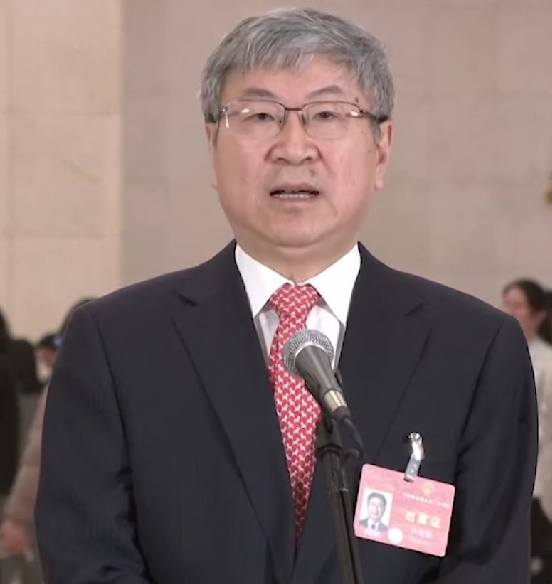
Chery chairman, Yin Tongyue in 2024

Chery was founded on 8 January 1997 as a state-owned enterprise by a group of officials from Wuhu city in Anhui province. The city officials appointed Yin Tongyue (Chinese: 尹同跃), the current Chery chairman, as the company's technical director in 1996. Yin is from Anhui, and at that time was a manager in FAW, holding a position as a workshop director for the FAW-Volkswagen joint venture. The car project was formally incorporated on 18 March 1997 as Anhui Auto Parts Co., Ltd., with substantial funding from the Anhui provincial government, amounting to millions of yuan. The plan was to set up an engine production line and creating a components industry, before initiating car manufacturing operations.

Chery began automobile production in 1999 using a unlicensed copy of the SEAT Toledo bodyshell and the Ford CVH engine manufactured using equipment bought from Ford Dagenham. Called the Fengyun, Chery's first car sold nearly 30,000 units. By 2002, Chery's production and sales exceeded 50,000 units, ranking among the "top eight" in the domestic passenger car industry. However, the company was only awarded a national passenger car production license in 2003, so while its first product rolled off the line in December 1999, it could not be legally sold outside the Anhui province for several years. During that period, Chery solved the problem by piggybacking on a SAIC Motor license until 2003. In this period, SAIC held a 20 percent share in Chery. Ownership was soon sold due to rising tensions between Chery and SAIC partner General Motors, and political pressure from the SAIC management towards Anhui authorities.

=== Expansion period ===
In May 2003, Chery launched its smallest car, the QQ, which became popular due to its design and affordability. Despite its successful sales, it also received quality and durability complaints from owners. In June 2003, American manufacturer General Motors (GM) filed a lawsuit against Chery, alleging that the QQ was a copy of the Daewoo Matiz, a vehicle developed by GM Daewoo. In late 2005, the lawsuit was settled out of court.

GM was not the only manufacturer to have been exasperated with Chery; Volkswagen planned to file a lawsuit against Chery regarding the secret side deals it engaged with VW parts suppliers to produce the Chery Fengyun that was based on the Volkswagen Jetta II. Volkswagen agreed to abstain from a planned lawsuit after Chery offered financial settlement out of court. This entrepreneurial risk-taking led The Wall Street Journal in 2007 to describe Chery's corporate culture as "an odd hybrid of Communist state enterprise and entrepreneurial start-up".

In December 2004, Chery entered an importation agreement with American company Visionary Vehicles, laying the groundwork to introduce five Chery models to US and Canada. Visionary Vehicles was owned by Malcolm Bricklin, widely known as the entrepreneur who brought Yugo cars to the US. Both companies hoped to sell 150,000 vehicles in the US by 2007. Investments were made to ensure compliance with safety regulations, and a dealership network was established across North America. Allegations of breach of contract by Chery and the legal disputes that followed in 2006 disrupted the collaboration between both companies, and Visionary Vehicles ended up winning a lawsuit it brought against Chery in 2013 to recoup losses from the failed deal.In July 2006, Chery launched the QQ in Malaysia through local distributor Alado Corp.

Chery started improving its engineering capabilities, and launching other new products such as the Tiggo SUV and other models. In 2003, Chery started buying 1.4-litre Tritec petrol engines produced in Brazil and jointly developed by BMW and Chrysler. In 2005, the company used a Mitsubishi Motors engine for the Tiggo, which was widely used in the Chinese car industry at that time. Chery started producing its own engine branded as ACTECO since 2006. It is the result of a technical cooperation dating from 2003 with AVL, an Austrian engineering company. In 2007, Chery exported 119,891 vehicles. Starting 2008, Chery supplied ACTECO engines to Fiat, which used the 1.6- and 1.8-liter engines for the Fiat Linea.

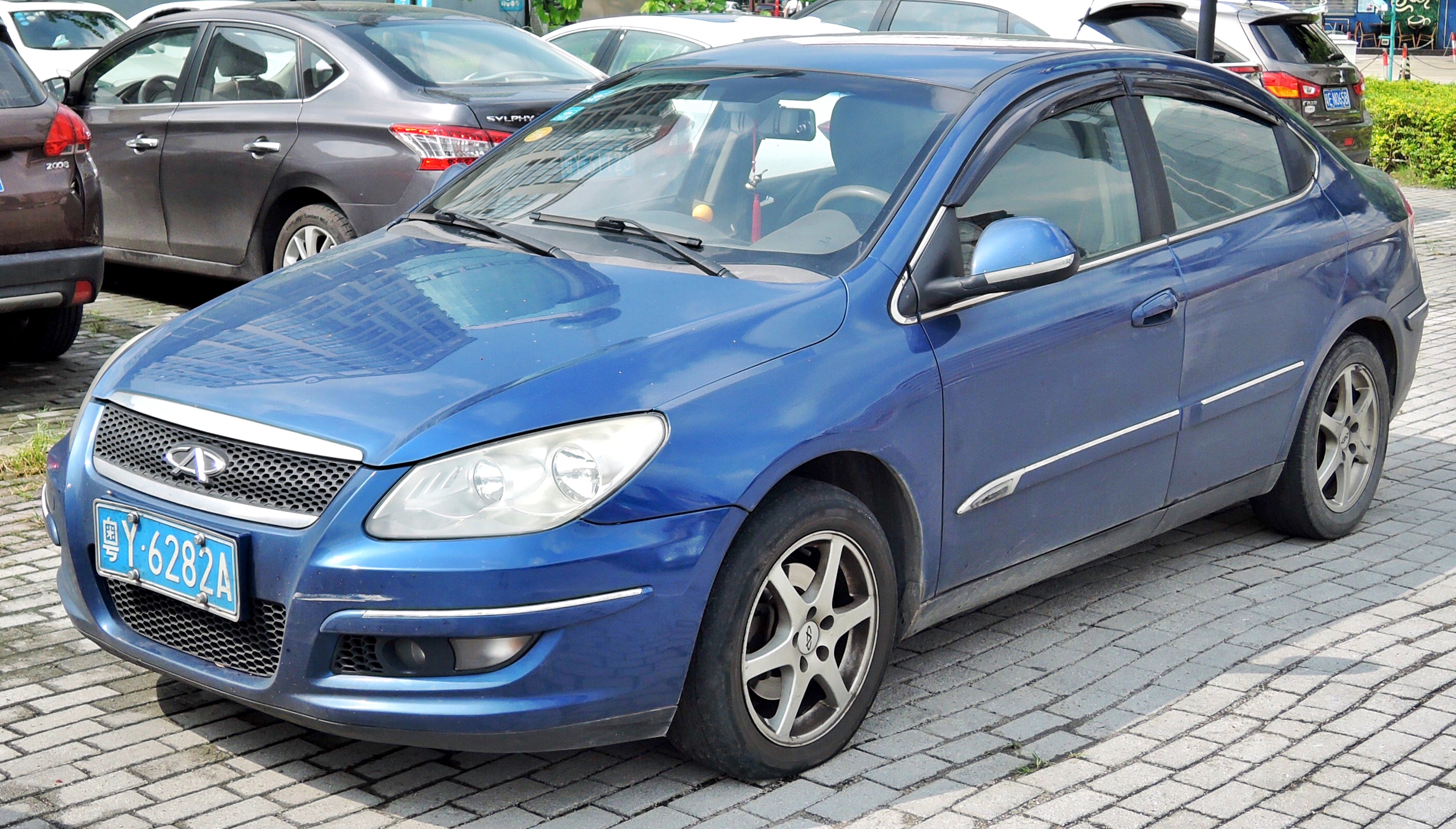
Chery A3

The A3, introduced in August 2007, became a turning point of the brand. The sedan was styled by Pininfarina, and became the first Chinese-developed car to receive a 5-star rating in the China NCAP safety test.

In July 2008, Chery began sales in Argentina. Earlier that year, it had sold cars to 69 countries.

In 2009, Chery produced 508,500 units, and at that time, it had an annual production capacity around 650,000 units. More than 400,000 of its 2009 sales were sedans. In that year, Yin Tongyue announced changes to the company's strategy to become a multi-brand carmaker by introducing three new brands: Karry, Rely, and Riich. Chery also renamed all its cars to Cowin followed by a number, except for the E5, QQ, and Tiggo. It also introduced the Fengyun 2 to replace the SEAT-based sedan. These changes are aimed to eliminate the low-budget image of Chery cars. Later its sprawling production policy and lineup became a problem for Chery. With over 100 new models in the works, Chery decided to cancel the Rely and Riich brands in the fall of 2012. Since then, Chery has entered an adjustment period of "returning to one Chery", and reduced its planned models to around 30.

=== Chery Holding establishment ===
In 2010, Chery entered a new phase with the establishment of Chery Holding Co., Ltd., which became a conglomerate holding company that also operated other businesses such as financial services, real estate, and service sector. By 2024, the holding company consists of over 300 member companies.

Chery became the seventh-most productive Chinese vehicle manufacturer in 2010 by selling nearly 700,000 units. Slipping sales marked 2011 and 2012; in these years, the company produced more than 640,000 and near 590,000 units, respectively, and it moved from a seventh to a tenth-place ranking. The company in 2011 exported around 25% of its total production. In September 2010, Chery signed a framework agreement with the Brazilian state of São Paulo to build a manufacturing plant in Jacareí. In 2011, Chery built its first fully owned manufacturing plant outside of China, located in Jacareí, Brazil. It went operational in 2014.The Chery TX concept won Car Design News' Best Concept Car award at the 2013 Geneva Motor Show, becoming the first Chinese-branded vehicle to do so.

Since the late 2000s period, Chery also began to actively seek a partnership with foreign carmakers. Several possible tie-ups with both Chrysler and Fiat were explored, but fell through. In mid-2011, the company signed an agreement with Fuji Heavy Industries (currently Subaru Corporation) to establish a manufacturing joint venture in China, with a production site planned in Dalian, Liaoning. The planned joint venture failed to receive an approval from the Chinese government despite multiple attempts. Chery started partnering with Jaguar Land Rover (JLR) in March 2012, which was looking to produce cars in China through a mandatory 50–50 joint venturer with a local company. The joint venture was formalised as Chery Jaguar Land Rover in November 2012. Its first product, a Range Rover Evoque, rolled off the production line in October 2014 from the newly built plant in Changshu, Jiangsu. Chery also began manufacturing a revived version of the Moke under an agreement with JLR since 2013. Its design evokes the classic Mini Moke built from 1964 until 1993.

Chery was also involved with the establishment of Qoros, a joint venture formed in 2007 with Kenon Holdings based in Singapore and owned by Israeli investors, and started selling the Qoros 3 sedan in 2013. Qoros was sold off in 2018, and faced bankruptcy in 2022.

In 2014, Chery revived its multi-brand strategy by establishing Cowin as a separate brand, which is positioned as a low-budget offering. The brand was partially sold in 2018. Another brand that was established by Chery is Exeed, which is positioned in the premium segment. The brand was introduced in September 2017 at the International Motor Show Germany in Frankfurt by showcasing the TX concept vehicle. The first production model from Exeed was the Exeed TX/TXL mid-size SUV in March 2019. In January 2018, Chery introduced another brand called Jetour at an event in Beijing, which focuses on "value for money" mid-size SUVs and targets Chinese families living in tier-three and tier-four cities who travel often.

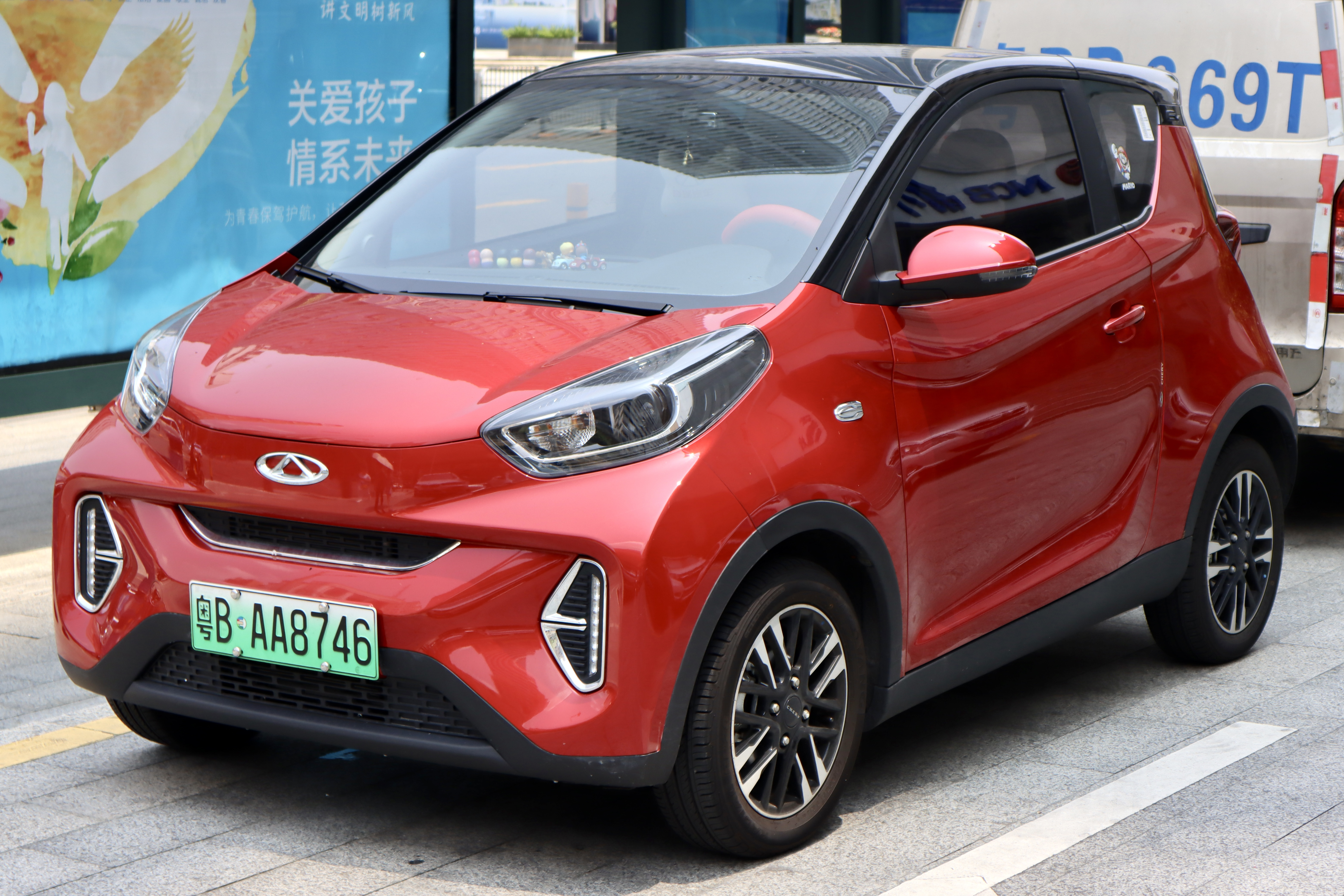
Chery eQ1, the best-selling EV from Chery since its inception

Chery started early in producing electric vehicles (EVs) by introducing its first EV in 2009, which is an electrified version of the original Chery QQ. The company established an EV division called Chery New Energy in 2010. Following this, Chery released the Chery eQ in 2014, an EV variant of the second-generation QQ, and later launched the eQ1 in 2016. In December 2015, Chery produced its five-millionth vehicle, becoming the first Chinese automaker to do so. The eQ1 went on sale in 2017, and became one of the most popular electric car in China until 2020, when rivals such as the Wuling Hongguang Mini EV became available. In June 2021, Chery produced its 200,000th eQ1.

=== Rapid growth period ===
Chery attempted to enter the US for the second time in February 2020, when the company struck a deal with a California-based dealership group HAAH Automotive to sell Exeed and Chery Tiggo models in the country by 2022. The vehicles were planned be rebranded as Vantas and T-GO respectively, and would be assembled at an American plant using both domestic and imported parts. The plans were cancelled in mid-2021 as HAAH filed for bankruptcy.

In 2021, Chery announced the "Double 50" strategic plan that aimed to export 500,000 vehicles and to achieve an export revenue of US $5 billion by 2025. The company ended up surpassing the plan by a large margin by exporting 937,148 vehicles in 2023.

The company started entering or reentering markets in this period. Chery resumed operations in South Africa in late 2021 after years of absence. In 2022, Chery entered the Mexican market as Chirey due to trademark reasons, as Malcolm Bricklin held the rights for the Chery name in North America. Other markets entered in 2022 included Malaysia, Indonesia, and Turkey. Chery re-entered the Australian market in 2023, after briefly selling cars there in the early 2010s. Its Exeed brand started sales in the Middle East in 2022.

In 2023, Chery launched four new brands and several new product lines. In April, it launched a new brand called iCar which mainly sells electric SUVs that targets young customers, and the Sterra electric product line (Exlantix for export markets) under its Exeed brand. The company also started a partnership Huawei under the Harmony Intelligent Mobility Alliance (HIMA), where Chery supplied HIMA with electric vehicles under the new Luxeed brand. Luxeed's first product is the Luxeed S7, which is the first car to have the Harmony OS 4 on board.

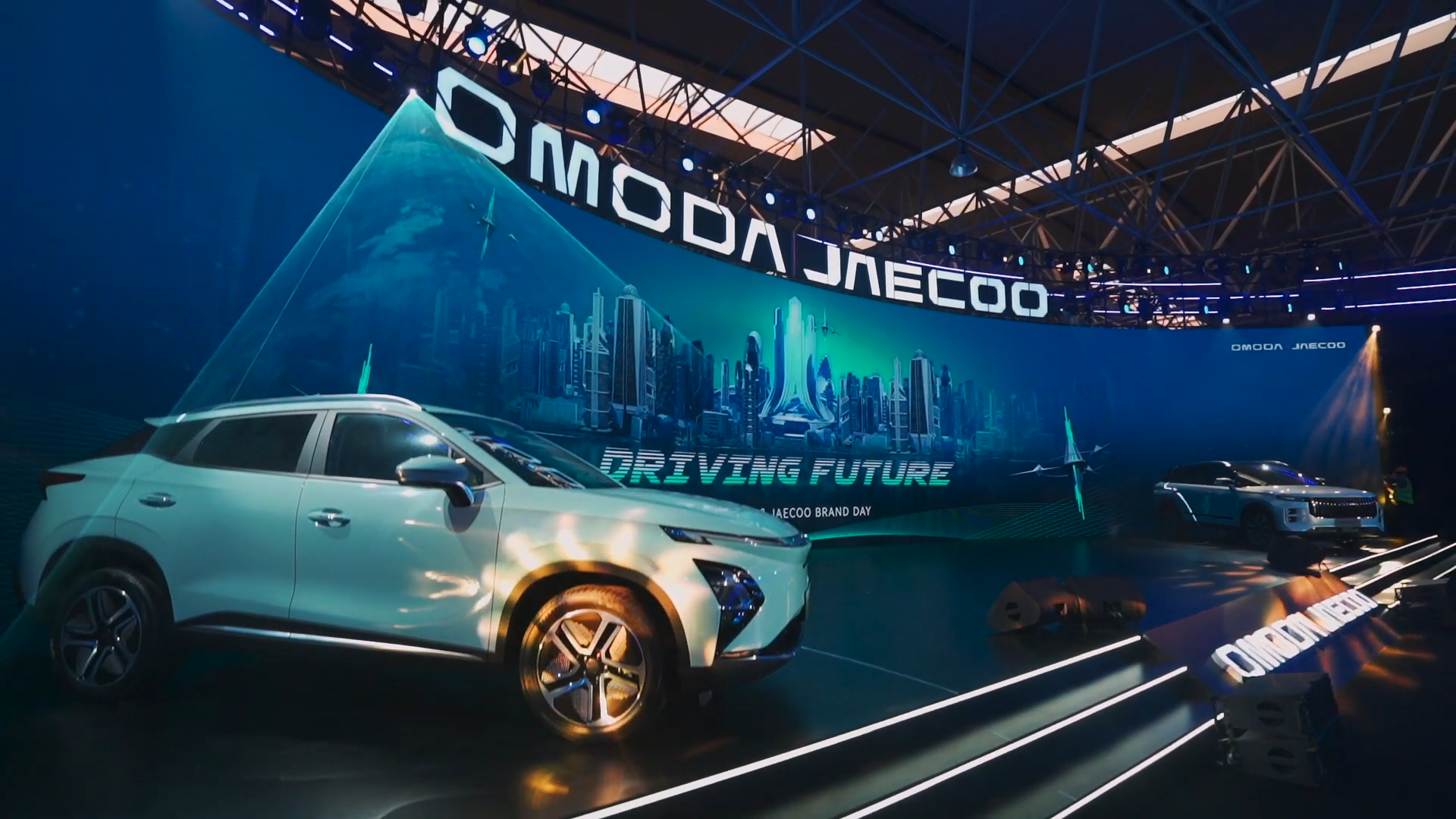
Omoda and Jaecoo global brand launch in Wuhu, Anhui

In April 2023, Chery launched another two new brands in a ceremony held in Wuhu, Anhui called Omoda and Jaecoo. Both brands are only marketed outside China to support Chery's export strategy. The two brands combined (referred to as "O&J" brands) were targeted to reach annual global sales of 1,400,000 units by 2030. Also in 2023, Chery also announced its new high-performance plug-in hybrid platform marketed as "Chery Dual Mode" (C-DM) to be introduced into most of its models. The plug-in hybrid system became available in Chery vehicles carrying the Fulwin sub-brand, Jetour vehicles under the Shanhai sub-brand, and Exeed vehicles.

In January 2024, Chery has signed strategic cooperation framework agreements with Nio to establish cooperation in battery standards, battery swapping technology, the construction of battery swapping service networks, and operation.

In March 2024, Chery fully acquired Soueast, a carmaker based in Fujian that was a subsidiary of Fujian Motors Group. The production facility of Soueast is used for producing Jetour brand vehicles.

In June 2024, Jaguar Land Rover (JLR) and Chery signed a letter of intent in electric vehicle cooperation. JLR will license the Freelander nameplate to Chery Jaguar Land Rover to produce EVs based on an Exeed EV platform called the E0X. Freelander as a brand will be separate from JLR's 'House of Brands' portfolio or Chery's brand line-up. Freelander vehicles will be sold in China, with plans for global exports. In November 2024, Chery established the FR Brand Division to lead the development and marketing of Freelander-branded models.

In October 2024, South Korean manufacturer KG Mobility, formerly SsangYong Motor, signed an agreement with Chery to co-develop electrified vehicles for global markets. KG Mobility will receive the T2X platform developed by Chery.

In October 2024, Chery Holdings Limited was reported to be considering listing its automobile division in Hong Kong, with an estimated valuation of approximately US$7.1 billion (around RMB 50 billion).

In April 2025, Chery launched its new hybrid system called Kunpeng Super Hybrid CDM/CEM. In the same month, the company announced the revival of the Rely brand as its electric pickup line, offering ICE, BEV, EREV, and PHEV variants. Chery also introduced a new brand, Lepas, aimed at overseas markets, and introduced iCaur, the export market name of the iCar brand.

In July 2025, Chery restructured its brand in the Chinese market by establishing four major divisions: the Exeed Division, the Tiggo & Arrizo Division, the Fulwin Division, and the QQ Division. Jetour, iCar, and Luxeed brands will continue to operate independently due to differences in market positioning and cooperation models.

=== Stake restructuring and IPO ===
In January 2025, to meet the IPO requirements for Chery, Chery Holding Group, the majority shareholder of Chery Automobile, completed a "shareholder downchain restructuring", distributing its 42.32% equity stake proportionally to its shareholders. Following this restructuring, the three major shareholders—Wuhu Investment Holding (Wuhu SASAC), Luxshare Precision, and Ruichuang (an employee stock ownership company)—now hold 21.17%, 16.83%, and 11.51% of Chery's equity, respectively. Among Chery's other shareholders, Anhui Credit Guarantee (9.97%) and Anhui Investment Holding (5.2%) are both state-owned entities under Anhui provincial government, while CATL (3.15%) and Gotion High-tech (1.66%) are strategic partners from the industry chain.

On 25 September 2025, Chery raised about US$1.2 billion in its Hong Kong IPO at HK$30.75 per share, valuing the company at nearly US$23 billion, with the stock rising over 11% on debut and marking it as one of Hong Kong's largest IPOs of the year.

Following the IPO of Chery Automobile, Chery Holding no longer holds shares in Chery Automobile. Chery Holding currently only retains the commercial vehicle business and has no capital ties with Chery Automobile, effectively completing a spin-off.

In October 2025, Chery marked the delivery of its five-millionth export vehicle at a ceremony in Warsaw, Poland.

Major stakeholders of Chery Automobile after 2025
| Capital type | Stakeholder | Percentage | Note |
|---|---|---|---|
| State-owned (36.34%) | Wuhu Investment Holding | 21.17% | Wuhu SASAC, Wuhu municipal government |
| State-owned (36.34%) | Anhui Credit Guarantee | 9.97% | State-owned financial institute by Anhui provincial government |
| State-owned (36.34%) | Anhui Investment Holding | 5.2% | Anhui SASAC, Anhui provincial government |
| Private (21.64%) | Luxshare Precision | 16.83% | |
| Private (21.64%) | CATL | 3.15% | |
| Private (21.64%) | Gotion High-tech | 1.66% | |
| Employee owned (18.25%) | Ruichuang | 11.51% | Employee stock ownership company, Yin Tongyue holds 87.49% of it. By penetration, Yin Tongyue personally holds 10.07% of Chery |
| Employee owned (18.25%) | Ruiheng | 3.37% | Employee stock ownership company |
| Employee owned (18.25%) | Zhenrui | 3.37% | Employee stock ownership company |

== Operations ==
Chery's main production base in mainland China is located in Anhui. As of 2007, the company had two auto-making production bases, two engine-making facilities, and a transmission production plant. Another car-making production base located in Dalian, Liaoning province, became operational in 2012.

=== Research and development ===
Chery invests around 7% of its total sales in research and development, and, as of 2011, had over 4,000 patents. It has R&D facilities in Wuhu, Anhui province, and Changshu, Jiangsu province. Chery has cooperative agreements with many foreign component firms, including the American ArvinMeritor, American Autoliv, American Delphi Automotive, the Australian company Futuris, German Robert Bosch GmbH, American PPG Industries, German Siemens VDO, French Valeo, and the American Visteon. Some have helped Chery establish a local supply chain.

Chery established a R&D center at Raunheim, Germany near Frankfurt in 2018, which went operational in 2019 under Chery Europe GmbH. The facility employed around 30 to 50 people in its initial phase. In early 2024, Chery announced the expansion of the R&D center in Raunheim and will double the number of employees at the center to 120 by the end of 2024. The facility has gradually grown into one of Chery's most important R&D and design bases over the past five years.

By late 2023, Chery had applied for over 29,000 patents.

=== Design ===
In 2012, Chery hired former General Motors designer James Hope. Former Porsche designer Hakan Saracoglu joined Chery's design team in 2013. Saracoglu reshaped and guided the brand's design direction, steering it away from the budget perception associated with its popular Chery QQ. In 2018, former Mazda Europe design director Kevin Rice joined Chery to lead its design centre in Raunheim, Germany. Rice left the company in 2020 to join Pininfarina in Turin, Italy, and his position was replaced by Steve Eum, who hailed from General Motors and joined Chery in 2017.

As of 2023, Chery has six design centers, including one in Wuhu, two in Shanghai, and another in Raunheim, Germany.

== Leadership ==
=== Chairman ===
- Yin Tongyue (since 1997)

=== Executive Directors/CEOs ===
- Jim Chyou (2011–2017)
- Shaodong Zhu (2024–present)

== Products and brands ==
=== Chery ===
Chery is the passenger vehicle marque of Chery Automobile, marketed internationally as CHERY. Its model lines include the Arrizo sedans, the Tiggo SUVs and the Himla pick-up. Reviewers have described the brand's Tiggo SUV range as practical and family-oriented. In April 2025, Chery launched Chery Family Care, a global customer service brand.

==== Cars ====
- Chery Arrizo 8 (2022–present), mid-size sedan
  - Chery Arrizo 8 CSH (2025–present), export-market PHEV variant of Arrizo 8
- Chery Arrizo 7 (upcoming), mid-size sedan
- Chery Arrizo 5 Plus (2018–present), compact sedan
  - Chery Arrizo 5 GT (2022–present), variant of Arrizo 5 Plus
- Chery Arrizo 5 (2016–present), subcompact sedan
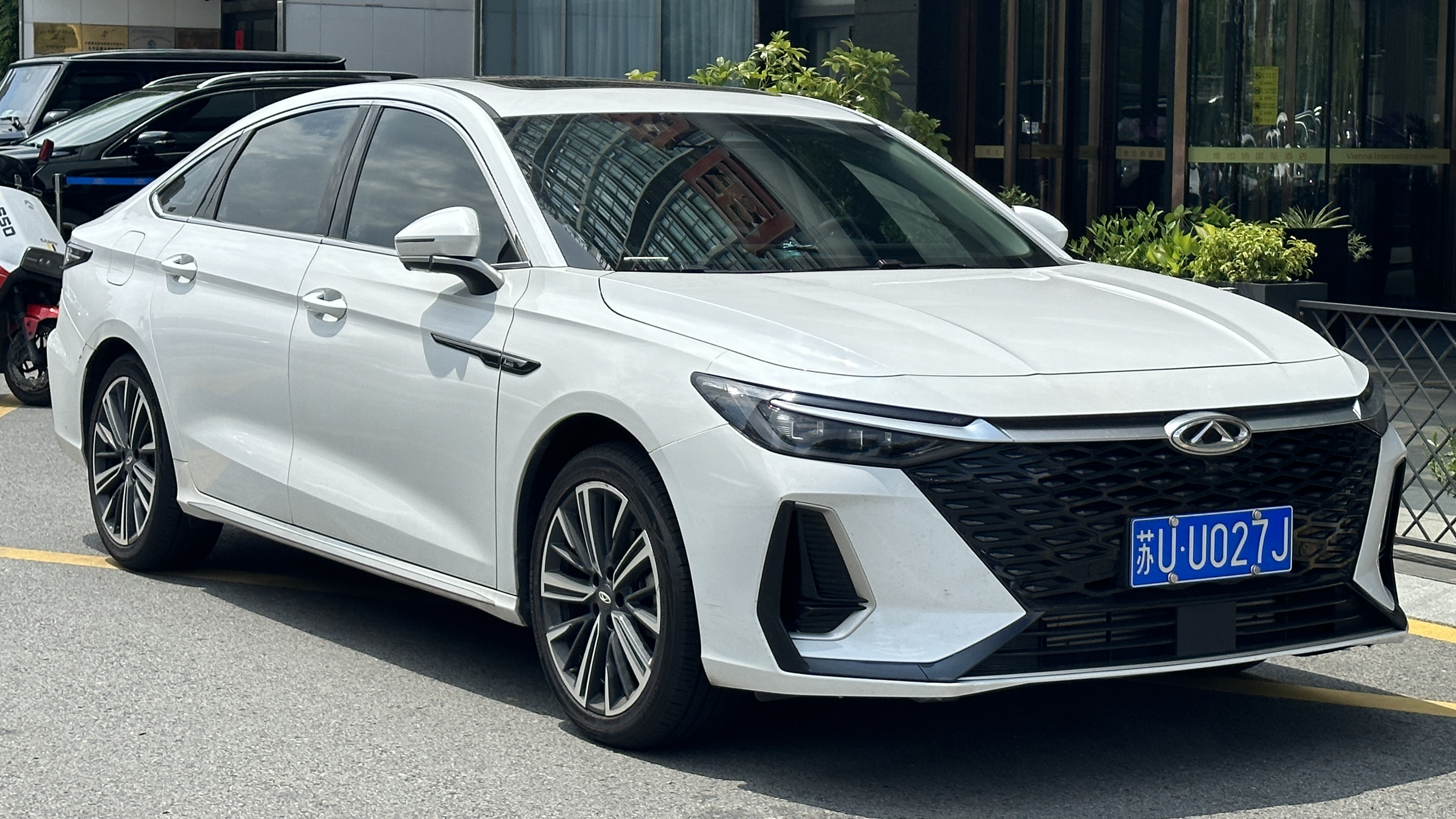
Chery Arrizo 8

Chery Arrizo 8 CSH

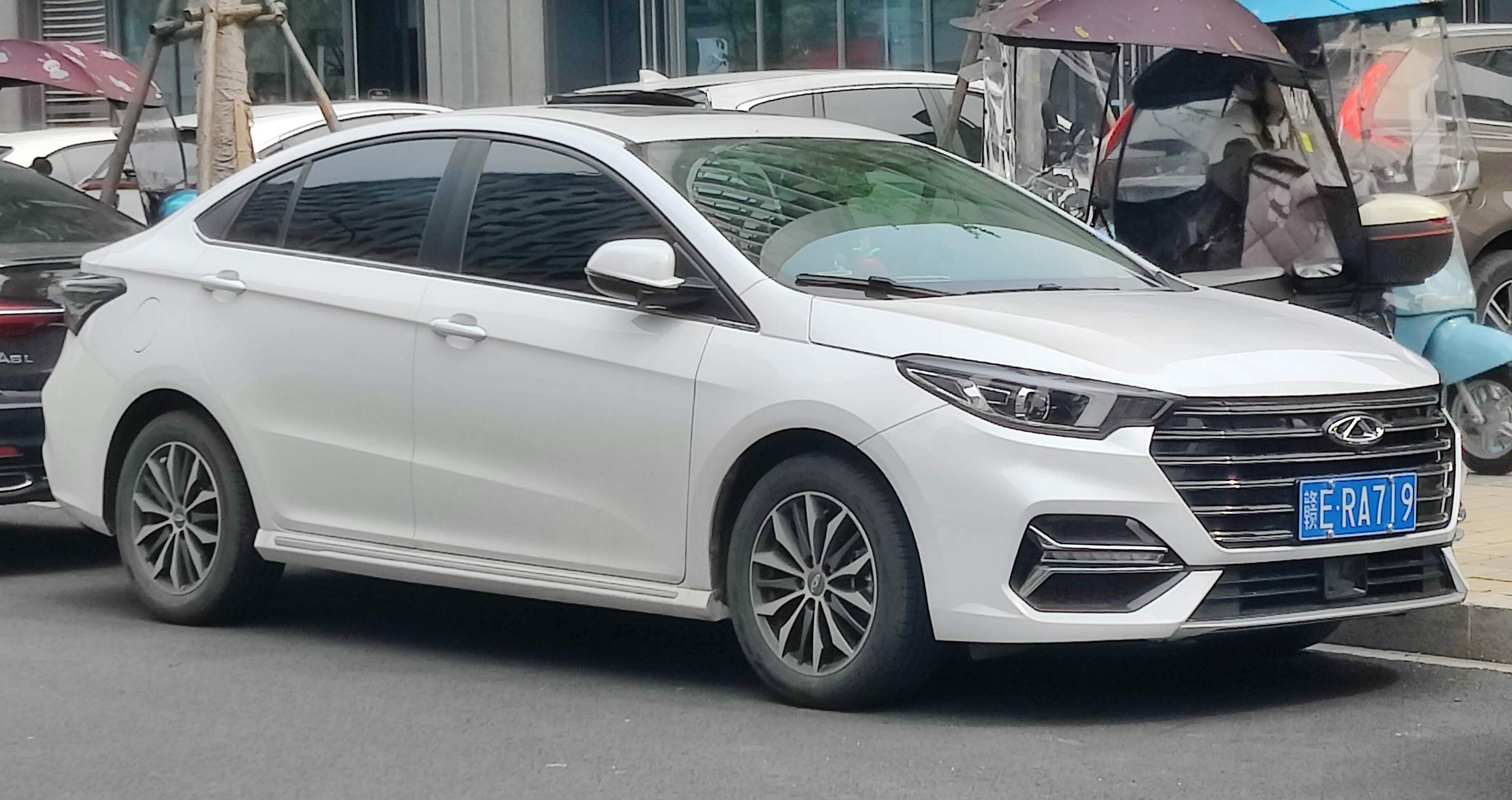
Chery Arrizo 5 Plus

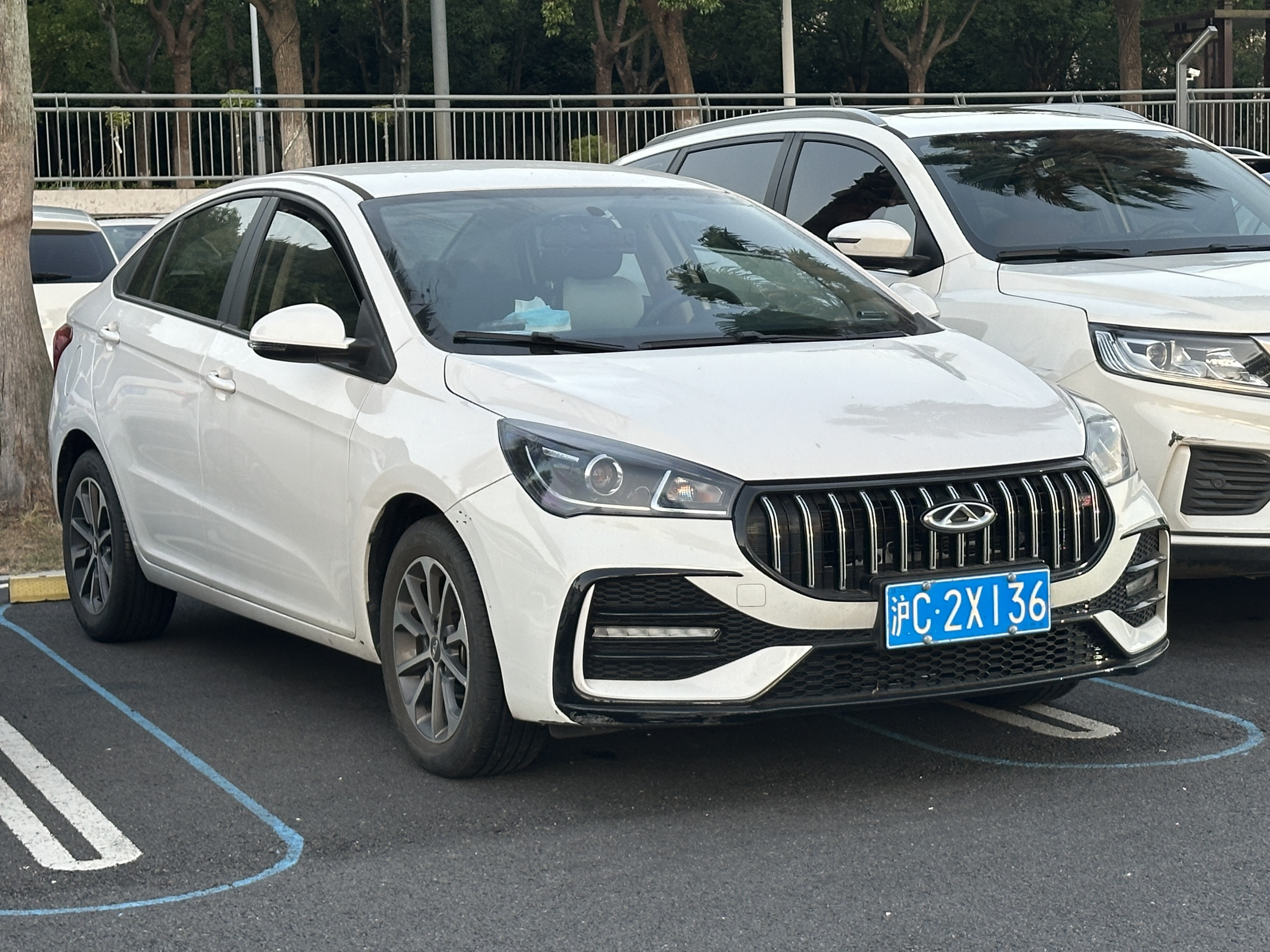
Chery Arrizo 5

==== SUV ====
- Chery Tiggo V (2026–present), mid-size SUT
- Chery Tiggo 9L (upcoming), full-size SUV
- Chery Tiggo 9 (2023–present), mid-size SUV
  - Chery Tiggo 9 CSH (2025–present), export-market PHEV variant of Tiggo 9
- Chery Tiggo 9X (2024–present), mid-size SUV
- Chery Tiggo 8 (2018–present), mid-size SUV
  - Chery Tiggo 8 CSH (2025–present), export-market PHEV variant of Tiggo 8
- Chery Tiggo 7L (2026–present), compact SUV
- Chery Tiggo 7 (2016–present), compact SUV
  - Chery Tiggo 7 High Energy (2024–present), compact SUV, restyled Tansuo 06
  - Chery Tiggo 7 CSH (2025–present), export-market PHEV variant of the Tiggo 7; a full-hybrid (HEV) version using the same Chery Super Hybrid technology went on sale in 2026.
- Chery Omoda 5 (2022–present), compact SUV
  - Chery Omoda E5 (2023–present), export-only EV variant of Omoda 5
- Chery Tiggo 5 Sport (2026–present), subcompact SUV
- Chery Tiggo 5x (2017–present), subcompact SUV
  - Chery Tiggo 5x High Energy (2024–present), subcompact SUV, restyled Omoda 5
  - Chery Tiggo 4 CSH (2025–present), export-market HEV variant of the Tiggo 4, sold in Malaysia as the Tiggo Cross
- Chery Tiggo 3x (2016–present), subcompact SUV
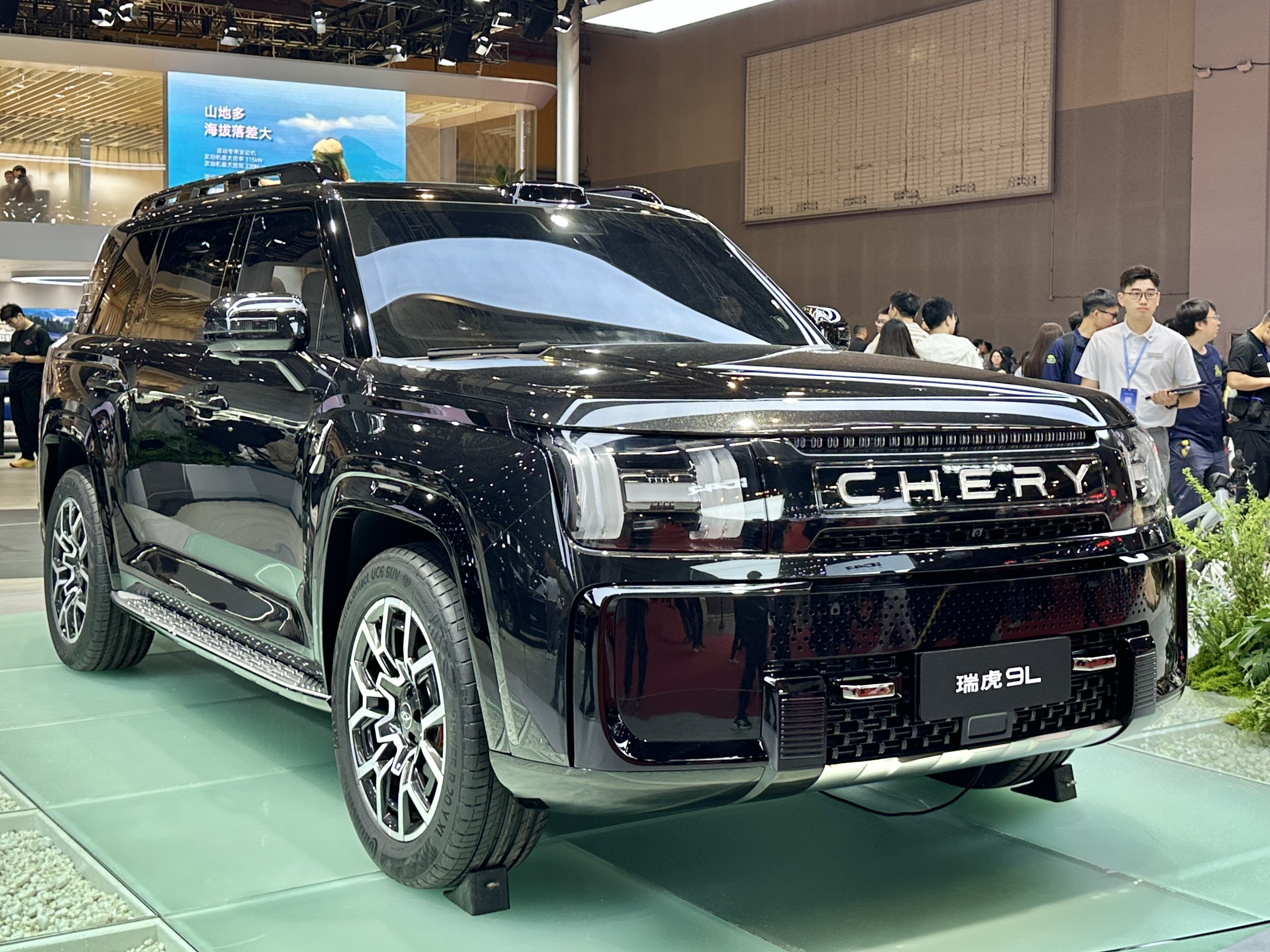
Chery Tiggo 9L

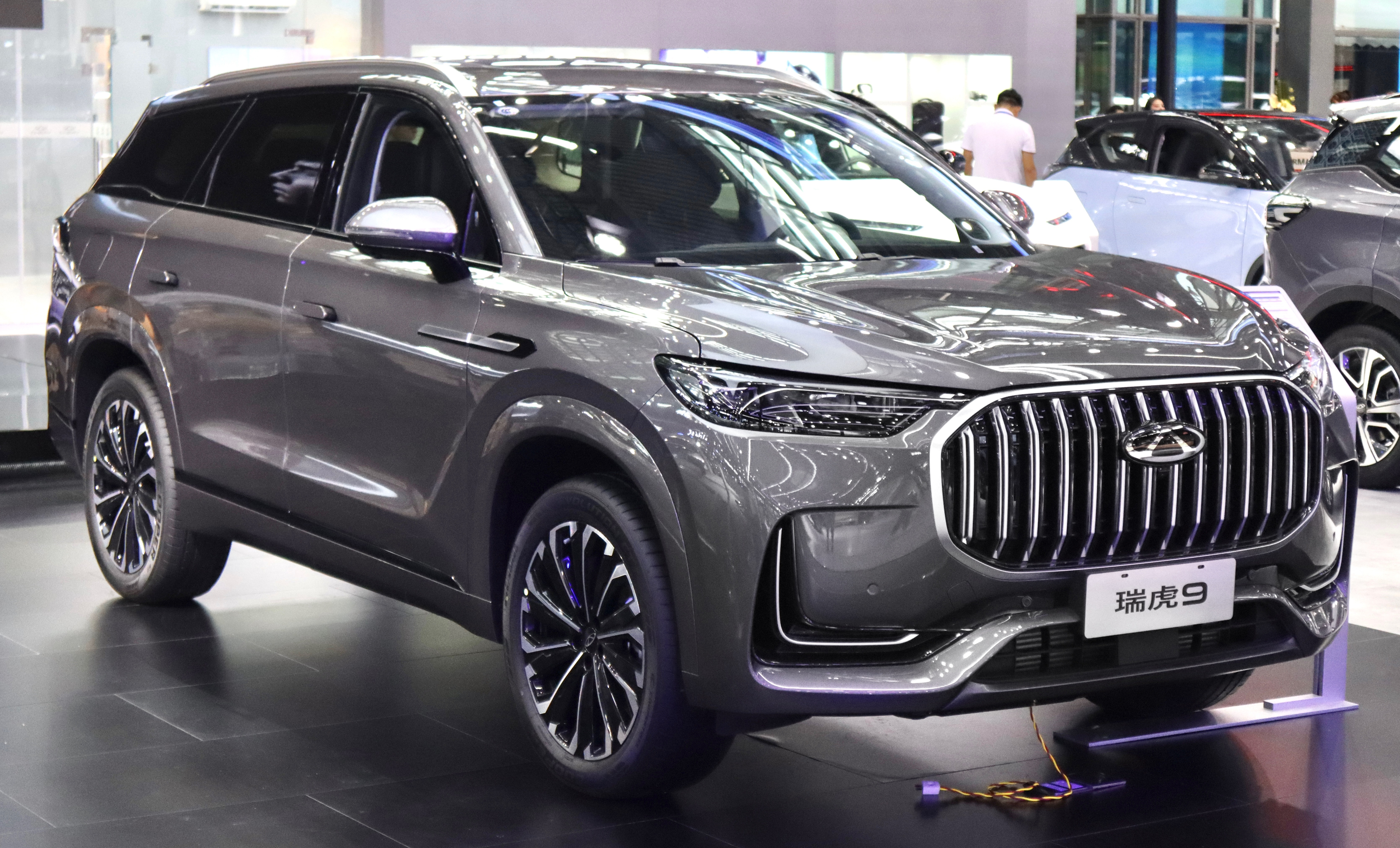
Chery Tiggo 9

Chery Tiggo 9 CSH

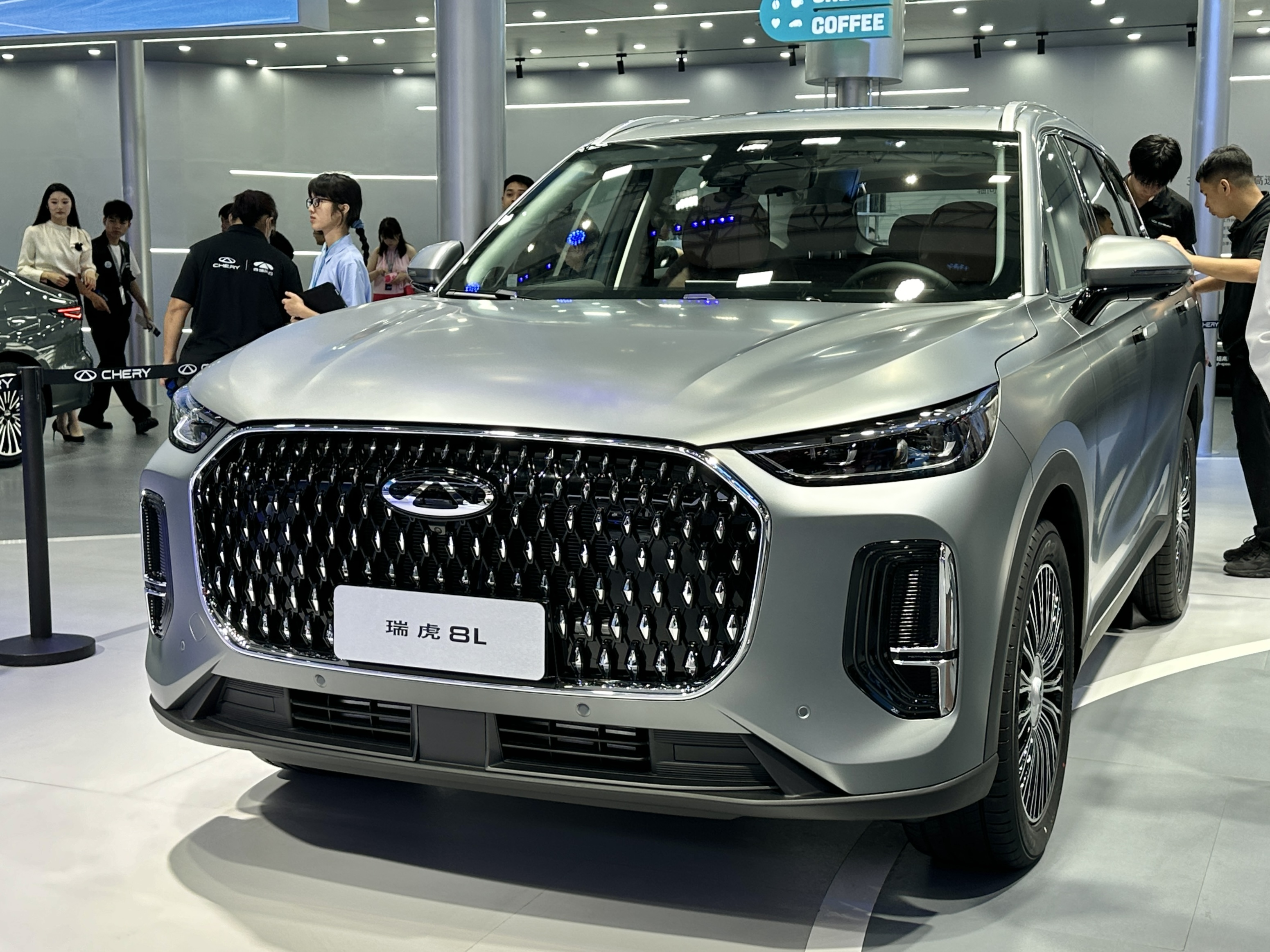
Chery Tiggo 8L

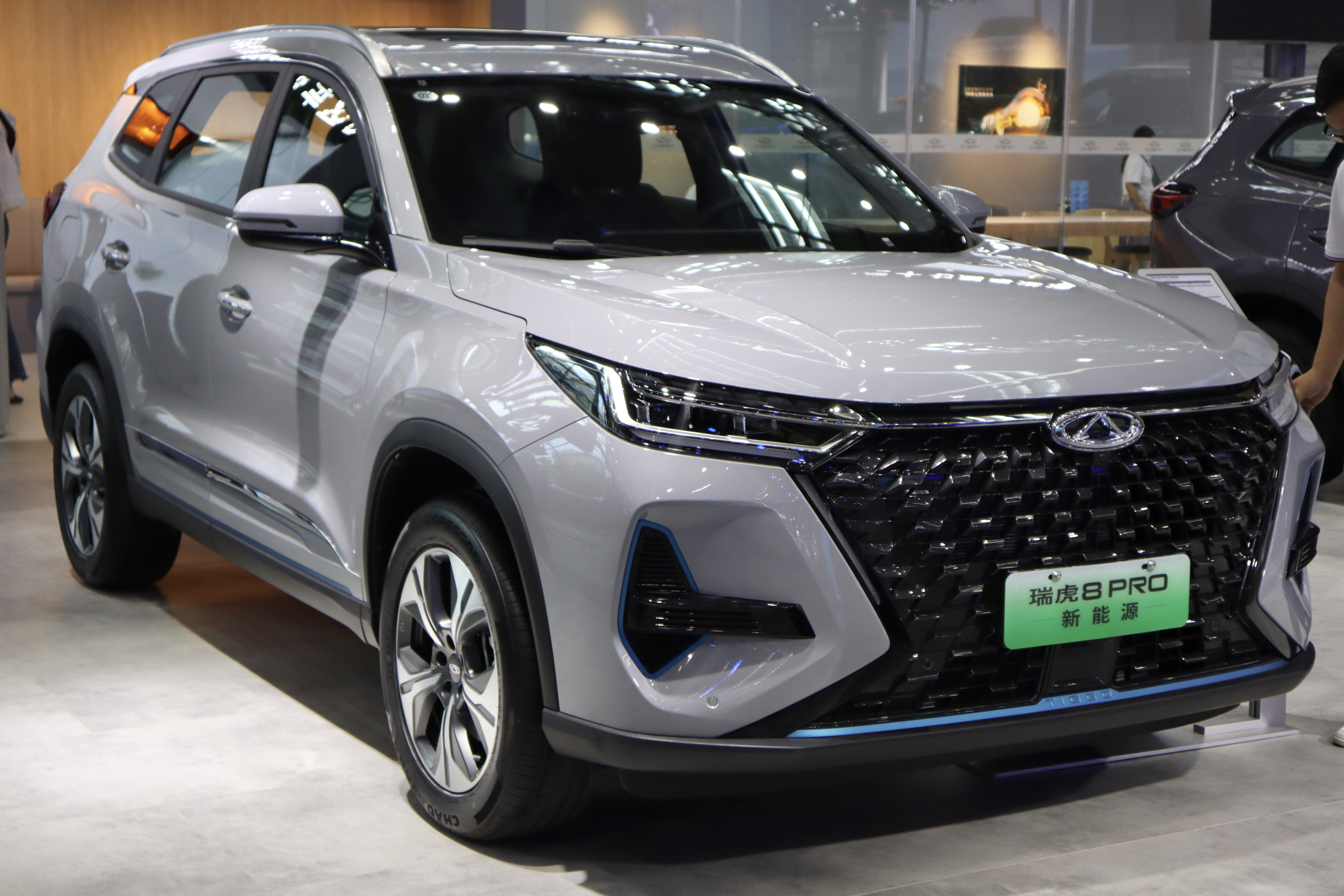
Chery Tiggo 8 Pro

Chery Tiggo 8 CSH

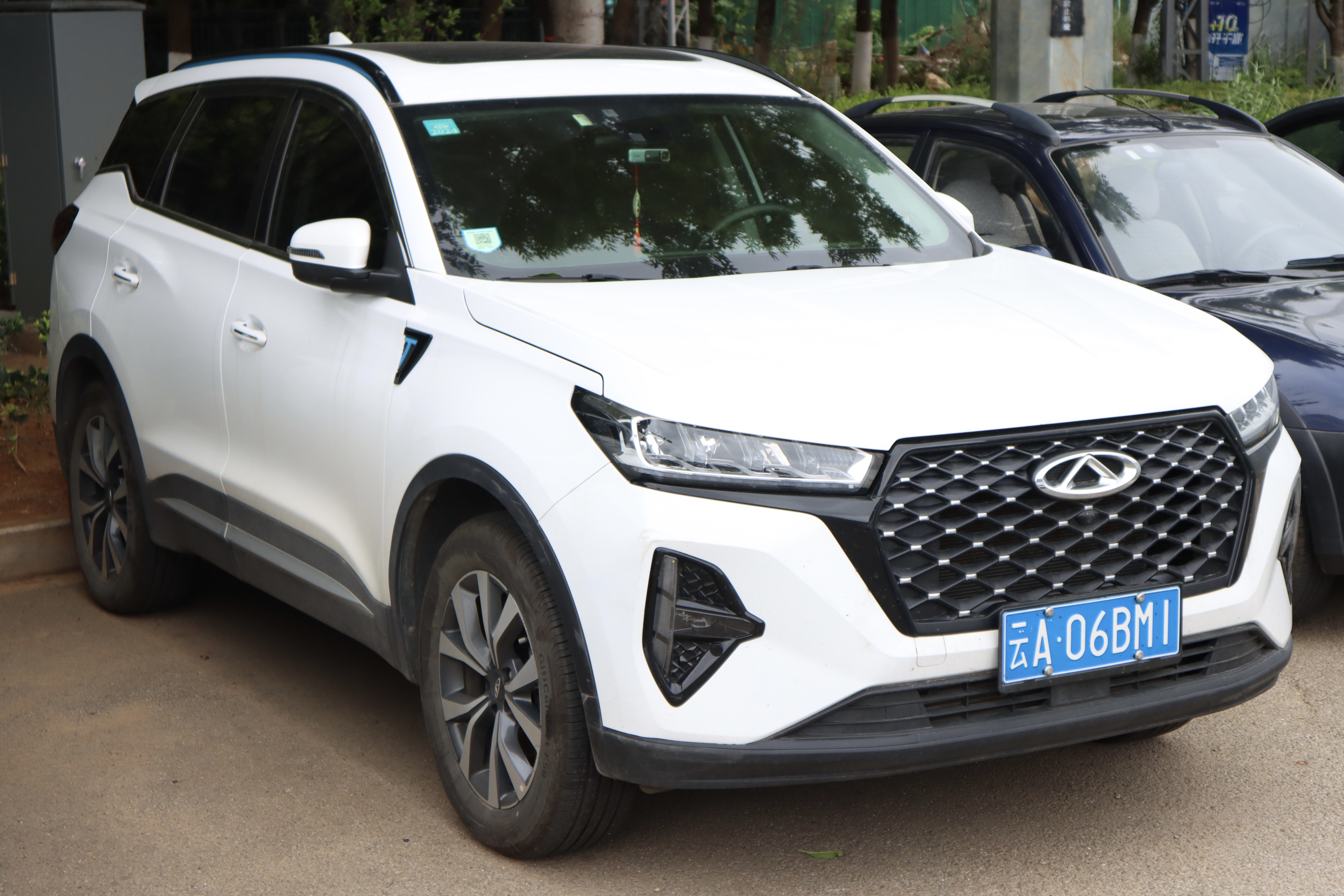
Chery Tiggo 7 Plus

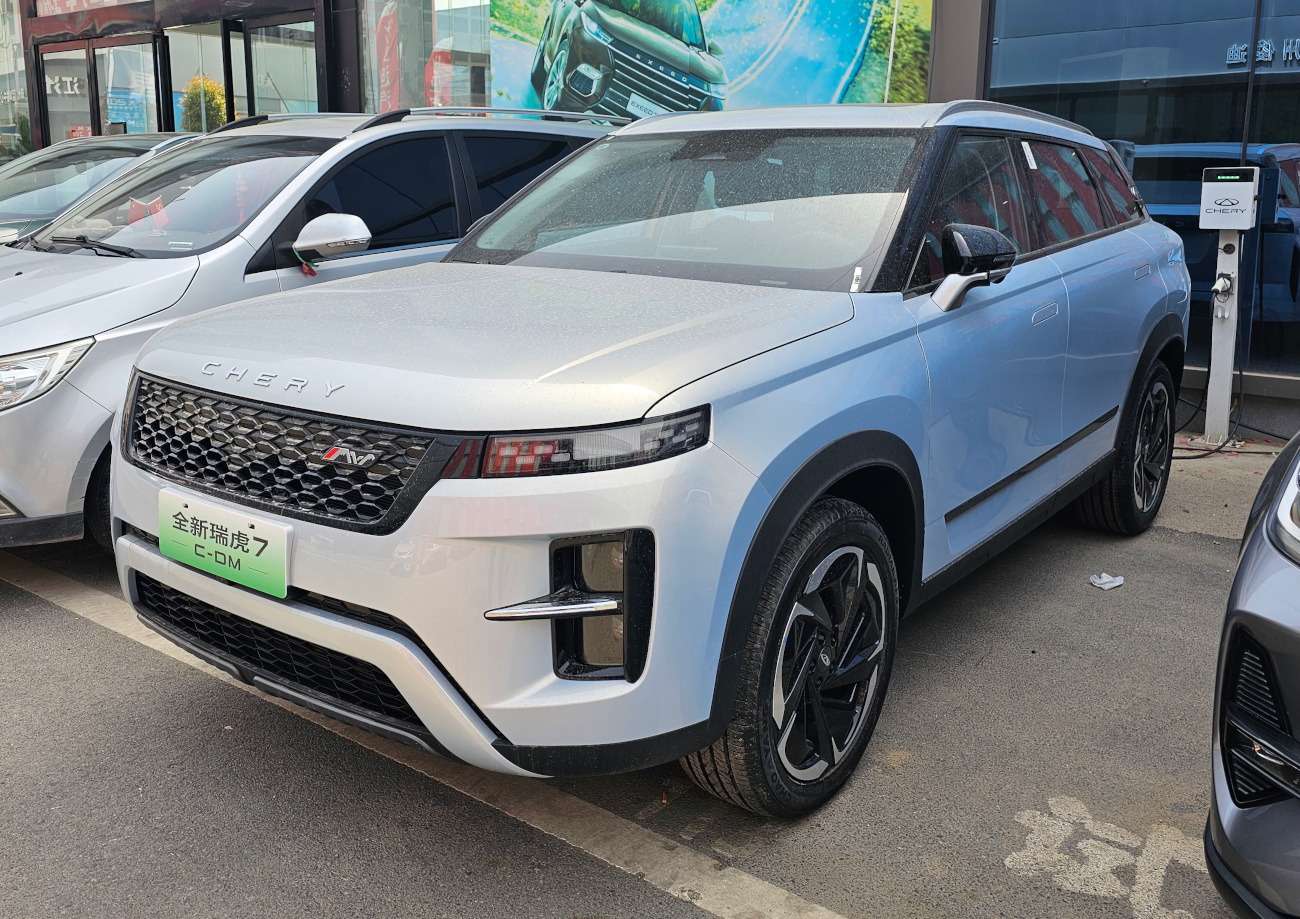
Chery Tiggo 7 High Energy

Chery Tiggo 7 CSH

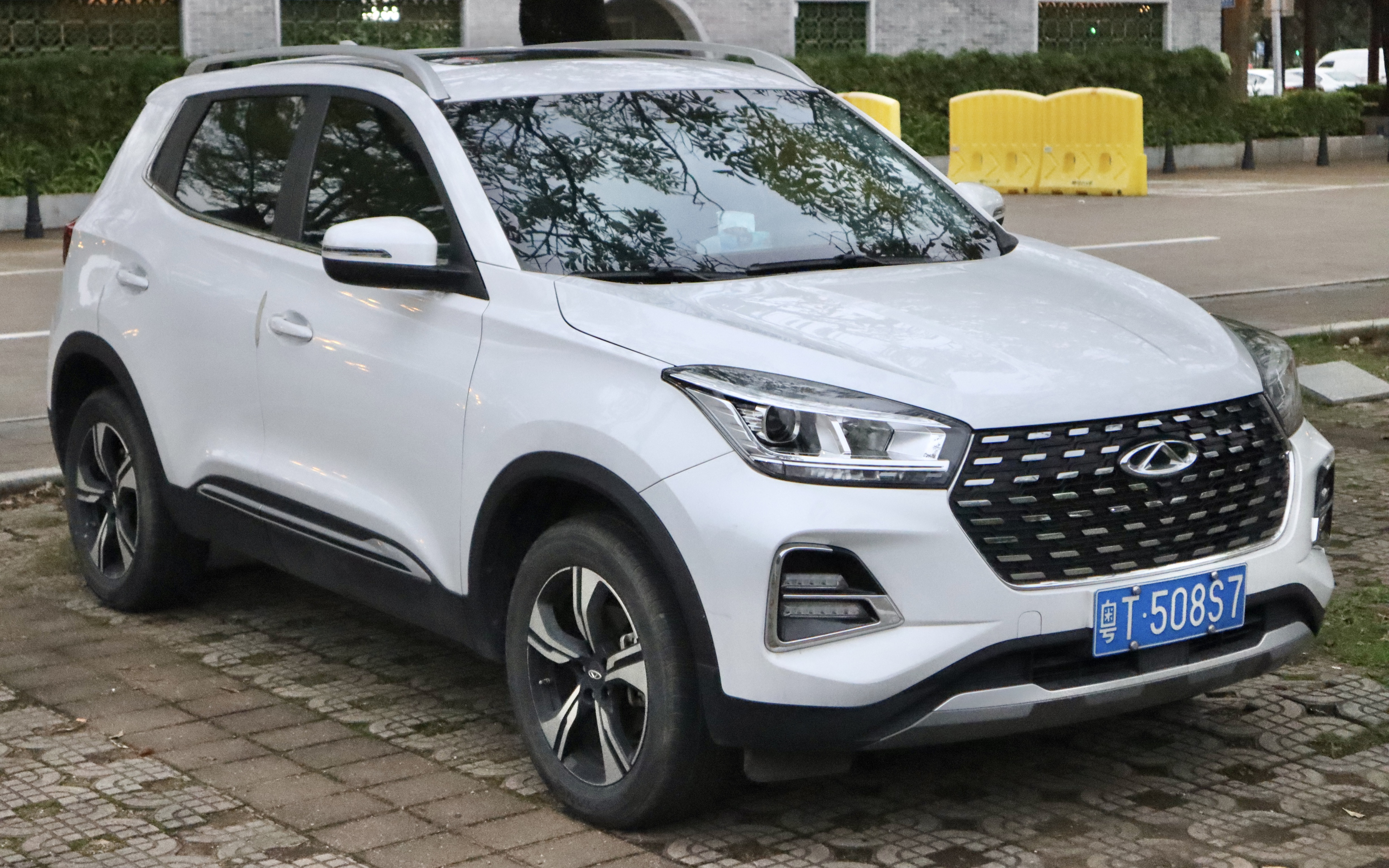
Chery Tiggo 5x

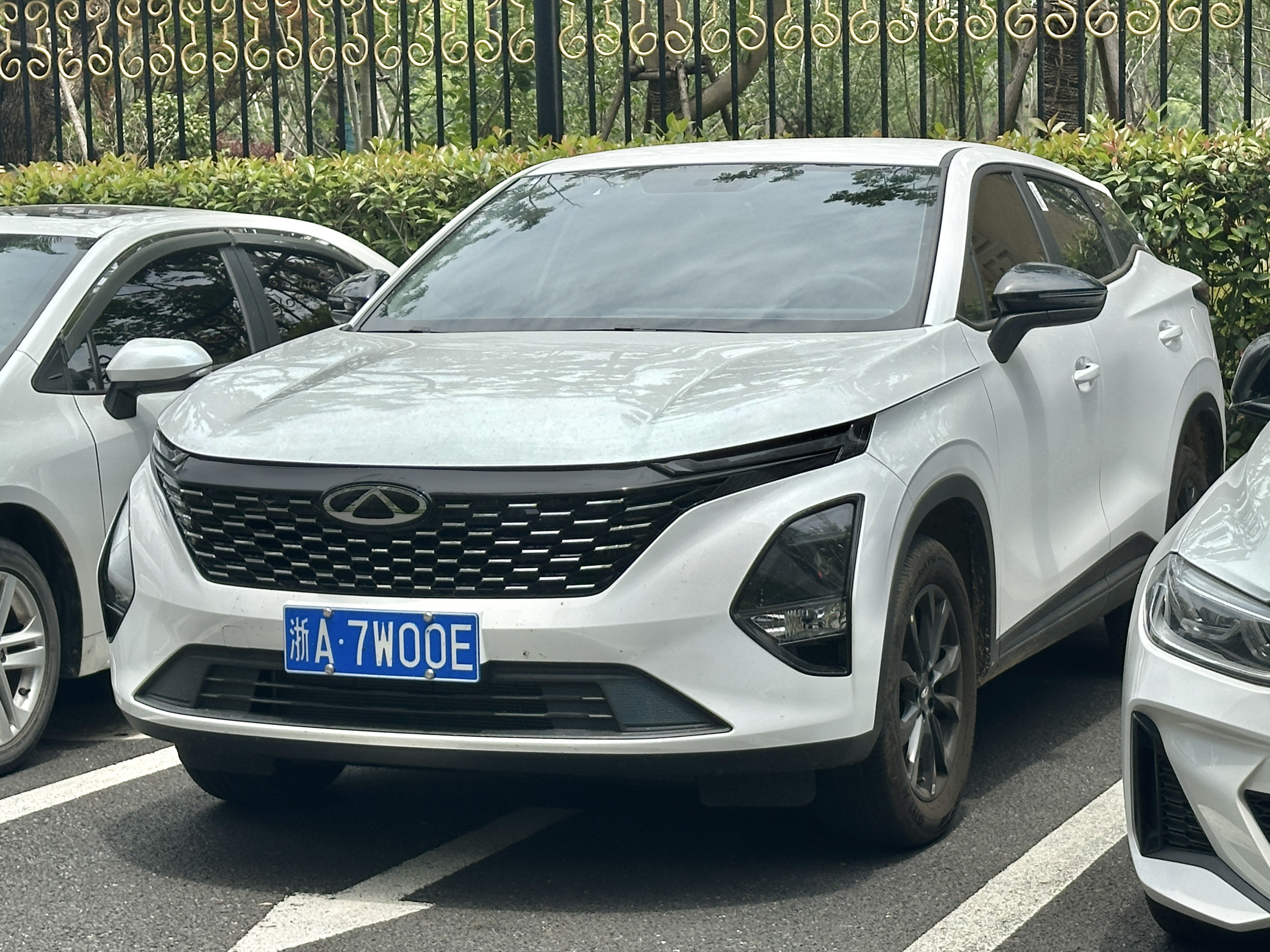
Chery Tiggo 5x High Energy

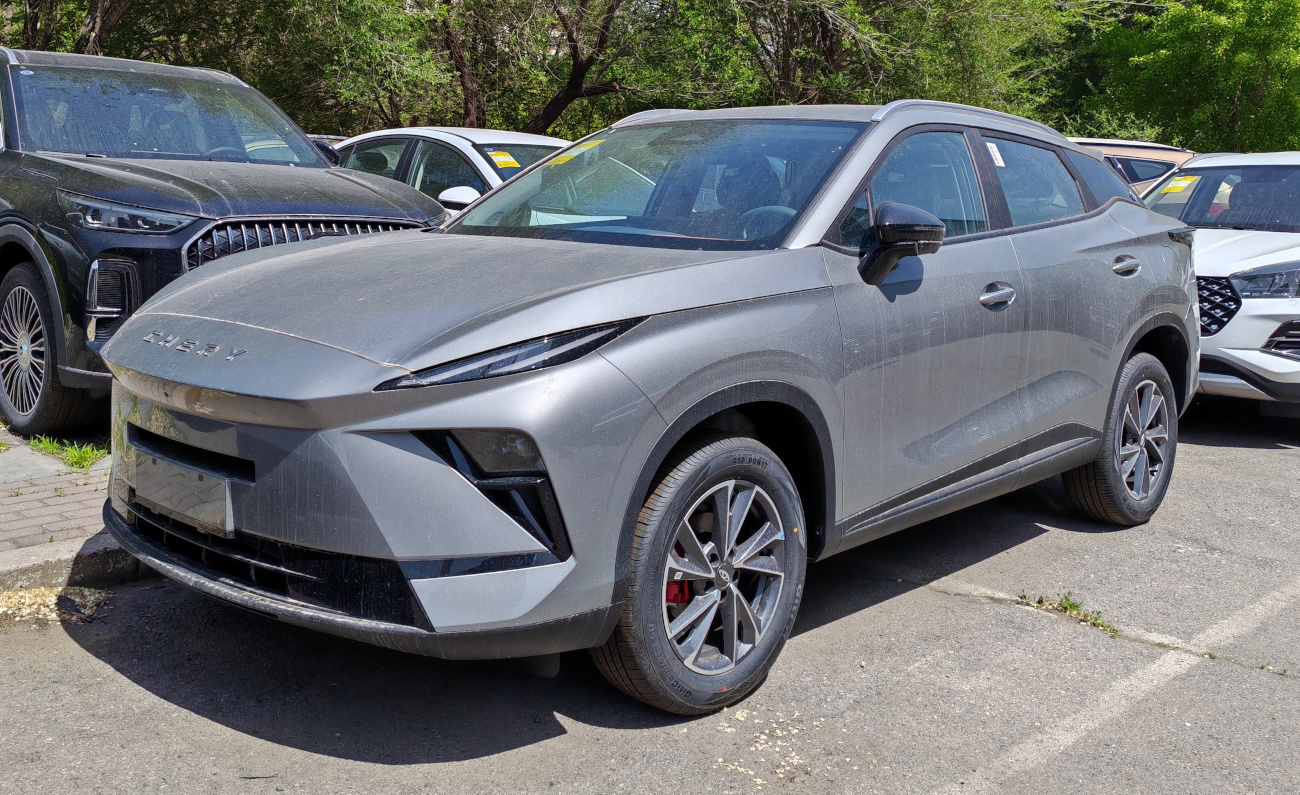
Chery Tiggo 5 Sport

Chery Tiggo 4 CSH

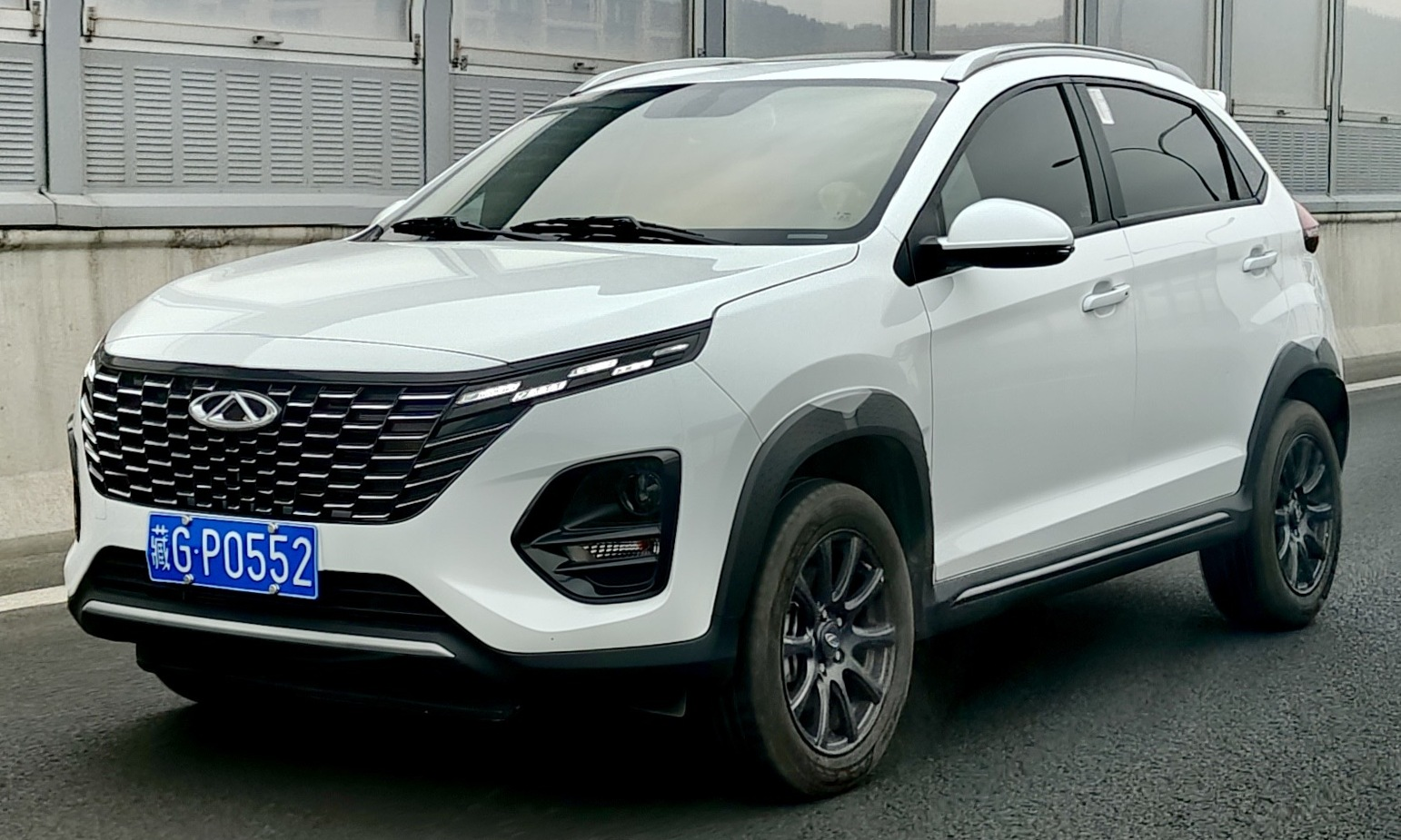
Chery Tiggo 3x

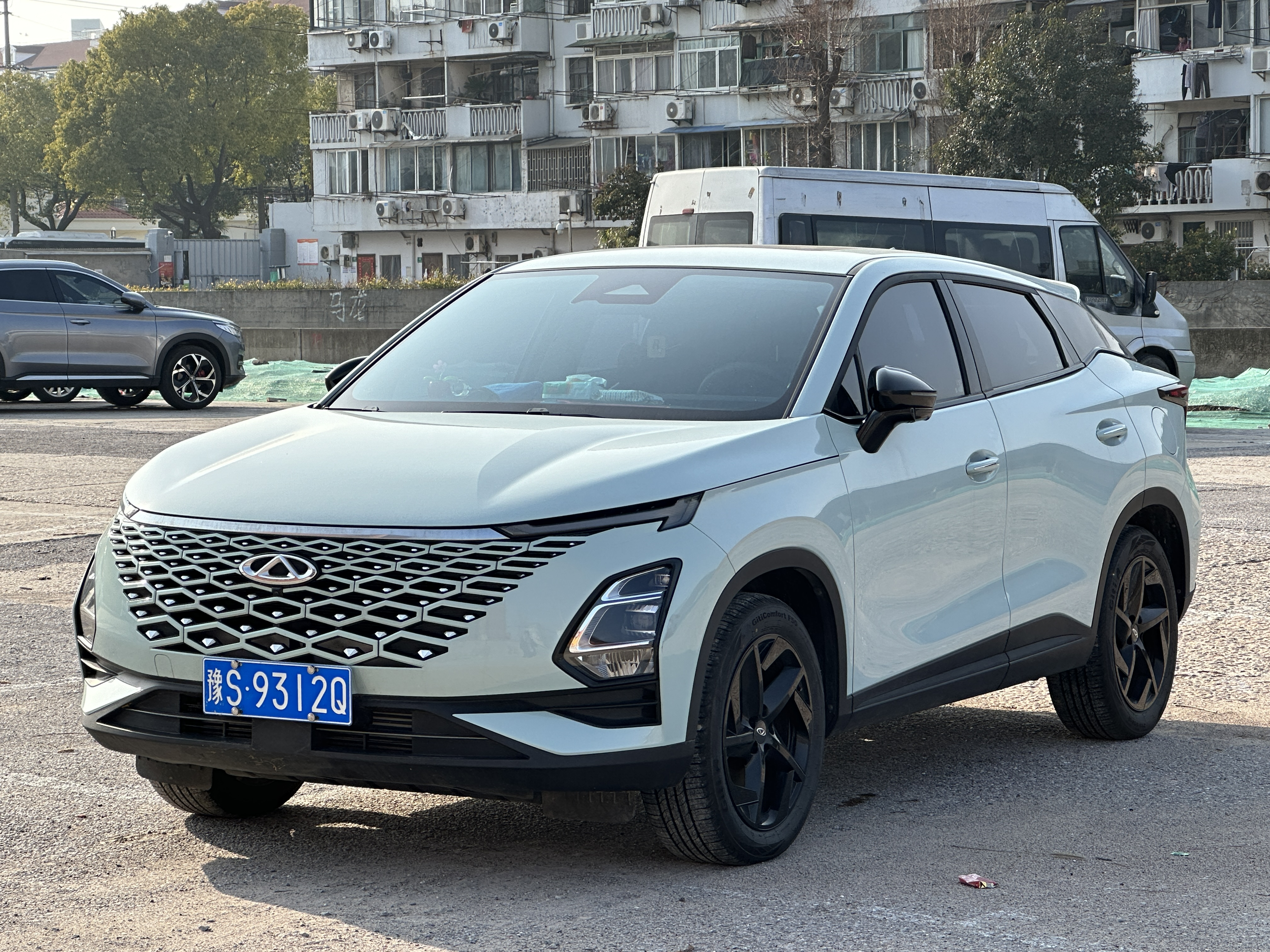
Chery Omoda 5

==== Pick-up ====
- Chery Himla (2025–present), export-only mid-size pick-up
- Chery Stockman (model code KP31; Q4 2026), mid-size pickup truck. First diesel plug-in hybrid pickup truck. Sold in South Africa as the Grootman.
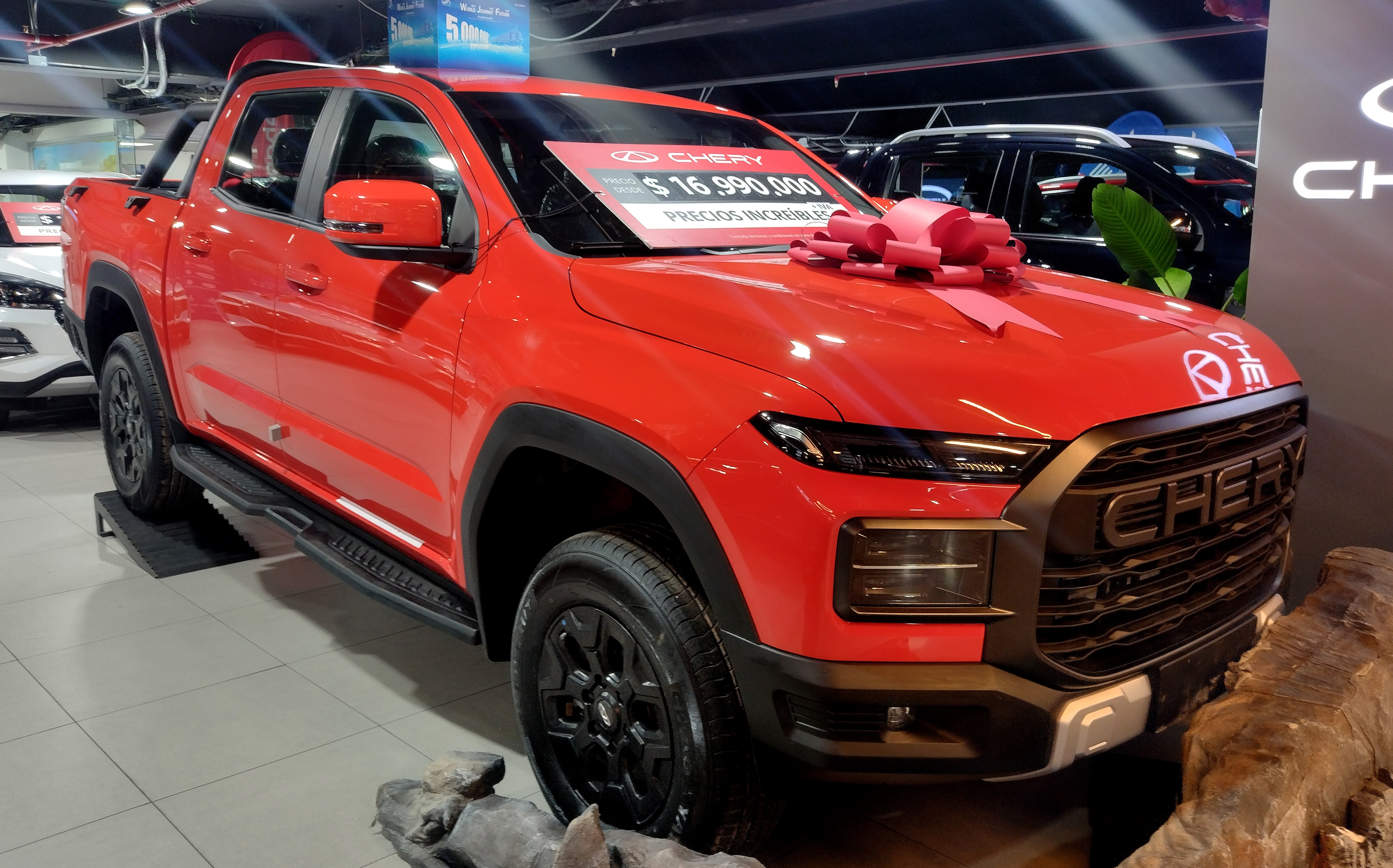
Chery Himla

Chery Stockman

=== Chery Fulwin ===
Logo of Chery Fulwin

Chery Fulwin (Chinese: 风云; pinyin: Fēngyún) is a product line of Chery established in November 2023 to market plug-in hybrid vehicles. Most Fulwin vehicles are based on Chery petrol vehicles with an additional plug-in hybrid system marketed as Kunpeng Super Performance Electric Hybrid C-DM. Chery Fulwin vehicles are distributed through separate dealership network.

Chery Fulwin products will be divided into three series: A, T and M, representing sedan, SUV and MPV categories respectively. Extended-range electric and battery electric vehicles are also planned. Its first model, the Fulwin A8 sedan was available to pre-sale in December 2023.

The Fulwin/Fengyun name was a model name used by Chery several times in the past, starting from the Fengyun sedan in 1999.

Since 8 July 2025, Chery Fulwin was repositioned from a product series to an independent brand, positioning itself as a "global new energy luxury brand". After becoming independent, the new brand will belong to the newly established "Chery Brand Domestic Business Group" alongside Exeed, QQ, and Arrizo + Tiggo series.

==== Products ====
- Chery Fulwin A9L (2025–present), EREV full-size sedan
- Chery Fulwin A9 (2026–present), BEV mid-size sedan
- Chery Fulwin A8L (2024–present), PHEV variant of Arrizo 8
- Chery Fulwin T11 (2025–present), EREV full-size SUV
- Chery Fulwin T10 (2024–present), PHEV variant of Tiggo 9
- Chery Fulwin T9L (2026–present), PHEV mid-size SUV
- Chery Fulwin T9 (2024–present), PHEV variant of Tiggo 9X
- Chery Fulwin T8L (upcoming), PHEV variant of Tiggo 8 (2nd)
- Chery Fulwin T8 (2025–present), PHEV variant of Tiggo 8
- Chery Fulwin T7 (2026–present), BEV compact SUV
- Chery Fulwin T6 (2024–2025), PHEV variant of Tansuo 06
- Chery Fulwin X3L / X3 / X3 Plus (2025–present), compact SUV, previously known as iCar 03
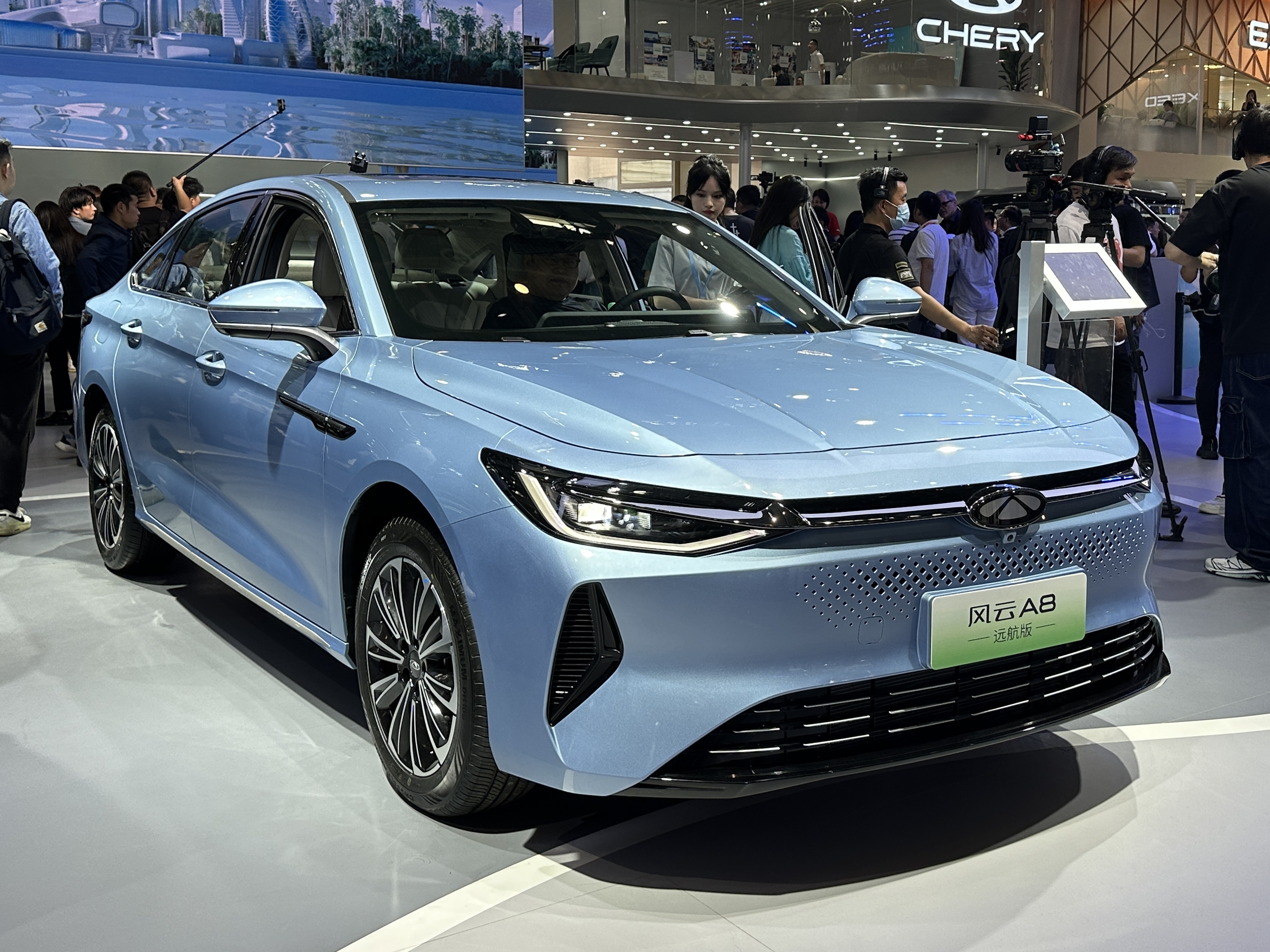
Chery Fulwin A8

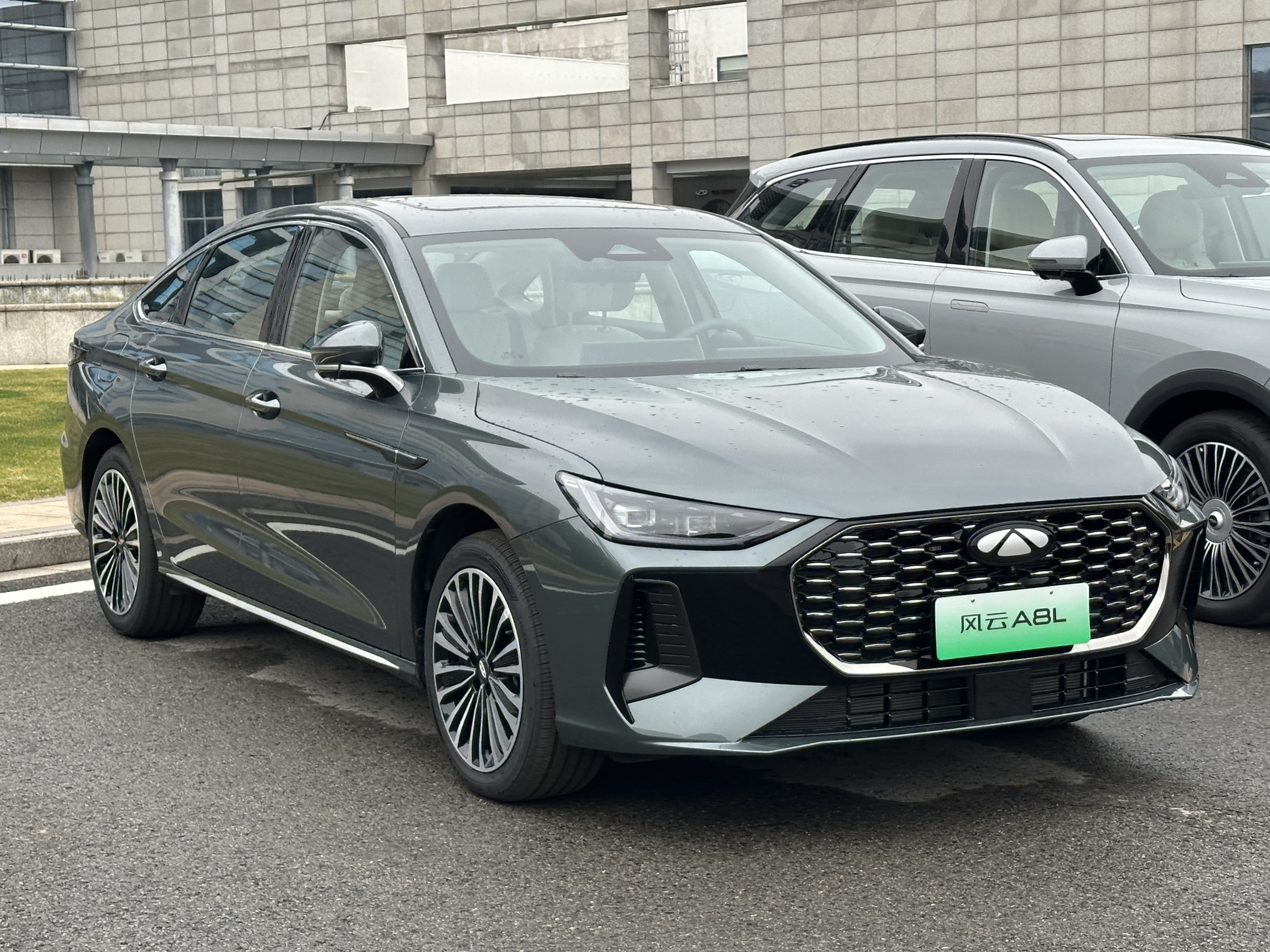
Chery Fulwin A8L

Chery Fulwin A9

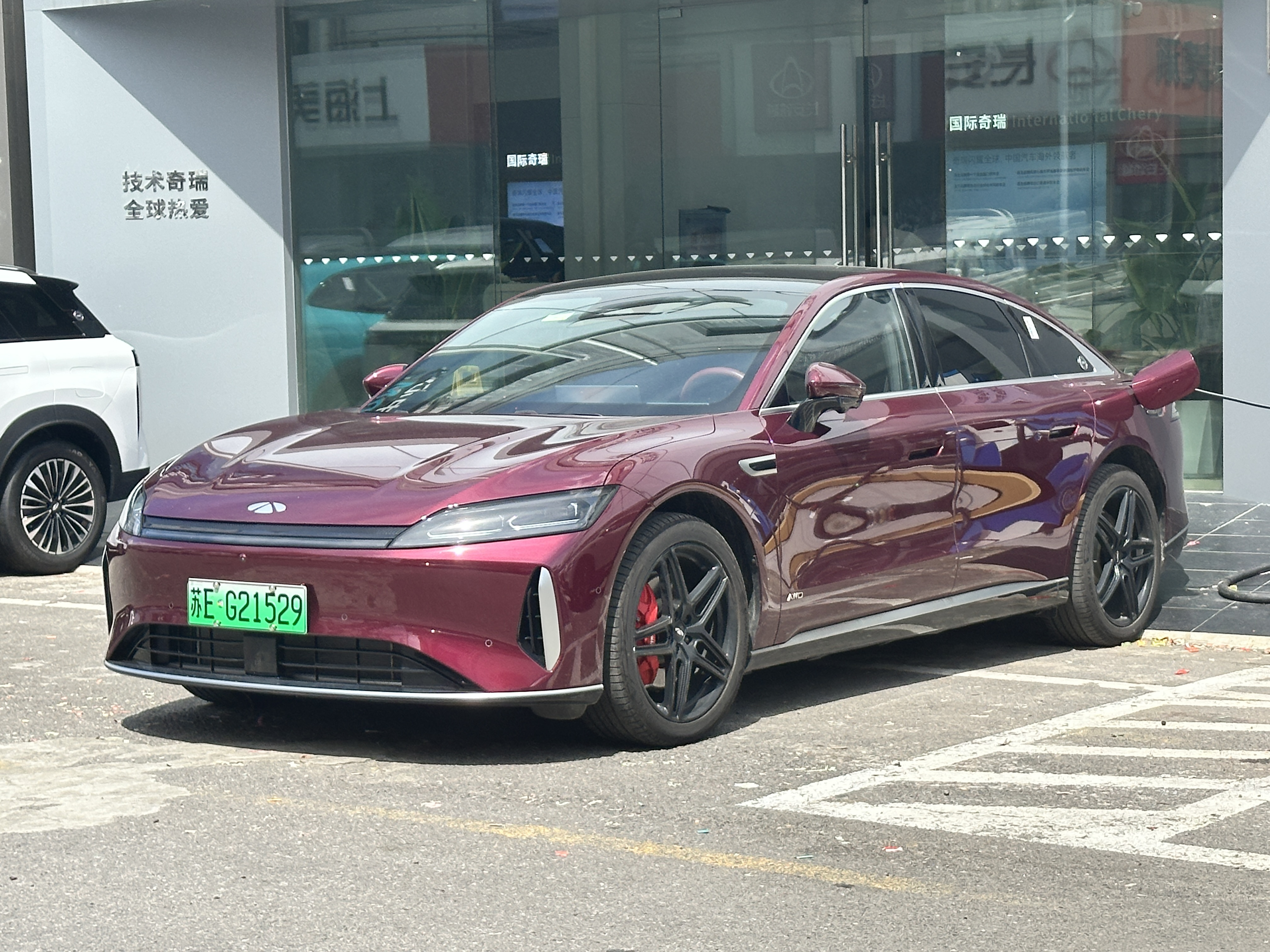
Chery Fulwin A9L

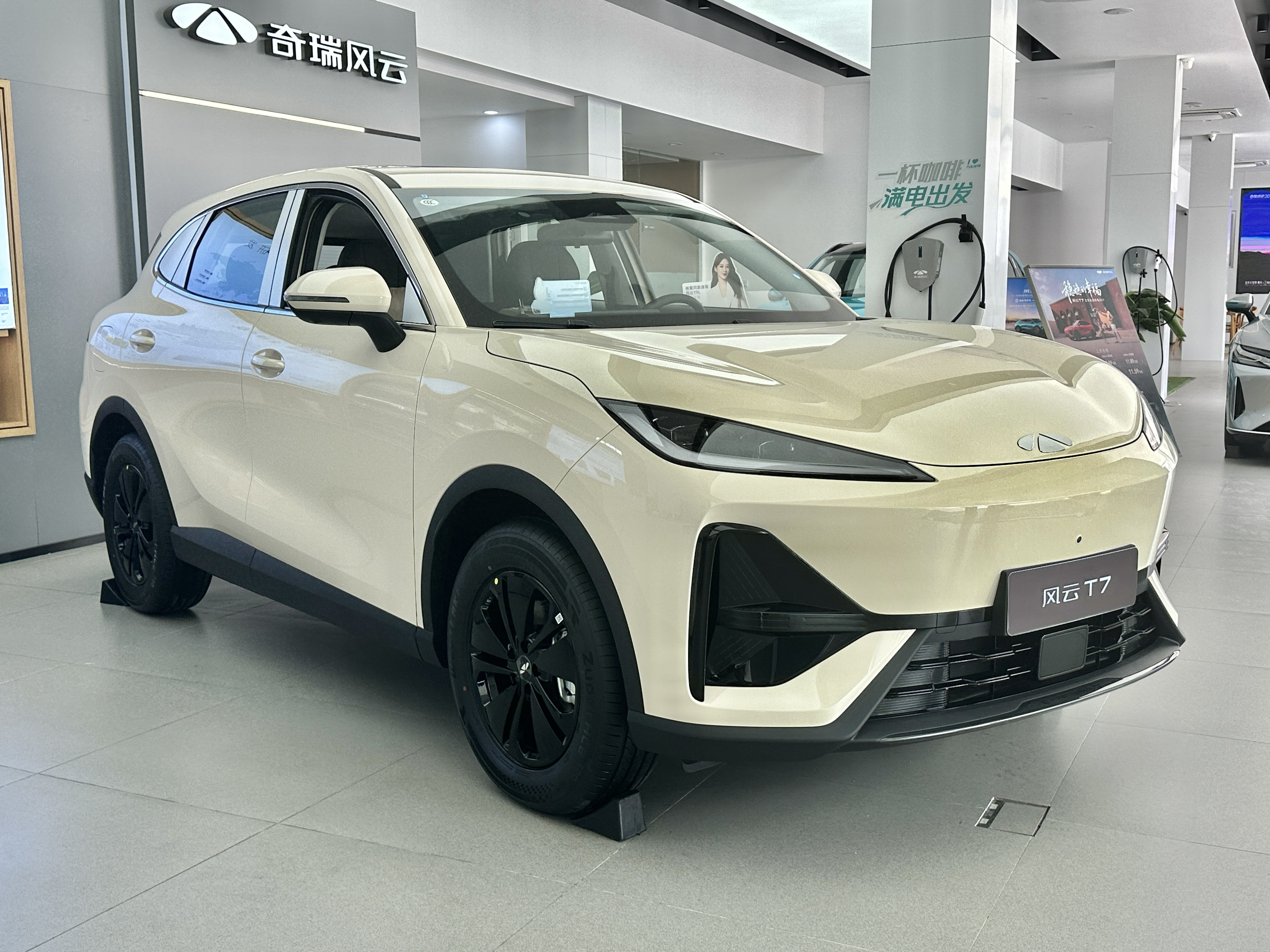
Chery Fulwin T7

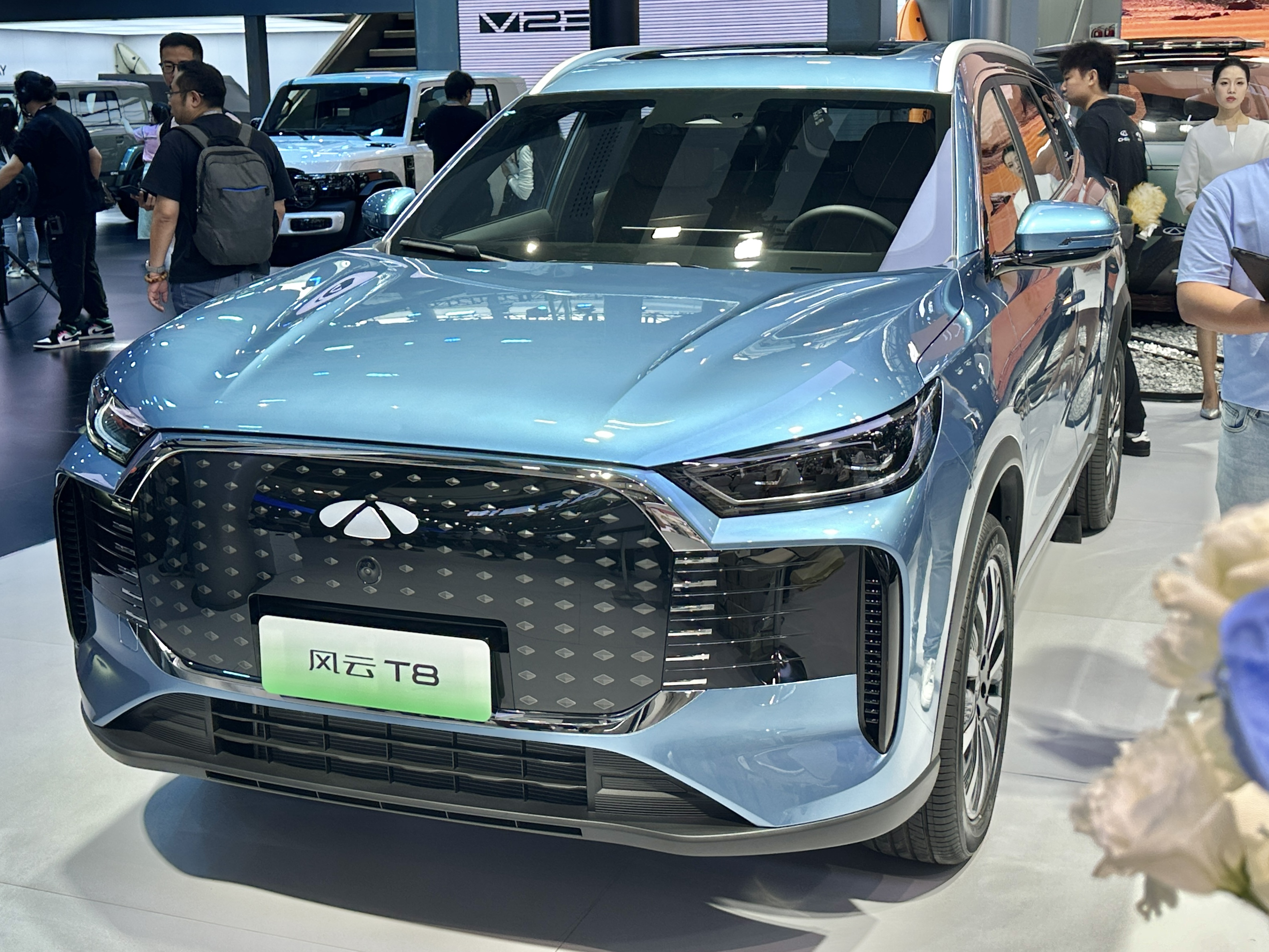
Chery Fulwin T8

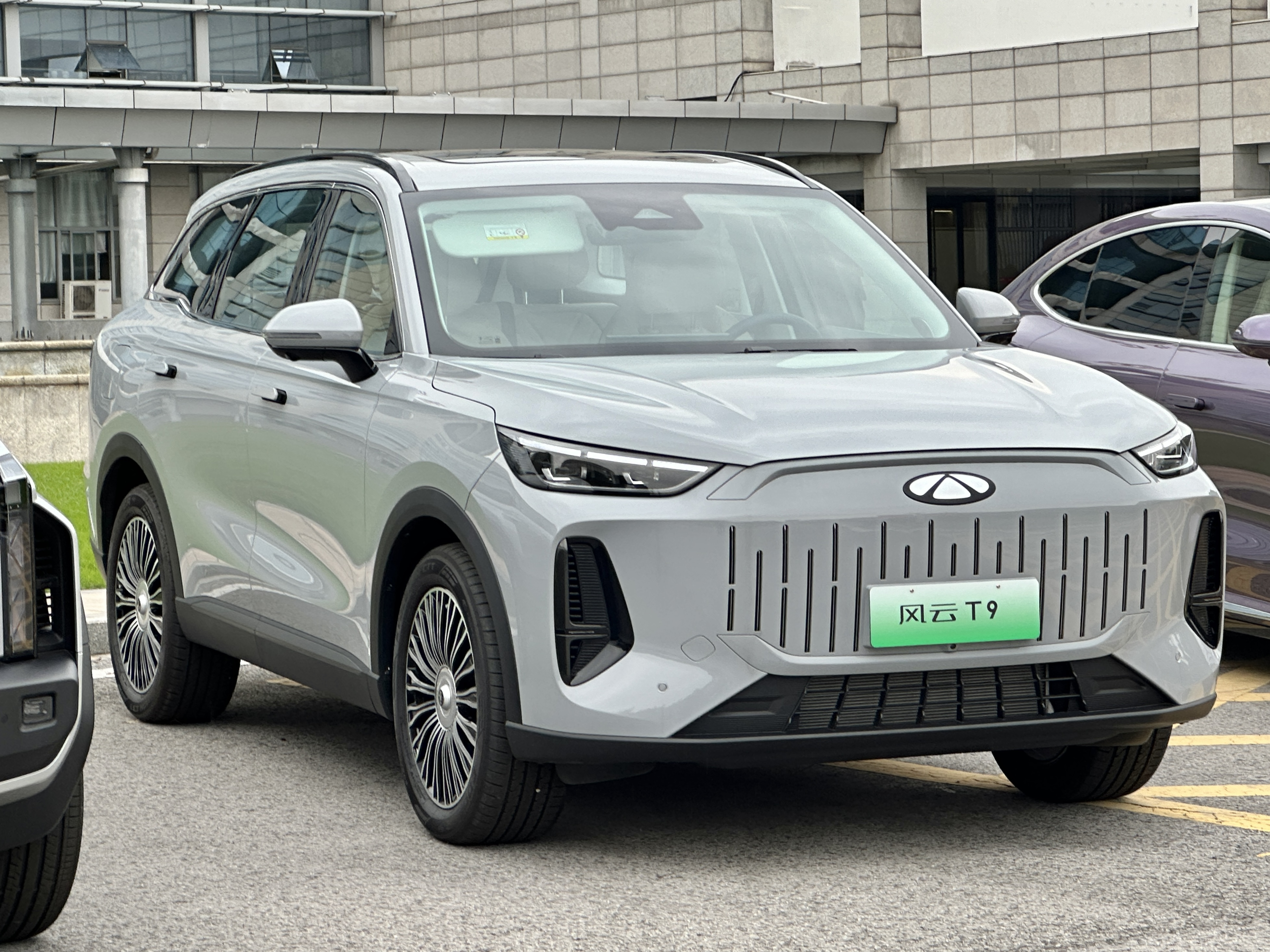
Chery Fulwin T9

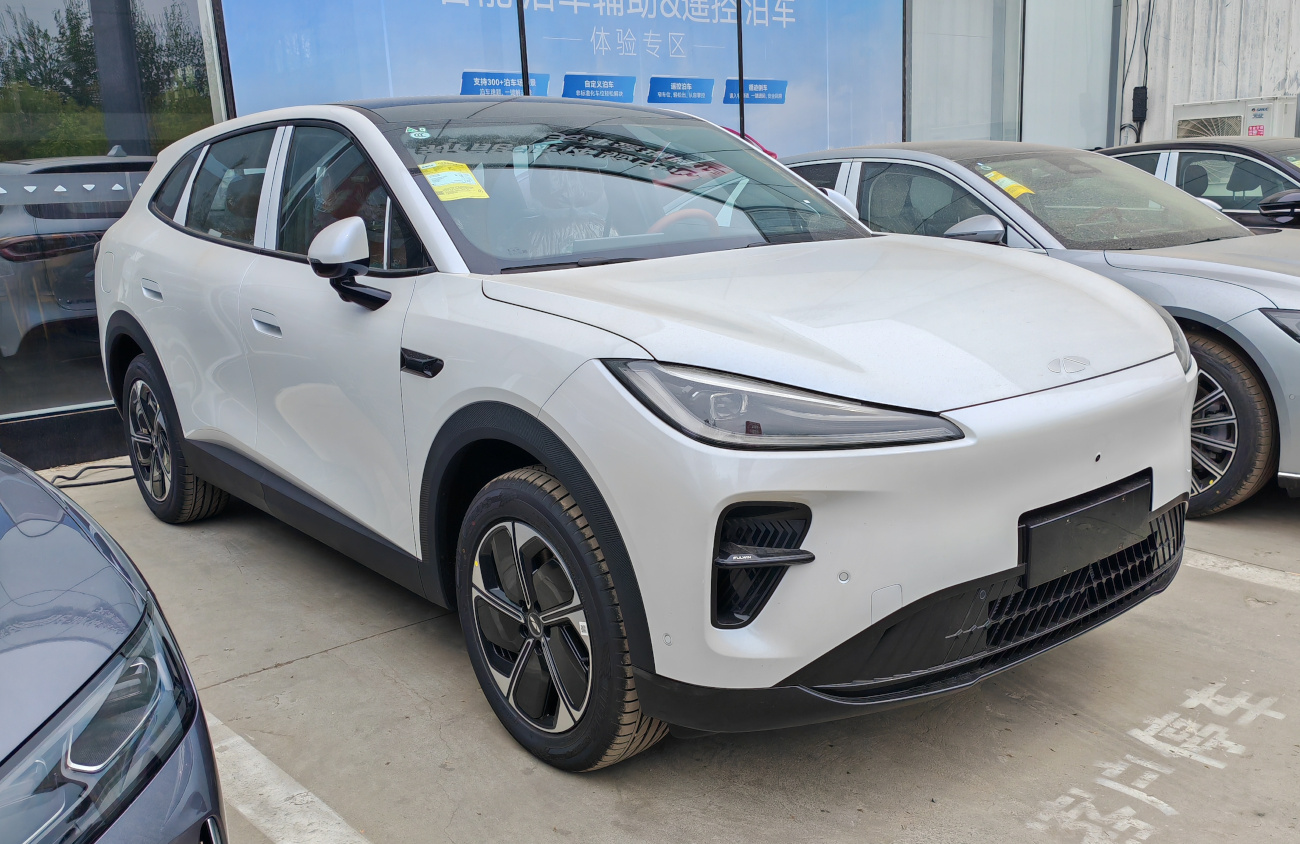
Chery Fulwin T9L

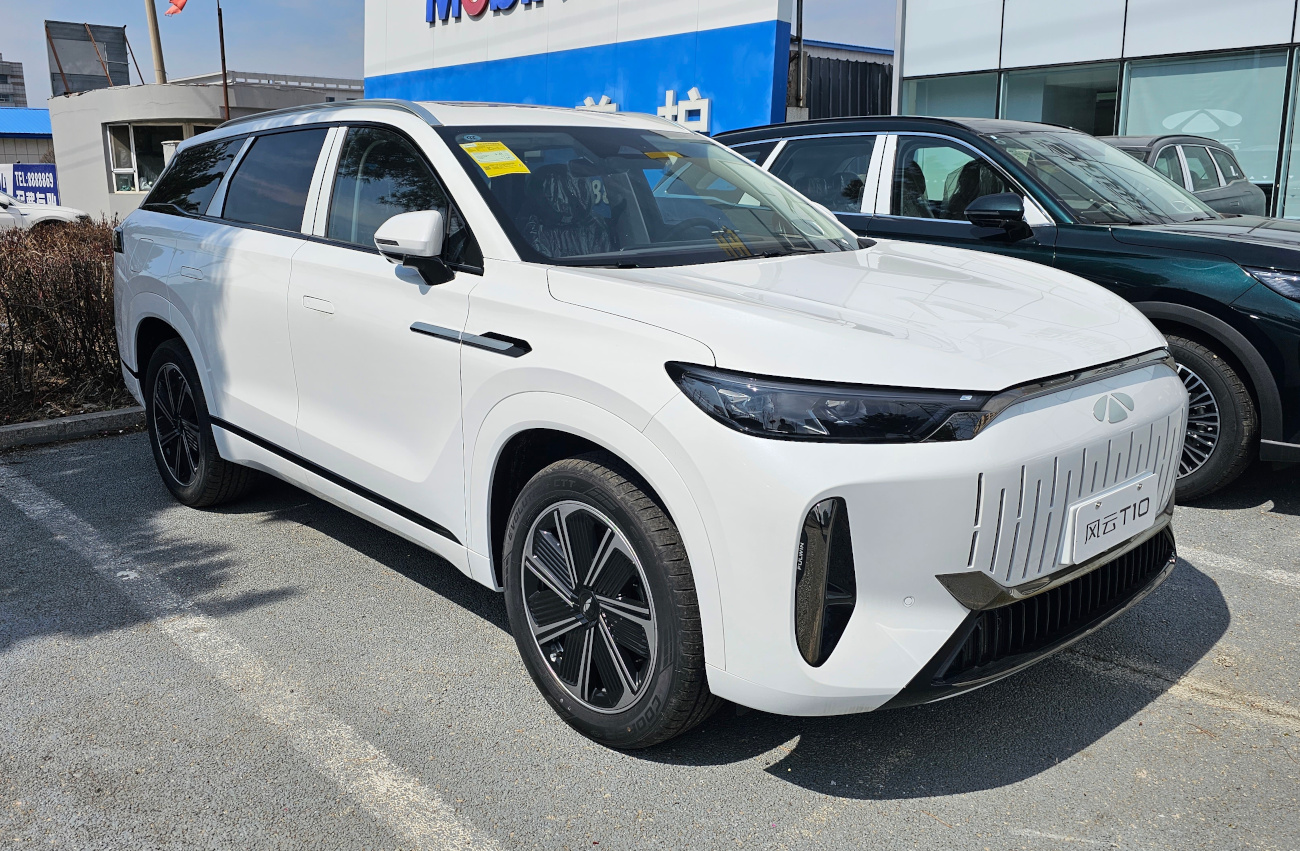
Chery Fulwin T10

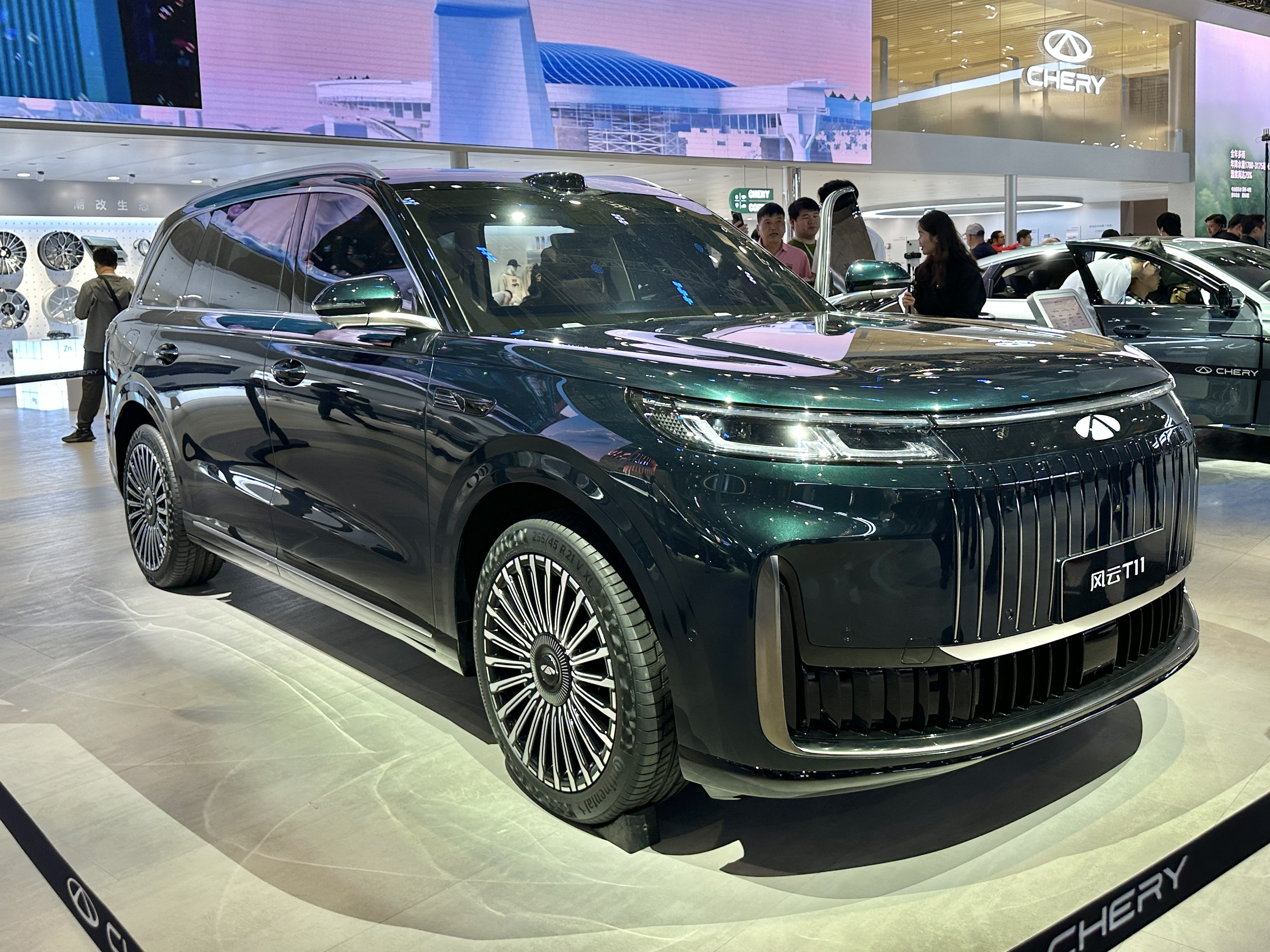
Chery Fulwin T11

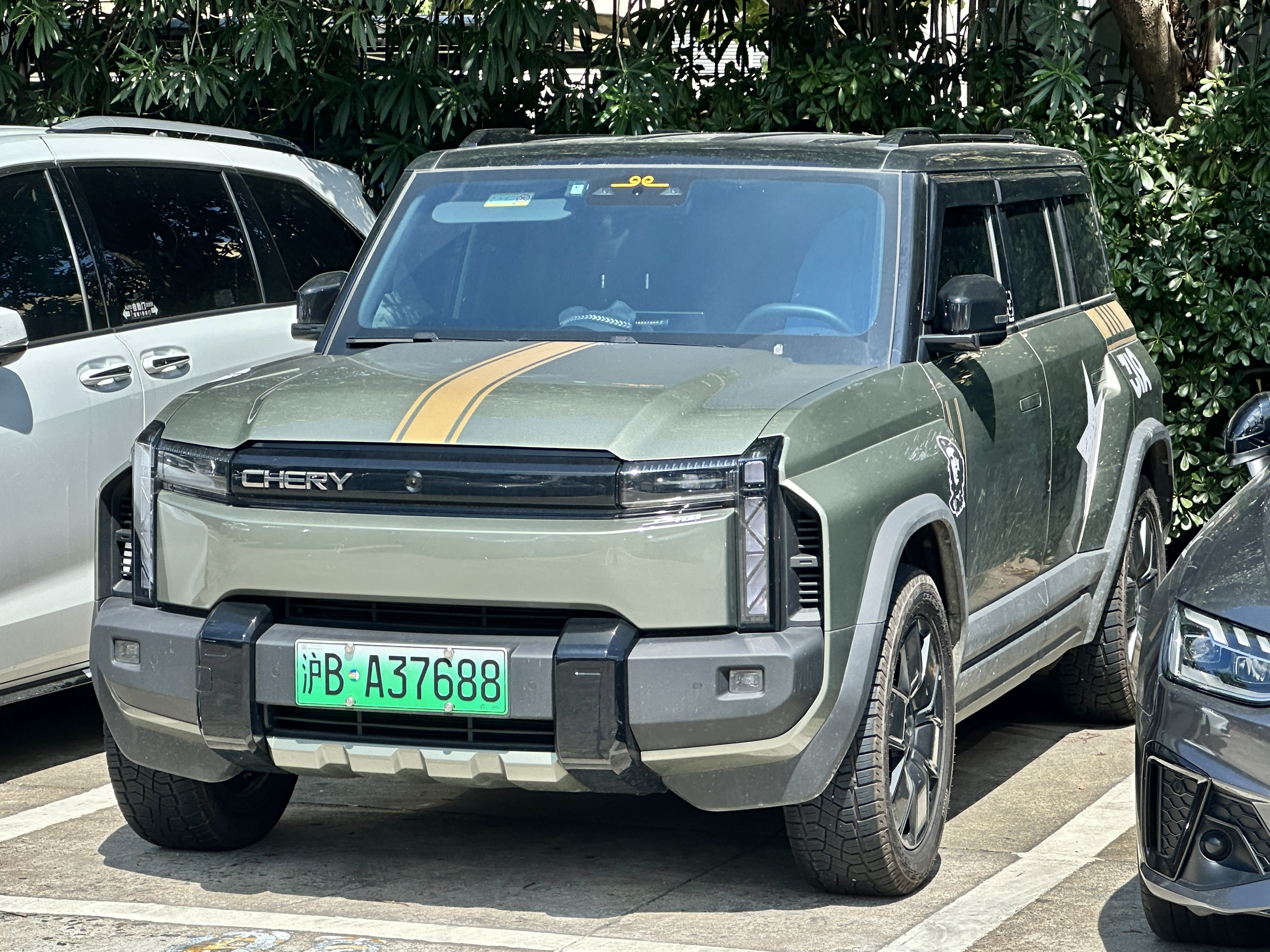
Chery Fulwin X3 Plus

=== Chery QQ ===
Logo of Chery QQ

Since 8 July 2025, Chery QQ was repositioned from an independent brand. After becoming independent, the new brand will belong to the newly established "Chery Brand Domestic Business Group" alongside Exeed, Fulwin, and Arrizo + Tiggo series.

==== Products ====
- Chery QQ3 (2026–present), subcompact hatchback
  - Chery Q (2026–present), battery electric hatchback, export version of the QQ3
- Chery QQ5 (upcoming), compact hatchback
- Chery Duomi (2025–present), city car
- Chery eQ1 (2017–present), city car
- Chery QQ Ice Cream (2021–present), city car
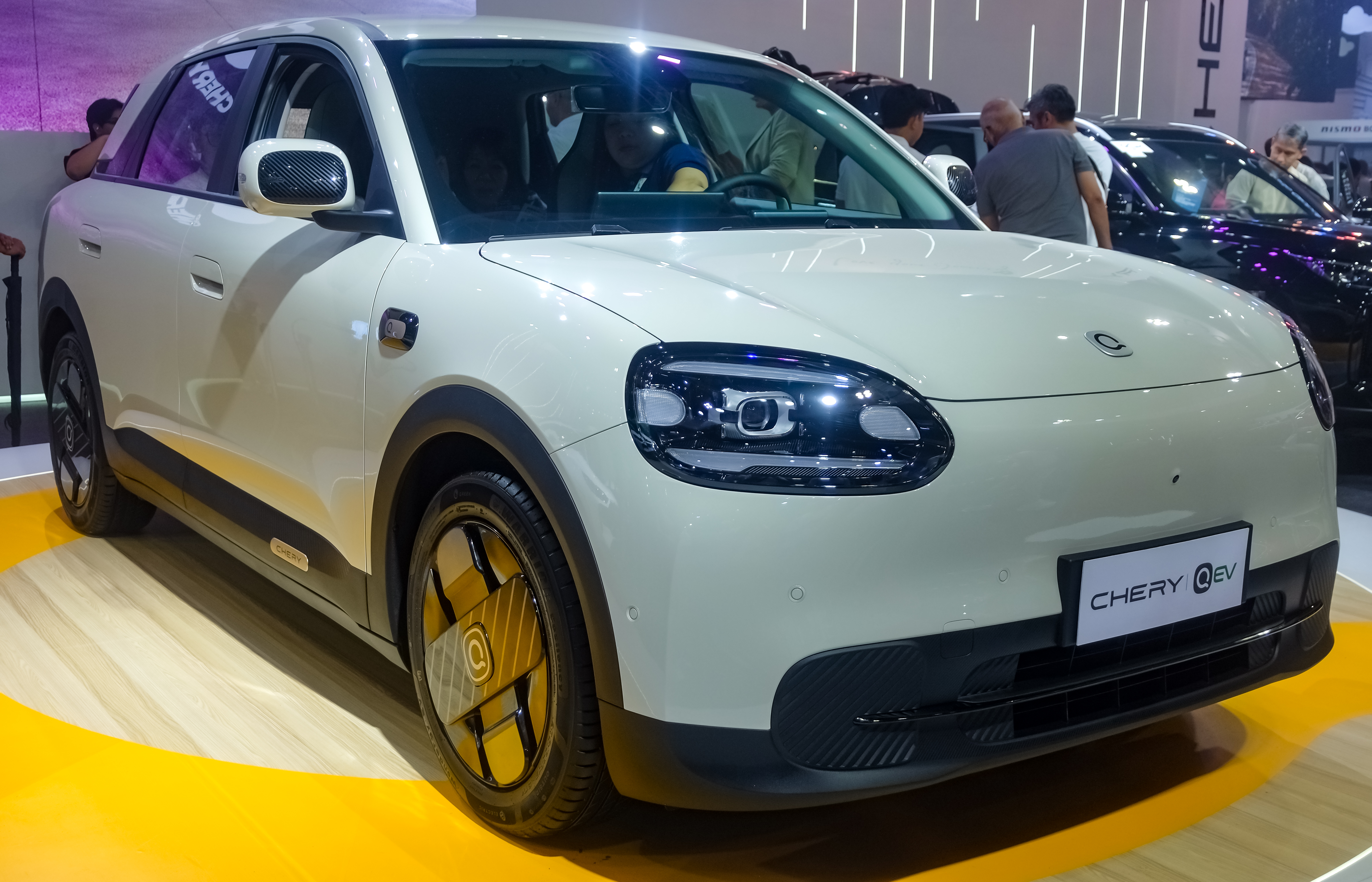
Chery QQ3

Chery Q

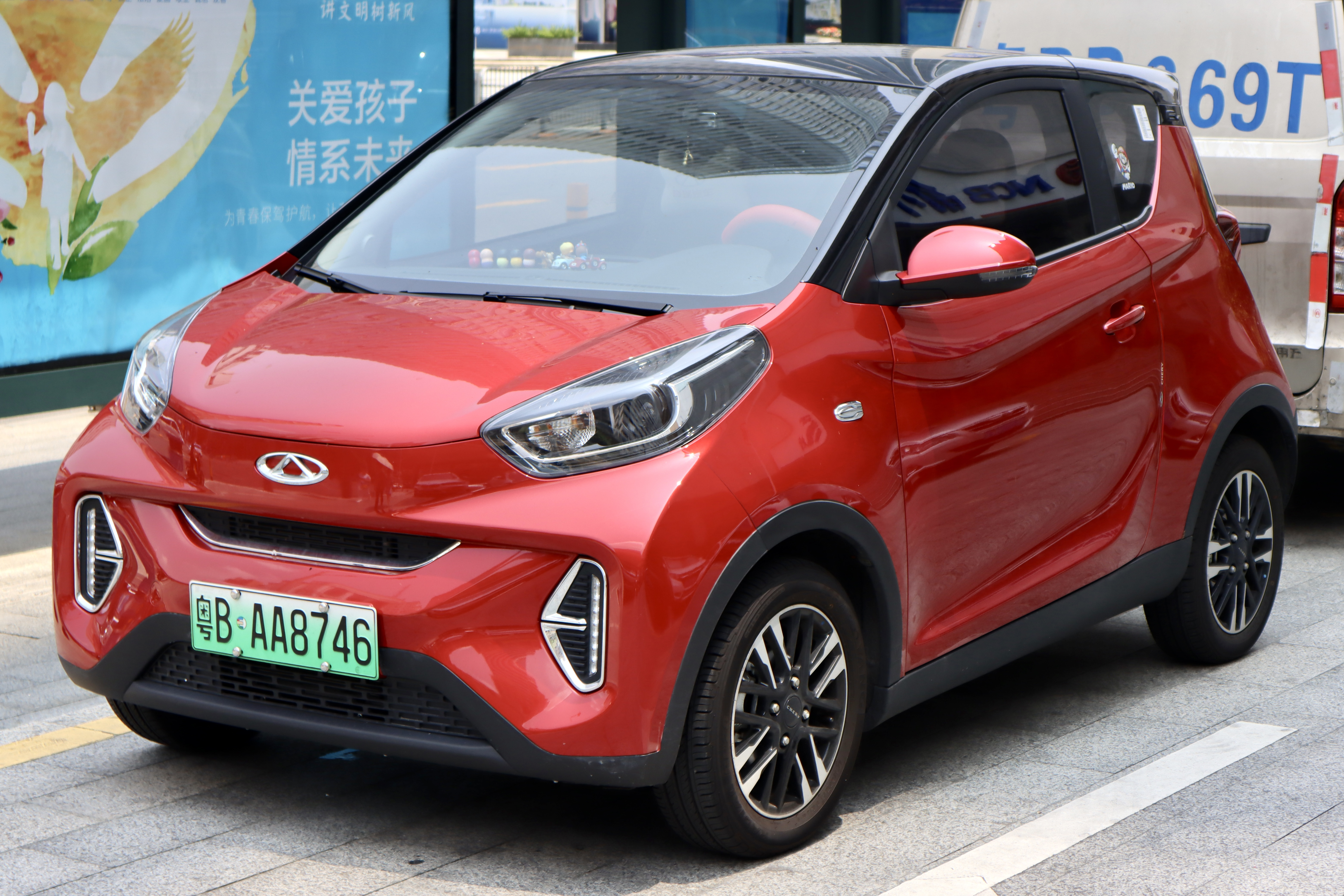
Chery eQ1

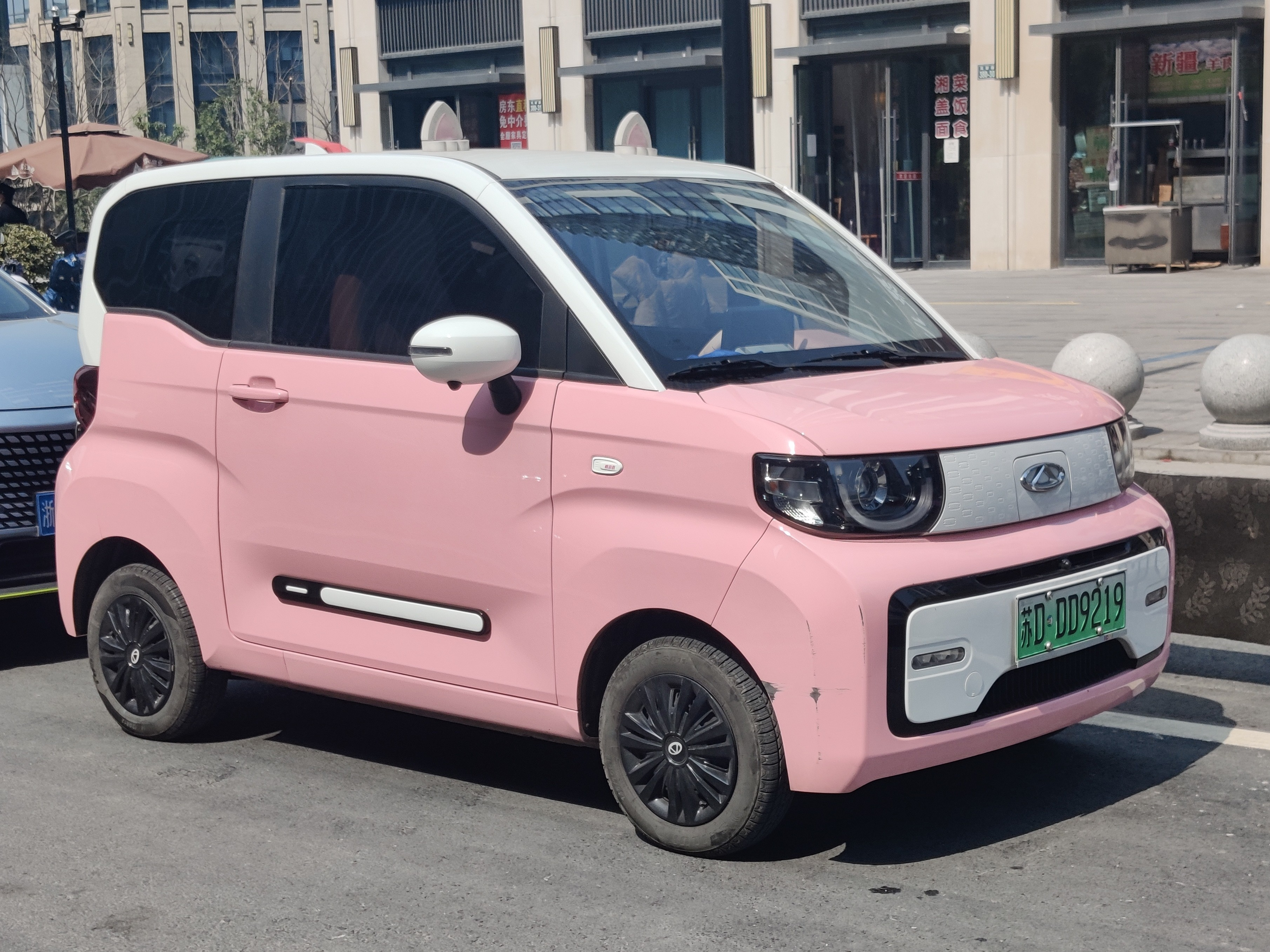
Chery QQ Ice Cream

=== Chery New Energy ===
Chery New Energy Vehicle Technology Co., Ltd.
- Type: Subsidiary
- Founded: April 2010; 16 years ago
- Area served: China
- Key people: Mandy Xia (Senior Sales Manager)
- Products: Automobiles
- Revenue: 480,000,000,000 renminbi (2024)
- Number of employees: 48,000 (2024)

Chinese name
- Simplified Chinese: 奇瑞新能源汽车技术有限公司
- Hanyu Pinyin: Qíruì Xīn Néngyuán Qìchē Jìshù Yǒuxiàn Gōngsī

Chery New Energy (Chinese: 奇瑞新能源; pinyin: Qíruì Xīn Néngyuán) is a subsidiary of Chery established in April 2010 to produce and market electric vehicles.

==== History ====
In April 2010, the Chinese company Chery decided to enter the then market the electric car industry and established the Chery New Energy division focused on the production of electric vehicles. In September of the same year, the branch's first product was launched in the form of the Chery QQ3EV, an electric variant of the QQ3 model, which remained the division's sole product until the late 2010s. In 2014, the QQ3EV replaced the more modern eQ based on the next generation of the city hatchback, and only three years later the range was expanded with further products. First, it was the electric equivalent of the Tiggo 3x, the crossover Tiggo 3xe, and with it – also based on the existing sedan model Arrizo 5eThat same year, Chery New Energy introduced its first model developed from scratch without a combustion engine, the small hatchback eQ1.

In 2019, the latest product, an electric-only variant of the existing Chery model, was added in the form of the crossover Tiggo e. At the beginning of the third decade of the 21st century, Chery New Energy began expanding its portfolio with designs built from scratch with electric drive in mind, starting with a large crossover eQ5. In August 2021, the QQ Ice Cream microcar was introduced as a response to the popularity of the Wuling Hongguang Mini EV. In 2025, the subsidiary was incorporated into Chery and only selected urban products remained in production after that as an integral part of the parent company's portfolio.

==== Products ====
- Chery Arrizo e (2016–present), compact Sedan
- Chery eQ7 (2023–present), compact SUV
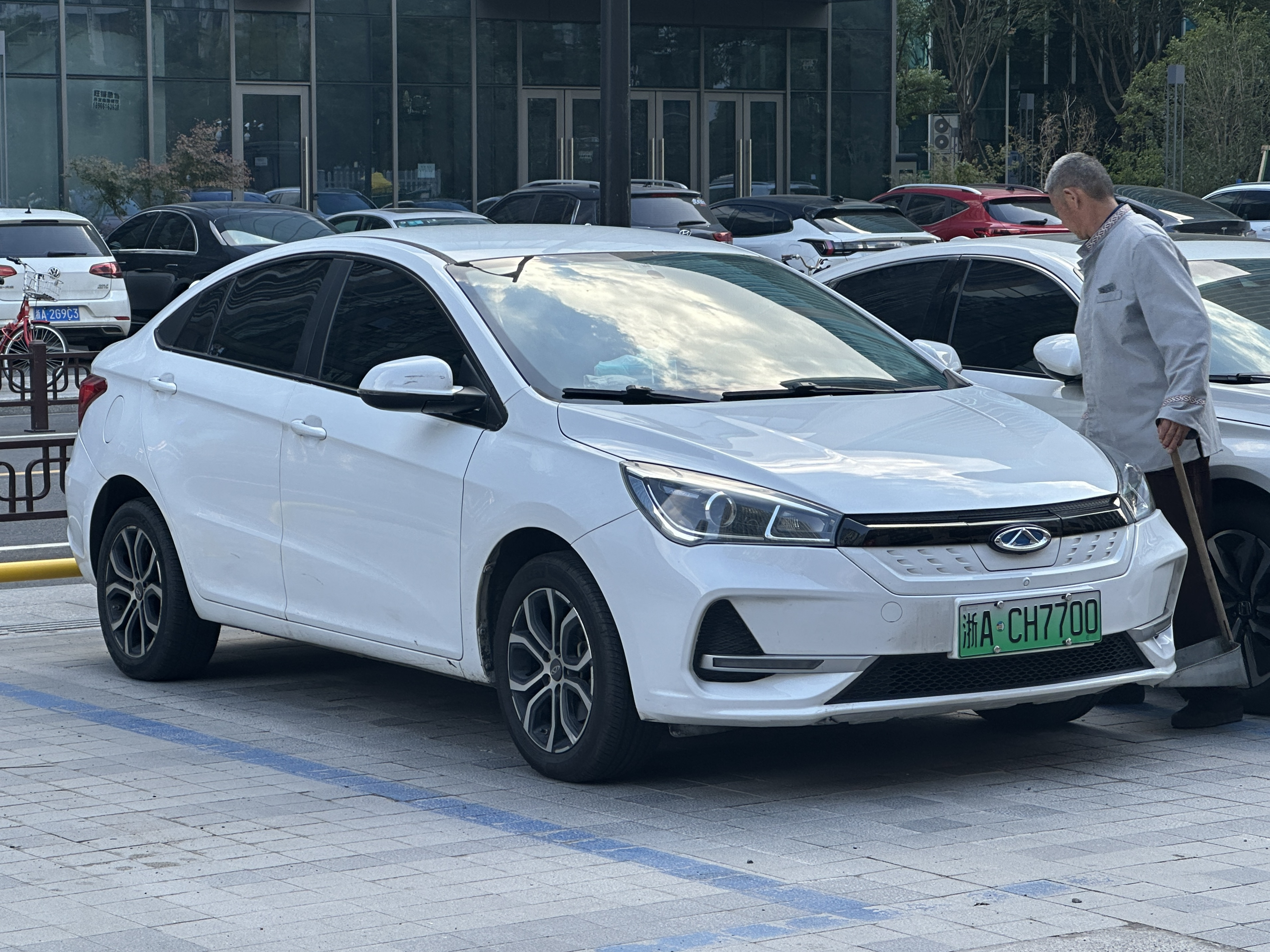
Chery Arrizo e

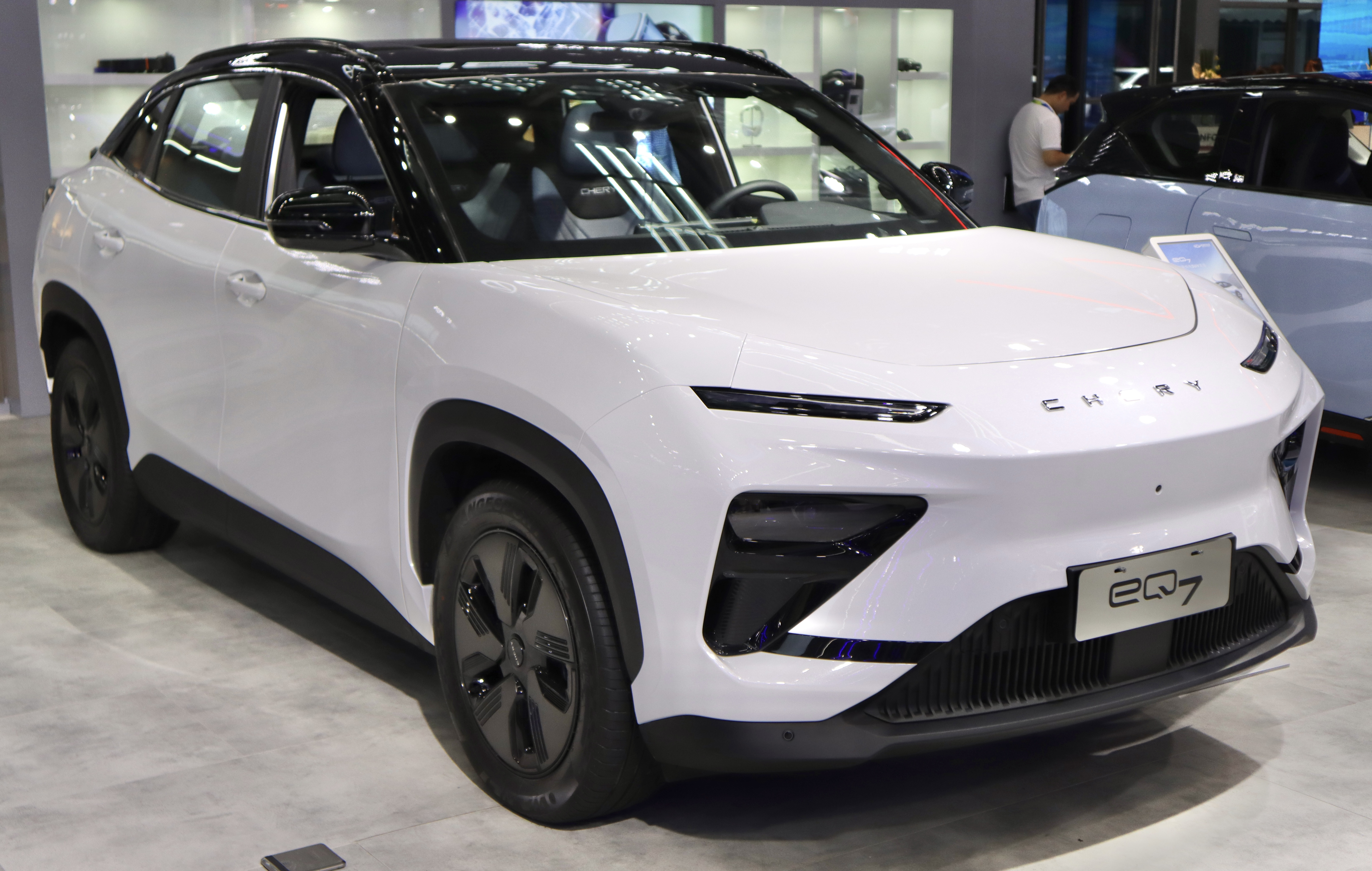
Chery eQ7

=== Exeed ===
Exeed (Chinese: 星途; pinyin: Xīngtú) is Chery's premium brand for passenger vehicles, which was established in 2017.

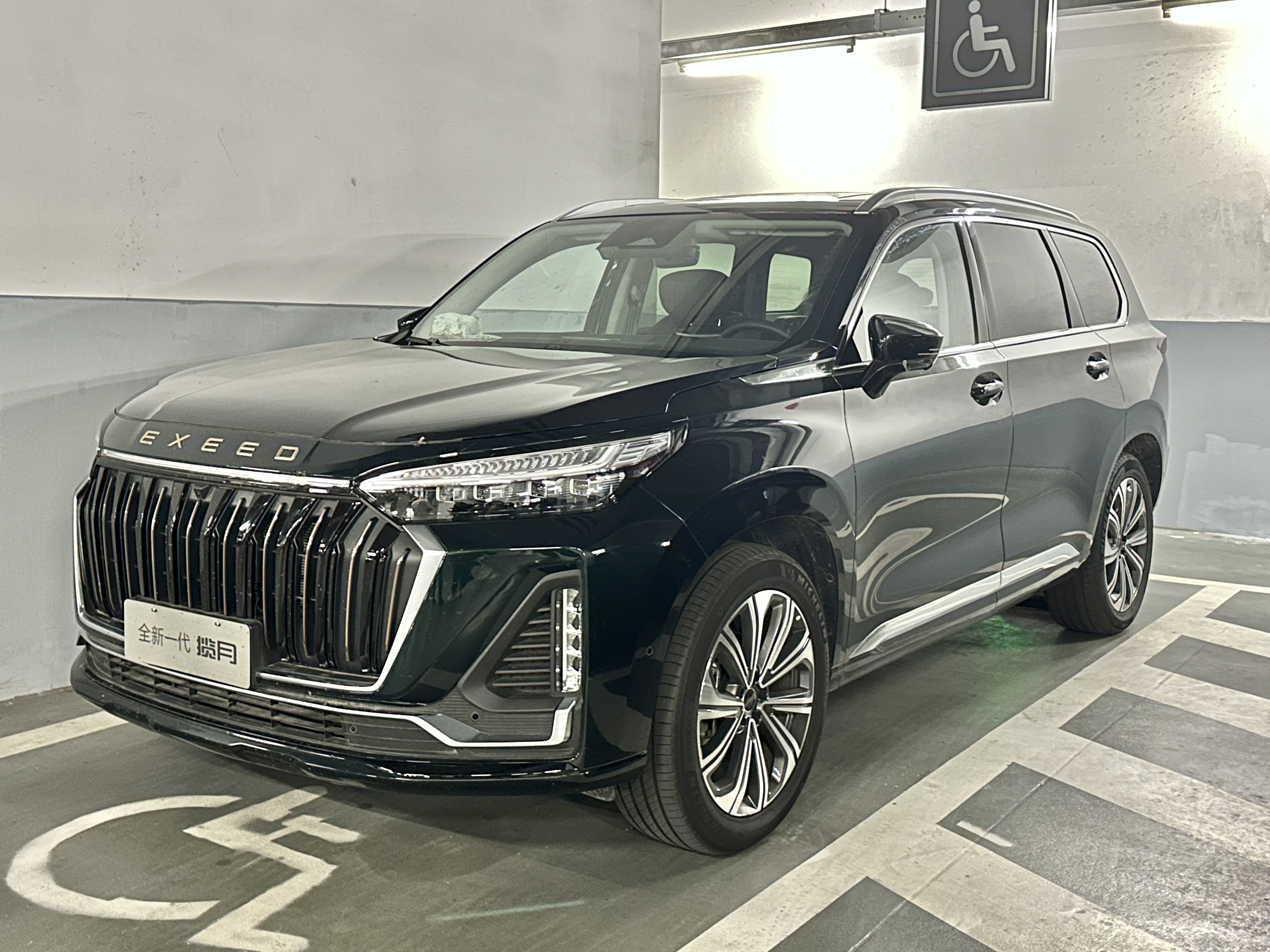
Exeed Lanyue

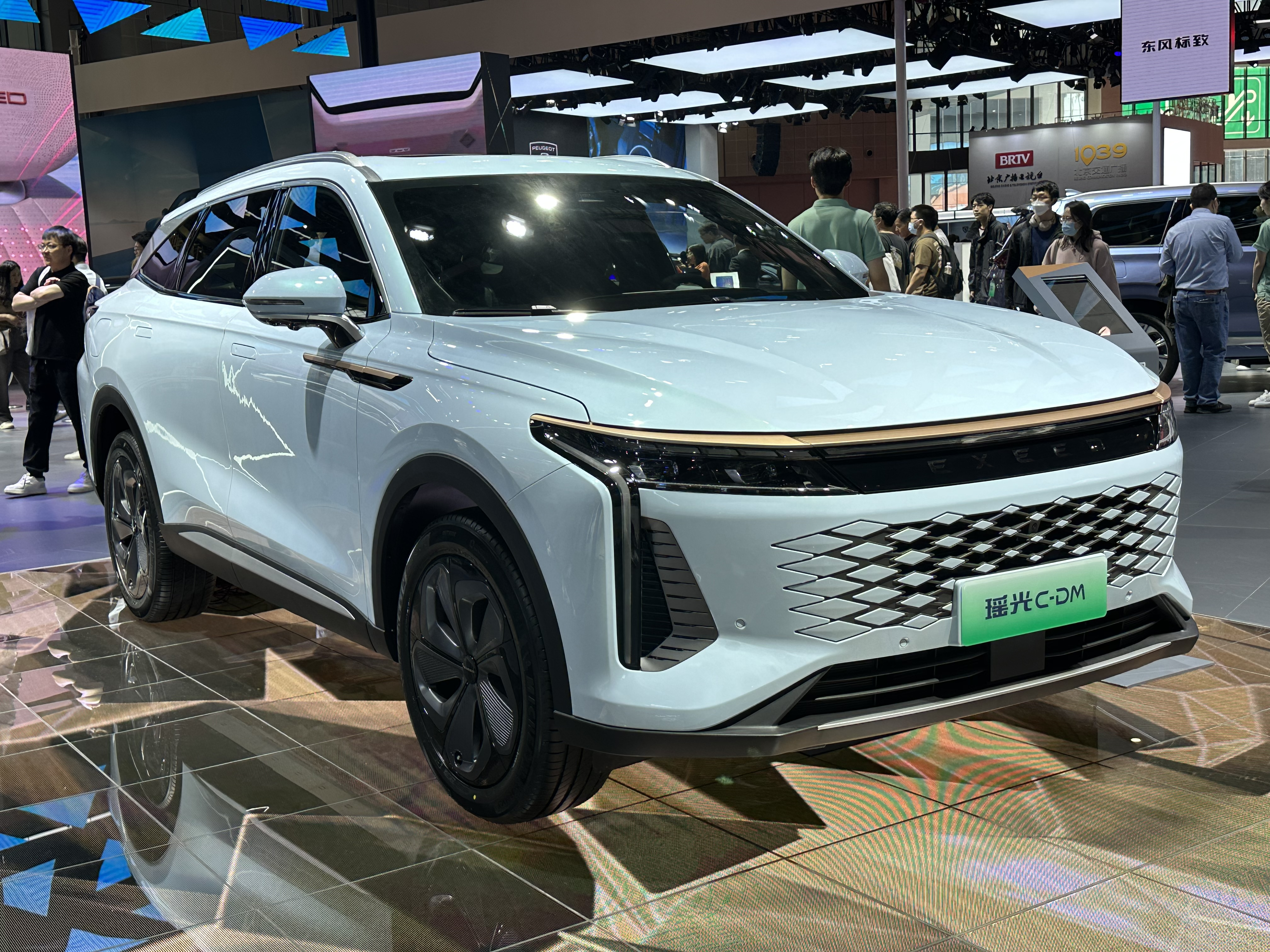
Exeed Yaoguang

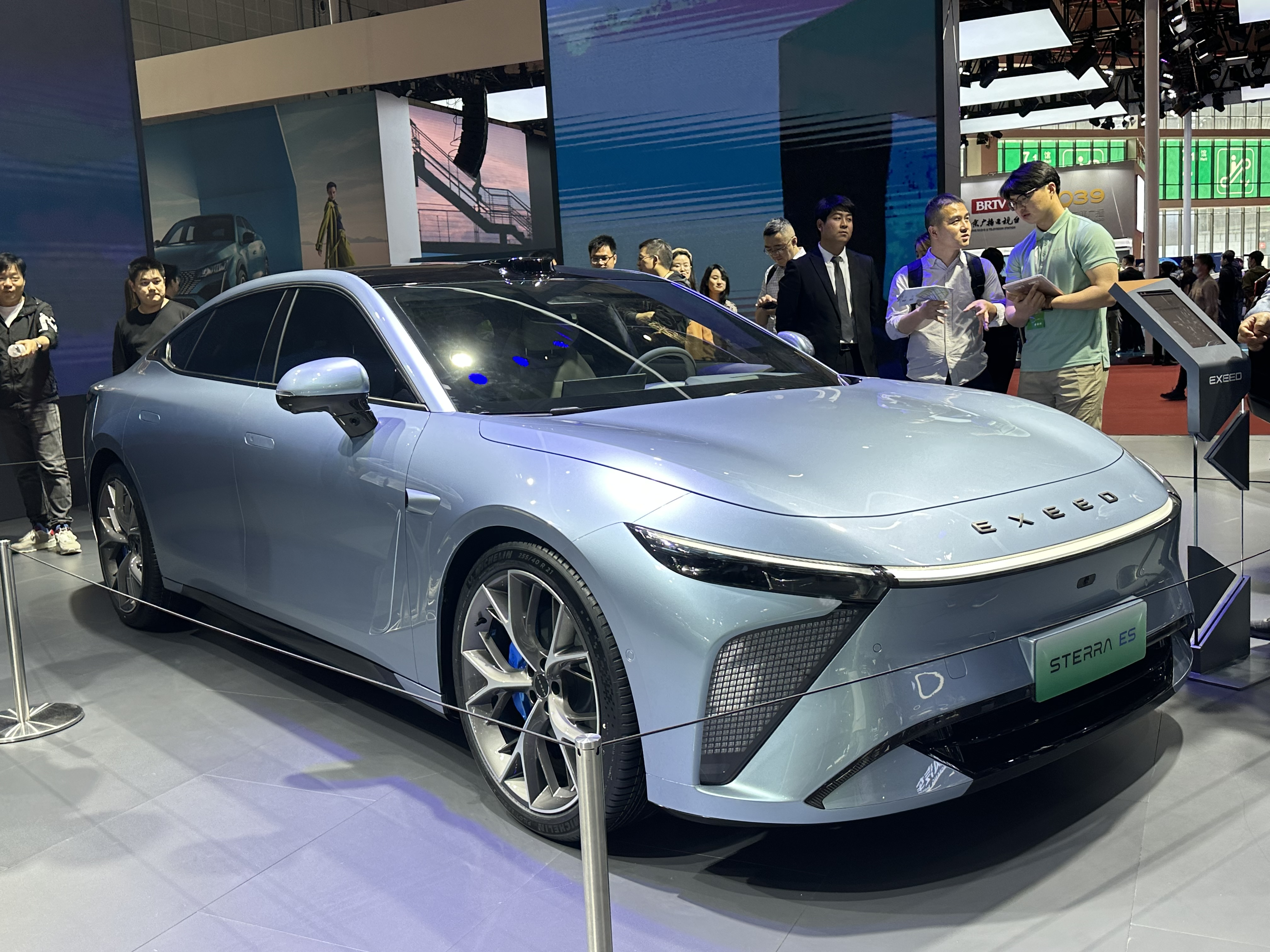
Exeed Sterra ES

=== Jetour ===
Jetour (Chinese: 捷途; pinyin: Jiétú; lit. 'victory road') is Chery's SUV brand launched in 2018. The brand mainly produces mid-size crossovers and SUVs, targeting Chinese families living in tier-three and tier-four cities who travel long-distance frequently.

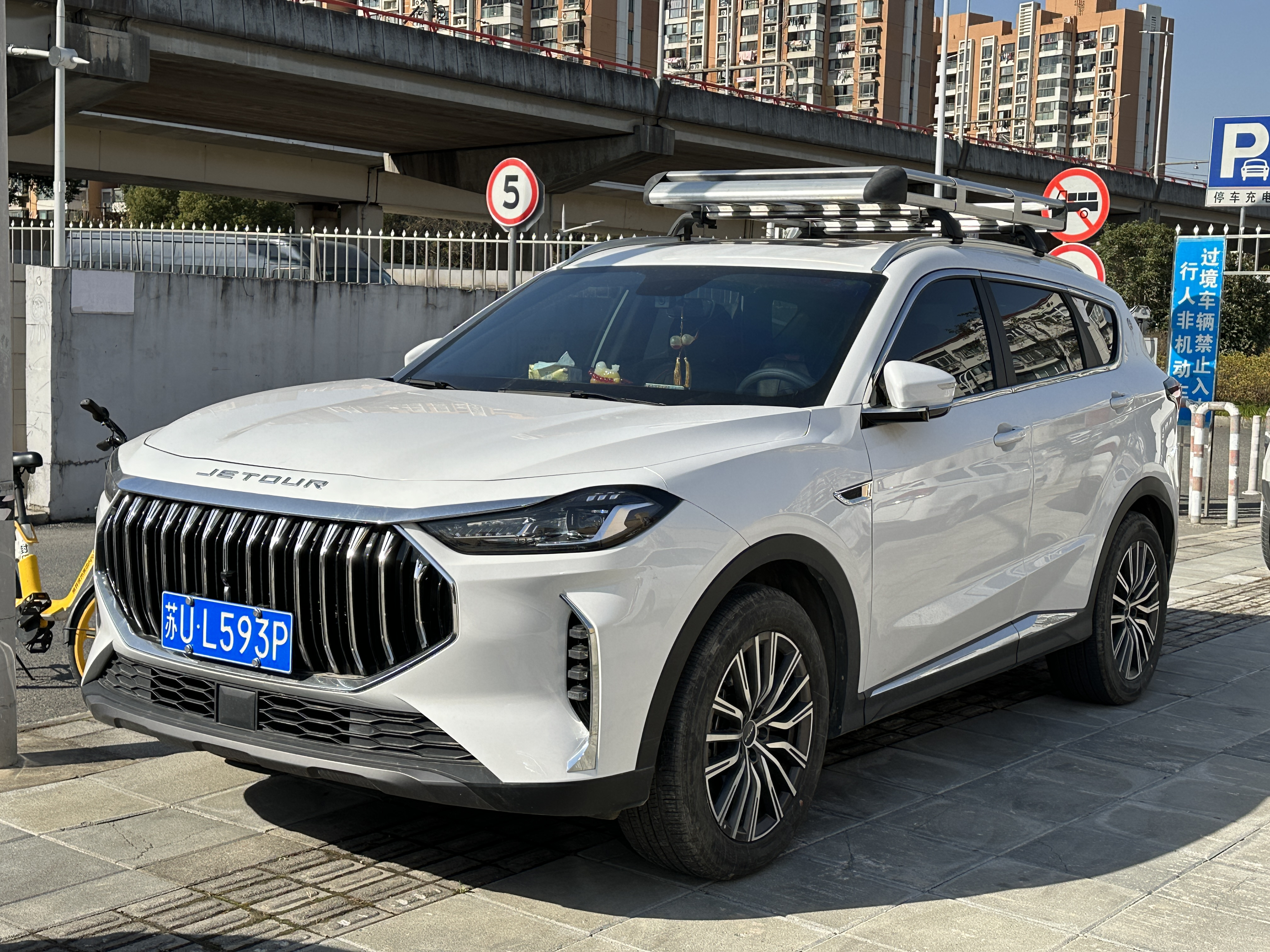
Jetour X70 Plus

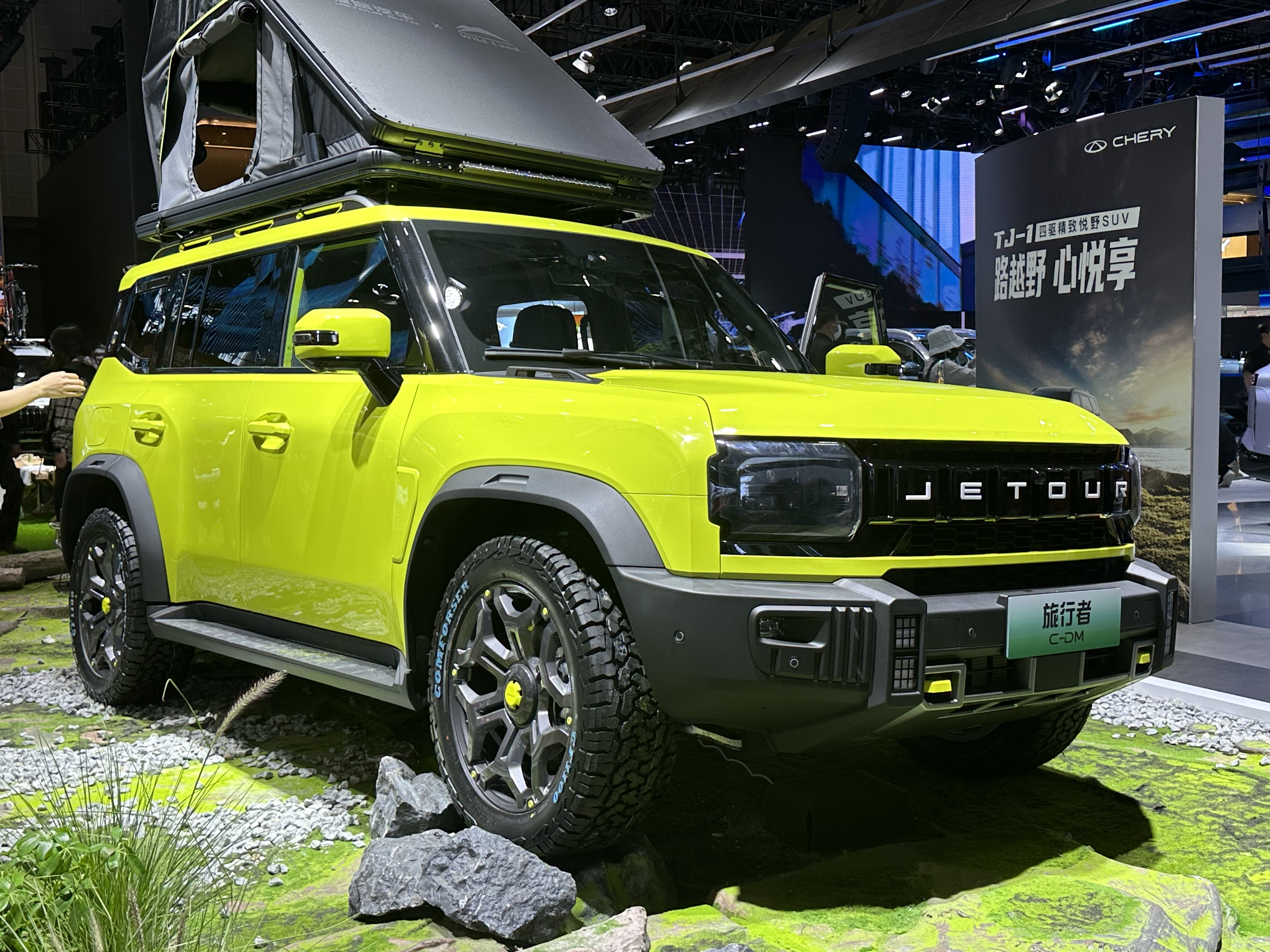
Jetour Traveller

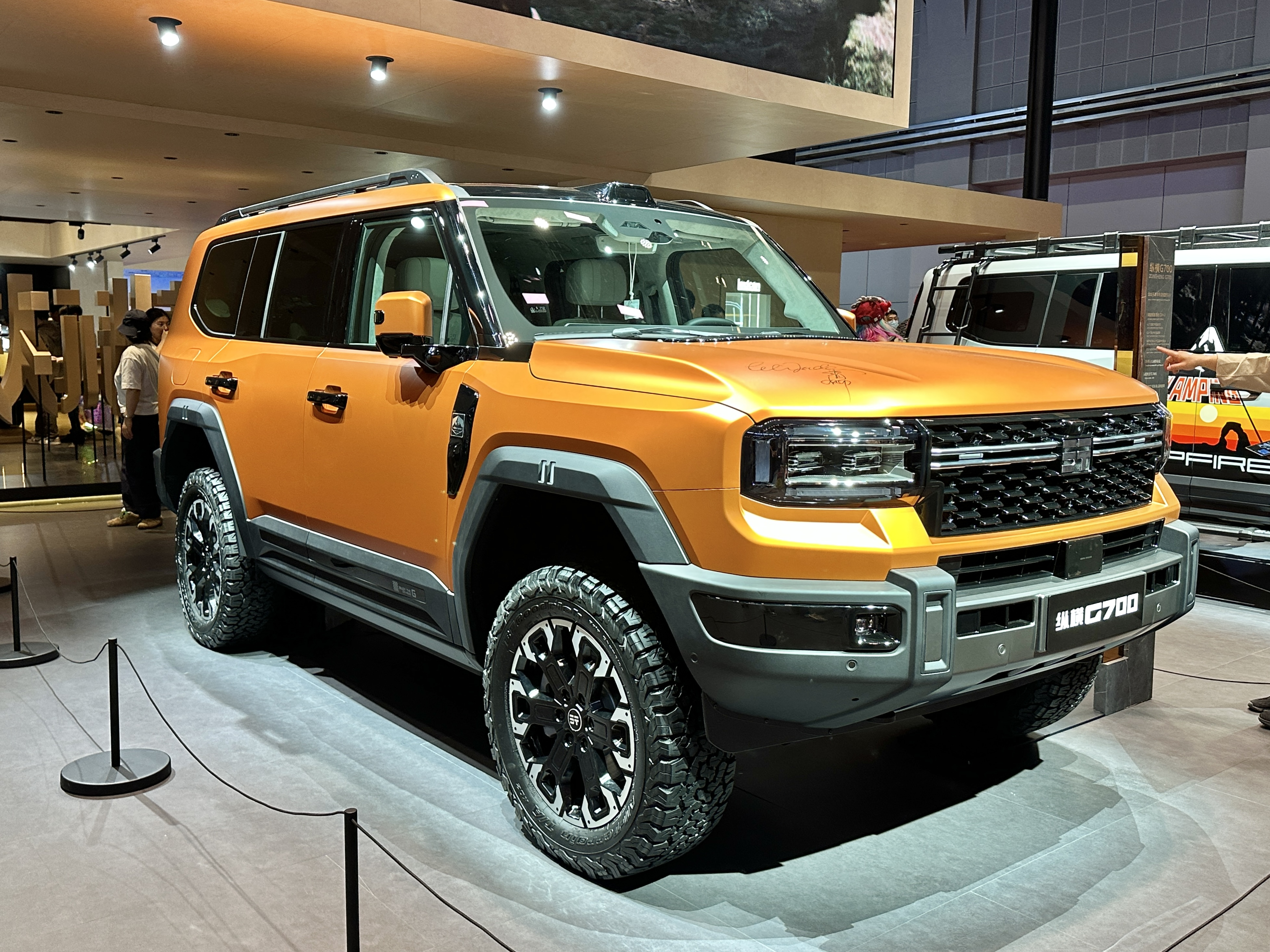
Jetour Zongheng G700

=== iCar/iCaur ===
iCar (iCaur outside China) is Chery's electric vehicle brand established in April 2023. According to Chery, the brand targets younger people aged 25–35 who are pursuing new careers.

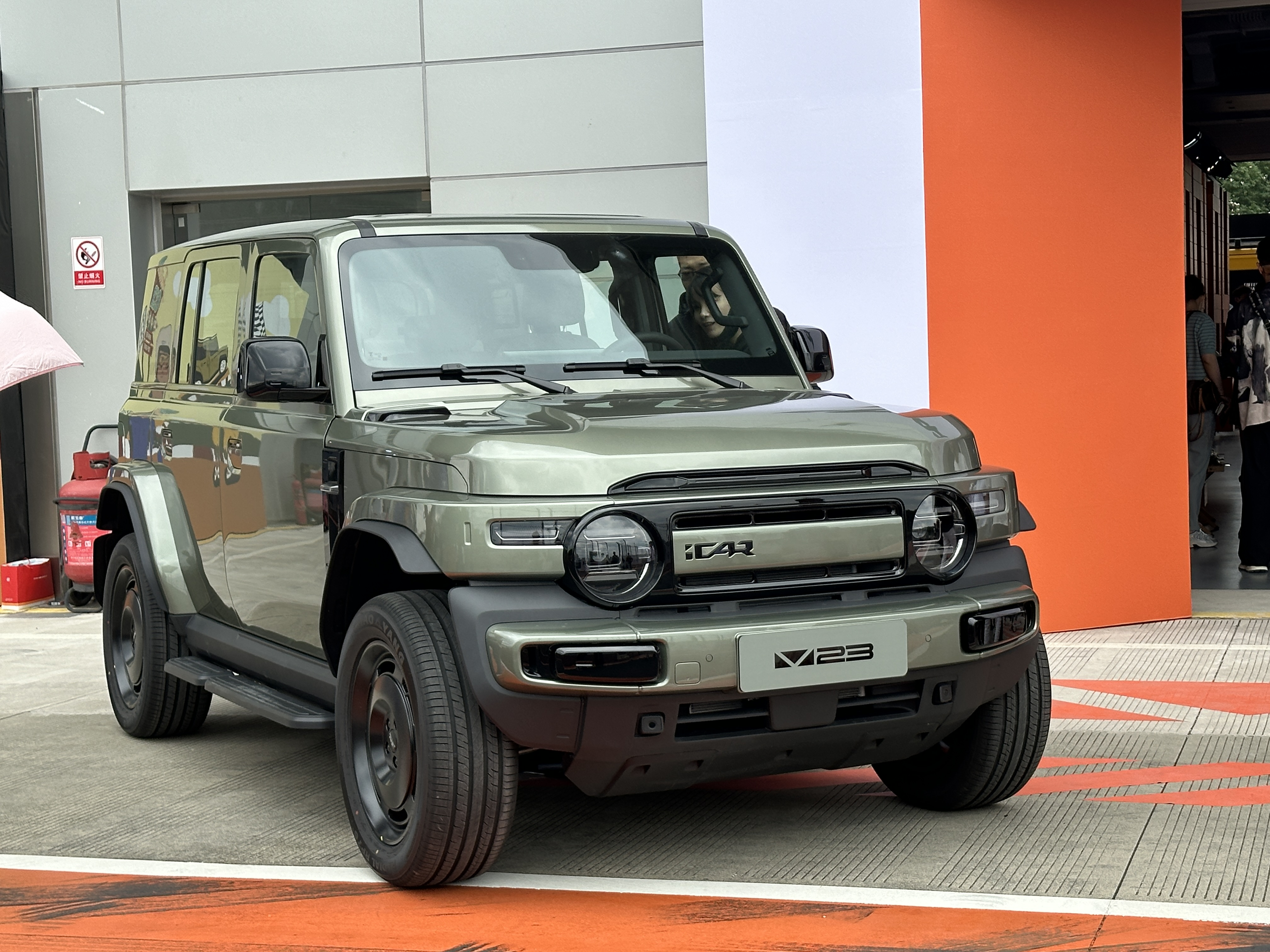
iCar V23

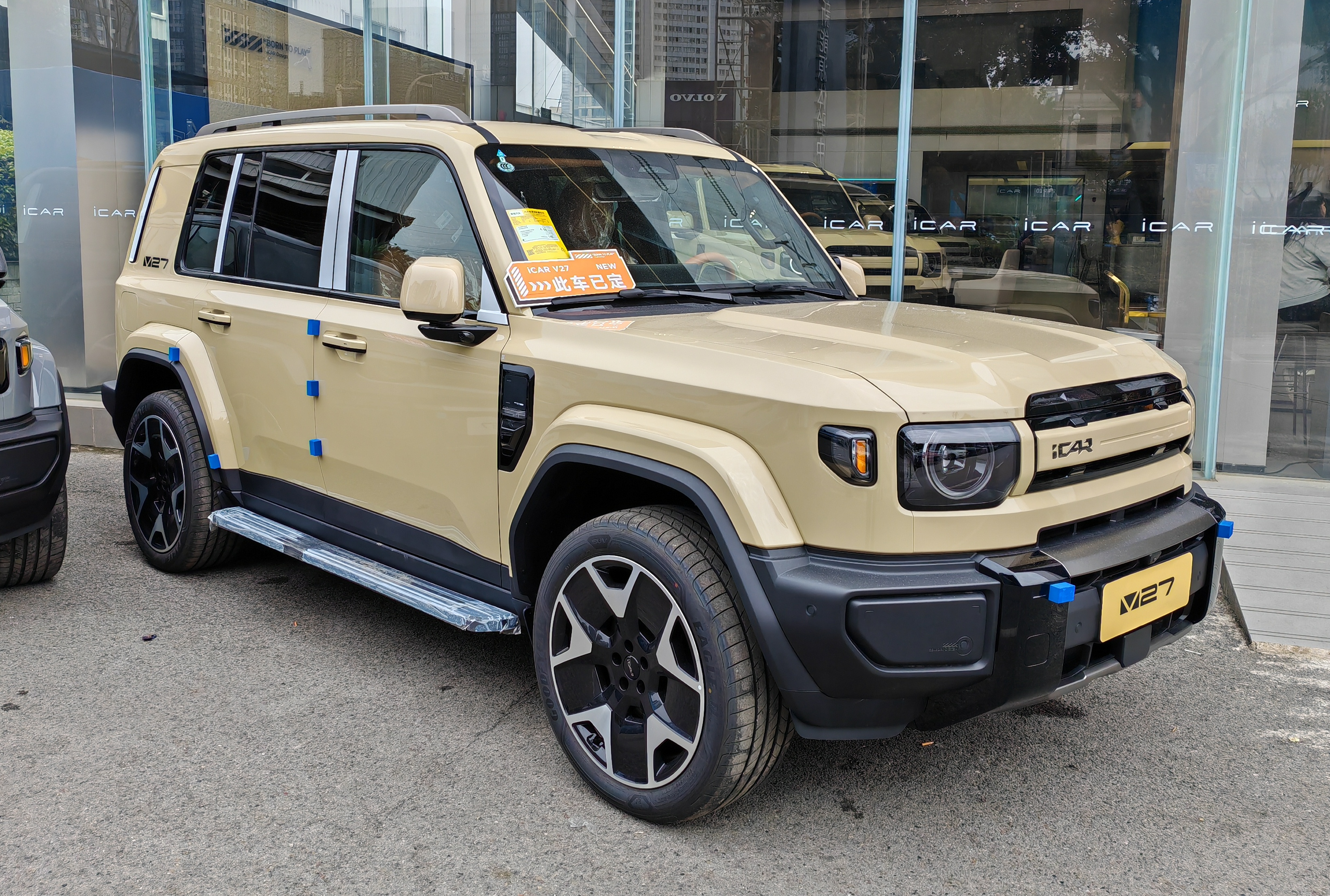
iCar V27

=== Luxeed ===
Luxeed (Chinese: 智界; pinyin: Zhìjiè) is Chery's premium electric vehicle brand in collaboration with Huawei under Harmony Intelligent Mobility Alliance (HIMA).

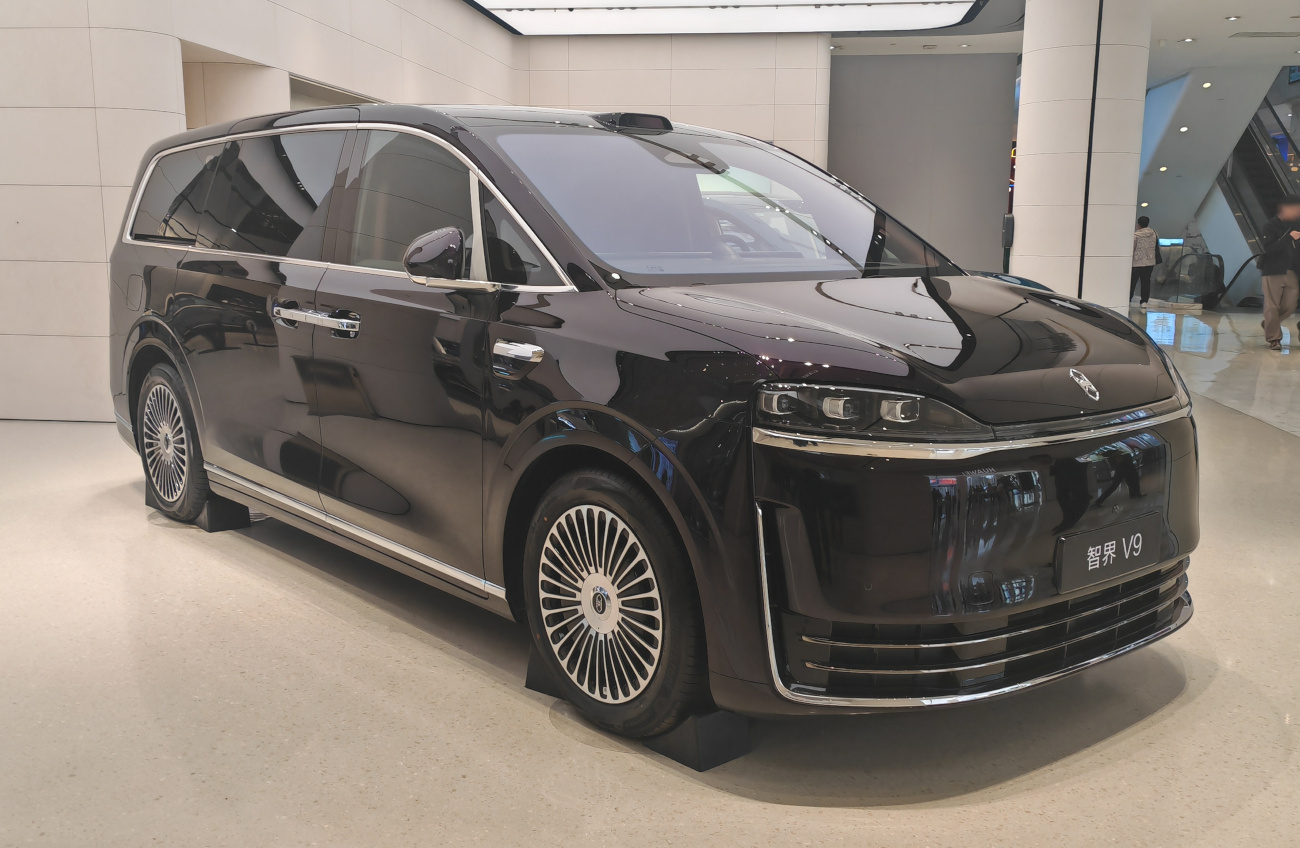
Luxeed V9

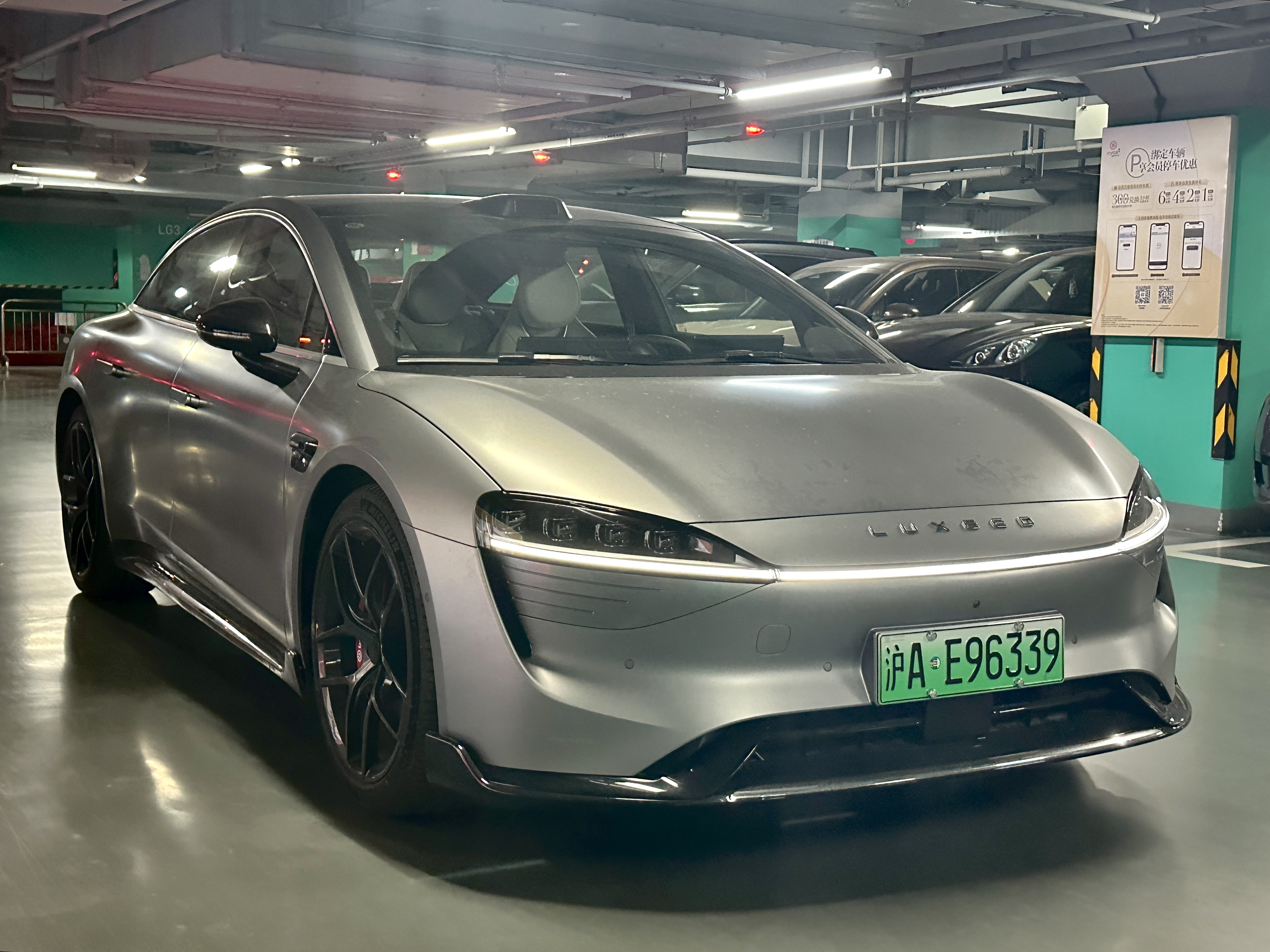
Luxeed S7

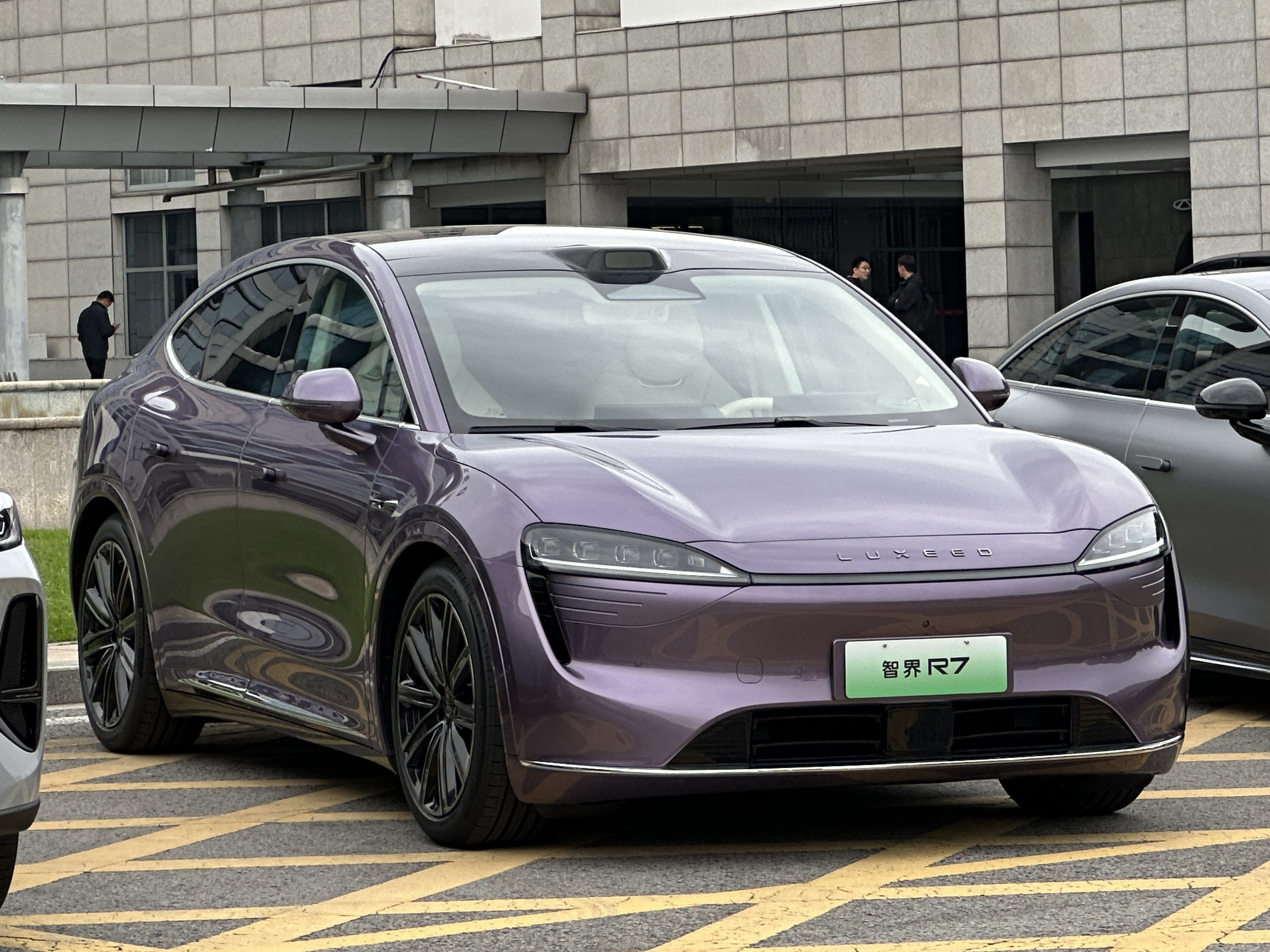
Luxeed R7

=== Rely ===
Rely brand was defunct during 2013–2025. In April 2025, Chery announced to revive Rely brand as its electric pickup brand, covering ICE, BEV, EREV, and PHEV variants.

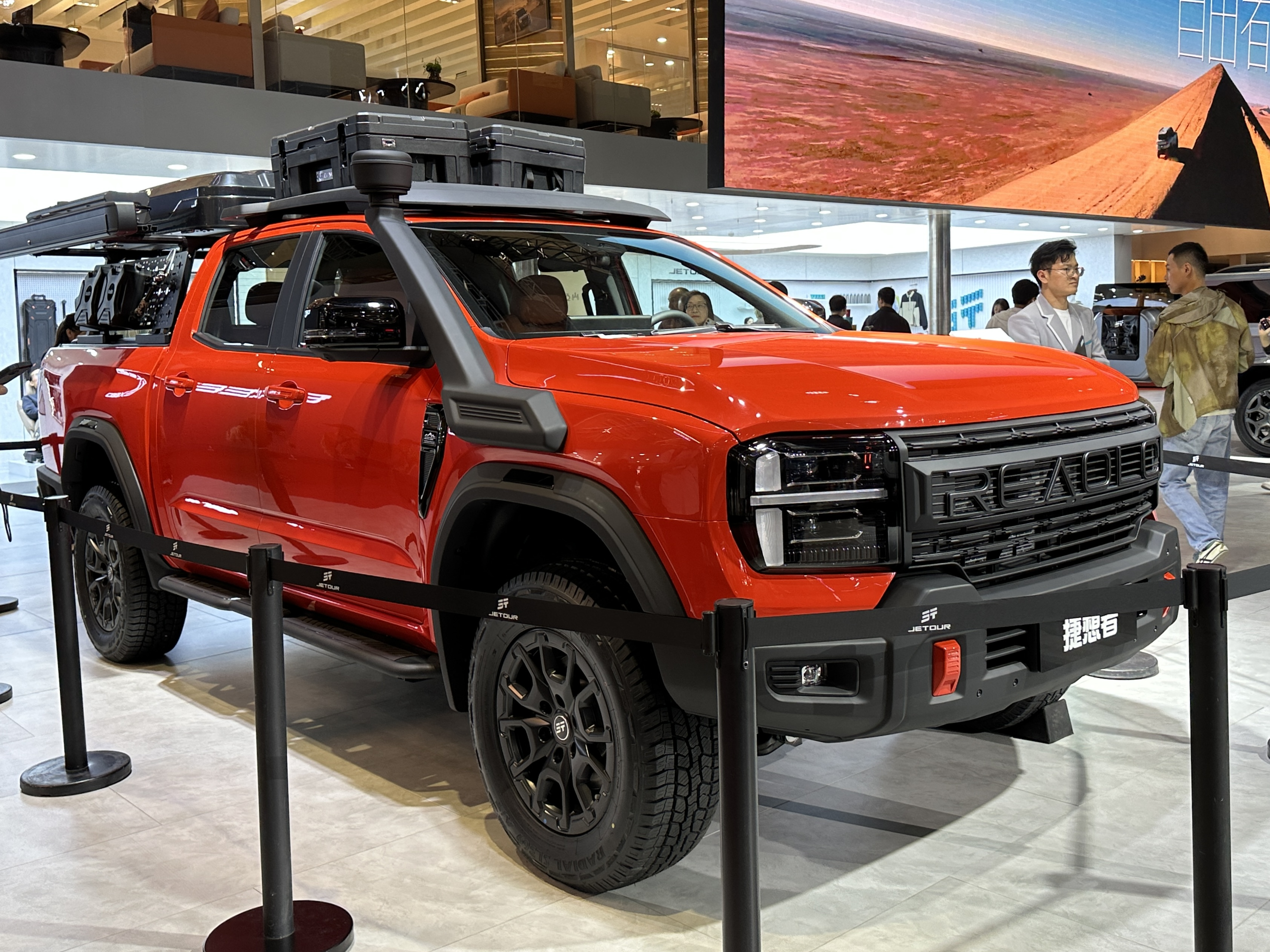
Rely Reaolc

=== Overseas brands ===
Chery has several brands that are only used in overseas markets: Omoda, Jaecoo, Exlantix, Aiqar and Lepas.

Omoda and Jaecoo were simultaneously introduced in April 2023 at an international dealership and journalist convention in Wuhu, Anhui, although Omoda has been selling vehicles in Russia since 2022. Positioned above the Chery brand, Omoda and Jaecoo are part of Chery International, the company's export division. In Iran, the brands are known as Ecoda and Lucano respectively.

Exlantix, a brand consisting of rebadged Exeed Sterra electric vehicles, was introduced in Russia in March 2024.

Aiqar, derived from the Chinese market iCar brand, is an electric vehicle brand of Chery International that became available in countries such as Armenia, Georgia, Cambodia, Uzbekistan, and Curaçao. It sells rebranded versions of iCar and Chery New Energy models.

Another brand called Lepas was introduced in April 2025.

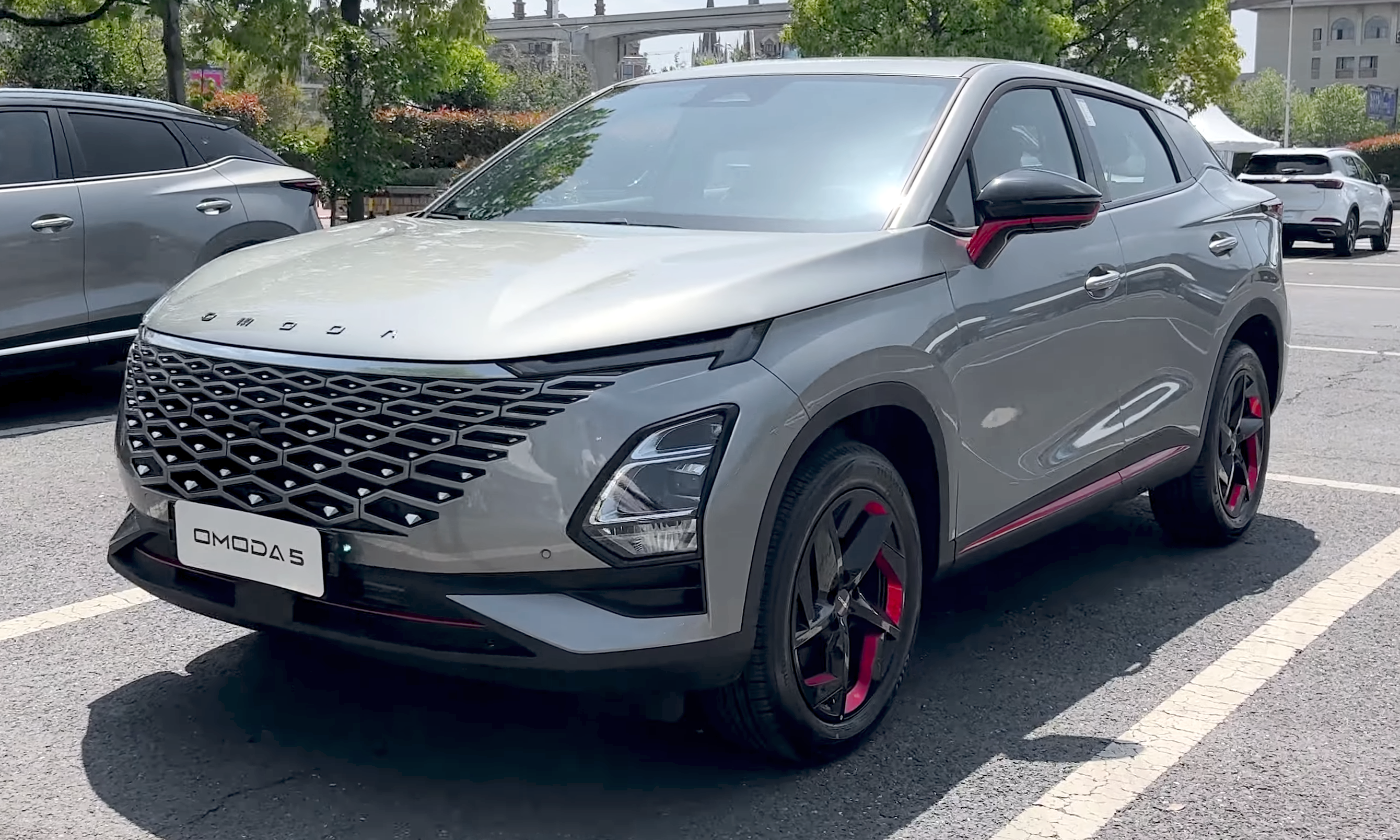
Omoda C5

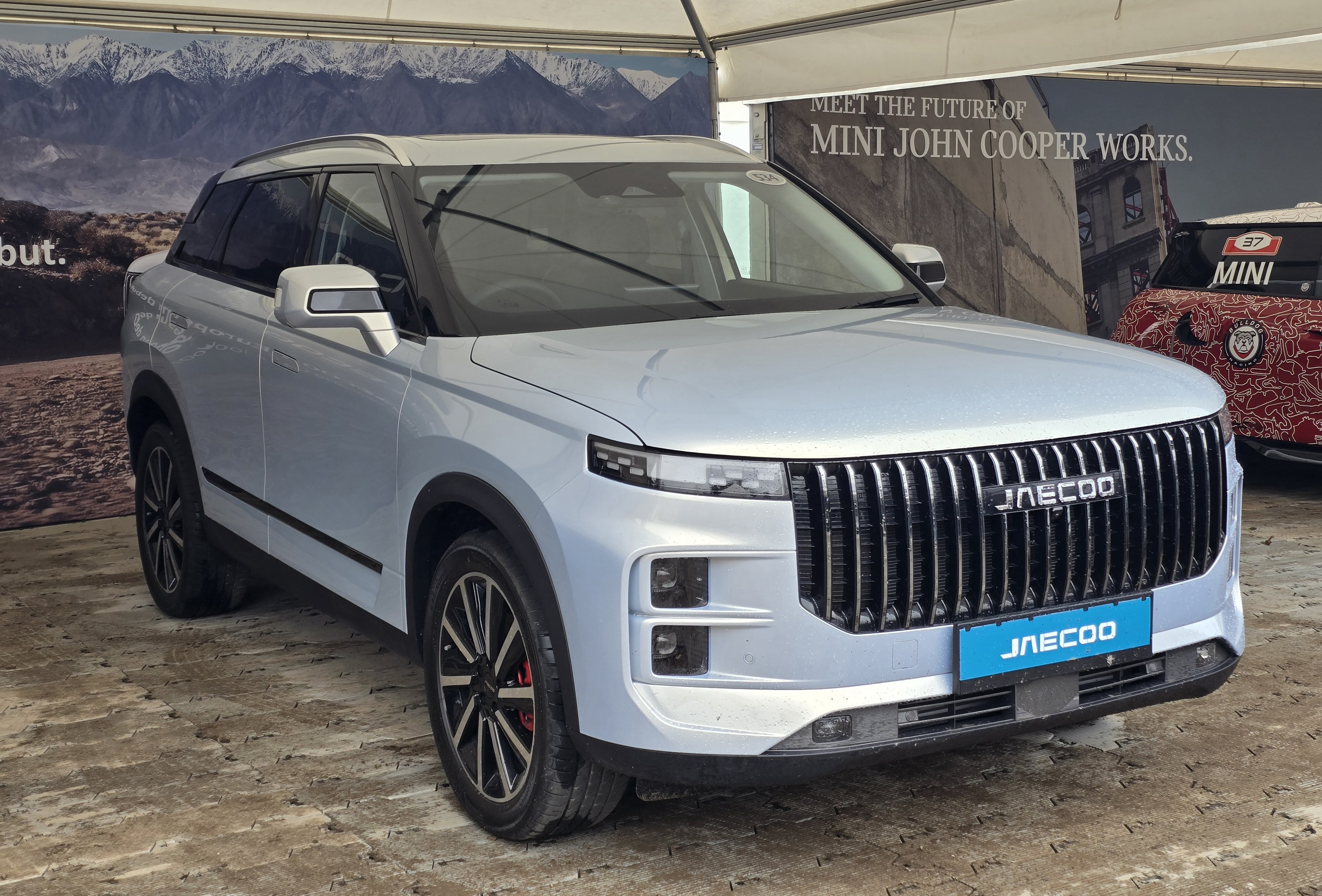
Jaecoo J7

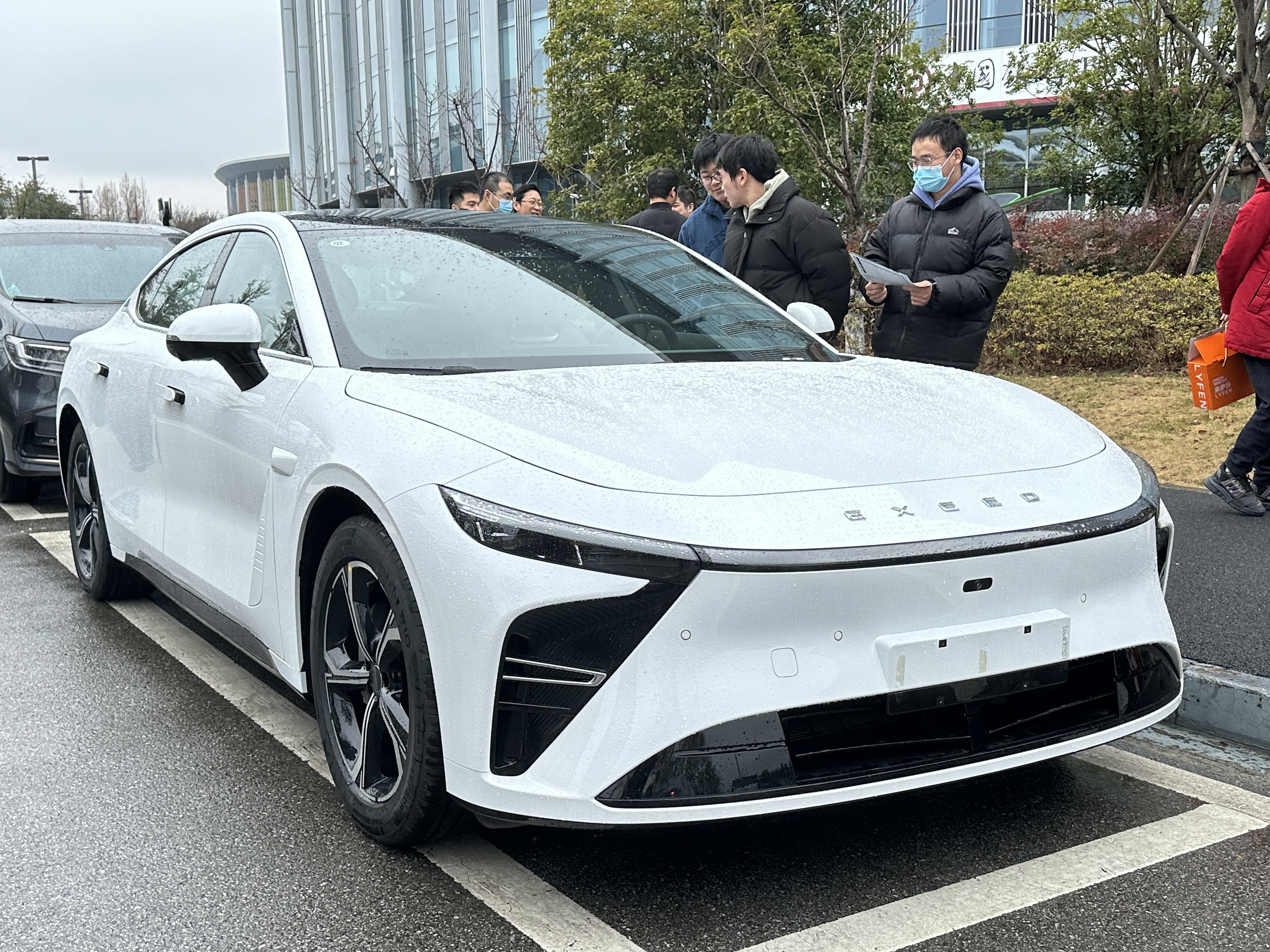
Exlantix ES

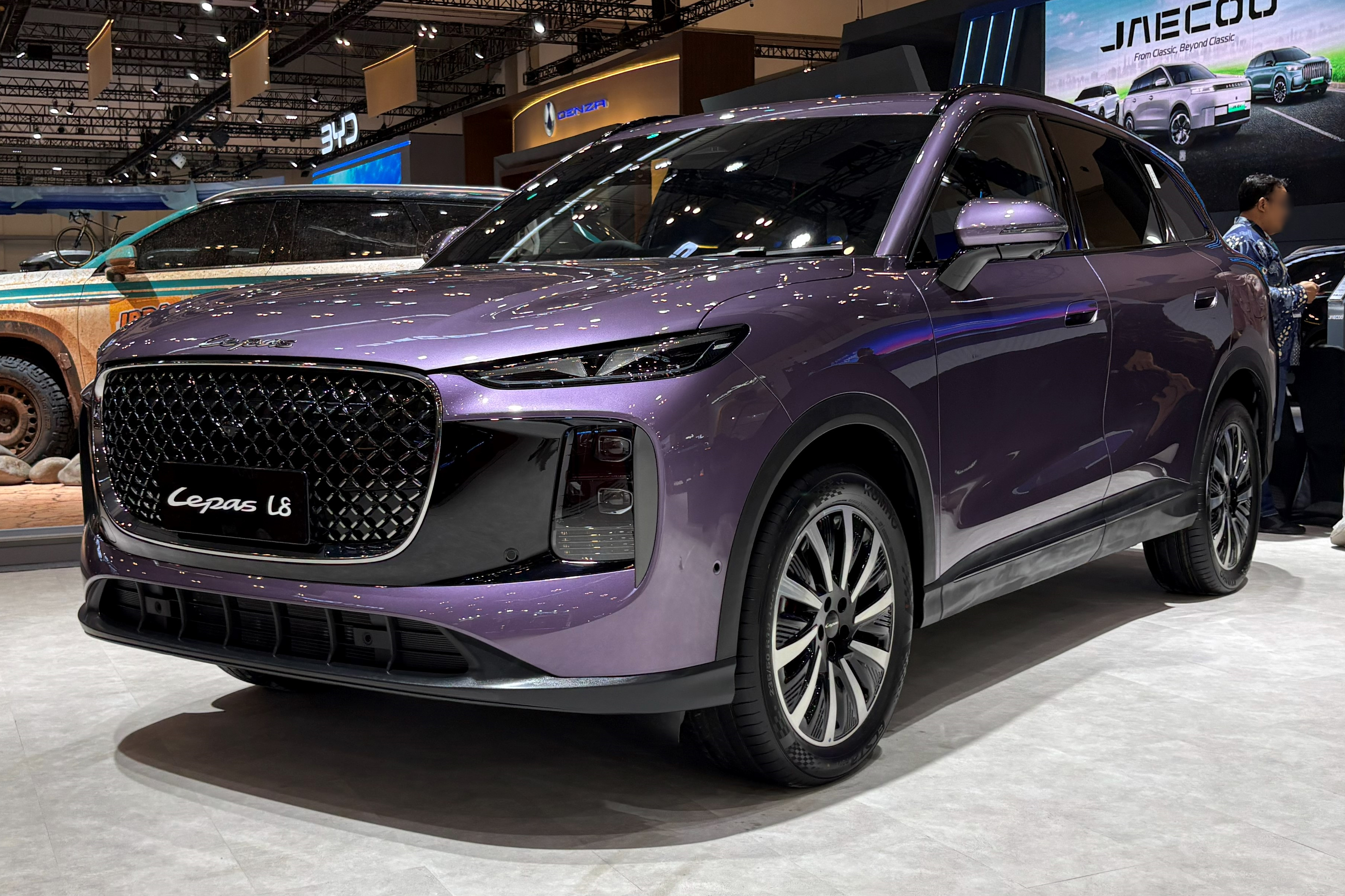
Lepas L8

=== Former brands ===
==== Riich ====
The Riich brand was discontinued in 2012.

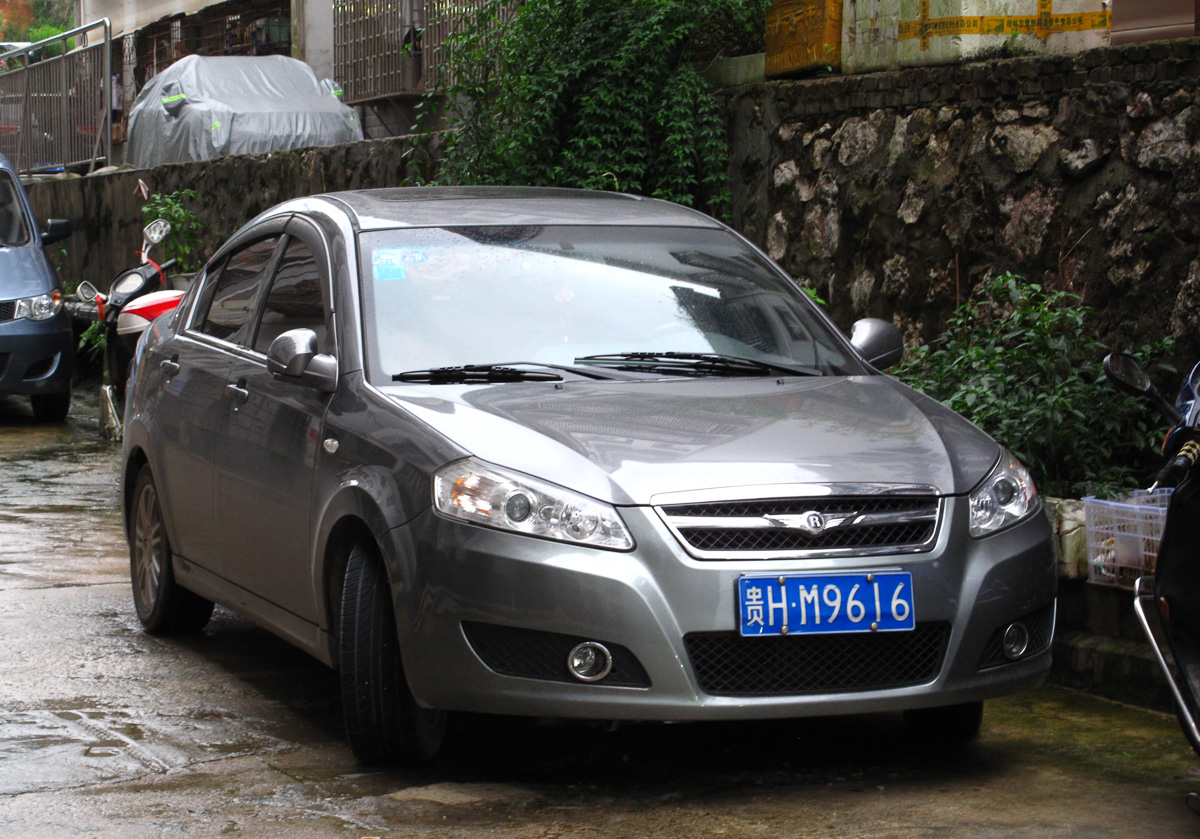
Riich G3

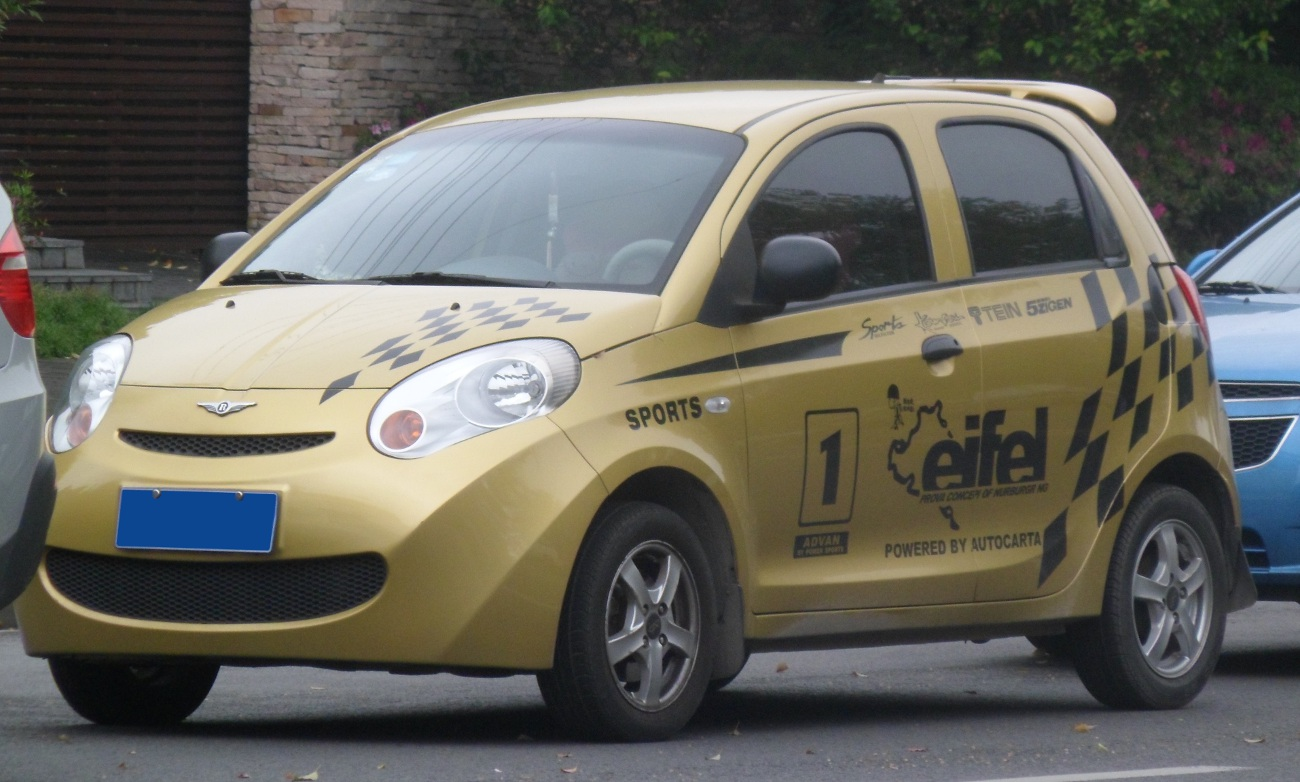
Riich M1

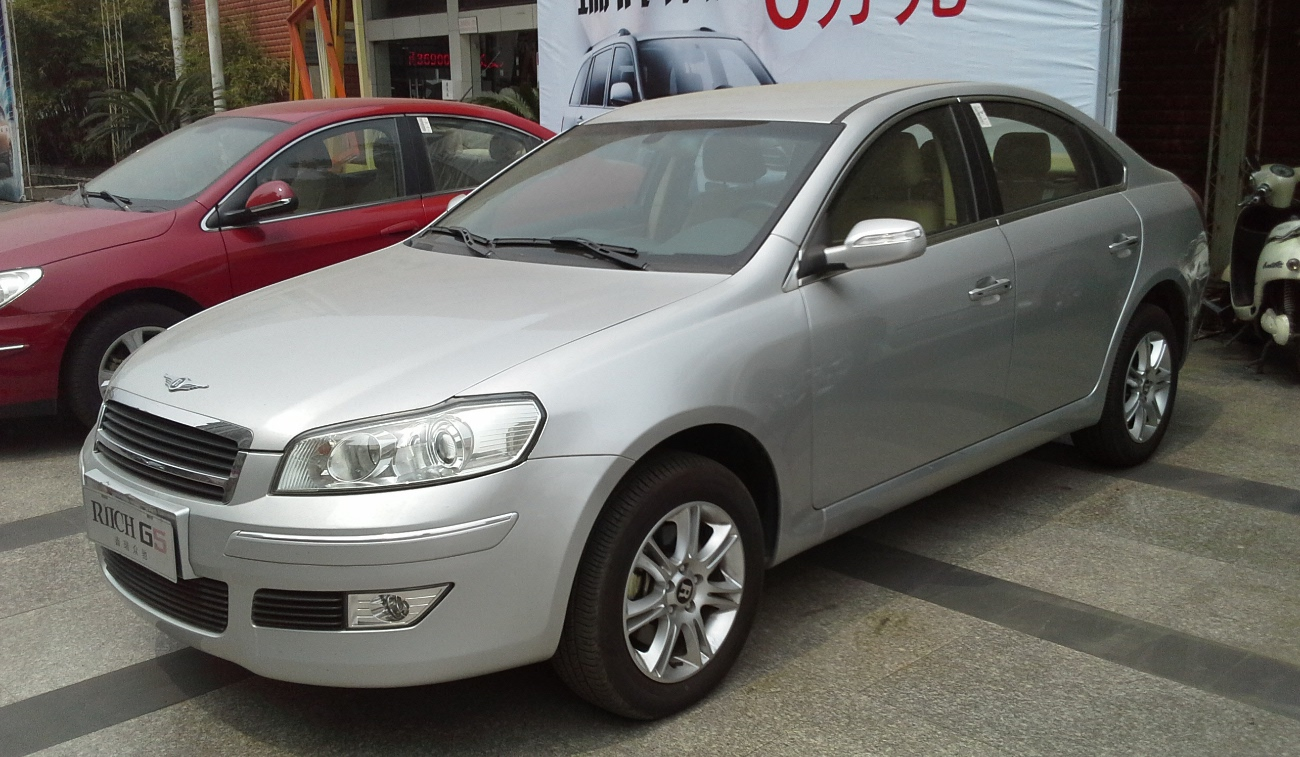
Riich G5

== Safety ==
Chery established a simulation department, according to its chief engineer. It opened a crash test laboratory in Wuhu in 2010. According to the company, the laboratory carries out frontal, offset-frontal, side-impact, rear-impact and rollover tests, and conducts more than 1,500 full-scale crash tests a year. In its 2025 annual report, the company said that 60 models had received five-star safety ratings in various global assessments.

Chery models are fitted with multiple airbags, and the Tiggo 9 offers a far-side airbag and long curtain airbags. The company also says it has developed sunroof and rear-window airbags, for occupant protection in rollovers and rear-end collisions respectively.

In October 2016, Chery conducted a public three-vehicle chain rear-end crash test in Wuhu, involving two Tiggo 7 vehicles and a truck, and streamed the test live. The first Tiggo 7 struck the second at 50 km/h, propelling it into the truck at 26.2 km/h.

Chery has described a system that monitors the battery pack for damage after an underbody impact and alerts the driver.

Chery announced that in April 2026 a Tiggo 9 was subjected to simultaneous 50 km/h frontal and 40 km/h rear impacts at its crash test laboratory. In October 2026, Chery staged a public crash test at its Longshan crash laboratory in Wuhu before invited media, industry specialists and owners. A Tiggo 7 collided frontally with a 2.9-tonne truck at a reported impact speed of 50 km/h; Chery said the passenger cell was not deformed, the doors could be opened, the airbags and belt pretensioners deployed, and the car's eCall system placed an emergency call automatically.

== Technology ==
=== Chery Super Hybrid (CSH) ===
Chery Super Hybrid (CSH) is a family of hybrid powertrains that Chery introduced for overseas markets from 2025, offered in both conventional full-hybrid (HEV) and plug-in hybrid (PHEV) forms. The company began developing hybrid technology in 2001. In plug-in form, CSH is used in the Chery Tiggo 7, Tiggo 8, Tiggo 9 and Arrizo 8, while the full-hybrid version powers the Tiggo 4 — sold in some markets as the Tiggo Cross — and the Tiggo 7.

Positioned as Chery's flagship SUV, the Tiggo 9 CSH pairs a 1.5-litre turbocharged dedicated hybrid engine with a three-speed dedicated hybrid transmission (3DHT) and three electric motors driving both axles, providing all-wheel drive. The dedicated hybrid engine has a quoted thermal efficiency of up to 44.5%. Chery quotes a combined system output of 428 PS (315 kW) and 580 Nm of torque, a 0–100 km/h time of 5.4 seconds, an electric-only WLTP range of up to 147 km, a combined WLTP range of up to 1,050 km and a 30–80% DC fast-charge time of 18 minutes.

The CSH battery is rated IP68 for dust and water resistance and is specified to operate between −35 °C and 60 °C. In June 2025, Chery held a demonstration in Jakarta in which a CSH battery pack was submerged in a metre-deep tank of seawater for more than 53 hours; the pack was later reinstalled into a Tiggo 8 CSH, and the vehicle was driven to demonstrate that the battery remained functional. In April 2026, Chery Malaysia held a public demonstration in which a CSH battery pack was exposed to a petrol fire for 80 seconds, with temperatures exceeding 1,000 °C; the pack remained intact with no thermal runaway.

=== Super Intelligent Valet Parking (SIVP) ===
Super Intelligent Valet Parking (SIVP) is a driverless parking and retrieval system developed within the Chery Group. It offers two functions, marketed by Chery as One Step Home and One Tap Departure: the former searches for a vacant space and parks the car once the occupants have left it, while the latter drives the car from its space to a pick-up point selected in a smartphone app. The user can follow the car's progress in the app.

Chery describes the system as built on environmental perception, local path planning and vehicle motion control. The company says the system uses a one-stage end-to-end large-model algorithm to analyse its surroundings and plan a safe path. In operation the car moves through the car park at low speed, detects pedestrians and yields to them, and identifies parked cars and other obstacles and passes them where necessary. While SIVP is active the car is limited to 10 km/h; if the system judges a situation too complex, it stops at a safe location and notifies the user through the app. The user can monitor the car, pause the manoeuvre or take over control at any time. While reversing into a space, the car builds real-time, centimetre-level 3D maps of its surroundings and adjusts its position to park centrally in tight spaces. Operation is confined to car parks that have been mapped for the system, which the car communicates with through Car-to-X communication, and newly supported car parks reach cars through over-the-air updates. The system can navigate between levels to park or to reach a pick-up point, and in the launch specification it used 27 sensors and cameras, including a 128-channel direct time-of-flight lidar and millimetre-wave radar able to detect objects up to 280 m ahead and 200 m to the side.

== Partnerships ==
=== Joint ventures ===
==== Chery Jaguar Land Rover ====
In March 2012, Chery and the UK-based luxury carmaker Jaguar Land Rover (JLR) agreed to invest an initial US$2.78 billion in a new China-based joint venture that will sell and manufacture Jaguar and Land Rover vehicles and engines, as well as establish a research and development facility. It is the first JLR facility outside the UK that engages in full-scale production operations. The joint venture received regulatory approval in September 2012. A production base was built in Changshu, a county-level city close to Shanghai. The first Chinese-made Range Rover Evoque rolled off the production line on 21 October 2014 from Chery Jaguar Land Rover's plant in Changshu, Jiangsu.

In May 2025, JLR revealed that the Chery Jaguar Land Rover would cease to produce before the end of 2026 after the joint venture with lost $18.7 million in the 2024 fiscal year. The production of the Jaguar XE, XF, and E-Pace would be ended in September 2025, and the Range Rover Evoque and Land Rover Discovery Sport would be ended by the end of 2026.

=== Investments ===
==== Kaiyi Auto (18% stake) ====
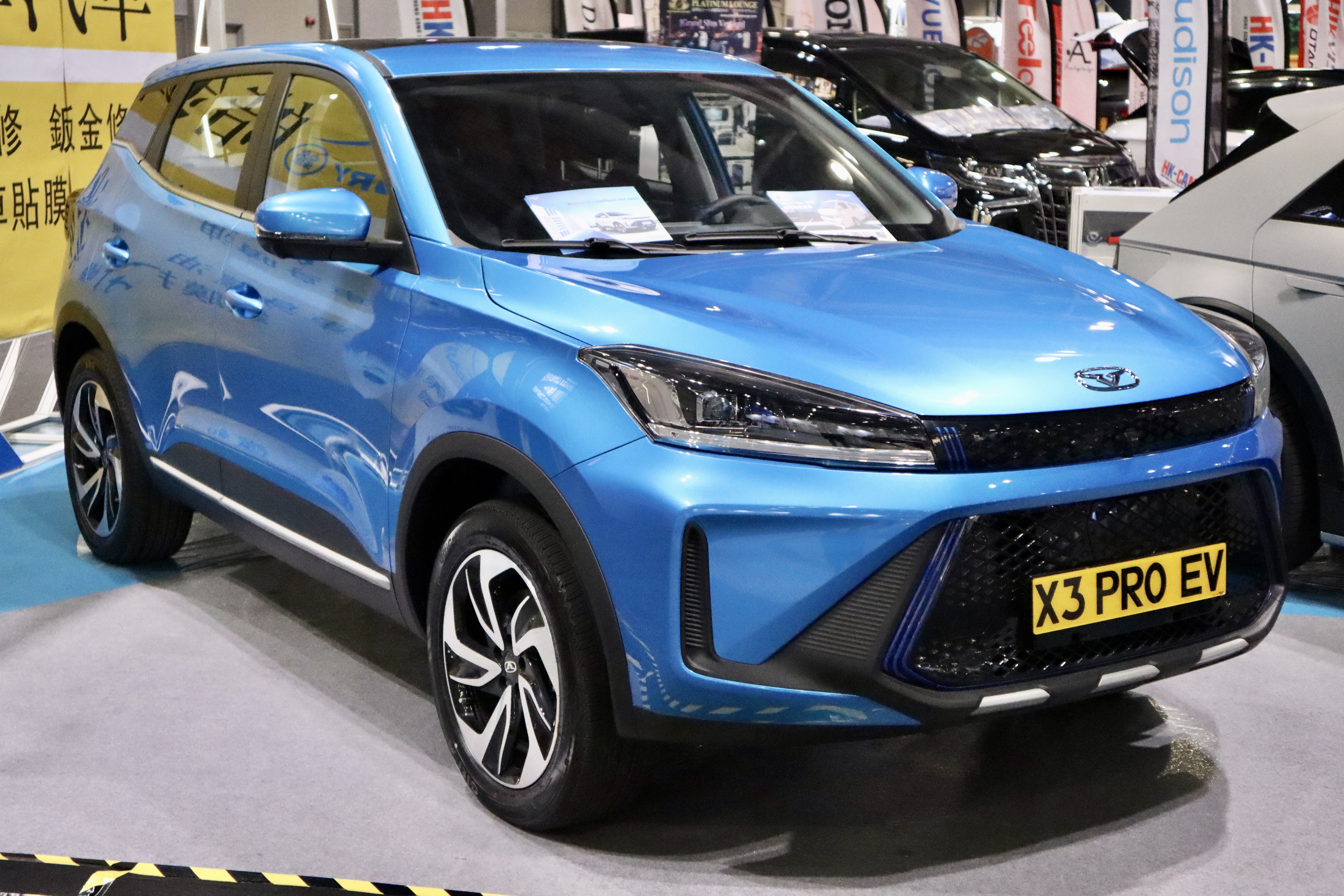
Kaiyi Showjet

- In 2014, Chery established Cowin Auto as a subsidiary target at producing budget vehicles for young consumers.
- In 2018, following a restructuring of the Chery shareholding, part of Cowin was sold to the government of Yibin City through the subsidiaries Yibin Auto Industry Development Investment Co., Ltd. and Sichuan Yibin Pushi (PUSH) Group Co., Ltd. which took possession of 50.5% and 0.5% respectively at the price of RMB 2.5 billion. Chery retained a 49% stake. The company's headquarters was moved to Yibin, Sichuan and renamed to Yibin Kaiyi Automobile Co., Ltd.
- In 2022, Chery continued to reduce its shareholding in Kaiyi Auto and transferred it to the Yibin Municipal Government, which Chery retained a 18% stake.

==== Ebro (40% stake) ====
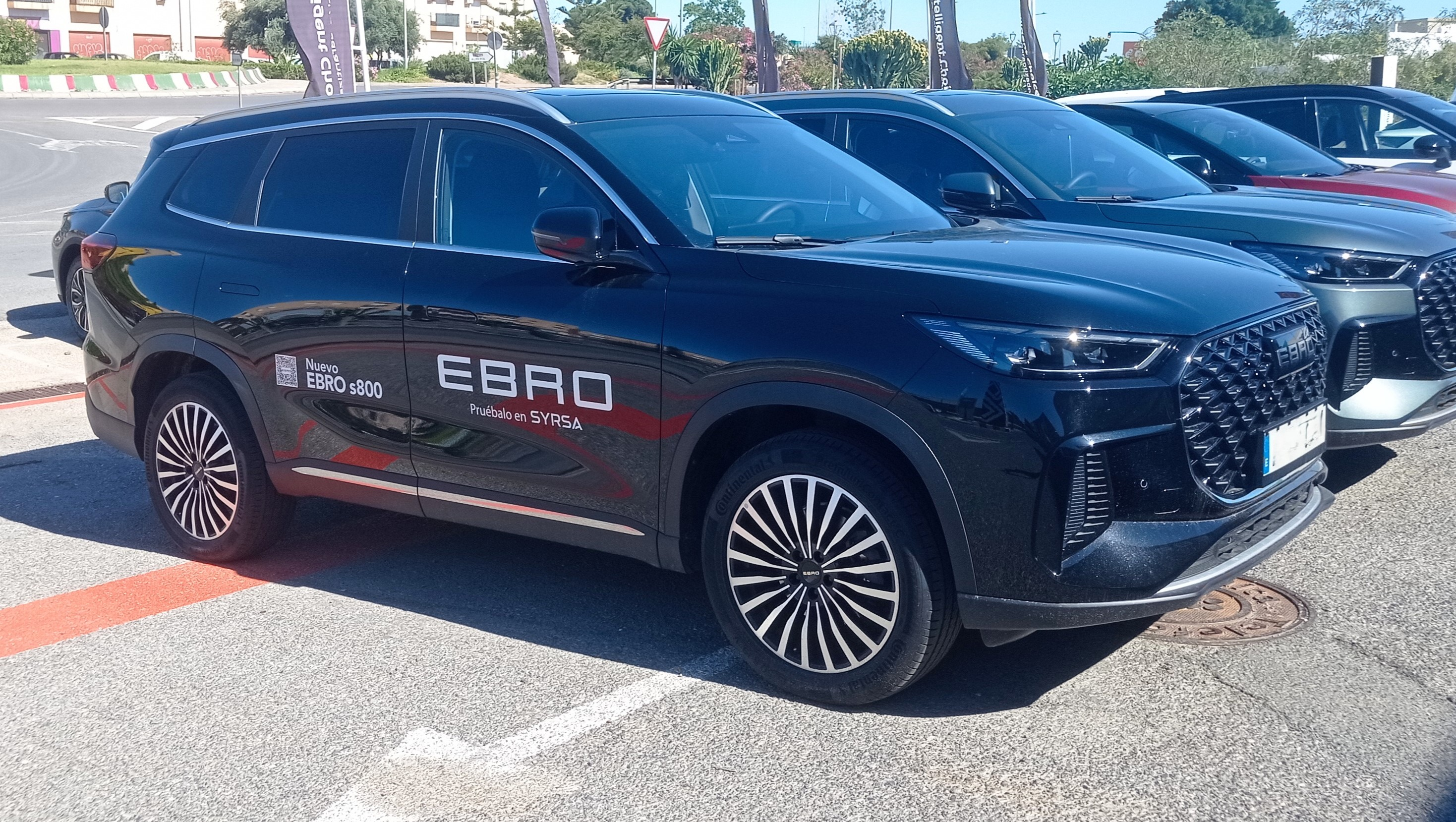
Ebro S800

- In 2024, Chery and Spanish manufacture EV Motor established a joint venture to assembly Chery vehicles under the revived Ebro brand at the Barcelona plant. In November 2024, assembly of the Chery Tiggo 7 and Tiggo 8 models began and the two models were renamed Ebro S700 and Ebro S800.

==== Caoc Chery (49.3% stake) ====
- In November 2017, the Brazilian automotive company Caoa acquired 50.7% of the Brazilian operations of Chery.

==== KG Mobility (10% stake) ====
- In September 2026, Chery acquired 10% stake in KG Mobility at a price of 75 million US dollar.

==== Qoros (12% stake, defunct) ====
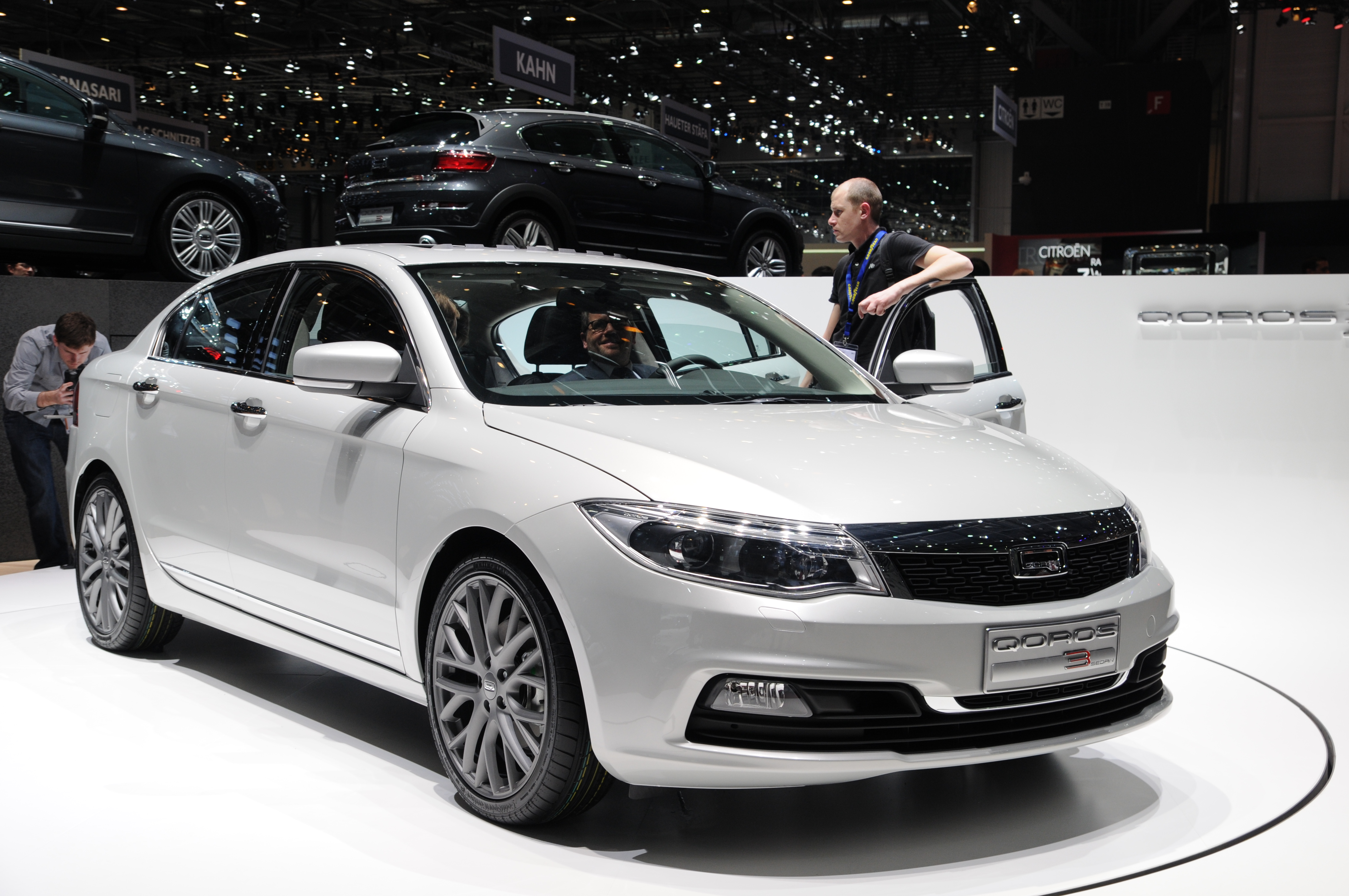
Qoros 3

- In December 2007, Chery and Israel Corporation founded Qoros as a joint venture at 50:50 under the name of Chery Quantum Automotive Corporation (CQAC), which later renamed to Qoros Auto in November 2011.
- In January 2021, Baoneng Group took over 63% of the shares in Qoros, leaving Chery with 25% and Kenon Holdings (a subsidiary of Israel Corporation) with just 12%.
- In January 2026, Qoros applied for bankruptcy.

=== Overseas collaboration ===
In 2007, Chrysler planned a cooperation with Chery that would have seen the Chery A1 sold as a Dodge-brand car in the US and abroad. The plan would have quickly increased the Chrysler small car stable, and the two companies participated in a signing ceremony in late 2007. In early 2008, a similar deal was reached between Chrysler and Nissan, however, and the Chrysler-Chery cooperation was abandoned. Around the time of the 2009 Chrysler Chapter 11 reorganization, Chrysler discussed the possibility of an asset sale with Chery, but this also fell through. In the same year, Fiat and Chery signed a memorandum of understanding for the creation of a car-making joint venture. Intended to begin operations in 2009, it was to manufacture Fiat and Alfa Romeo-branded products for the Chinese market and be located in Wuhu. The deal was put on hold in March 2009. Since 2011, Fiat produced cars in China with local partner GAC Group.

In May 2011, Chery and Fuji Heavy Industries (currently Subaru Corporation) had an agreement to establish a joint venture to manufacture Subaru vehicles in China. The plan was to establish a 30 billion yen plant in Dalian with initial annual capacity of 50,000 cars, that would expand to 150,000 units. Subaru vehicles has been imported to China since 2004. The joint venture proposal was rejected by the Chinese National Development and Reform Commission by September 2011, as the major shareholder of Fuji Heavy Industries, Toyota already has two joint ventures in China, which is the maximum amount allowed. Later in May 2012, the proposal was rejected for the second time due to production "overcapacity" in the country.

Chery also has automotive component-manufacturing joint ventures with Arvin Meritor, Johnson Controls, and PPG Industries.

In 2020, there were plans for Chery to buy a percentage of Tata Motors in order for Chery to gain entry into the Indian market, and in order for Tata Motors to receive vehicle platform and technology for cars such as the proposed Tata Blackbird. However, due to COVID-19 pandemic and the continuing political tensions over the Chinese/Indian border, reports have indicated that the plans have been shelved.

In July 2025, Chery issued a statement of clarification saying that the company had noticed foreign media reports claiming that it would provide technology and components to an Indian company JSW Group. To avoid misinterpretation and misinformation among the public and investors, Chery clarified that its cooperation with JSW is limited to component supply and does not involve technology transfer.

In June 2026, Tata Motors licensed the Freelander EV platform developed by Chery to underpin its upcoming premium Avinya electric vehicles. Chery will act as a supplier, and the vehicles will be assembled at Tata's new Panapakkam facility in Tamil Nadu, India. On 8 June, in respond to Chinese public concern about the risk of investing in India, Chery specially issued a clarification statement stating that the cooperation agreement being discussed between Chery and India's Tata Group is limited to the supply of vehicle-related components, providing them with automotive parts. Chery has no plans for direct investment or technology transfer in the Indian market.

In June 2026, Nissan and Chery signed a non-binding memorandum of understanding potentially having Chery's Jaecoo and Omoda cars produced in Nissan's UK plant in Sunderland starting as early as 2027.

=== Robotaxi ===
In July 2025, WeRide, a Chinese autonomous driving technology company, was granted a permit form the Shanghai municipal government to operate autonomous robotaxi ride-hailing services in partnership with Chery and Jinjiang Taxi, deploying fully driverless ride-hailing Robotaxis on public roads in the Pudong area.

== Chery Holding and commercial vehicle business ==
Since Chery Automobile was listed in 2025, its commercial vehicle business and passenger vehicle business have been separated. The passenger vehicle business is now held by Chery Automobile, while the commercial vehicle business is held by Chery Holding, with no capital ties between the two. Currently, the Karry Auto, C&C Trucks and Chery & Wanda Buses are hold by Chery Commercial Vehicle, the subsidiary of Chery Holding.

=== Karry Auto ===
Karry Auto is a Chinese market only brand founded by Chery in 2009. It specializes in the production of light commercial vehicles and people carriers for passenger transport.

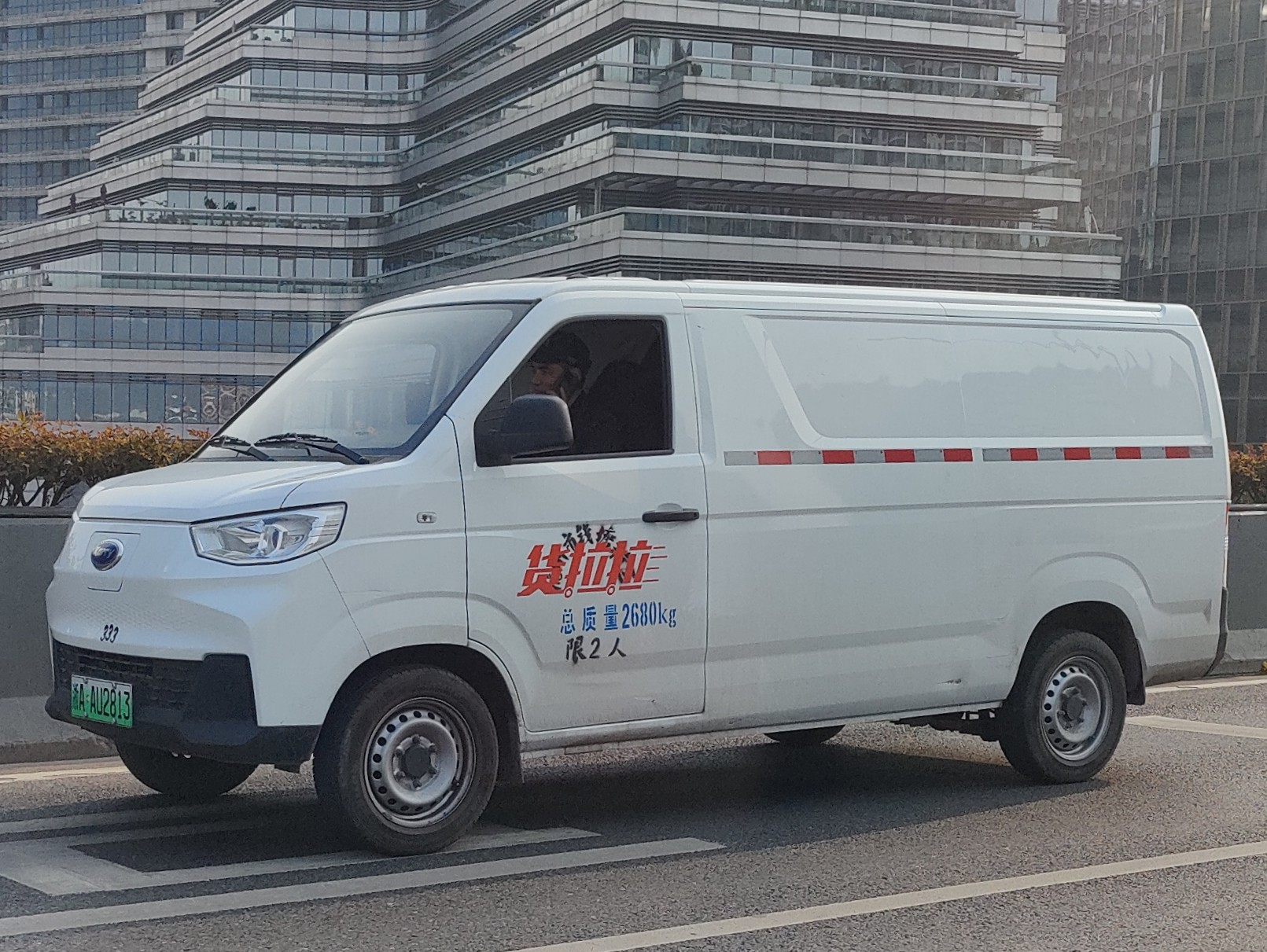
Karry Porpoise

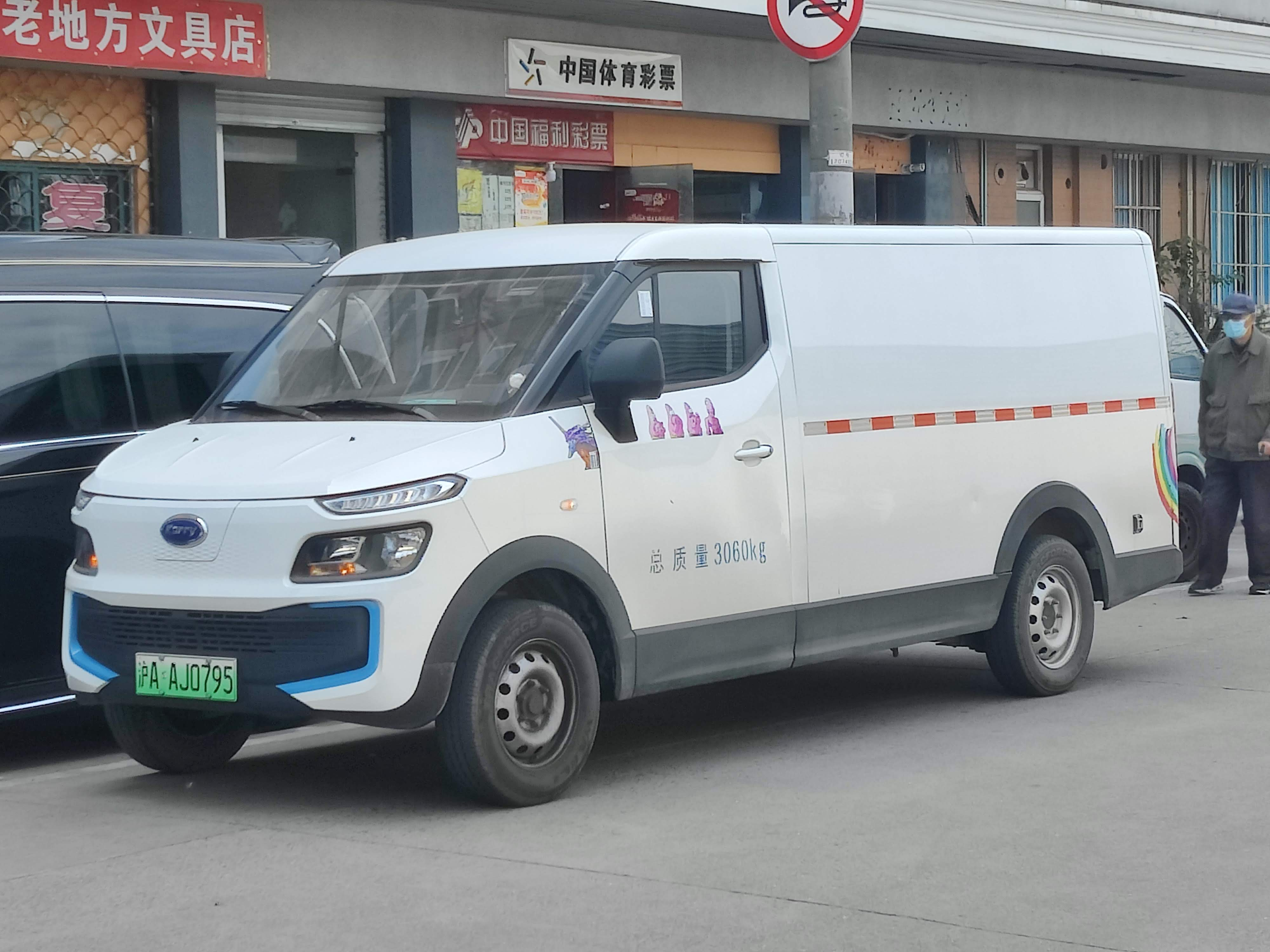
Karry Dolphin

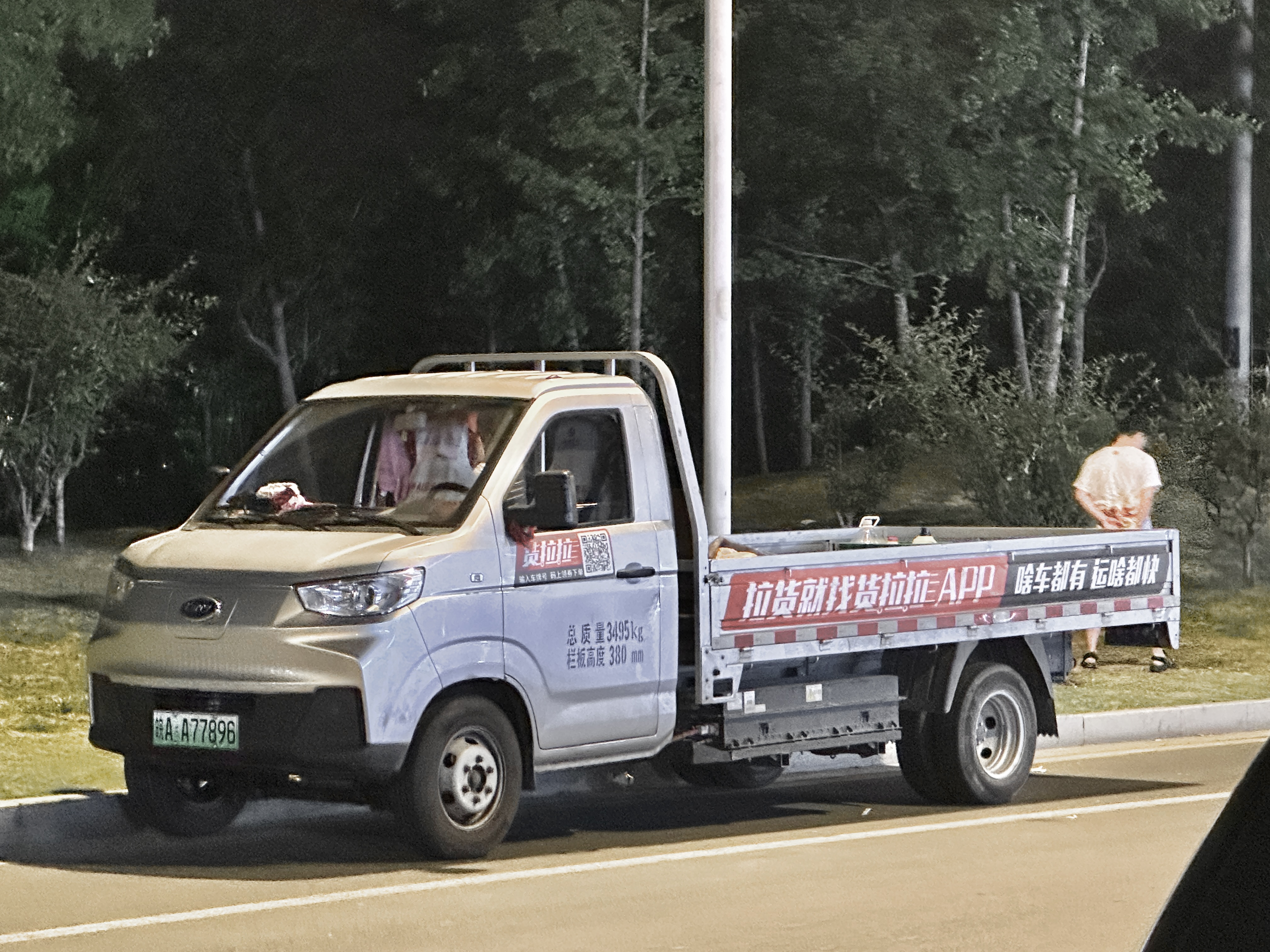
Karry Little Elephant EV

=== C&C Trucks ===
C&C Trucks (联合重卡) is a joint venture by Chery Holding and CIMC that focuses on producing heavy duty trucks. It was first established on 12 March 2009, with the first trucks unveiled during the 2010 Beijing Auto Show in April 2010. In May 2013, C&C Trucks made the first batch of export products. The current line up of tractor head models of C&C Trucks were launched in 2023, and the models include the Kylin series, the Optimus, and the C9. The C&C Trucks Phoenix series was unveiled in May 2025 featuring a shared visual design identity with the Karry branded light commercial vehicles.

=== Chery Wanda Buses ===
Chery & Wanda Buses is the division for buses, coaches, and commercial vans of the Chery Holding. The company was established jointly with Guizhou Wanda Bus Co., Ltd with the bus production base commenced in Xiaomeng Industrial Park in the Guiyang Economic Development Zone in 2011. In 2012 it was renamed to Chery & Wanda Guizhou Bus Co., Ltd. As of November 2023, it continues to be in charge of the production and sales of multiple models such as the Rely H5 for export markets.

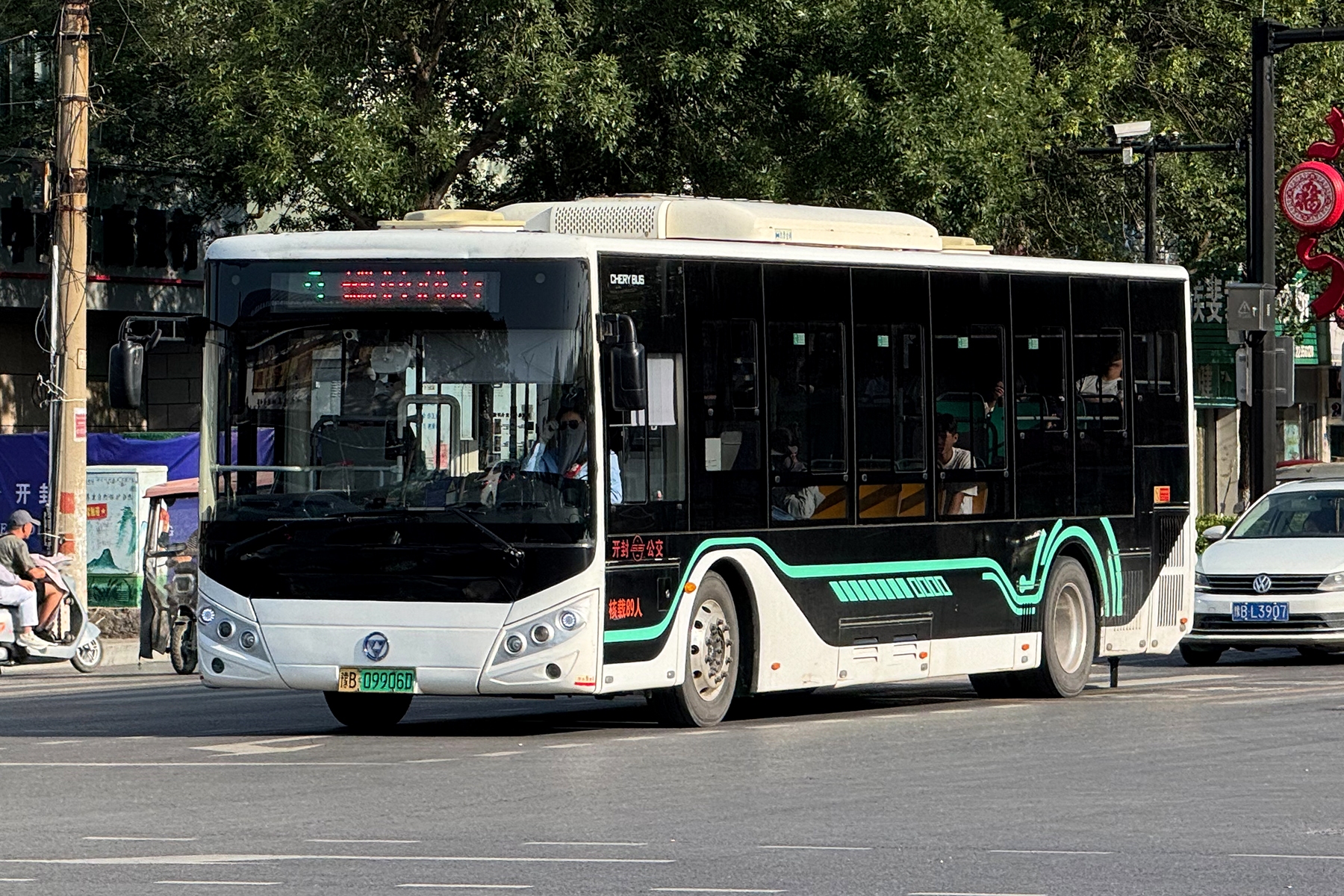
Chery Wanda WD6105BEVG15 bus

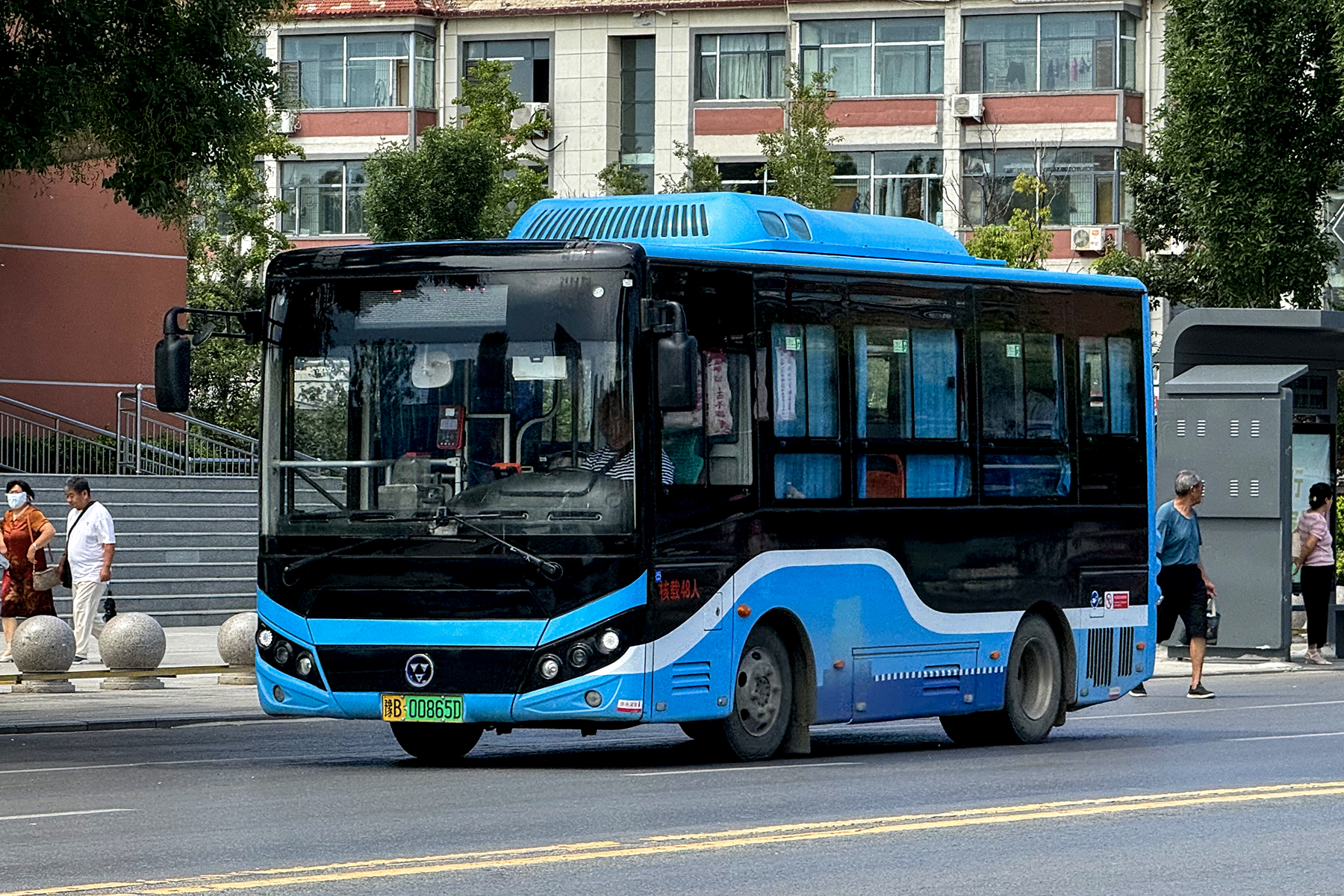
Chery Wanda WD6666BEVG03 bus

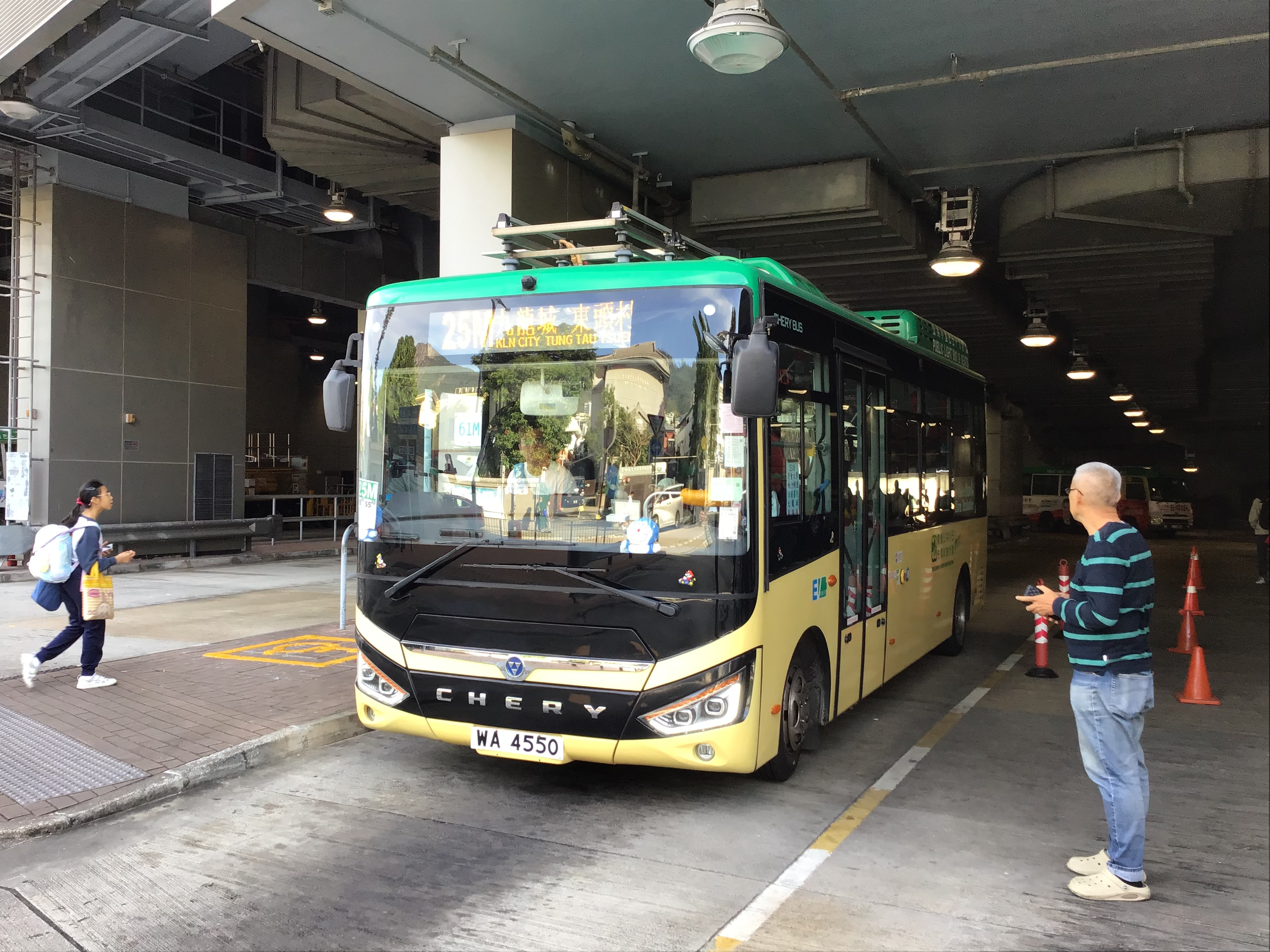
Chery Wanda WD6757BEVRG01 bus

=== Chevoo ===
Chevoo (骐蔚, Qiwei) is marque of Guizhou Ruiqi New Energy Automobile, a joint venture founded in 2021 between Chery Wanda Buses and government of Guizhou at ratio of 49:51. Focusing on new energy commercial vehicles, the Chevoo products are mainly rebadged Karry models and electric heavy trucks. With the Changjiang No. 5 and Changjiang No. 6 being rebadged variants of the Karry Little Elephant EV, the Changjiang No. 7 being a rebadged Karry Porpoise, and Changjiang No. 9 being a rebadged Karry Lingmi (零米).

== Overseas markets ==
Chery export sales figures
| Year | Export sales |
|---|---|
| 2014 | 108,238 |
| 2015 | 86,715 |
| 2016 | 88,081 |
| 2017 | 107,727 |
| 2018 | 126,993 |
| 2019 | 96,047 |
| 2020 | 113,762 |
| 2021 | 269,154 |
| 2022 | 451,337 |
| 2023 | 937,148 |
| 2024 | 1,144,588 |

Chery has been the largest Chinese automobile exporter. The company started its export operations well ahead of other Chinese manufacturers, making its first export to the Middle East as early as 2001. It became China's largest car exporter since 2003, except in 2022 when SAIC Motor briefly took the position. As of 2024, Chery has been exporting cars to more than 80 countries and regions, with a total export volume of more than 1.7 million vehicles. Russia, South America and the Middle East are its key export markets.

Chery's export business started in October 2001 when a car dealership owner from Syria spotted a Chery car on the streets of Beijing, catching his interest. Following numerous inquiries, he learned that this car was the recently released first-generation Fengyun/Fulwin sedan. The dealer promptly visited Chery's headquarters in Anhui, aiming to meet current chairman Yin Tongyue, at that time an executive deputy general manager to discuss potential export collaboration. Eventually, Yin agreed to export 10 cars as a trial, which marks the beginning of Chery's venture into overseas markets. Subsequently, Chery started exporting cars in larger volumes to other regions. Prior to 2012, unlike most larger Chinese carmakers, Chery lacked a joint venture with any foreign manufacturer. A 2009 report by the US Congressional Research Service asserted that such joint ventures usually restrained overseas sales.

In the following two decades, Chery's annual export sales remained at around 100,000 to 150,000 vehicles until a surge occurred in the early 2020s. From 2020 to 2023, Chery's export business experienced rapid growth, doubling to 937,100 vehicles in 2023 compared to the previous year, constituting 52 percent of its total sales. That year, Chery ranked first in export volume among Chinese automobile manufacturers, surpassing SAIC Motor's passenger cars division which held the position in 2022. Its overseas ventures were reported to be more lucrative than its domestic operations due to the larger margin per vehicle, with a significant portion of its over 30 billion yuan profit in 2022 coming from international markets.

Chery claims to be the first Chinese manufacturer to export complete vehicles, CKD components, engines, and complete vehicle manufacturing technology and equipment abroad. As of 2024, Chery has 10 production bases overseas which produce either complete or semi-complete knock-down kits, mainly in South America, the Middle East and Russia; they have also been expanding to Southeast Asia and Europe.

=== Americas ===
==== Brazil ====
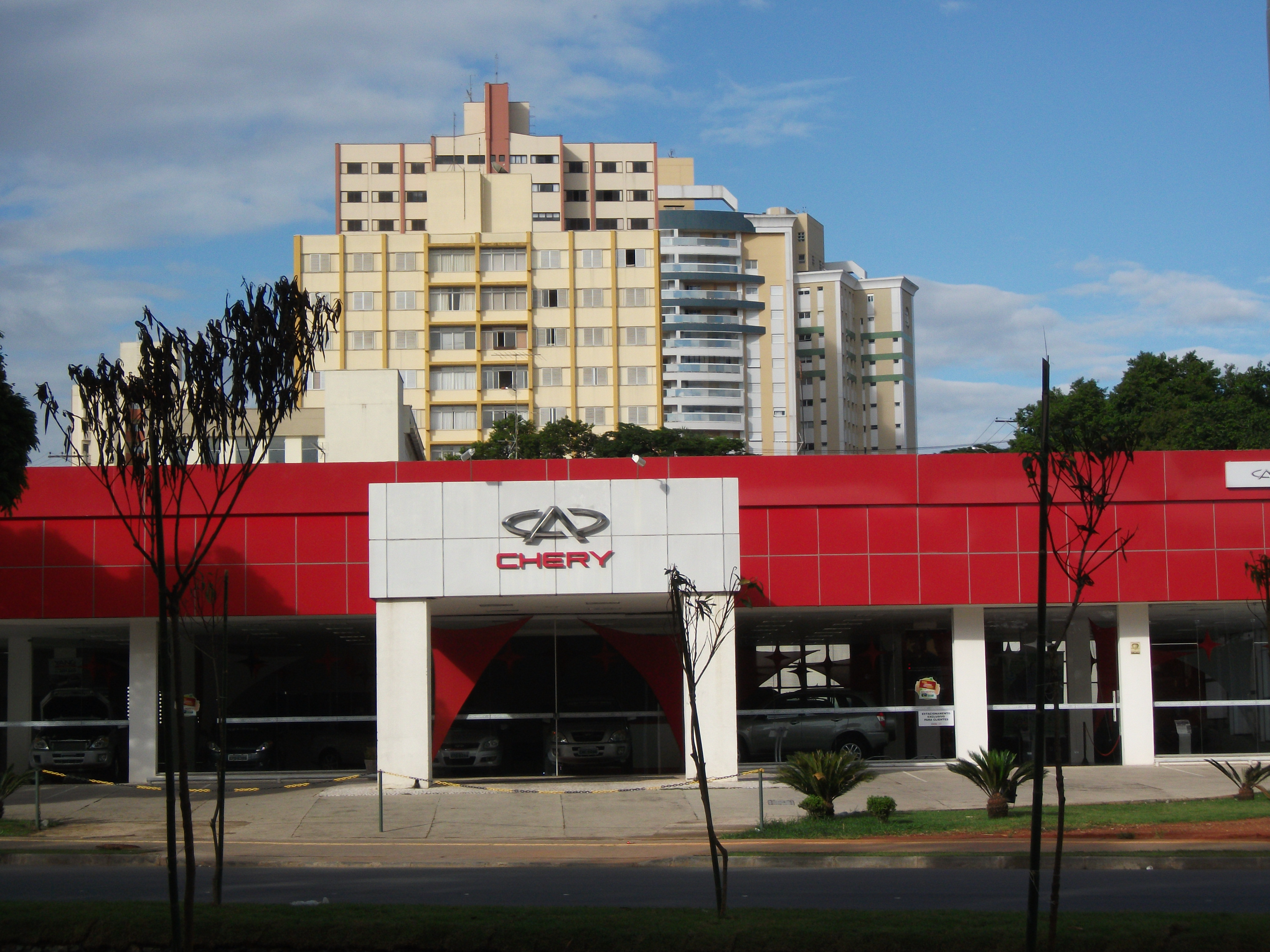
A Chery dealership in São Paulo, Brazil, 2011

Chery has a production base in Jacareí, Brazil, that began construction in July 2011, in a joint effort with the government of the state of São Paulo. The plant began operating in August 2014, with a first-phase production capacity of 50,000 units per year. In phase two, the plant would achieve an annual production capacity of 150,000 units. Models produced there were the hybrid-powered Celer (since October 2014), the QQ (since the second half of 2015), Tiggo 2 (since mid-2017) and Arrizo 5 (since October 2018).

In 2017, the Brazilian automobile manufacturer Grupo Caoa bought 51 % of Chery's operation in Brazil. Since then, the vehicles in Brazil have been offered under the Caoa Chery brand. Caoa has been producing the Tiggo 4 in Anápolis, Goiás in knock-down kit form since November 2018. Between 2018 and 2023, the plant had produced the Arrizo 5, Arrizo 6, Tiggo 2, Tiggo 3x, Tiggo 5x, Tiggo 7 and Tiggo 8, totaling around 146,921 vehicles. In August 2023, Caoa announced a R$3 billion investment in the Anápolis facility to expand and modernize the plant. It resulted in the opening of a second production shift in January 2024, which created 1,357 new jobs in total.

In 2024, Chery will enter the Brazilian market independently without Caoa by using three brands: Omoda, Jaecoo, and Exeed. The company also plans to reactivate the Jacareí plant to produce cars from the three brands; the plant is currently owned by Caoa Chery and has sat dormant since February 2022.

==== Mexico ====
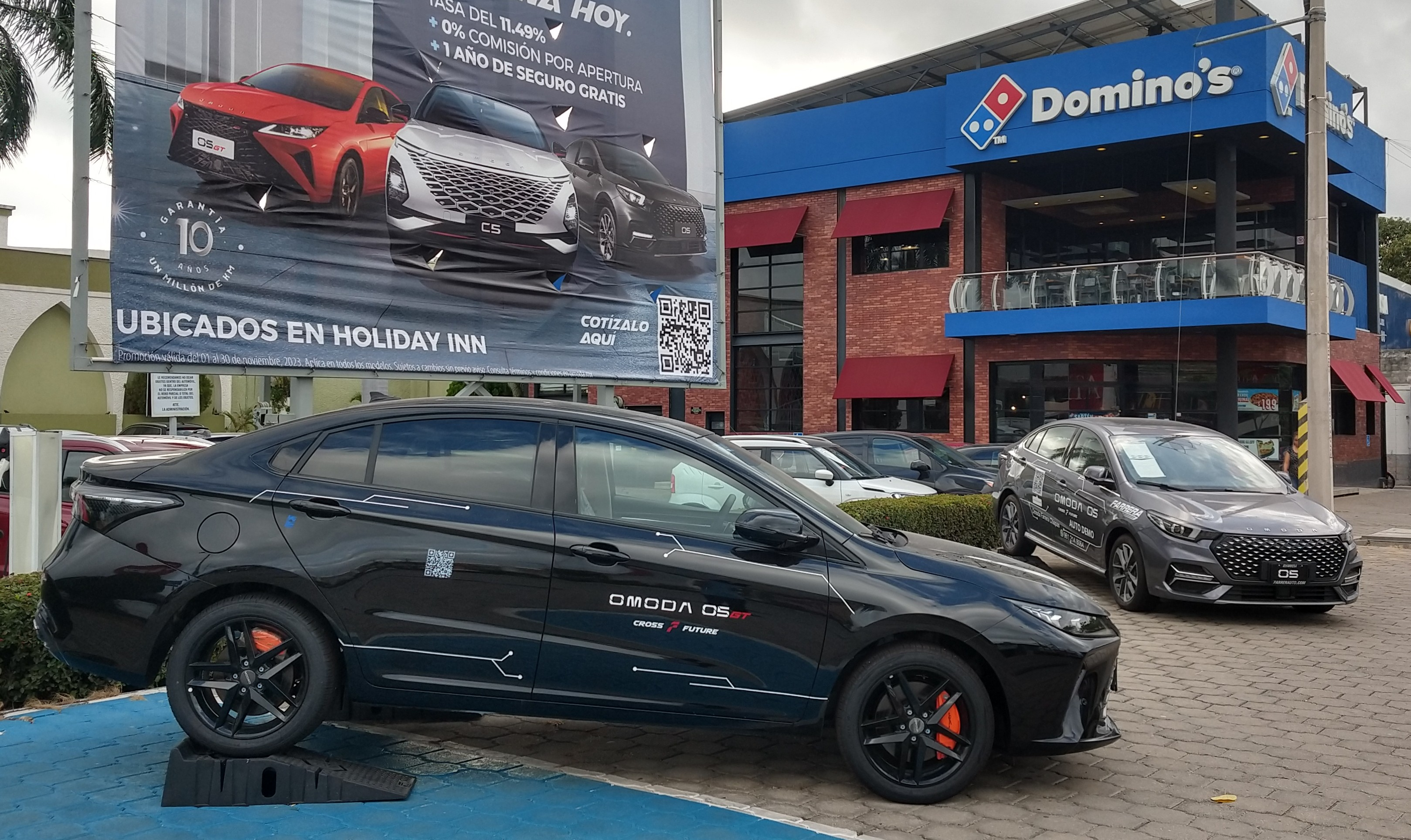
Omoda cars in a dealership in Mexico

In 2022, Chery entered the Mexican market as Chirey. An alternate form of the name was chosen due to American businessman Malcolm Bricklin owning the Chery trademark in North America; he had planned to import Chery vehicles to the US and Canada in the 2000s.

In May 2023, Chery introduced Omoda as its second brand in the country. The Chirey Omoda 5 was renamed the Omoda C5. Omoda will open 70 dealers across the country that will be shared with the upcoming Jaecoo brand.

==== Uruguay ====
Between 2007 and 2015, the Argentinian company SOCMA Group manufactured Chery vehicles in the Oferol factory in Barra de Carrasco, Canelones, Uruguay. The Tiggo was officially launched in Uruguay in October 2007. The plant was permanently closed as of May 2015.

==== Venezuela ====
First introduced to the country in mid-2006, Chery vehicles continued to be the only licensed Chinese car exports to Venezuela as of 2011, according to the company. Opened in September 2011, a new Chery production site in the north-central state of Aragua, owned by the ZGT joint venture, produces the A1 and A3 models.

==== Peru ====
Chery entered Peru in 2008, where its partner is SKBergé. In the first half of 2026 it ranked tenth among all brands, with sales up 111.9 per cent year on year. In March 2026 it was named Best Chinese Brand (Mejor Marca China) at the third edition of the Best Car of the Year Perú, a public-vote award organised by the Peruvian motoring outlet Nitro Digital.

==== Colombia ====
Chery returned to the Colombian market in 2024 through the Grupo Vardí. A report published in December 2025 put cumulative sales between the brand's August 2024 entry and that date above 2,000 vehicles; in November 2025 it sold 351 units, up 401 per cent year on year, placing twelfth nationally.

==== Ecuador ====
In the first seven months of 2024, Chery was Ecuador's best-selling Chinese brand and ranked fifth in the overall market, according to the Ecuadorian automotive association AEADE. In the first seven months of 2026 it ranked second in Ecuador's hybrid segment.

==== Argentina ====
Chery was the first Chinese car brand to enter Argentina, initially brought in by the SOCMA Group. Reporting in September 2025 said Chery had relaunched operations in the country under a new official importer, Grupo Corven, replacing Grupo Socma after 17 years, and had opened reservations for two hybrid SUVs, the Tiggo 4 Hybrid and the Tiggo 7 Pro Hybrid. In May 2026 the Tiggo 4 was named the safest compact SUV in Argentina at the 19th edition of CESVI Argentina's Crash Test awards, which assess models launched during 2025 against a 225-item safety index weighted by December 2025 prices.

=== Asia-Pacific ===
==== Australia ====
Chery vehicles first entered Australia in 2011, brought in by Australian distributor Ateco. Several models were introduced, including the J1, J3 hatchback and J11 SUV. The J1 became the cheapest car on sale in the country during its introduction at A$9,990. In August 2012, Ateco recalled 2,250 Chery vehicles after the cars' engines and exhaust gaskets were found to contain asbestos. Ateco ended sales of Chery vehicles in 2015, citing Chery's shifting focus to its home market and communication difficulties with the headquarters.

The brand re-entered Australia in 2023 under a subsidiary owned directly by Chery. It purchased the "Gemini" trademark from Holden / General Motors in 2022, although the trademark remains unused. The first model it introduced is the Chery Omoda 5, which started deliveries in March 2023. That year, the brand sold 5,890 vehicles in the market.

==== Indonesia ====
Chery models were assembled from knock-down kits and sold in Indonesia since 2006 until 2011 by Indomobil Group. Indomobil ended sales of Chery in 2011 due to low sales and recurring quality issues. In 2022, the brand returned to Indonesia under direct factory-backed operations, and contracted PT Handal Motor Indonesia to assemble Chery vehicles in the country as of late 2022. Chery started exporting vehicles from Indonesia to Vietnam since 2024.The battery-electric Chery Q was launched in Indonesia on 31 July 2026 at the Gaikindo Indonesia International Auto Show (GIIAS). At the show's Exhibitor Night, the model received the Favourite Passenger Car award in the hatchback category.

==== Iran ====
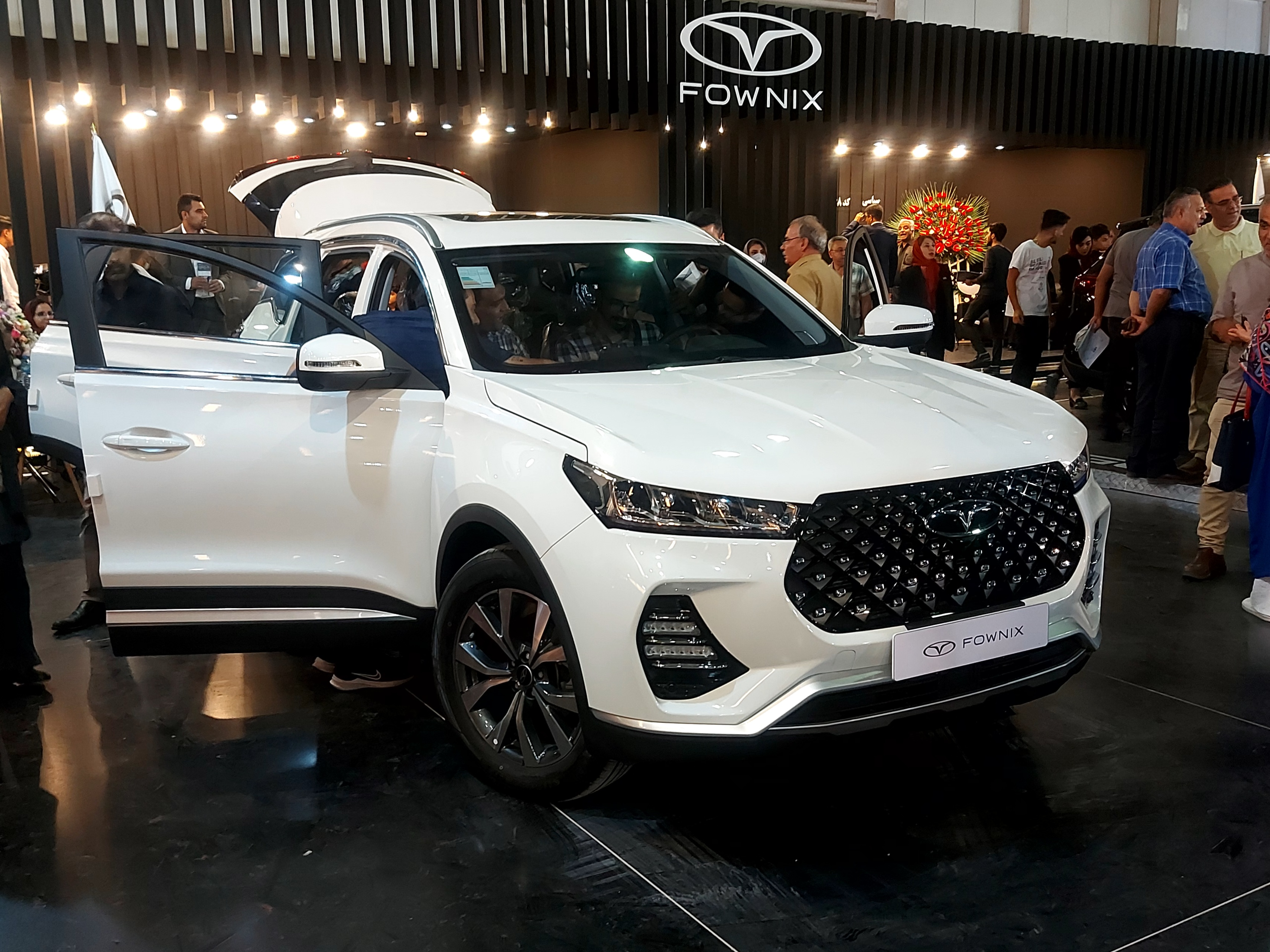
The Fownix Tiggo 7 Pro, assembled by Modiran Vehicle Manufacturing Company

In 2003, Chery signed CKD (completely knock down) agreements with Iran's SKT Company and Modiran Vehicle Manufacturing Company, which involved a factory construction to assemble vehicles in the form of complete parts, which has lower tariffs than directly importing complete vehicles. Manufacture from kits in Iran began in 2004. In late 2007, Chery stated that it held a minority ownership in a joint venture with Iran Khodro and Canadian Solitac as its partners. This joint venture controlled a knock-down factory in Babol, Mazandaran.

==== Malaysia ====
In 2006, local manufacturer Proton considered producing an MPV and an SUV model together with Chery in Malaysia, which are reported as the Chery V5 and Chery Tiggo, respectively.

By 2008, a factory assembling Chery models from kits opened in Johor Bahru, Johor through a 50–50 joint venture between local company Alado Corp Sdn Bhd and Chery. Its first model was the Chery Eastar MPV, originally the V5 in China. In 2012, Chery planned another factory that was expected to be built and operational in Malaysia by 2015.

In 2023, the brand returned to Malaysia under direct factory-backed operations, and assembled vehicles at Inokom's facility in Kulim, Kedah since August 2023. In 2024, Chery Malaysia announced that it will build a fully owned plant in Shah Alam to complement production at Kulim, which would produce Jaecoo vehicles. The first vehicle produced by the facility, a Jaecoo J7, rolled off the plant in June 2024.

==== Pakistan ====
Chery has entered into a manufacturing and licensing agreement with Ghandhara Nissan of Pakistan. The assembly of Chery SUVs in Pakistan commenced on 31 March 2022.

==== Taiwan ====
The Chery A3 was assembled since August 2009 in Taichung, Taiwan, by Shengrong Auto, a subsidiary of Prince Motors (Chinese: 太子汽車; pinyin: Tàizǐ Qìchē), a Taiwanese car company.

==== Thailand ====
Chery announced its official debut in Thailand on 16 August 2025, opening pre-bookings for two models, the battery-electric V23 and the plug-in hybrid Tiggo 8 CSH. At the 2025 Thailand Motor Expo, Chery ranked first in the Motor Exhibition Sales Satisfaction Index (MSSI) compiled by the market research firm Differential, with 936 points out of a possible 1,000, based on 1,523 interviews conducted with buyers at the event.

=== Central Asia ===
==== Kazakhstan ====
According to figures from the Kazakhstan Automobile Union, Chery was the fourth best-selling brand in Kazakhstan in 2025 with 14,570 vehicles sold, in a market that grew 14.4 per cent to 234,852 units. The Tiggo 2 entered production at a new plant in Almaty that year and was the country's ninth best-selling model, with 5,278 units.

==== Uzbekistan ====
On 28 June 2022 Chery sent its first vehicles to Uzbekistan, comprising the Tiggo 8 Pro Max, the Tiggo 7 Pro and the Arrizo 6, with sales due to begin in the third quarter of that year and the first dealerships to open in Tashkent. According to figures from UzAutoSanoat, Chery was the fourth best-selling brand in the country in 2025 with 11,313 vehicles sold. Production of Chery vehicles at the ADM Jizzakh plant in Jizzakh province rose from 7,072 units to 9,354, an increase of 32 per cent.

=== Middle East ===
==== Israel ====
Chery went on sale in Israel in November 2022, imported by Freesbe. In 2025 it ranked third among car brands in the country, with sales up 111.3 per cent on the previous year, and led the monthly rankings in July, August, September and December, when it recorded a share of 17.4 per cent. More than 25,000 Chery vehicles were registered in the country over the year. The Tiggo 8 Pro roughly doubled its sales to become the fourth best-selling model in the country that year.

==== Kuwait ====
Chery is sold in Kuwait through Alghanim Motors. The brand recorded 2,916 sales in the country in 2024, placing it fourteenth in the brand ranking, according to figures based on vehicle registrations with the Ministry of Interior.

==== Qatar ====
Chery entered Qatar in November 2019, when its exclusive distributor Elite Motors presented the brand in Doha with six models: the Arrizo 3, the Arrizo 5, the Arrizo 6, the E5, the Tiggo 7 and the Tiggo 8. At the 2024 Arab Car of the Year ceremony, organised by Maqina Middle East and held in Doha, the Tiggo 7 Pro Max received the Best Selling SUV award.

==== United Arab Emirates ====
Chery is distributed in the United Arab Emirates by AW Rostamani, which announced an exclusive national distribution partnership with the brand in October 2023, with the Tiggo 7 Pro Max, the Tiggo 8 Pro Max and the Tiggo 8 Pro plug-in hybrid to be introduced to the market as part of the line-up.

=== Europe ===
==== Italy ====
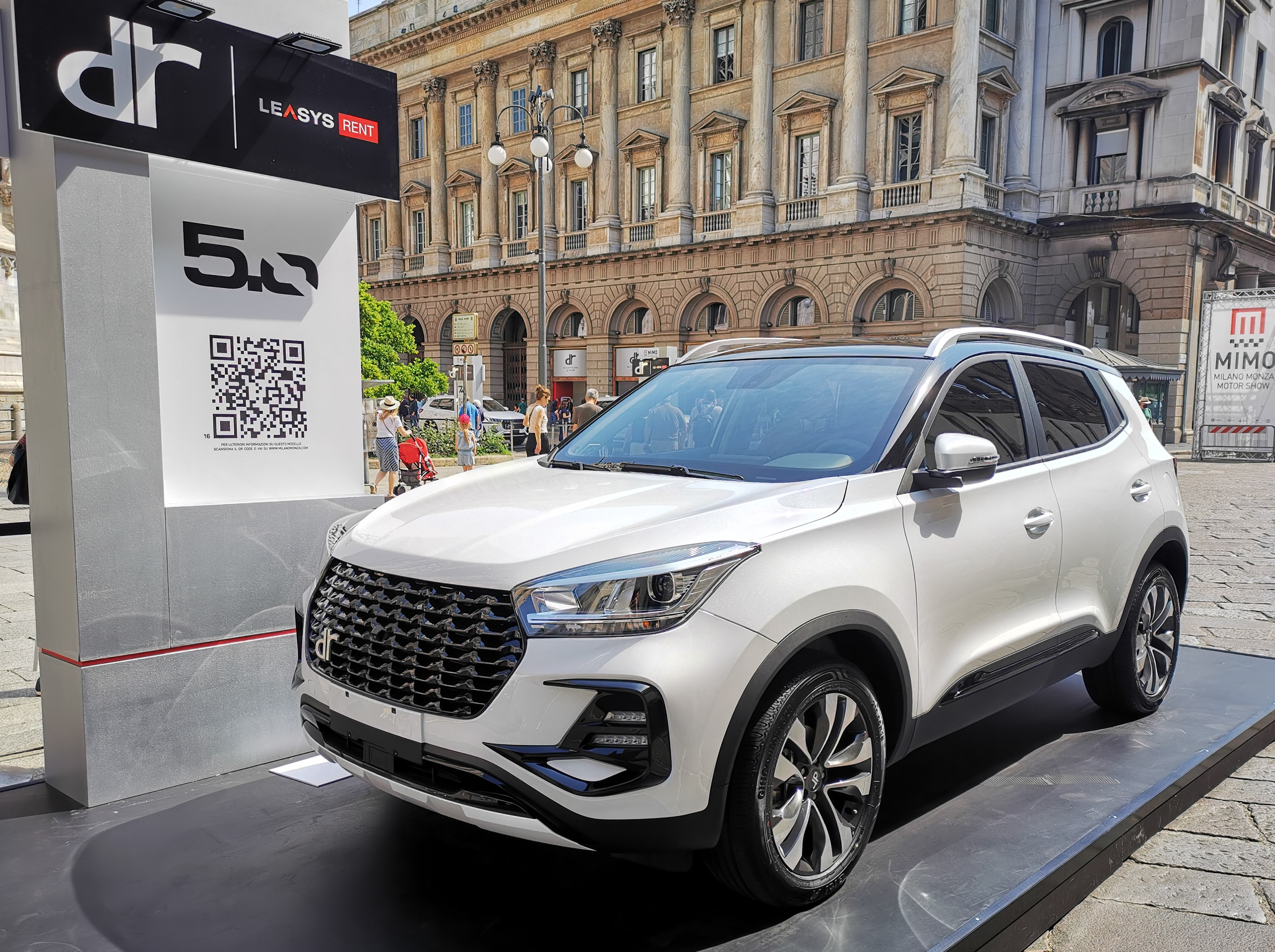
2022 DR 5.0, a rebadged Chery Tiggo 5x in Italy

Since November 2007, Chery partners with fxDR Motor, a subsidiary of DR Automobiles Group to assemble and distribute Chery vehicles in Italy under the DR brand. According to a Chery representative, the company chose not to enter the European market directly at that time since the European Union is a "sensitive" market and it "shall only consider entering the region when all conditions permit". Some Chery vehicles are assembled at a facility in Macchia d'Isernia to be sold as DR Automobiles vehicles. The original Chery Tiggo was marketed as the DR5, while the Riich M1 became the DR1. Later DR Automobiles added models developed by JAC and BAIC. In 2022, DR Automobiles added a more "premium" brand called Sportequipe, which are also rebranded Chery vehicles. In February 2023, DR Automobiles started selling its first electric vehicle, the DR 1.0, a rebranded Chery eQ1.

Chery will enter Italy directly and separately from DR Automobiles by selling two brands, Omoda and Jaecoo, by the third quarter of 2024.

==== Spain ====
Chery first entered the Spanish market in March 2024, introducing the Omoda 5 and Omoda E5 under the Omoda brand.

In April 2024, Chery signed a joint venture deal with Spanish company EV Motors to build cars in a former Nissan factory in Barcelona, Spain. Nissan ended production in the plant in 2021, before handing the facility over to Spanish electric motorcycle maker Silence and local engineering groups QEV and EV Motors. Chery will start producing its Omoda vehicles at the plant first, while EV Motors will produce its own vehicles starting in the fourth quarter of 2024.

==== Rest of Western Europe ====
Chery plans to launch three brands in core European markets by 2026, with each brand launching three new models. Two brands, Omoda and Jaecoo, will be launched first in 2024, while the luxury brand Exlantix (a sub-brand of Exeed) will be launched in 2025.

==== Russia ====
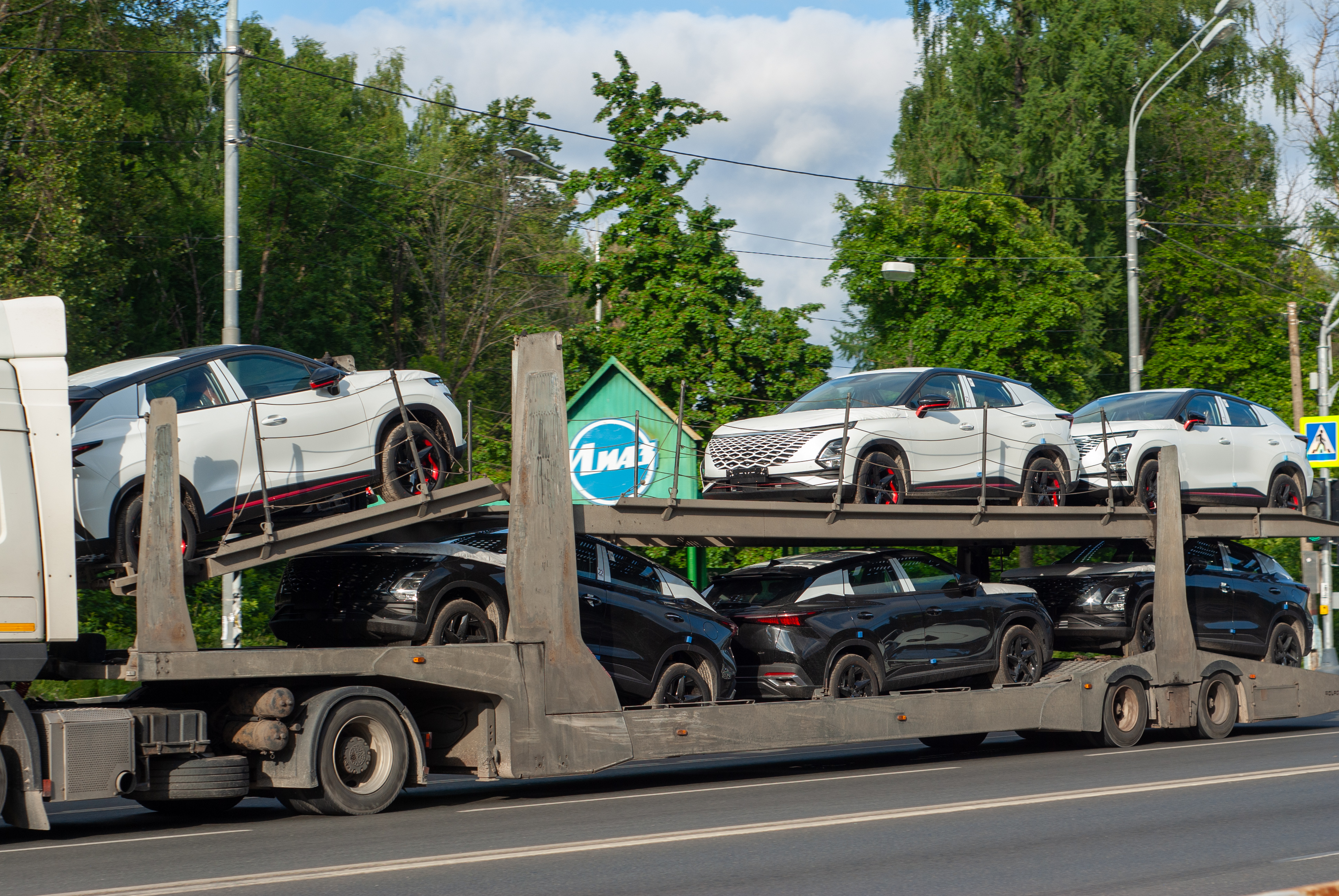
Omoda C5 vehicles in transit in Moscow, Russia

Chery entered the Russian market in 2005. Avtotor produced Chery models from kits from 2006 to 2008. TagAZ also produced Chery vehicles, from 2008 to 2014, but they usually carried non-Chery badges such as "Vortex". In 2020, Chery started selling Exeed vehicles in Russia.

As a result of Western, South Korean and Japanese manufacturers leaving Russia due to the Russian invasion of Ukraine in 2022, Chery reported massive sales growth in Russia. In 2023, Chery was second only to the local Russian brand Lada with annual sales of 119,000 vehicles with a local market share of 11.2 percent, accounting for 20 percent of Chery's overseas sales.

In 2024, local manufacturer AvtoVAZ will produce the Chery Tiggo 7 Pro Max at a former Nissan assembly plant, now rebranded as the Xcite X-Cross 7. Despite local production, the Chery Tiggo 7 Pro Max will still be available in the Russian market as Chinese imports sold through Chery dealerships.

==== Turkey ====
In October 2009, Chery announced plans for an assembly plant in Turkey to be built in cooperation with the Turkish carmaker Mermerler Otomotiv at a cost of $500 million. The plant is planned to have an initial capacity of 20,000 units per year, rising to 100,000 by 2017. As of 2012, the plant has yet to commence production.

Chery re-entered Turkey in late 2022 under its own direct investment, and started sales in March 2023 with three models, the Omoda 5, Tiggo 7 Pro and Tiggo 8 Pro. In its first year of sales, Chery was able to sell 40,590 vehicles in the country, ahead of many established brands.

In March 2025, the Turkish government announced that Chery's partners will make a US$1 billion investment in Samsun, Turkey for a manufacturing plant with a capacity to create 5,000 jobs and produce 200,000 vehicles a year. The project also includes a research and development.

==== Ukraine ====
Chery had a partnership with ZAZ since 2006 and manufactured cars from kits at sites in Zaporizhzhia and Chornomorsk. Since February 2011, the Chery A13 has been manufactured in Ukraine, where it is rebadged and sold in the country as a ZAZ Forza.

==== United Kingdom ====
Chery launched Omoda in the United Kingdom in May 2024 with the Omoda 5 and Omoda E5. It shares its dealer network with Jaecoo, which was later launched in February 2025 with the Jaecoo 7. That year, Chery launched its eponymous brand in August. Chery's UK director, Victor Zhang, has said the company is considering opening a UK factory.

In January 2026, Chery announced plans to open a research and development facility in Liverpool that will serve as the European headquarters for its commercial vehicle arm, after reports emerged that Jaguar Land Rover could assemble Chery vehicles in its UK factories. In June, an agreement was reached allowing Nissan to assemble Chery models in its plant in Sunderland by 2027. On 19 August 2026, Chery announced it would open an R&D facility at the UTAC Millbrook site in Bedfordshire, to be opened in autumn.

==== Poland ====
Chery launched its eponymous brand in Poland in June 2025, making the country the brand's first market in Europe, and sales of the Tiggo 7 and Tiggo 8 began on 1 July. On 30 June 2025 the company held its first official brand, product and CSH technology launch event in Warsaw, where the Tiggo 7, the Tiggo 8, the Tiggo 7 CSH and the Tiggo 8 CSH were presented. According to the Polish motoring portal Autoflesz, the Tiggo 7 plug-in hybrid (CSH) won the plug-in hybrid class at the fourth Rajd Test Autostradowy, an efficiency rally for electric and plug-in hybrid cars, with a remaining range of 529 km recorded at the finish of a route of more than 430 km.

==== Greece ====
Chery entered the Greek market in July 2025 through the Spanos Group, initially with the Tiggo 7 and the Tiggo 8 equipped with the company's CSH plug-in hybrid system, to which the Tiggo 4 was added in September. In November 2025 the Tiggo 4 was named among the eleven finalists for the 2026 Car of the Year for Greece award, selected from more than 50 new models launched in the country in the preceding twelve months by a 27-member jury of Greek motoring journalists. In February 2026 it was named Car of the Year 2026 in a separate award organised by the Greek motoring media outlets NewsAuto, CAR and Protothema. It recorded 1,027 registrations in Greece in 2025, the third-highest figure among Chinese manufacturers in the country, and according to data from the Hellenic Statistical Authority it ranked eighth in new passenger-car registrations in December that year with a 3.7 per cent share.

==== Hungary ====
In 2025 Chery signed an agreement with Grand Automotive for the representation of the Chery brand in Hungary. On 26 August 2025 the importer, Grand Automotive East, presented the first Chery models in Hungary to its partners: two SUVs offered with petrol and plug-in hybrid (CSH) powertrains. Grand Automotive started operations in Hungary in 2019 as a member of Israel's Taavura group and, together with an affiliated company, is responsible for the import activities of five car brands in 13 countries. According to vehicle registration data compiled by Datahouse, Chery registered 2,415 new passenger cars in Hungary in the first eight months of 2026, a 2.5 per cent share and the fourteenth-highest figure among brands. In May 2026, at the Hungarian Car of the Year 2026 awards organised by Autós Nagykoalíció, Zöldjárműipar.hu and Járműipar.hu, the Tiggo 7 plug-in hybrid (CSH) was one of five models to receive a jury-favourite certificate.

==== Romania ====
Chery entered Romania in 2025 through the Auto Italia Group, part of the Samelet Group, which was appointed to import and distribute the brand. The first batch of vehicles was shipped from Wuhu on 4 June 2025, comprising the Tiggo 7 and the Tiggo 8 in petrol and plug-in hybrid (CSH) form, and sales began in July; the importer's local line-up included the Tiggo 7 in petrol and CSH form, the Tiggo 4 HEV and the Tiggo 9 CSH. According to the Association of Automobile Manufacturers and Importers (APIA), in the first seven months of 2026 Chery ranked second among brands in Romania's plug-in hybrid segment with 1,097 units, and the Tiggo 9 was the third best-selling plug-in hybrid model with 485 units. At the eighth Gala Premiilor AUTOpro, held by the Romanian motoring publication AUTOpro on 5 March 2026, the Tiggo 4 received the publication's Best Value Car award.

==== Austria ====
Chery began sales in Austria in June 2026, with distribution handled by Freesbe GmbH in Vienna, part of the Carasso Motors group, which also imports the brand in Israel. The launch line-up comprised four SUVs, the Tiggo 4, the Tiggo 7, the Tiggo 8 and the Tiggo 9, with the Tiggo 7 offered with petrol, hybrid and plug-in hybrid (CSH) powertrains. Reporting dated 9 October 2026 stated that 882 Chery vehicles had been put on Austrian roads between the June 2026 launch and that date, including 268 in September, and that the brand had 19 dealerships.

=== Africa ===
==== Egypt ====
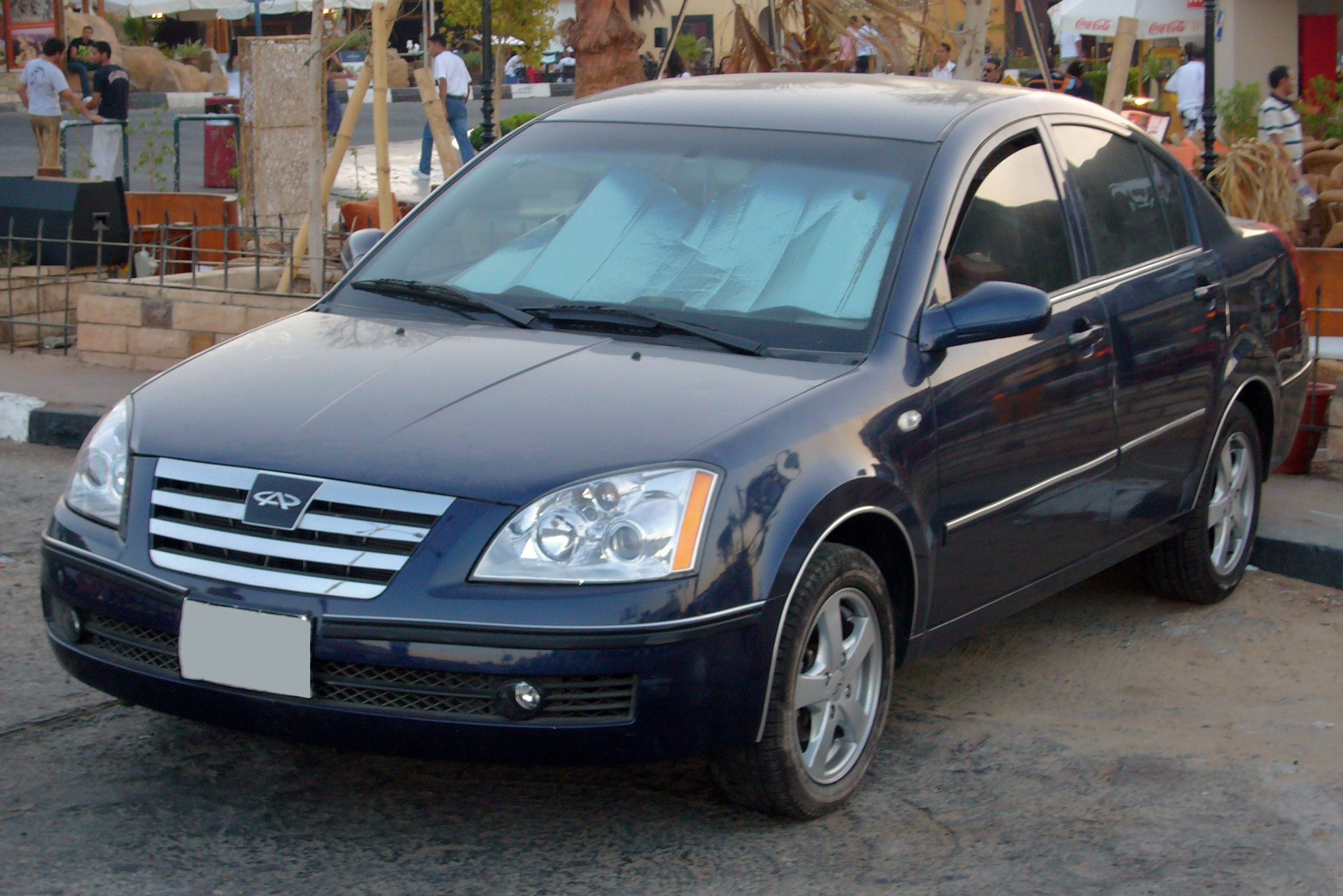
Speranza Chery A5 in Sharm el-Sheik, Egypt

Assembly of Chery cars from complete knock-down kits began in Egypt in 2004 according to the company itself, but news reports indicate that it only expressed initial interest in doing so that year. As of 2011, some Chery models were sold in the country under the brand name Speranza. One Egyptian factory making Chery models from semi-complete knock-down kits had a 2009 production capacity of 30,000 vehicles/year.

In 2011, Chery stated the parts localization ratio for Egypt was 45%.

==== South Africa ====
Chery started sales in South Africa in 2008, backed by local financial services company, Bidvest, and local car dealership company, Imperial. Several vehicles that was introduced include the QQ, QQ3, the J2 and J3 hatchbacks, and Tiggo TX.

Chery left the South African market in 2018, and re-entered in 2021, when it founded local subsidiary Chery South Africa. By 2023, it was the sixth best-selling brand in the country.

In April 2023, Chery introduced its Omoda brand in South Africa as a more "premium" offering. The Jaecoo brand was added in 2024.

In 2025, Chery announced that it would introduce 19 new energy vehicles (NEVs) in South Africa, throughout the year, as part of further expansion in the country. The first of these vehicles was unveiled at Auto Shanghai 2025. Jay Jay Botes, General Manager for Chery South Africa, stated that Chery believes that its Super Hybrid technology will become a key growth driver in markets like South Africa.

In July 2025, Chery South Africa announced that it had reached a sales volume that justified exploring the viability of establishing a manufacturing plant in the country. Chery confirmed it was in the second phase of a feasibility study to determine the viability of local manufacturing.

In January 2026, Chery announced plans to acquire Nissan's vehicle manufacturing facility in Rosslyn, South Africa, subject to regulatory approval, which it later received. The transaction included the site's land, buildings and associated assets, including a nearby stamping plant, which had an expected completion date of mid-2026. Under the agreement, the majority of Nissan employees at the facility were offered employment by Chery, while Nissan continued its sales and distribution operations in South Africa. Chery officially opened the Rosslyn plant on 3 July 2026, retaining its 692 existing employees; production is scheduled to begin in mid-2027.

==== Tunisia ====
Chery is distributed in Tunisia by the Société Tunisienne d'Automobiles (STA), its official dealer in the country. Sales data for 2025 put its growth at 70 per cent over the previous year, moving the brand from twelfth place to sixth, with the Tiggo 1X-3X the country's fourth best-selling model. At the Volants d'Or 2023 ceremony organised by TUNISIEAUTO.TN and ADCOM Agency, Chery's Tunisian distributor STA received a special mention for best marketing strategy and an award as sales leader in the seven-seater vehicle segment. In the first four months of 2020 the Tiggo 2 was the best-selling model in the country with a 5.6 per cent share, the first time a Chinese model had led the Tunisian sales charts, while the brand rose from thirteenth place over the whole of 2019 to third with an 8.2 per cent share.

== Motorsport ==
In 2010 and 2011, Chery competed in the Dakar Rally. The four cars participating in the rally included two Rely X5 race SUVs, one X5 lead car and one Rely H5 support vehicle for emergency situations.

In 2024, the Tiggo 8 participated in the Taklimakan Rally on the T2 Production Vehicle class.

In December 2025, Chery announced its plan to enter 24 Hours of Le Mans under its Exeed brand by 2030.

== Etymology ==
Yin Tongyue, a technical director proposed the name Qirui (Chinese: 奇瑞) in 1998, which means 'unexpected and auspicious'. Later, this name was romanized as Chery (initially Cheery during the 1999 brand launch).

Other proposed names include Jiuhua (Chinese: 九华) after the local Mount Jiuhua area, but the name was rejected by the Chinese industrial and commercial department because it was stipulated that trademarks cannot be registered with place names.

== Controversies ==
=== Copying ===
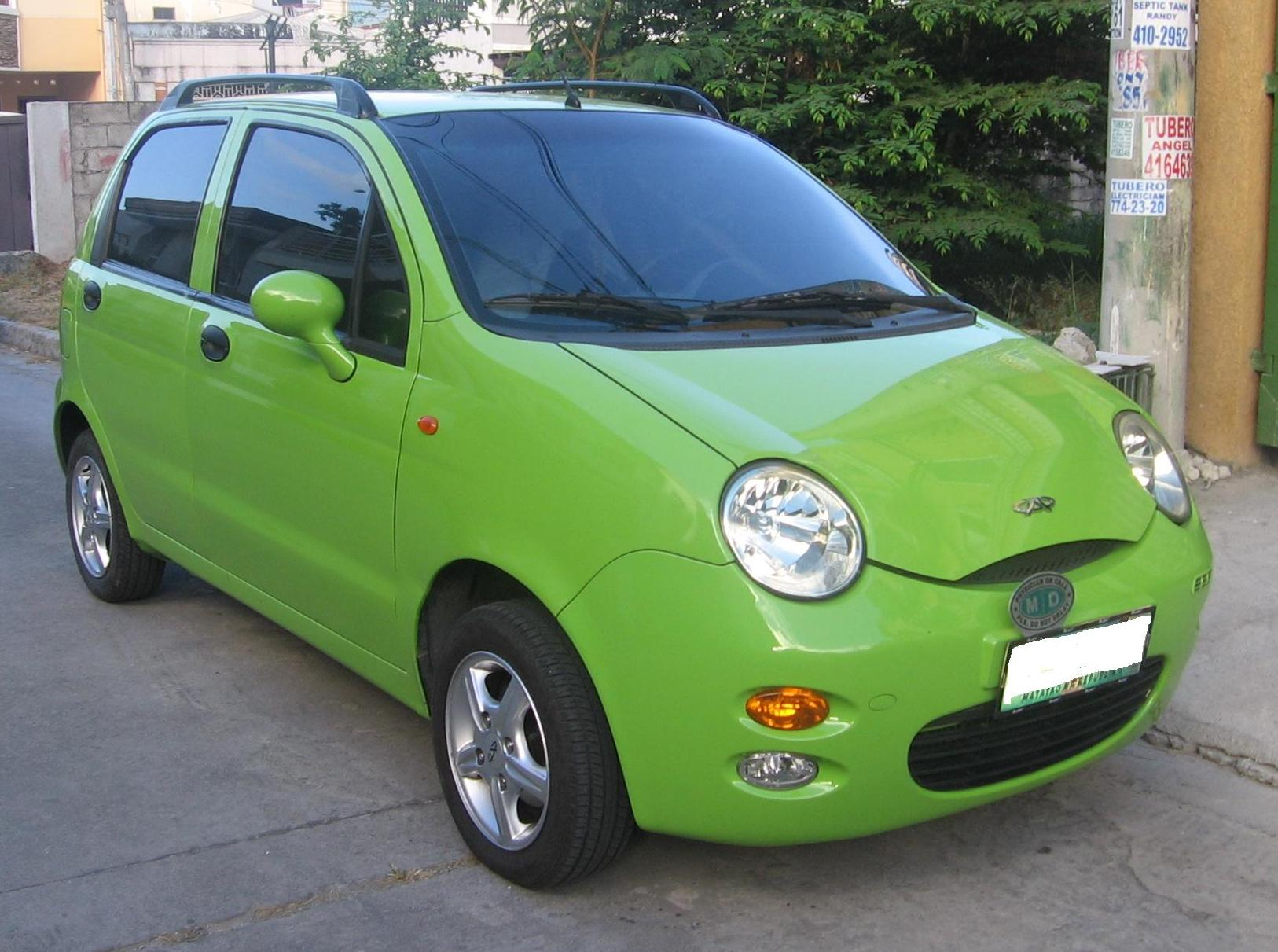
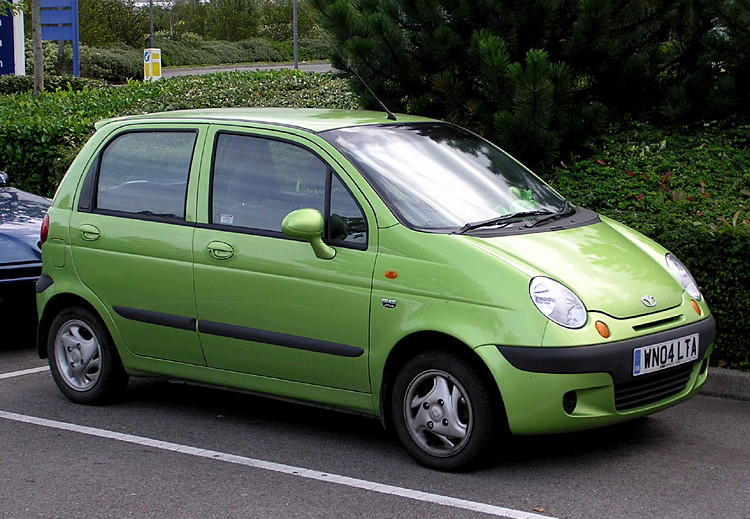
The Chery QQ (left) and Daewoo Matiz (right)

In June 2003, American manufacturer General Motors sued Chery accusing it of copying the first generation Daewoo Matiz (developed by a GM subsidiary, GM Daewoo) in its design for the Chery QQ. General Motors also claimed a disguised Matiz was used in a crash test in place of the Chery car.

GM executives claimed design duplication with many parts interchangeable between the QQ and the Matiz, and GM China Group stated the two vehicles "shared remarkably identical body structure, exterior design, interior design and key components".

The early Chery Tiggo was criticised for resembling the second generation Toyota RAV4. Other models using the Matiz technology found in the QQ include the closely related QQ6. The Eastar and its derivatives (V4, B12, and B22) are allegedly clones of the Daewoo Magnus.

After mediation attempts failed, then-GM Daewoo (now known as GM Korea) brought a case against Chery in a Shanghai court, but by 2005 jurisdiction had been moved to the Beijing No. 1 Intermediate People's Court. Around that time Chinese state officials, including a vice-minister of commerce and a vice-director of the State Intellectual Property Office, publicly supported Chery. The State Intellectual Property Office has claimed that GM did not properly patent their technology. In late 2005 the lawsuit was settled.

=== Quality problems ===
In April 2024, a Chery Omoda 5's rear axle snapped clean off from the car on a smooth, non-bumpy road. 600 or so cars were recalled as it was a safety concern.

In October 2026, the same issue happened to another Chery Omoda 5, with the rear axle being snapped off from the car on a smooth roadway. This time, the Road and Transport Department quickly declared to suspend the Vehicle Type Approval for any future sales of the Omoda 5. Only after the statement by the Road and Transport Department, Chery released their own statement and a recall for 8,878 units.

== Sales ==
Chery sales data by brand
| Year | Total | Chery Automobile | | | | | Chery Holding |
| Year | Total | Chery | Exeed | Jetour | iCar | Luxeed | Commercial vehicles |
|---|---|---|---|---|---|---|---|
| 2010 | 750,456 | 750,456 | - | - | - | - | - |
| 2011 | 729,497 | 729,497 | - | - | - | - | - |
| 2012 | 653,476 | 653,476 | - | - | - | - | - |
| 2013 | 561,062 | 561,062 | - | - | - | - | - |
| 2014 | 570,718 | 570,718 | - | - | - | - | - |
| 2015 | 575,108 | 575,108 | - | - | - | - | - |
| 2016 | 682,474 | 682,474 | - | - | - | - | - |
| 2017 | 604,708 | 604,708 | - | - | - | - | - |
| 2018 | 752,759 | 540,233 | - | 40,007 | - | - | - |
| 2019 | 747,806 | 605,602 | 14,000 | 128,204 | - | - | - |
| 2020 | 731,117 | 586,445 | 18,077 | 126,595 | - | - | - |
| 2021 | 961,926 | 656,943 | 37,167 | 154,035 | - | - | - |
| 2022 | 1,232,727 | 908,553 | 51,142 | 180,067 | - | - | - |
| 2023 | 1,881,316 | 1,341,261 | 125,521 | 315,167 | 1,445 | 899 | - |
| 2024 | 2,603,916 | 1,611,374 | 140,959 | 568,387 | 65,964 | 57,956 | - |
| 2025 | 2,806,393 | 1,700,940 | 120,369 | 622,590 | 96,989 | 90,493 | 175,012 |
Sales data of commercial vehicle business has been excluded since 2025 due to the IPO of Chery Automobile. Chery markets itself as "Chery Group", combining the Chery Automobile and Chery Holding's sales data. In reality "Chery Group" is not an actual legal entity but merely a marketing concept.

Chery group sales data by country
| Year | Global | China | Russia | Mexico | Brazil | Turkey | Egypt | Chile | South Africa | Israel | Australia | Indonesia | Ukraine | Argentina | Uruguay | Colombia | UAE | Iran |
|---|---|---|---|---|---|---|---|---|---|---|---|---|---|---|---|---|---|---|
| 2003 | | 85,349 | | | | | | | | | | | | | | | | |
| 2004 | | 87,138 | | | | | | | | | | | | | | | | |
| 2005 | | 189,445 | | | | | | | | | | | | | | | | |
| 2006 | | 292,291 | | | | | | | | | | | | | | | | |
| 2007 | | 379,001 | 37,120 | | | | | | | | | | | | | | | |
| 2008 | | 334,800 | 15,728 | | | | | | | | | | | | | | | |
| 2009 | | 411,231 | 4,922 | | | | | | | | | | | | | | | |
| 2010 | 750,456 | 548,444 | 8,909 | | | | | | | | | | | | | | | |
| 2011 | 729,497 | 551,072 | 6,624 | | | | | | | | | | | | | | | |
| 2012 | 653,476 | 533,161 | 19,004 | | | | | | | | | | | | | | | |
| 2013 | 561,062 | 437,044 | 19,855 | | | | | | | | | | | | | | | |
| 2014 | 570,718 | 494,824 | 18,139 | | 9,097 | 325 | | | 1,297 | | 592 | 1,231 | | 3,775 | 3,059 | 5,037 | 5,860 | 29,449 |
| 2015 | 575,108 | 410,591 | 4,964 | | 3,630 | 394 | | | 746 | | 201 | 446 | | 4,572 | 1,437 | 4,794 | 5,716 | 32,730 |
| 2016 | 682,474 | 504,247 | 4,758 | | 1,362 | | 8,173 | | 333 | | 19 | 66 | | 3,670 | 431 | 1,573 | 3,514 | 41,019 |
| 2017 | 604,708 | 455,718 | 5,905 | | 3,536 | | 5,477 | 6,430 | 184 | | 7 | | | 7,027 | 417 | 865 | | |
| 2018 | 752,759 | 427,811 | 5,611 | | 8,353 | | 4,649 | 8,261 | | | 1 | | | 6,152 | 123 | 798 | | |
| 2019 | 747,806 | 411,179 | 6,358 | | 19,824 | | 5,582 | 7,178 | | | | | 1,672 | 1,998 | 480 | 597 | | |
| 2020 | 731,117 | 450,786 | 11,452 | | 19,456 | | 9,844 | 7,078 | | | | | 1,974 | 1,319 | 694 | 429 | | |
| 2021 | 961,926 | 644,322 | 40,874 | | 39,739 | | 16,314 | 26,906 | | | | | 4,653 | 1,144 | 687 | | | |
| 2022 | 1,232,727 | 781,390 | 52,183 | 7,450 | 35,033 | | 18,918 | 24,953 | 8,013 | 593 | | | 687 | 836 | 788 | | | |
| 2023 | 1,881,316 | 765,209 | 206,035 | 38,484 | 31,290 | 27,587 | 10,209 | 13,204 | 16,110 | 11,127 | 5,890 | 4,099 | 1,143 | 426 | 900 | | | |

== See also ==
- Automobile manufacturers and brands of China
- List of automobile manufacturers of China
- List of automotive manufacturers by production
- Automotive industry in China
