= Jaecoo J8 =

Mid-size crossover SUV

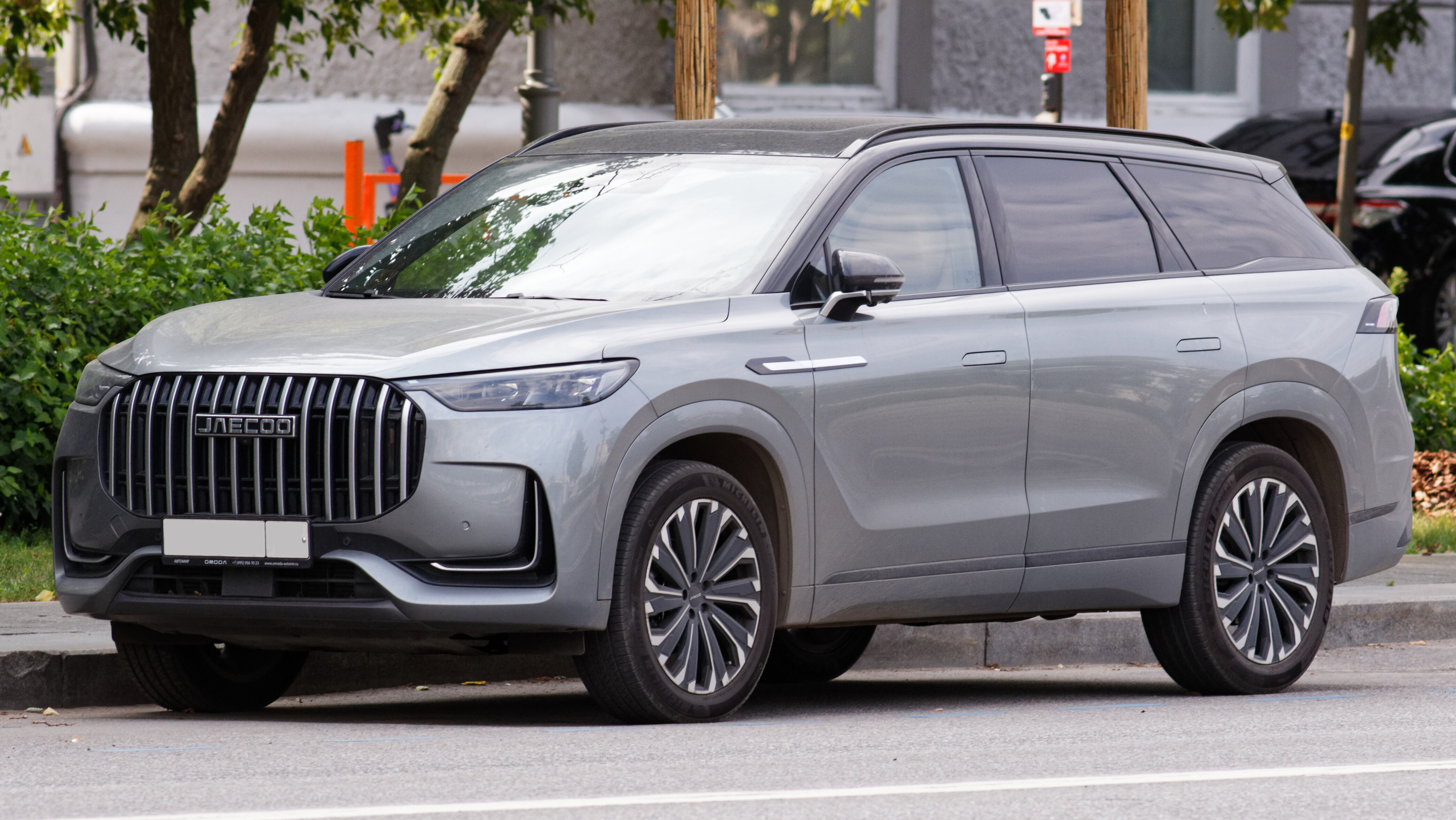
- Jaecoo J8 (Russia)

Overview
- Manufacturer: Chery
- Also called: Jaecoo 8; Chery Tiggo 9 (China); Chery Fulwin T10 (China, plug-in hybrid); Jeland J8 (Russia); Lucano L8 (Iran)
- Production: 2023–present
- Assembly: China: Wuhu, Anhui; Malaysia: Shah Alam; Indonesia: Bekasi, West Java (HIM); Iran: Savojbolagh, Alborz (Mammut Group)
- Designer: Zheming Liu

Body and chassis
- Class: Mid-size crossover SUV
- Body style: 5-door SUV
- Layout: Front-engine, front-wheel-drive or four-wheel-drive
- Platform: T1X platform
- Related: Chery Tiggo 9X / Fulwin T9; Exeed Yaoguang/RX / Omoda C9/9

Powertrain
- Engine: Petrol: 2.0 L Acteco F4J20 turbo I4; Petrol plug-in hybrid: 1.5 L SQRH4J15 turbo I4 (SHS-P; export); 2.0 L Acteco SQRD4T20 turbo I4 (C-DM; China)
- Electric motor: Permanent magnet synchronous reluctance (PHEV/C-DM/SHS-P)
- Transmission: 8-speed automatic; 7-speed dual-clutch
- Hybrid drivetrain: Plug-in hybrid
- Battery: 34.4 kWh CATL LFP (PHEV/C-DM/SHS-P)
- Range: CLTC: 1,300 km (808 mi) (PHEV/C-DM; China); 1,400 km (870 mi) (PHEV/SHS-P; export)
- Electric range: CLTC: 210 km (130 mi) (PHEV/C-DM; China); 180 km (112 mi) (PHEV/SHS-P; export)

Dimensions
- Wheelbase: 2,820 mm (111.0 in)
- Length: 4,820 mm (189.8 in)
- Width: 1,930 mm (76.0 in)
- Height: 1,699 mm (66.9 in)

The Jaecoo J8 (also known as Jaecoo 8) is a three-row mid-size crossover SUV produced by Chery since 2023, available as a five-seater and a three-row seven-seater model. Outside China, the vehicle is marketed under the Jaecoo brand as its second product. It is available in both a petrol and a plug-in hybrid model.

In China, it is marketed as the Chery Fulwin T10 (Chinese: 奇瑞风云T10; pinyin: Qíruì Fēngyún T10) for the plug-in hybrid model, under the Chery Fulwin product series, it was launched in China in April 2024. Initially, it was introduced as the Fulwin T9 in 2023, before the name was transferred to a smaller model.

== Overview ==
The production version of the Chinese market Tiggo 9 was revealed in March 2023 at the 2023 Auto Shanghai in China. The Chinese market Tiggo 9 for export markets were initially introduced as the Jaecoo 9, but was later renamed to Jaecoo J8 or Jaecoo 8. The Jaecoo J8/8 made its global debut in Qatar in October 2023.

The vehicle is based on the T1X platform unibody chassis and features CDC suspension, which realises intelligent full-sensing adjustment through stepless adjustment of suspension hardness. For the suspension, MacPherson struts are used for the front and multi-link suspension for the rear. The wheels are 20-inch in size.

The interior of the vehicle features a dual-curved screen with a 12.3-inch LCD instrument panel and a 12.3-inch central control screen curved towards the driver. The digital functionalities of the infotainment system are powered by a Qualcomm Snapdragon 8155 chip. For the audio system, the vehicle is equipped with a 14-speaker Sony surround sound system.

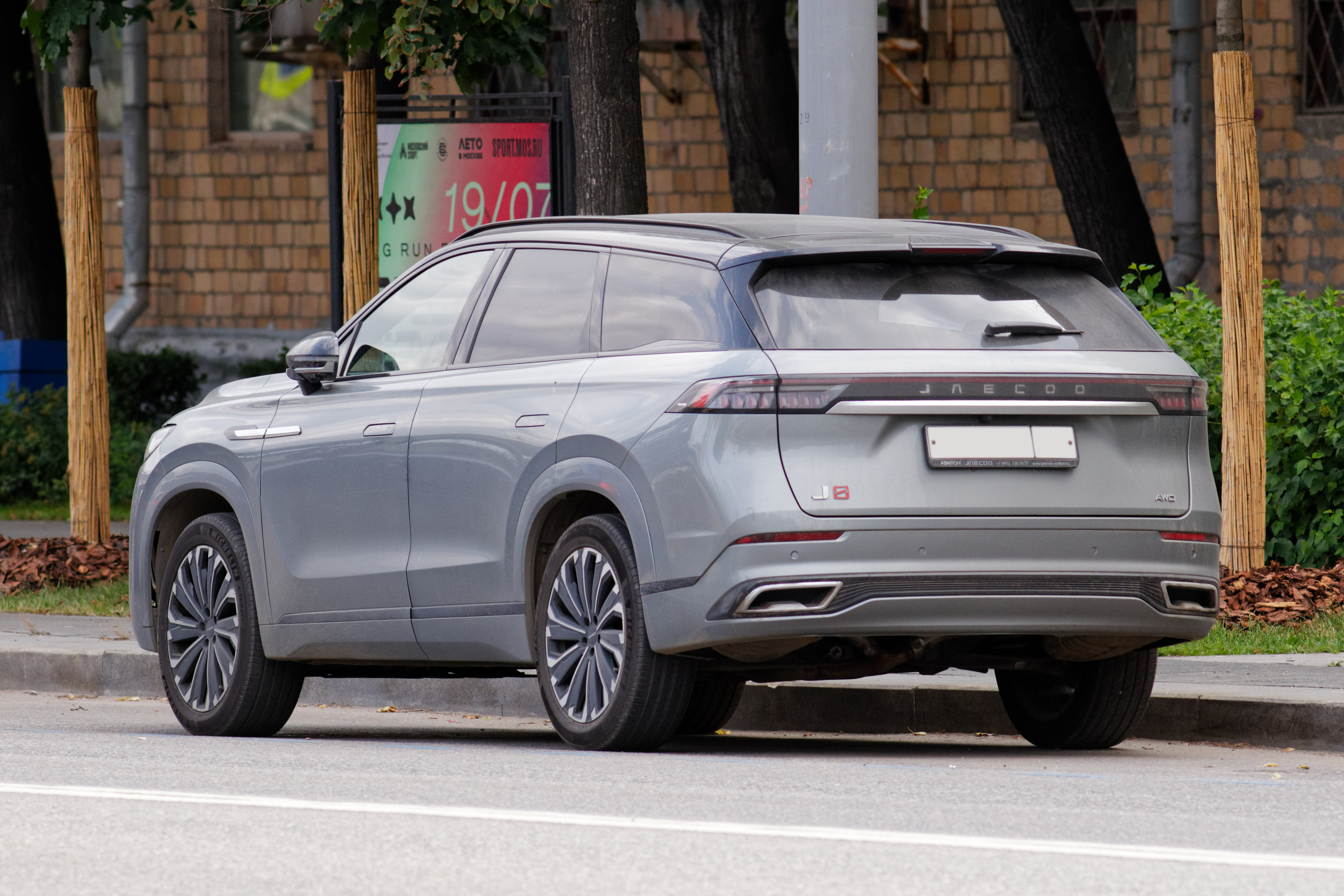
Rear view

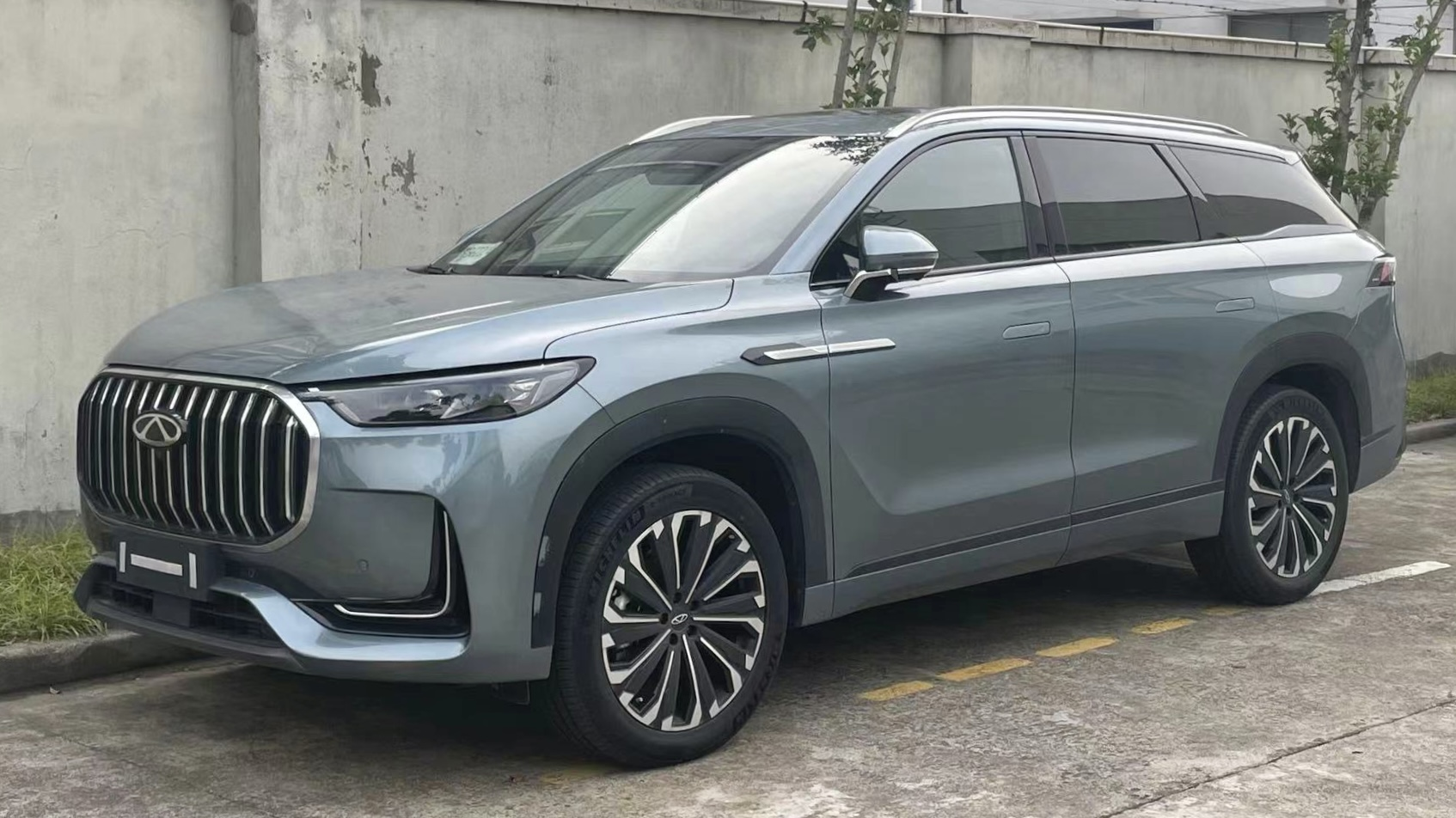
Chery Tiggo 9

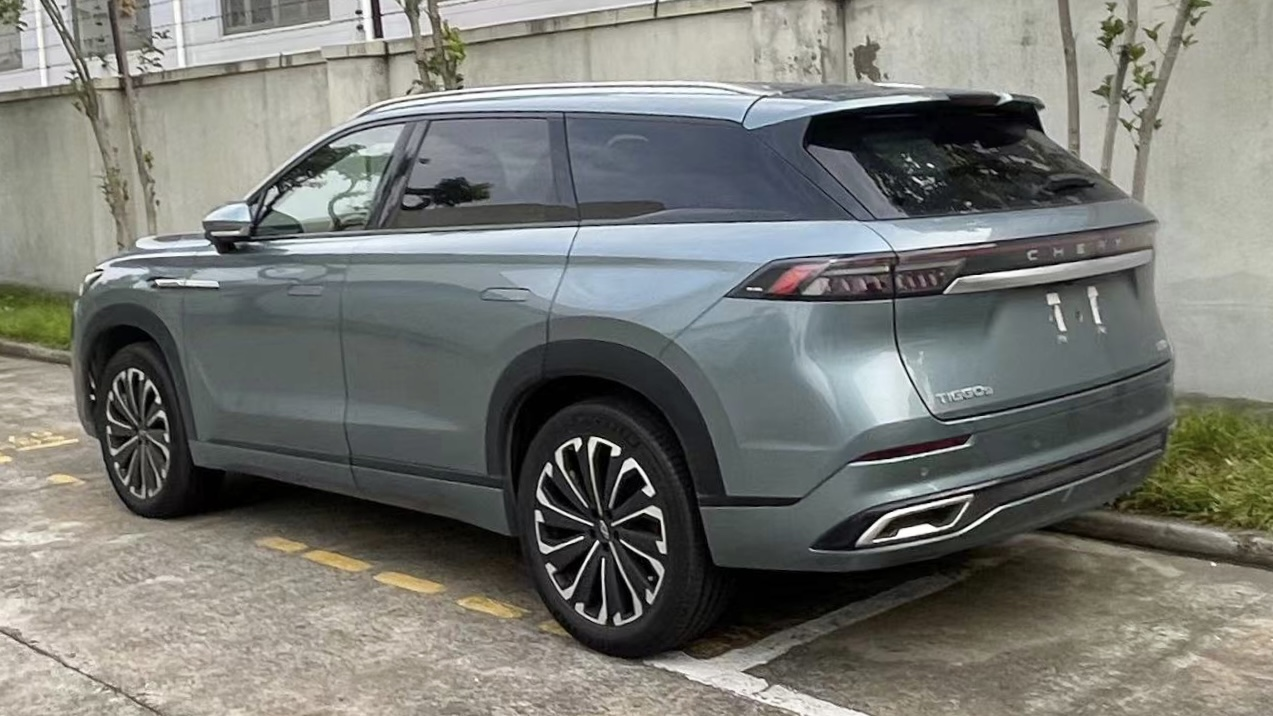
Chery Tiggo 9 rear view

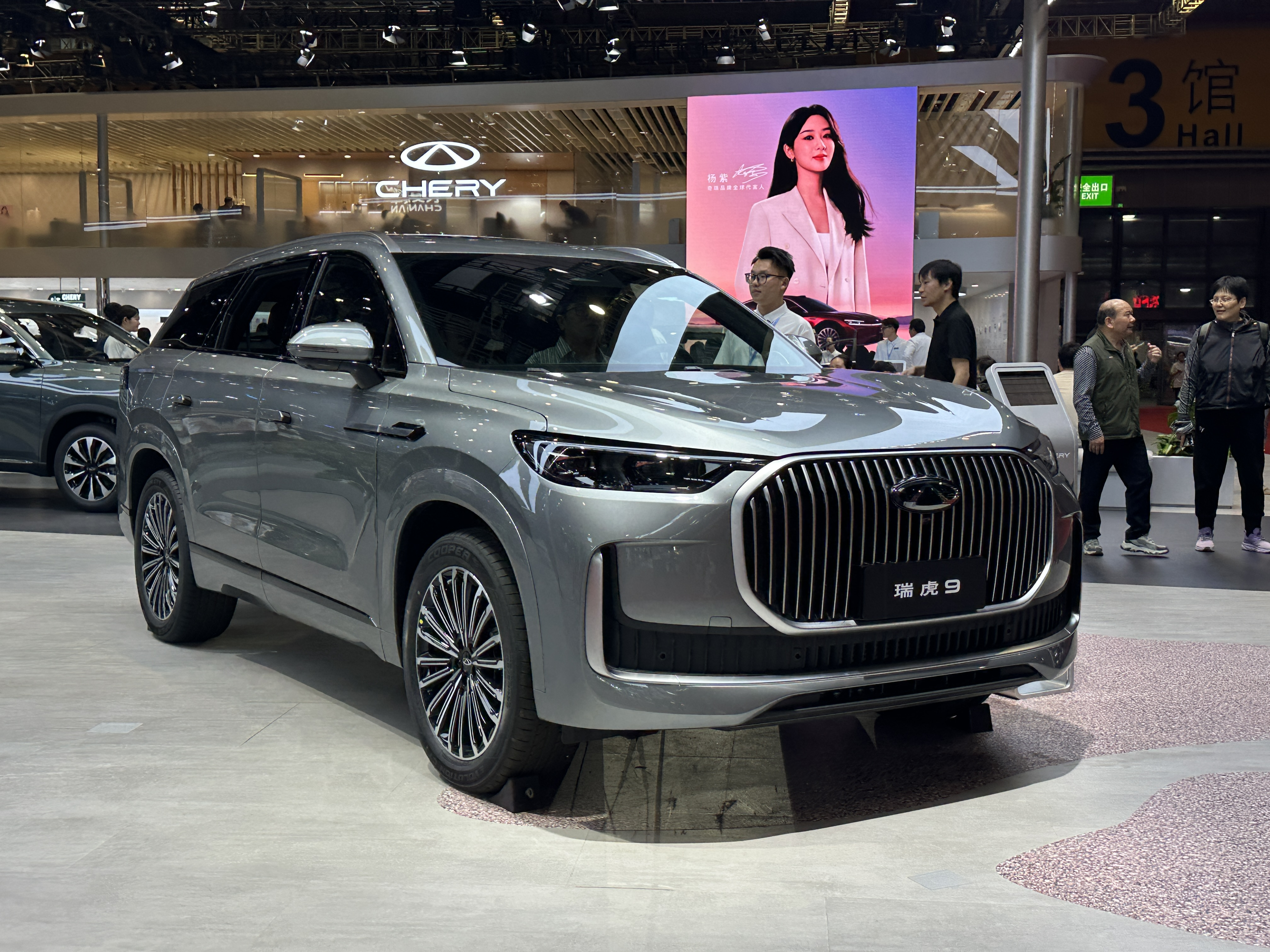
Chery Tiggo 9 2024 facelift

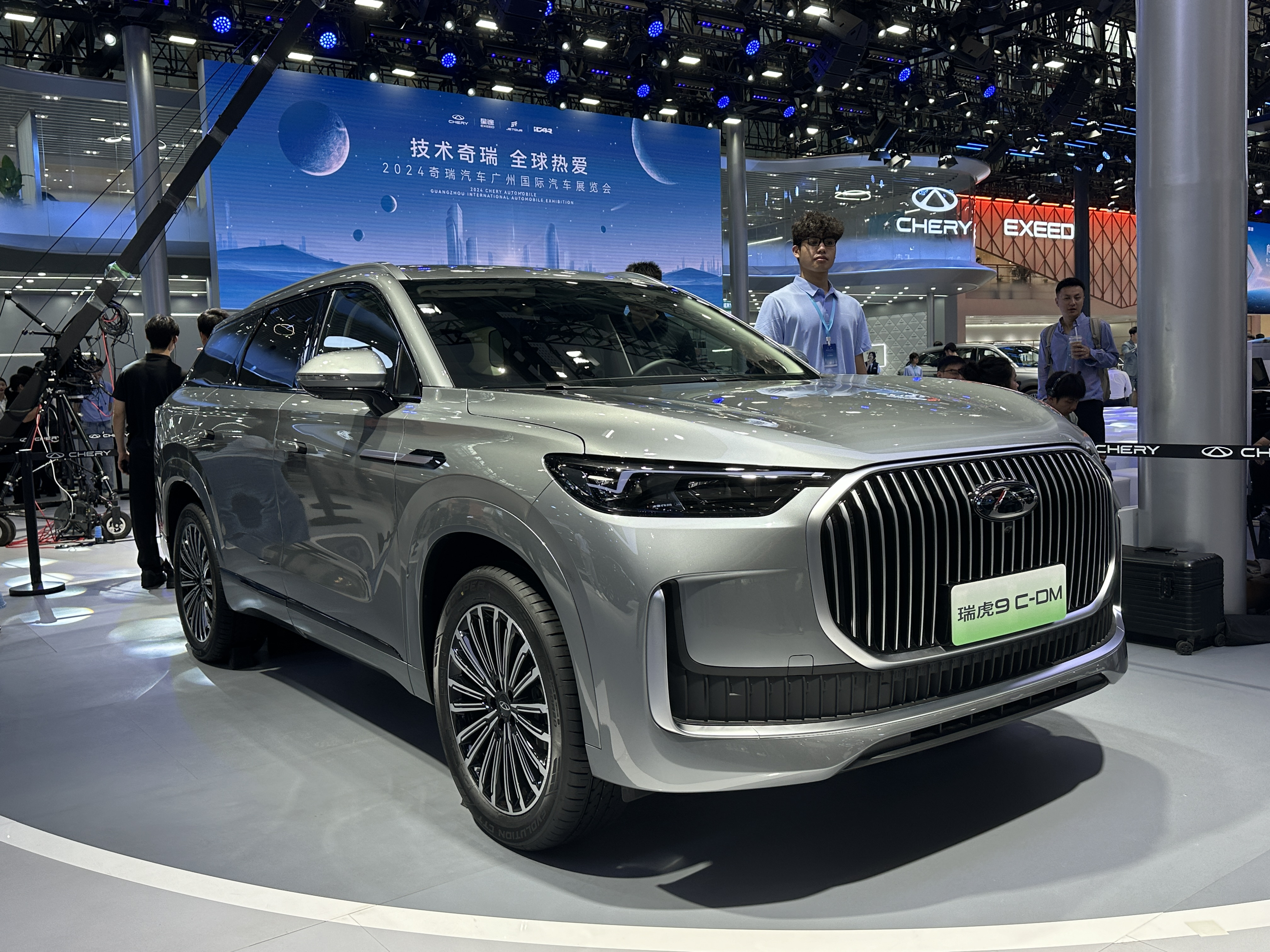
Chery Tiggo 9 C-DM

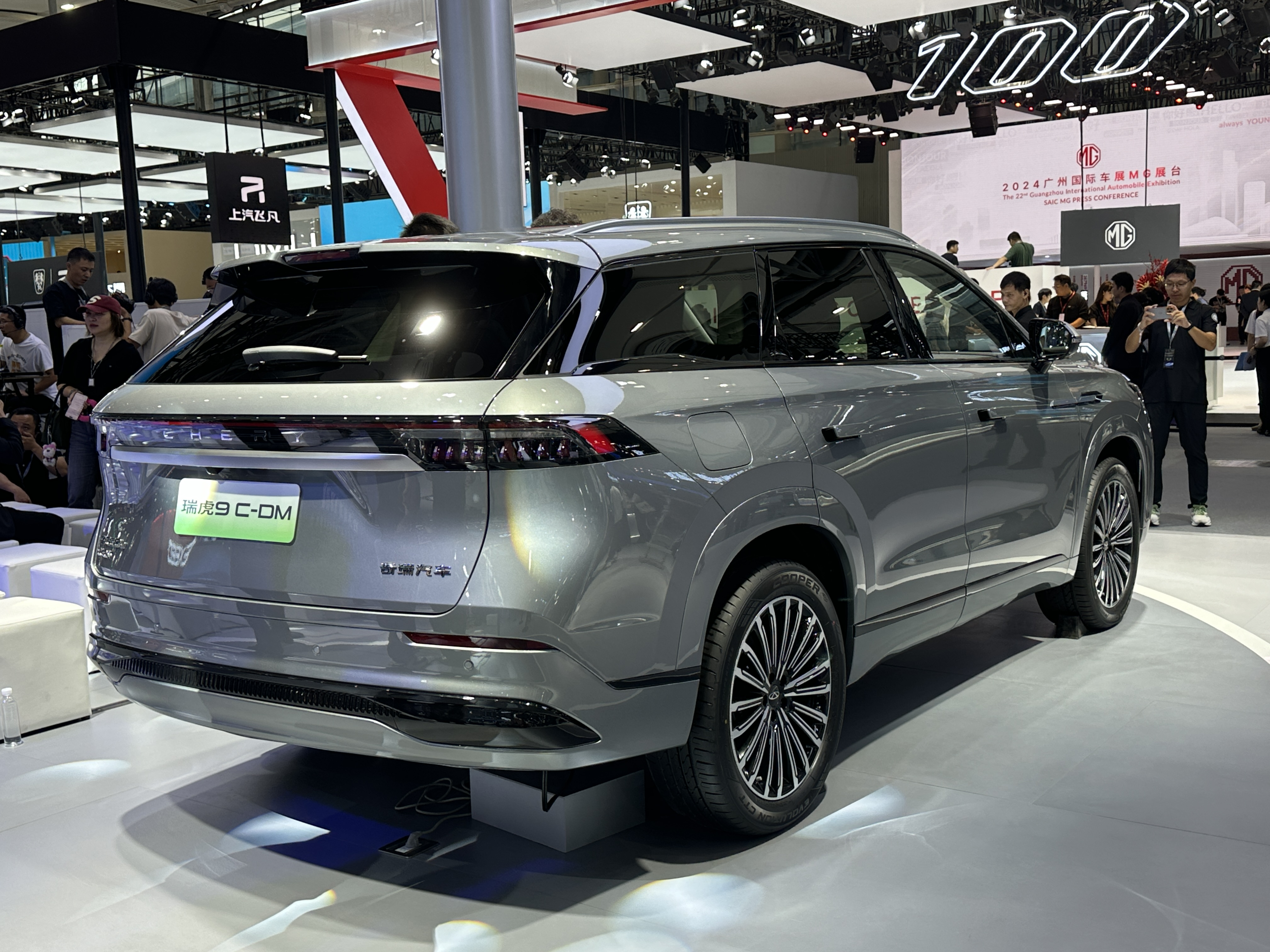
Chery Tiggo 9 C-DM rear view

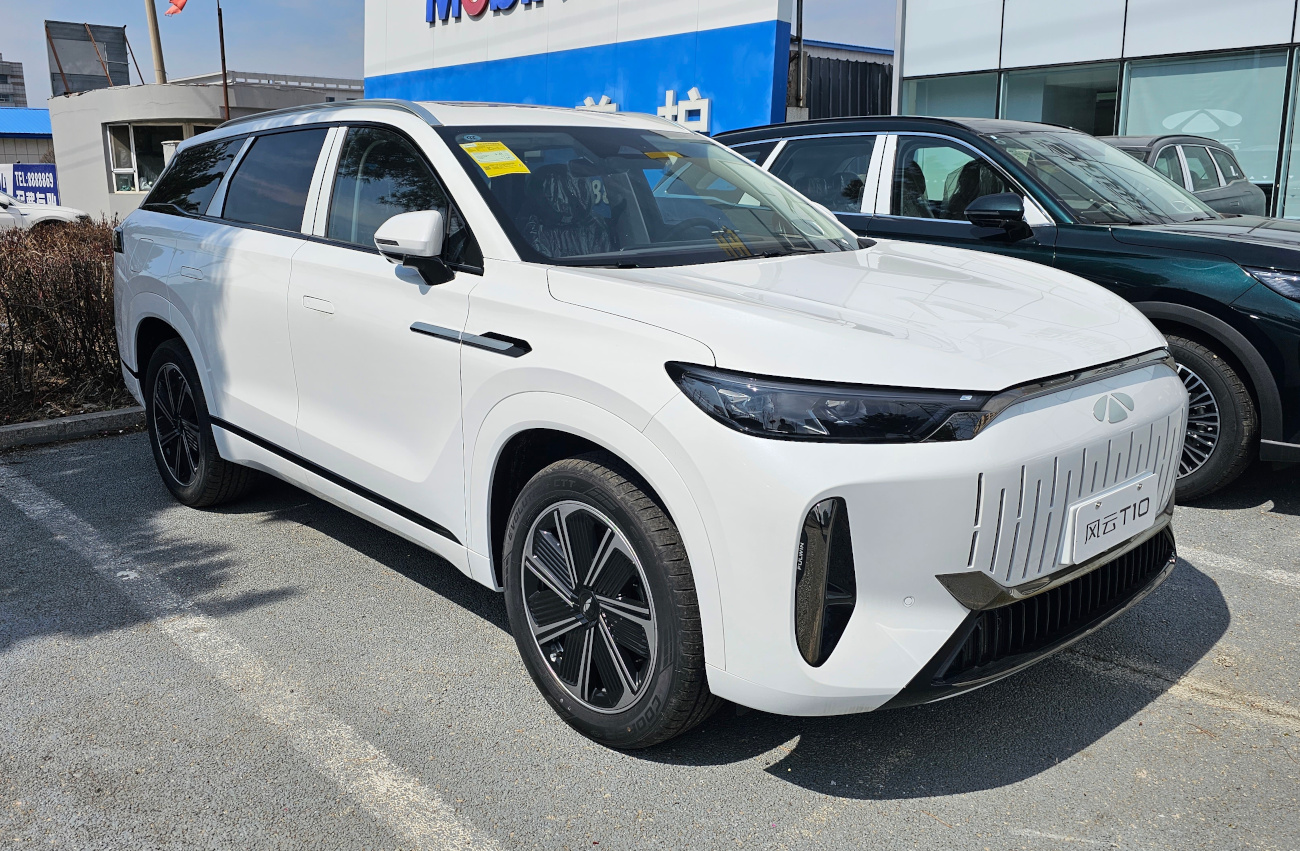
Chery Fulwin T10

=== Powertrain ===
The vehicle is powered by a Kunpeng Power 2.0-litre TGDi inline-four turbocharged petrol engine produces 195 kW (261 hp; 265 PS) and 400 N⋅m (295 lb⋅ft; 41 kg⋅m) of torque. The engine is paired to an Aisin 8-speed automatic transmission with paddle shifters and powers all four wheels. The top speed is 205 km/h (127 mph), with a combined fuel consumption of 7.7 L/100 km (13.0 km/L; 36.7 mpg_{‑imp}; 30.5 mpg_{‑US}). For the Chinese market, the Chery Dual Mode (C-DM) plug-in hybrid version is powered by a 2.0-litre turbocharged petrol PHEV Kunpeng Super Intelligent Hybrid version is also available, with a 0–100 km/h (0–62 mph) acceleration in 4.5 seconds and a CLTC range of 1,300 km (808 mi). The battery of the plug-in hybrid version can be recharged from 30% to 80% in 18 minutes.

For export markets, the plug-in hybrid (PHEV) version is powered by a SQRH4J15 1.5-litre inline-four turbocharged petrol PHEV produces a combined output of 395 kW (530 hp; 537 PS) and 650 N⋅m (479 lb⋅ft; 66 kg⋅m) of torque paired with a 3-speed Dedicated Hybrid Transmission, marketed as the Super Hybrid System (SHS). The export market plug-in hybrid (PHEV) version has a 0–100 km/h (0–62 mph) acceleration in 5.8 seconds, a pure electric range of 180 km (112 mi), and a CLTC range of 1,400 km (870 mi).

== Markets ==
=== Australia ===
The J8 was launched in Australia on 7 May 2025, in two variants: Track (2WD) and Ridge (AWD), both variants are powered by a 2.0-litre turbocharged petrol engine. In Australia, both variants are a 5-seater configuration. In June 2026, the SHS petrol plug-in hybrid model was introduced in Australia for the flagship Summit trim.

=== Europe ===
In October 2025, the Jaecoo 8 was confirmed to be released in the United Kingdom and Europe in the first half of 2026. The Jaecoo 8 made its European debut in May 2026. It is available with two trim levels: Luxury (7-seater) and Executive (6-seater), both trims are powered only by the 1.5-litre turbocharged petrol plug-in hybrid (SHS).

=== Indonesia ===
The J8 SHS ARDIS the plug-in hybrid version had its world premiere on 22 July 2025, shortly before the 32nd Gaikindo Indonesia International Auto Show. The J8 was launched in Indonesia on 23 July 2025 at the 32nd Gaikindo Indonesia International Auto Show, featuring two variants: ARDIS and SHS ARDIS. These variants are powered by either a 2.0-litre turbocharged petrol engine or a 1.5-litre turbocharged petrol plug-in hybrid (SHS). Both variants come equipped with the All Roads Drive Intelligent System (ARDIS) for the all-wheel drive system. In Indonesia, both variants are a 6-seater configuration.

=== Malaysia ===
The J8 was first introduced in Malaysia in January 2024, then was previewed in Malaysia in March 2025 in the right-hand drive Malaysian specification model, and was launched on 18 July 2025. In Malaysia, two variants are available: 2WD (5-seater) and AWD (6-seater), both variants are powered by the 2.0-litre turbocharged petrol engine.

=== Singapore ===
The Jaecoo 8 was launched in Singapore on 6 May 2026, in the sole variant powered by the 1.5-litre turbocharged petrol plug-in hybrid (SHS).

== Sales ==
Year	Australia	Indonesia	Malaysia (Note: Figures based on registration (Malaysia))
2025	652	274	754
