= Chery Tiggo 9X =

Mid-size crossover SUV

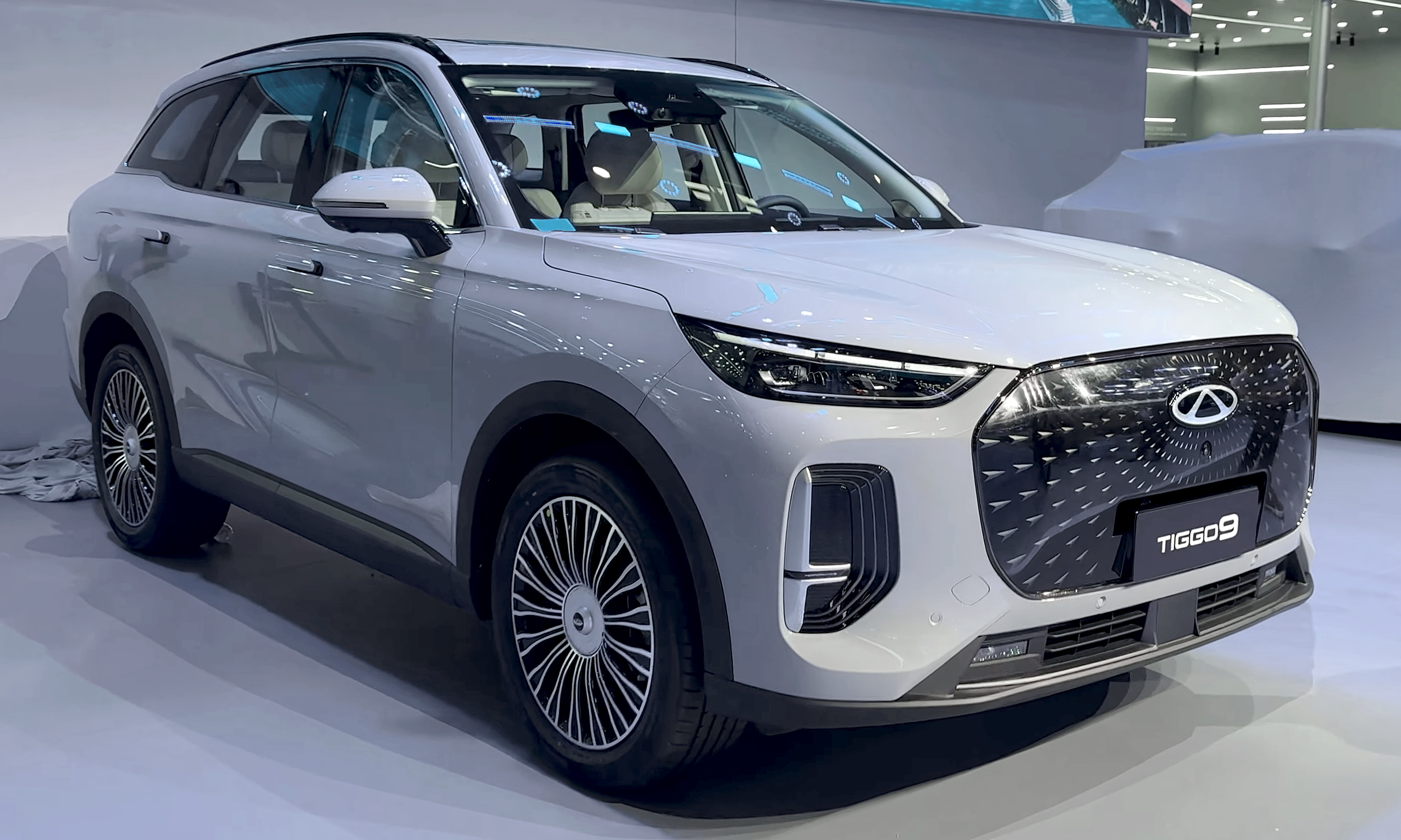
- Chery Tiggo 9 (global)

Overview
- Manufacturer: Chery
- Also called: Chery Tiggo 8L (China, 2024–2026); Chery Tiggo 9 (export); Chery Fulwin T9; Ebro S900 (Spain); Tenet T9 (Russia); Fownix F9 (Iran)
- Production: 2024–present; December 2023 – present (Fulwin T9)
- Assembly: China: Qingdao, Shandong; Indonesia: Bekasi, West Java (HIM); Pakistan: Port Qasim, Karachi

Body and chassis
- Class: Mid-size crossover SUV
- Body style: 5-door SUV
- Layout: Front-engine, front-motor, front-wheel-drive; Front-engine, front-motor, all-wheel-drive
- Related: Chery Tiggo 9/Fulwin T10 / Jaecoo J8/8; Exeed Yaoguang/RX / Omoda C9/9

Powertrain
- Engine: Petrol: 2.0 L Kunpeng turbo I4; Petrol plug-in hybrid: 1.5 L turbo I4
- Electric motor: Permanent magnet synchronous reluctance
- Transmission: 8-speed automatic; 3-speed DHT (hybrid)
- Hybrid drivetrain: Plug-in hybrid

Dimensions
- Wheelbase: 2,770 mm (109.1 in)
- Length: 4,810 mm (189.4 in); 4,817 mm (189.6 in) (Tiggo 9X); 4,795 mm (188.8 in) (Fulwin T9)
- Width: 1,925 mm (75.8 in); 1,930 mm (76.0 in) (Fulwin T9, Tiggo 9X)
- Height: 1,741 mm (68.5 in); 1,738 mm (68.4 in) (Fulwin T9); 1,729 mm (68.1 in) (Tiggo 9X)

The Chery Tiggo 9X (Chinese: 奇瑞瑞虎9X; pinyin: Qíruì Ruìhǔ 9X), formerly the Chery Tiggo 8L (Chinese: 奇瑞瑞虎8L; pinyin: Qíruì Ruìhǔ 8L) in China until 2026, is a mid-size crossover SUV produced by Chery under the Tiggo product series. Was revealed in May 2024, it is a larger vehicle than the older Tiggo 8. Outside China, it is marketed as the Chery Tiggo 9, a different model than the Chinese market Chery Tiggo 9.

== Specifications ==
The model was initially marketed as the Chery Tiggo 8L. Compared to the original Tiggo 8, the Tiggo 8L is 60 mm (2.4 in) longer in size and 80 mm (3.1 in) longer in wheelbase. The Tiggo 8L adopts many technologies self-developed by Chery, including Kunpeng 2.0-litre turbocharged engine, Kunpeng eight-speed automatic transmission, AWD intelligent four-wheel drive system and magnetic suspension chassis.

In September 2025, the model received a mid-cycle refresh and a renaming as the Chery Tiggo 9X.

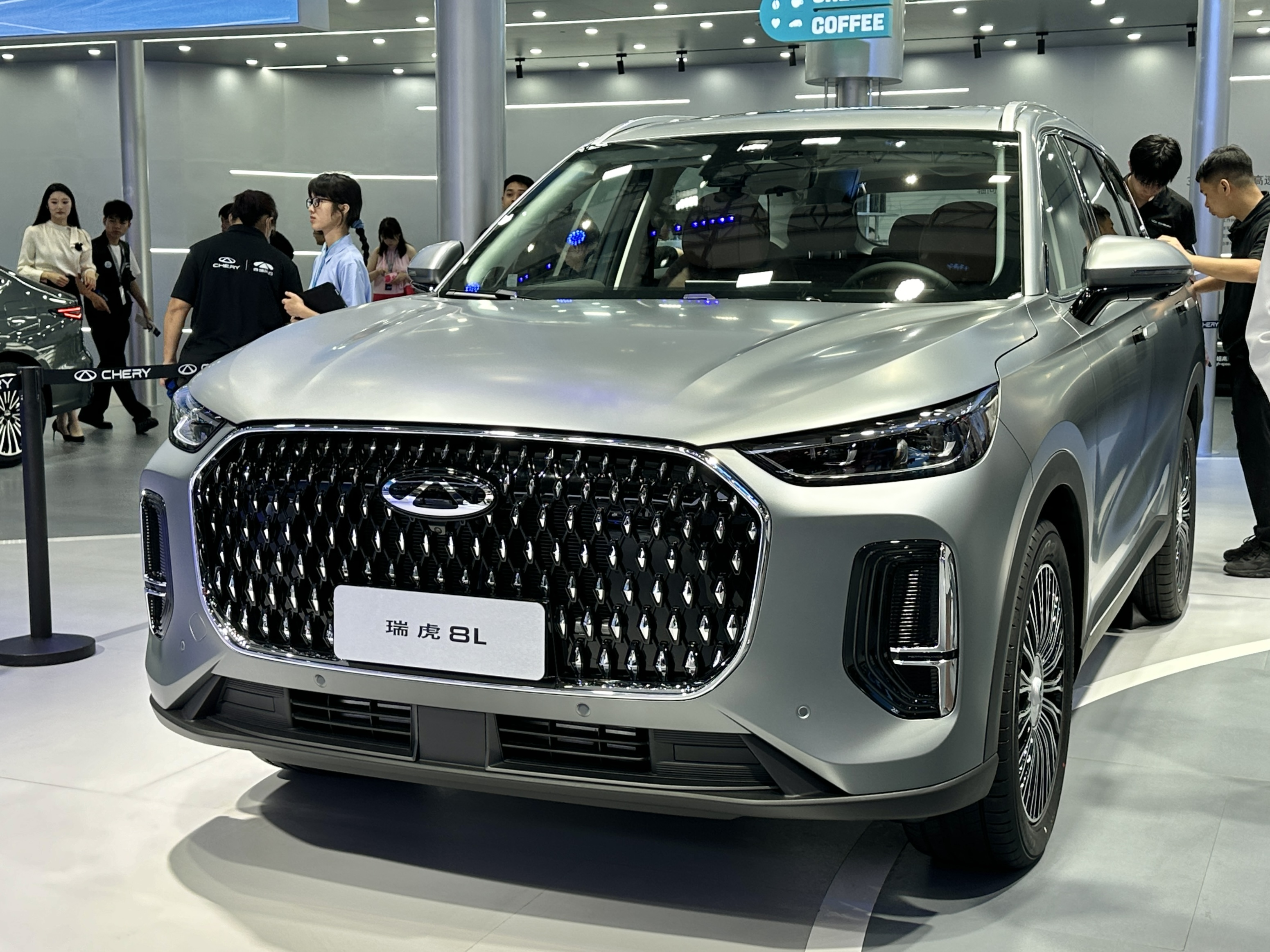
Chery Tiggo 8L

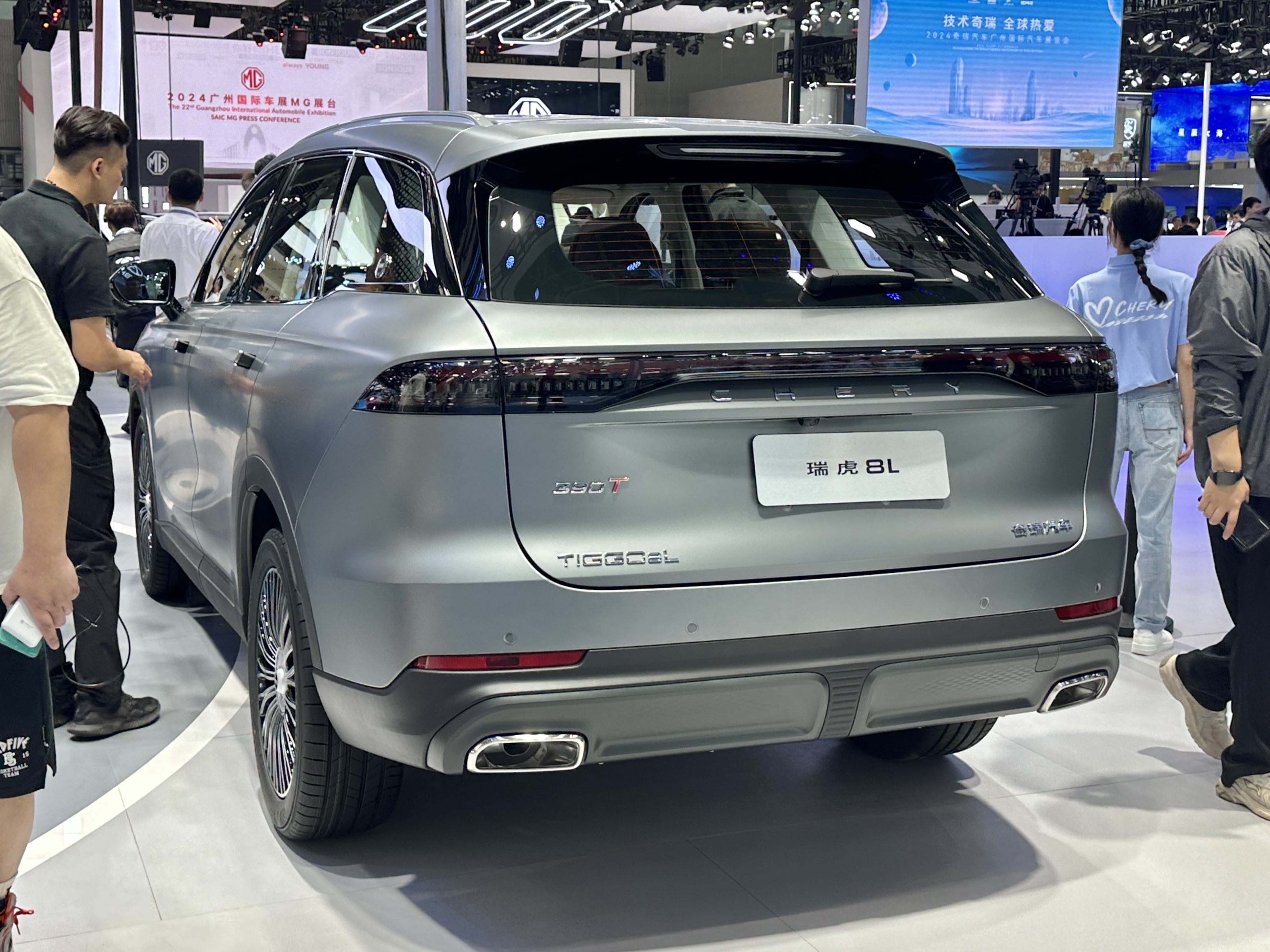
Rear view

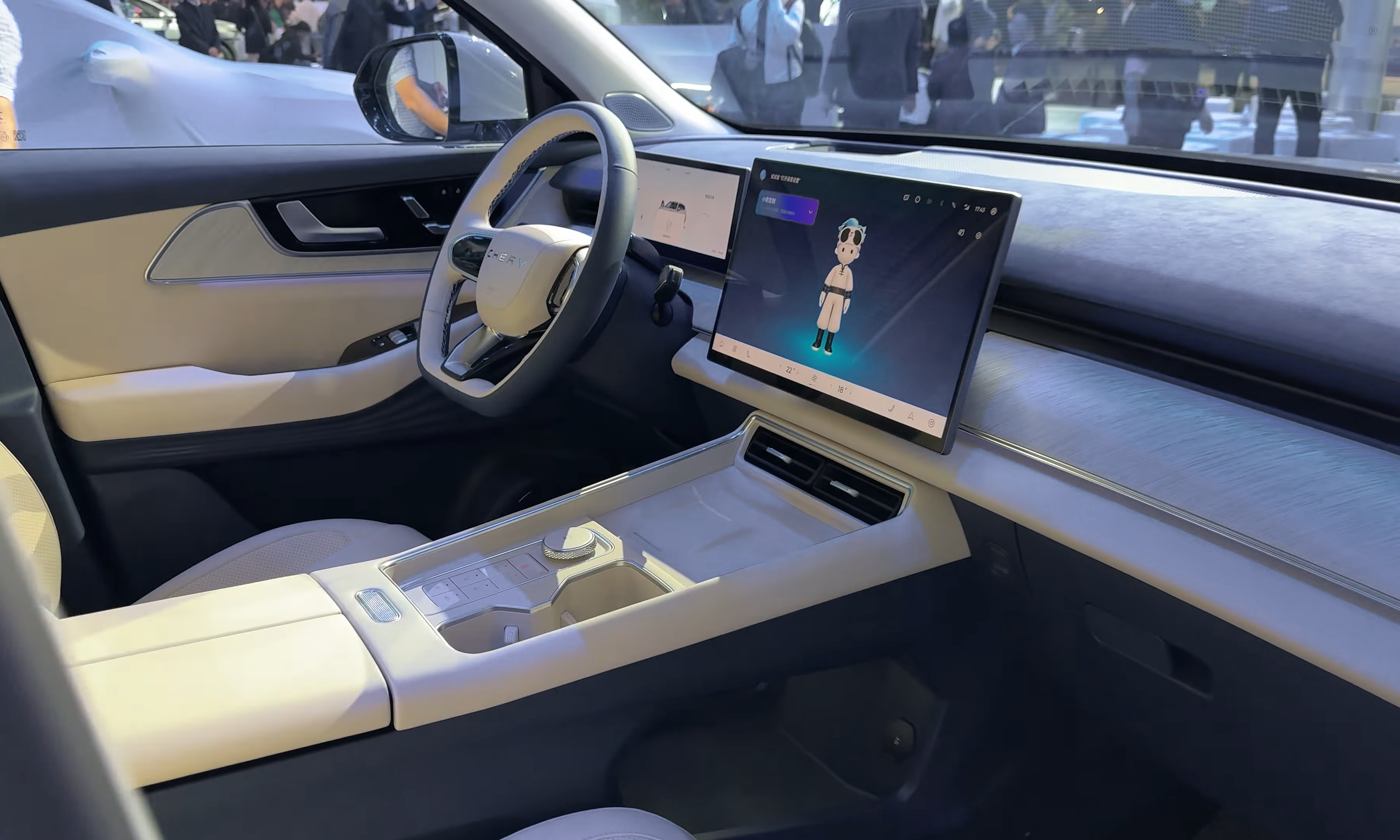
Interior

Chery Tiggo 9X

Rear view

== Chery Fulwin T9 ==
At the 2024 Beijing Auto Show in April 2024, the Chery was announced the Chery Fulwin T9 (Chinese: 奇瑞风云T9; pinyin: Qíruì Fēngyún T9), which is the PHEV variant of Tiggo 8L with a different front end design. It is slotting below the slightly larger Chery Fulwin T10 which is the PHEV variant of Tiggo 9. It is powered by a plug-in hybrid 1.5-litre and an electric motor paired with a 3-speed DHT transmission. This PHEV powertrain is marketed as the Kunpeng Super Hybrid C-DM. It will be available with two-row and three-row seating options.

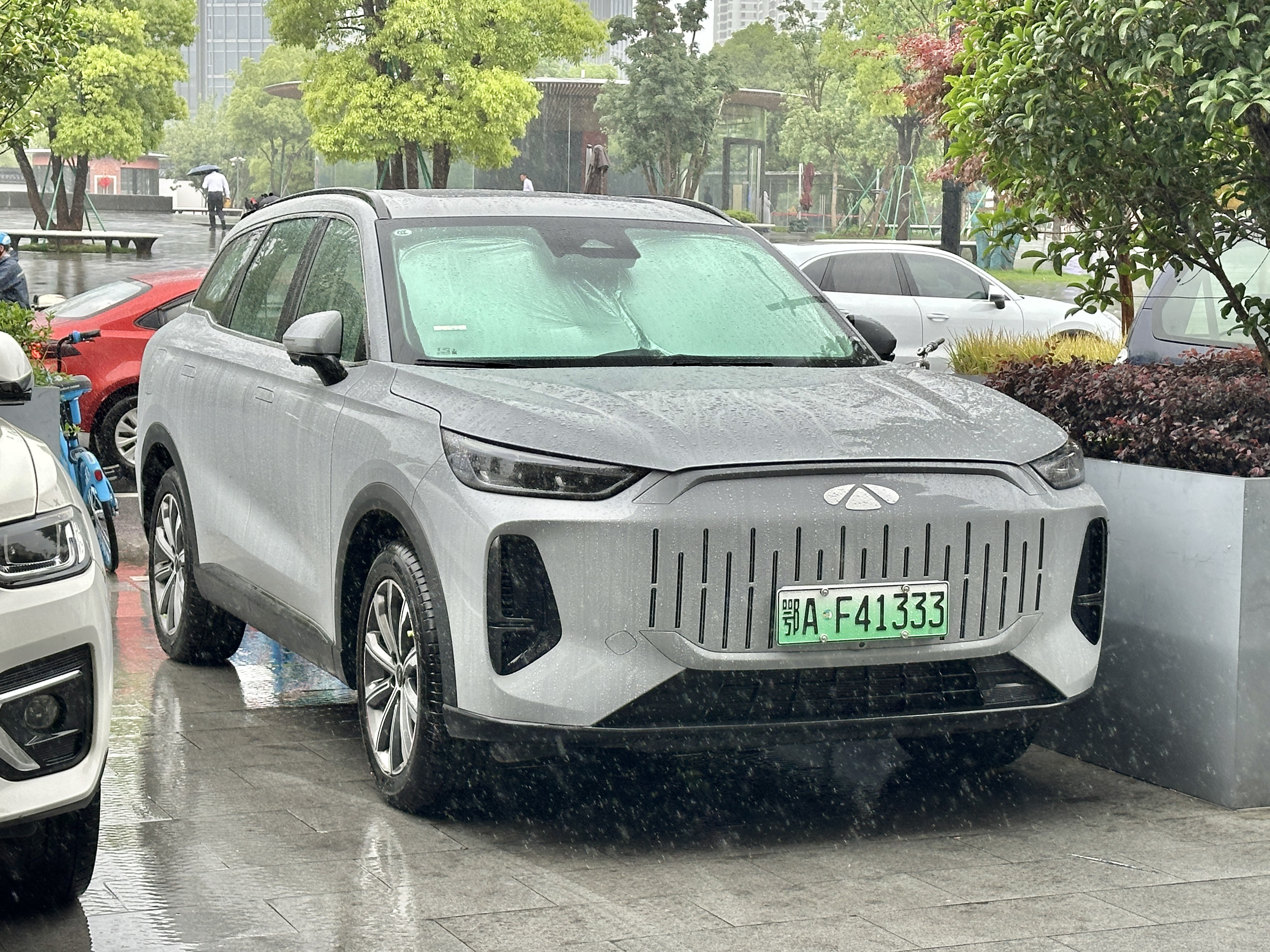
Chery Fulwin T9

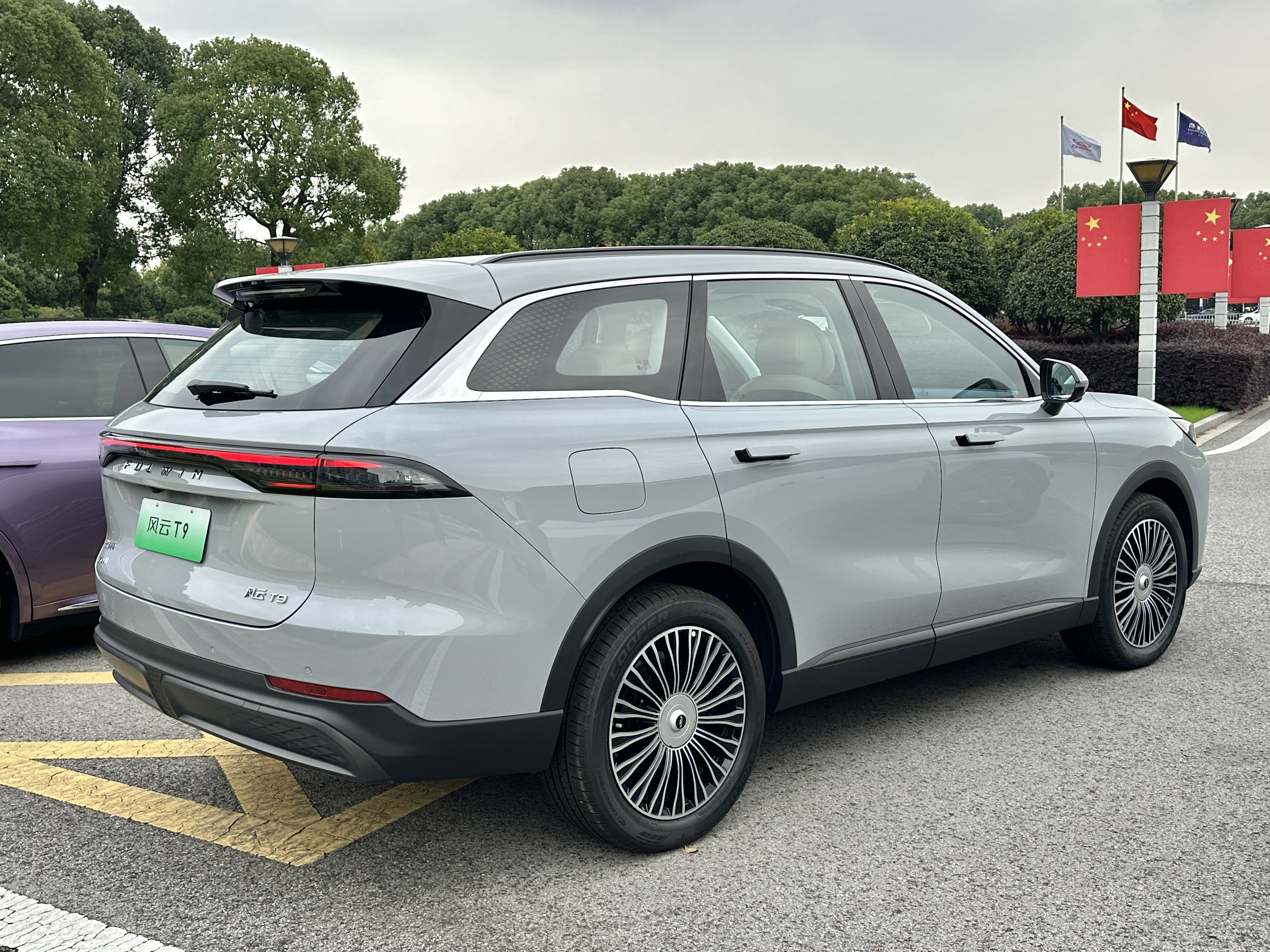
Rear view

== Markets ==
=== Australia ===
The Tiggo 9 went on sale in Australia on 8 October 2025, in the sole Ultimate AWD variant powered by the 1.5-litre turbocharged petrol plug-in hybrid. In April 2026, the entry-level Elite FWD variant using the 1.5-litre turbocharged petrol plug-in hybrid was added to the line-up.

=== Brazil ===
The Tiggo 9 was launched in Brazil on 5 October 2026, with two variants, powered by either a 2.0-litre turbocharged petrol or a 1.5-litre turbocharged petrol plug-in hybrid.

=== Europe ===
The Tiggo 9 made its European debut in October 2025, followed by its Italian presentation in July 2026. In the European market, it is available with a 1.5-litre turbocharged petrol plug-in hybrid powertrain branded under the Super Hybrid name, offered exclusively in the Summit trim.

=== Indonesia ===
The Tiggo 9 was launched in Indonesia on 25 July 2025 at the 32nd Gaikindo Indonesia International Auto Show. Locally assembled in Indonesia, it is available in the sole CSH variant powered by the 1.5-litre turbocharged petrol plug-in hybrid.

=== Malaysia ===
The Tiggo 9 was launched in Malaysia on 23 June 2026, in the sole variant powered by the 2.0-litre turbocharged petrol and comes standard with all-wheel drive.

=== South Africa ===
The Tiggo 9 was launched in South Africa on 21 August 2025, with two trim levels: Pinnacle (FWD) and Vanguard (AWD), it is powered by either a 2.0-litre turbocharged petrol or a 1.5-litre turbocharged petrol plug-in hybrid.

== Sales ==
Year	China		Indonesia
Year	Tiggo 8L	Fulwin T9	Tiggo 9 CSH
2024	16,469	50,586	—
2025	39,319	53,454	386
