= Chery Tiggo 9 =

Mid-size crossover SUV

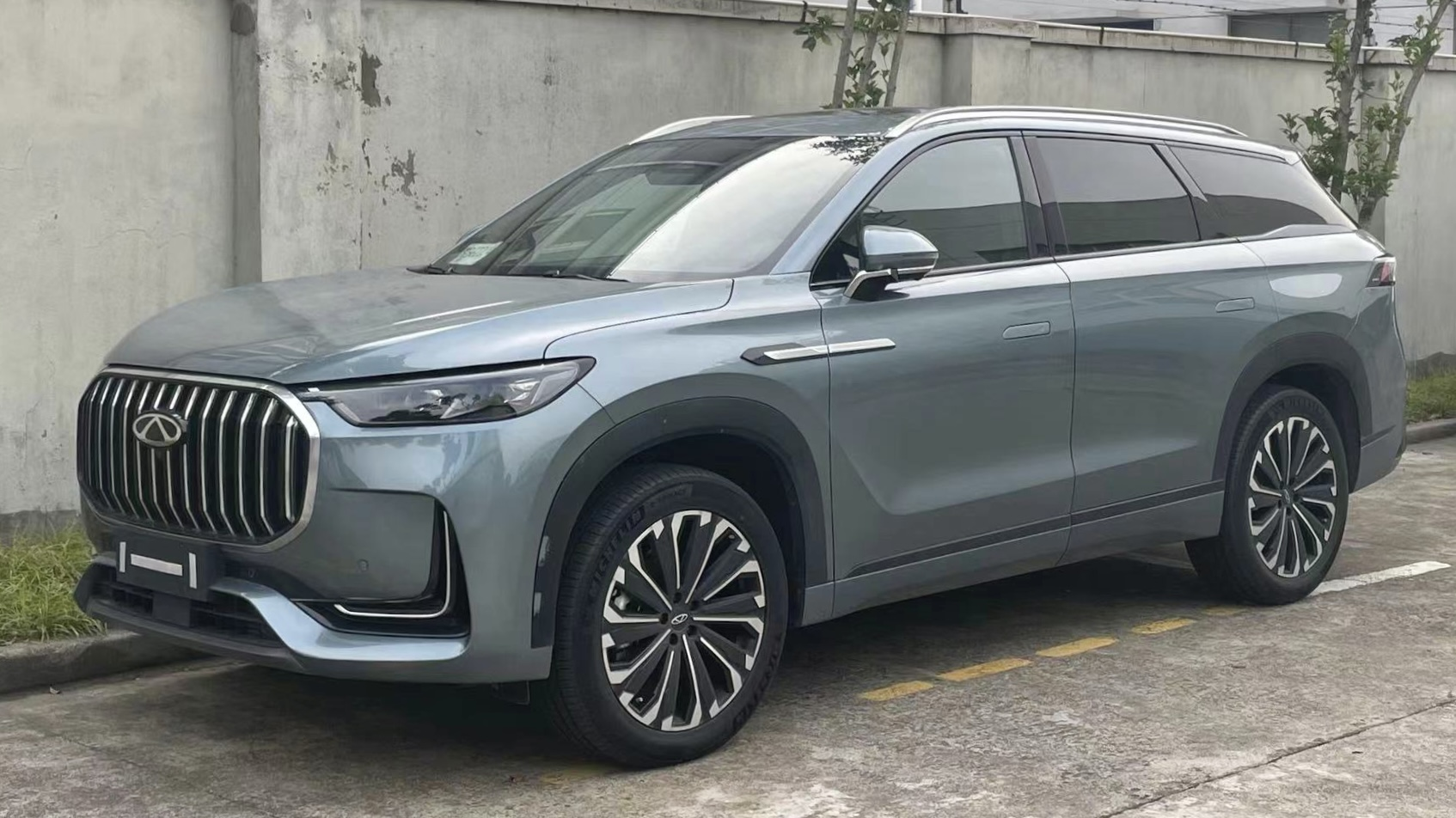
- Chery Tiggo 9 (China)

Overview
- Manufacturer: Chery
- Production: 2023–present (China); 2024–present (global)

Body and chassis
- Class: Mid-size SUV
- Body style: 5-door crossover SUV

The Chery Tiggo 9 (Chinese: 奇瑞瑞虎9; pinyin: Qíruì Ruìhǔ 9) is a series of three-row mid-size SUV produced by Chery under the Tiggo product series which was introduced in March 2023. It is positioned as the flagship of the Tiggo series above the Tiggo 8 family and is available as a five-seater and a three-row seven-seater model. It is also exported under the Jaecoo brand as the Jaecoo J8/8.

In March 2024, the Chery launched the plug-in hybrid version of Tiggo 9 called the Chery Fulwin T10 in Chinese market. The global market Tiggo 9 was also released, which is instead a rebadged Tiggo 8L / Fulwin T9 positioned above the Tiggo 8 series.

== Chery Tiggo 9 / Fulwin T10 ==
Chery Tiggo 9
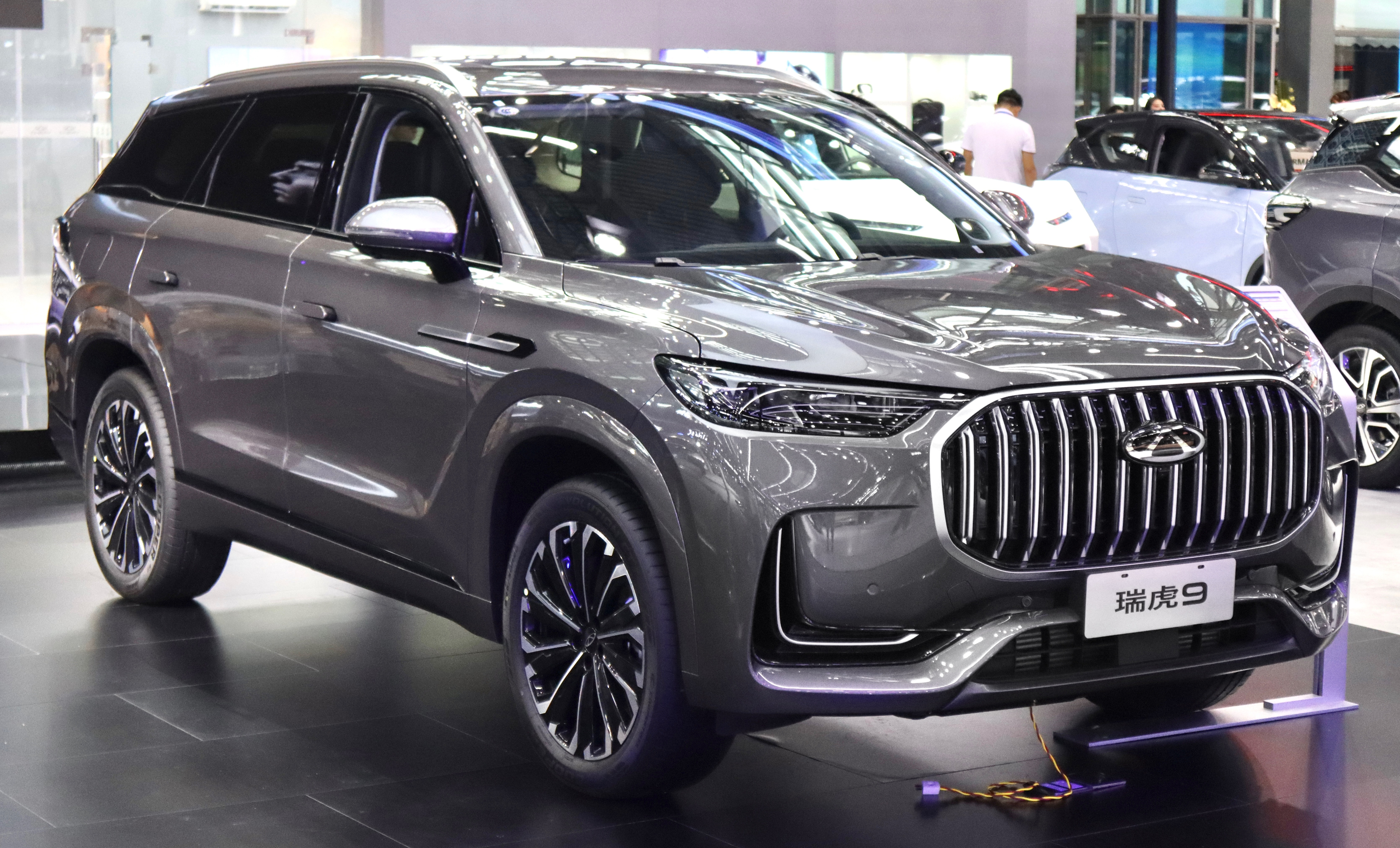

Overview
- Also called: Jaecoo J8/8 (export); Chery Fulwin T10 (2024–2026); Lucano L8 (Iran)
- Production: 2023–present
- Assembly: China: Wuhu, Anhui; Malaysia: Shah Alam; Indonesia: Bekasi, West Java (HIM); Iran: Savojbolagh, Alborz (Mammut Group)
- Designer: Zheming Liu

Body and chassis
- Class: Mid-size crossover SUV
- Body style: 5-door SUV
- Layout: Front-engine, front-wheel-drive or four-wheel-drive
- Platform: T1X platform
- Related: Exeed Yaoguang

Powertrain
- Engine: Petrol: 2.0 L Acteco F4J20 turbo I4; 2.0 L Acteco SQRD4T20 turbo I4
- Electric motor: Permanent magnet synchronous reluctance (PHEV)
- Transmission: 8-speed automatic; 7-speed dual-clutch
- Hybrid drivetrain: Plug-in hybrid
- Battery: 34.46 kWh LFP CATL
- Range: 1,400 km (870 mi) CLTC (PHEV)
- Electric range: 210 km (130 mi) CLTC (PHEV)

Dimensions
- Wheelbase: 2,820 mm (111.0 in)
- Length: 4,820 mm (189.8 in); 4,850 mm (190.9 in) (Fulwin T10)
- Width: 1,930 mm (76.0 in)
- Height: 1,699 mm (66.9 in); 1,712 mm (67.4 in) (Fulwin T10)

The production version of the Chinese market Tiggo 9 was revealed at the 2023 Auto Shanghai in China. The Tiggo 9 rides on the T1X platform unibody chassis and features CDC suspension, which realizes intelligent full-sensing adjustment through stepless adjustment of suspension hardness. MacPherson struts in the front and multi-link rear suspension systems. The wheels are 20-inch size.

The interior of the Chinese market Tiggo 9 features a dual-curved screen with a 12.3-inch LCD instrument panel as the dashboard and a 12.3-inch central control screen curved towards the driver. The digital functionalities of the infotainment system are powered by a Qualcomm Snapdragon 8155 chip. For the audio system, the Tiggo 9 is equipped with a 14-speaker Sony surround sound system.

Under the Chery Fulwin product series, Chery also markets this model in China as the Chery Fulwin T10 (Chinese: 奇瑞风云T10; pinyin: Qíruì Fēngyún T10). The Fulwin T10 was launched to the market in April 2024. It was initially introduced as the Fulwin T9 in 2023, before the name was transferred to a smaller model.

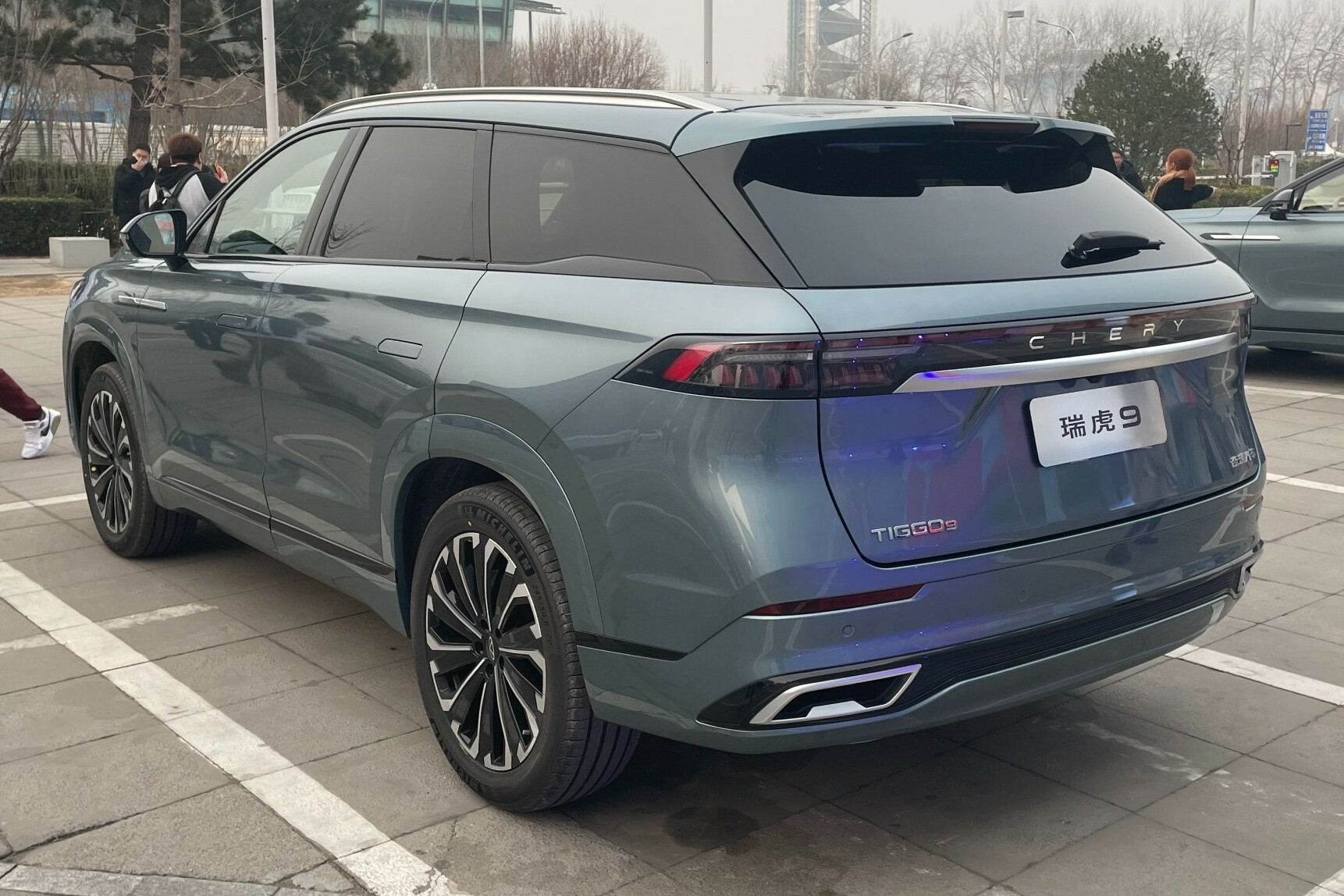
Rear view

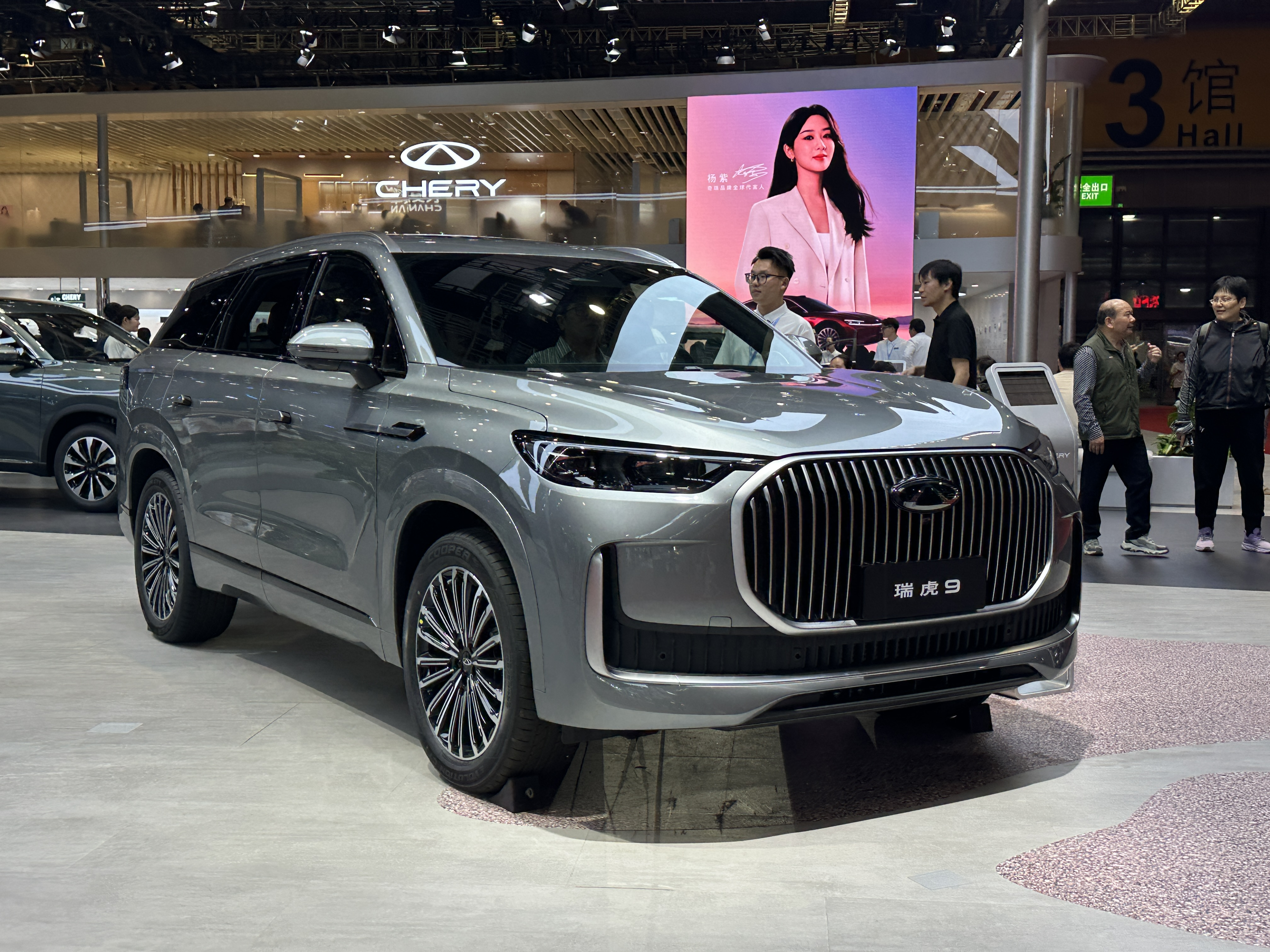
Chery Tiggo 9 2024 (facelift)

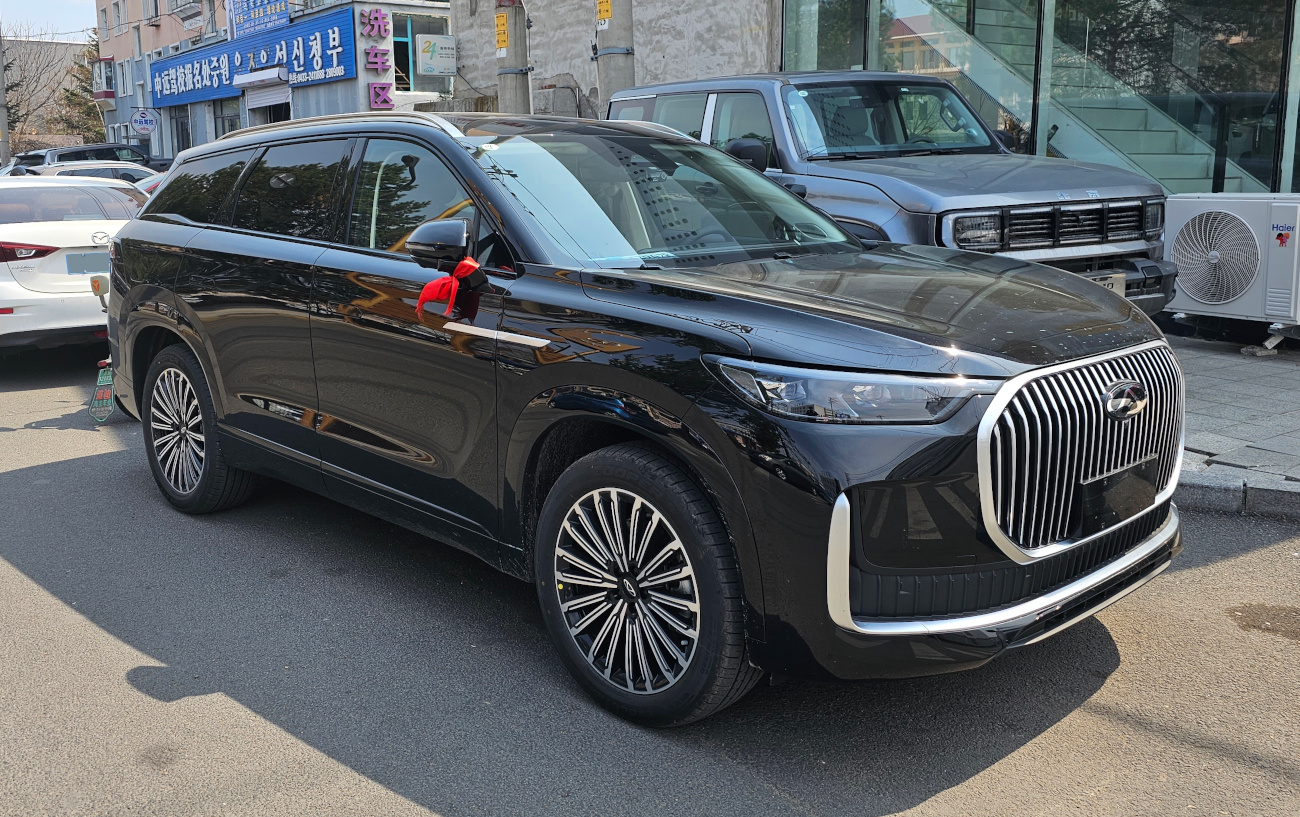
Chery Tiggo 9 C-DM

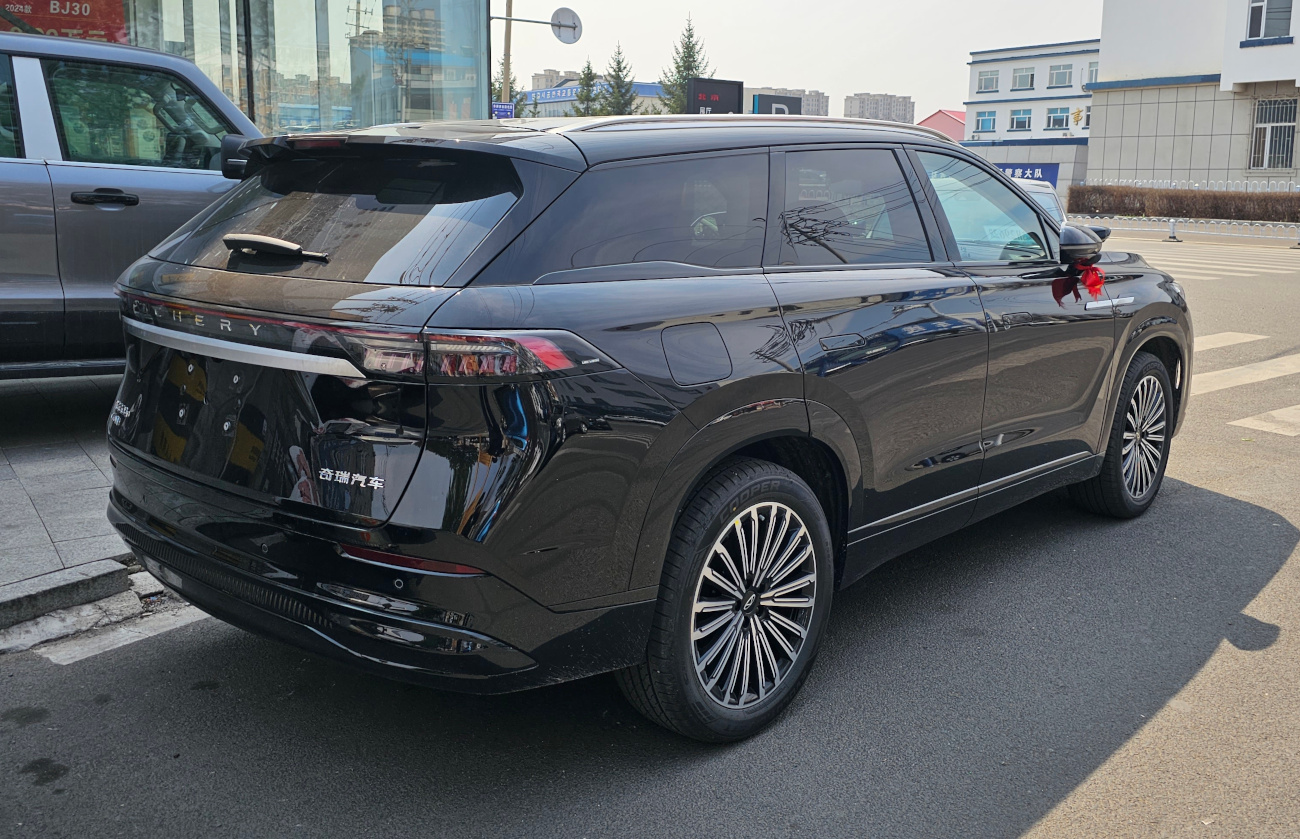
Rear view

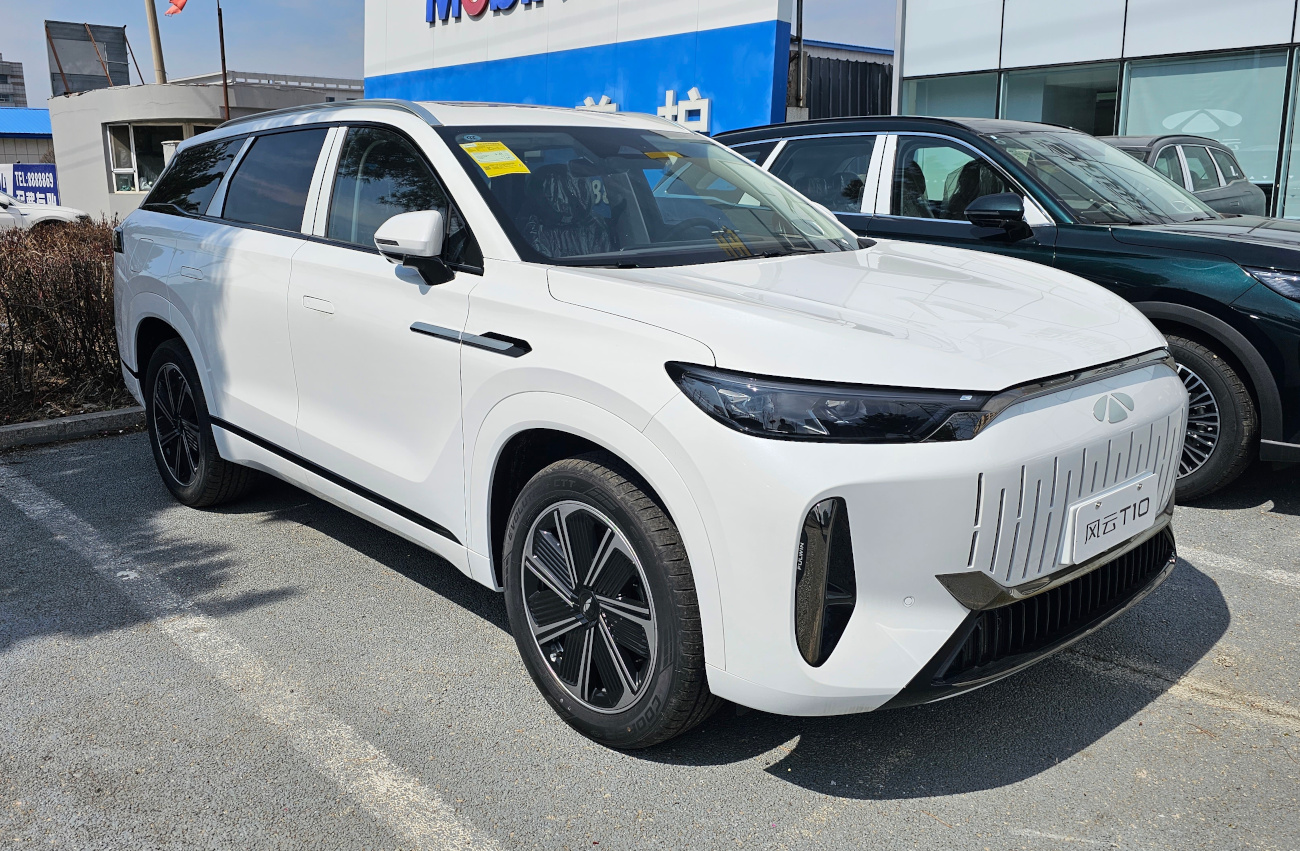
Chery Fulwin T10

=== Powertrain ===
The engine of the Tiggo 9 is a Kunpeng Power 2.0-litre TGDi inline-four turbocharged petrol engine that produces 261 hp (195 kW; 265 PS) and 400 N⋅m (295 lb⋅ft; 41 kg⋅m) of torque. The engine is mated to an Aisin eight-speed automatic transmission with paddle shifters and powers all four wheels. The top speed of the Tiggo 9 is 205 km/h (127 mph), with a combined fuel consumption of 7.7 L/100 km (13.0 km/L; 36.7 mpg_{‑imp}; 30.5 mpg_{‑US}). A 2.0-litre turbo PHEV Kunpeng Super Intelligent Hybrid version of the Tiggo 9 would also be available, with a 0–100-kilometre-per-hour (0–62 mph) acceleration in 4.5 seconds and a CLTC range of 1,300 kilometres (808 mi). The battery of the Tiggo 9 may be recharged from 30% to 80% in 18 minutes.

=== 2026 (facelift) ===
The Tiggo 9 received a major facelift in 2026 featuring restyled front and rear ends and a brand new interior. The update also introduces a new SQRF4J20C 2.0 liter turbo inline-4 engine with a maximum power output of 261hp（192kW） and 400N·m.

Chery Tiggo 9 2026 (facelift)

Rear view

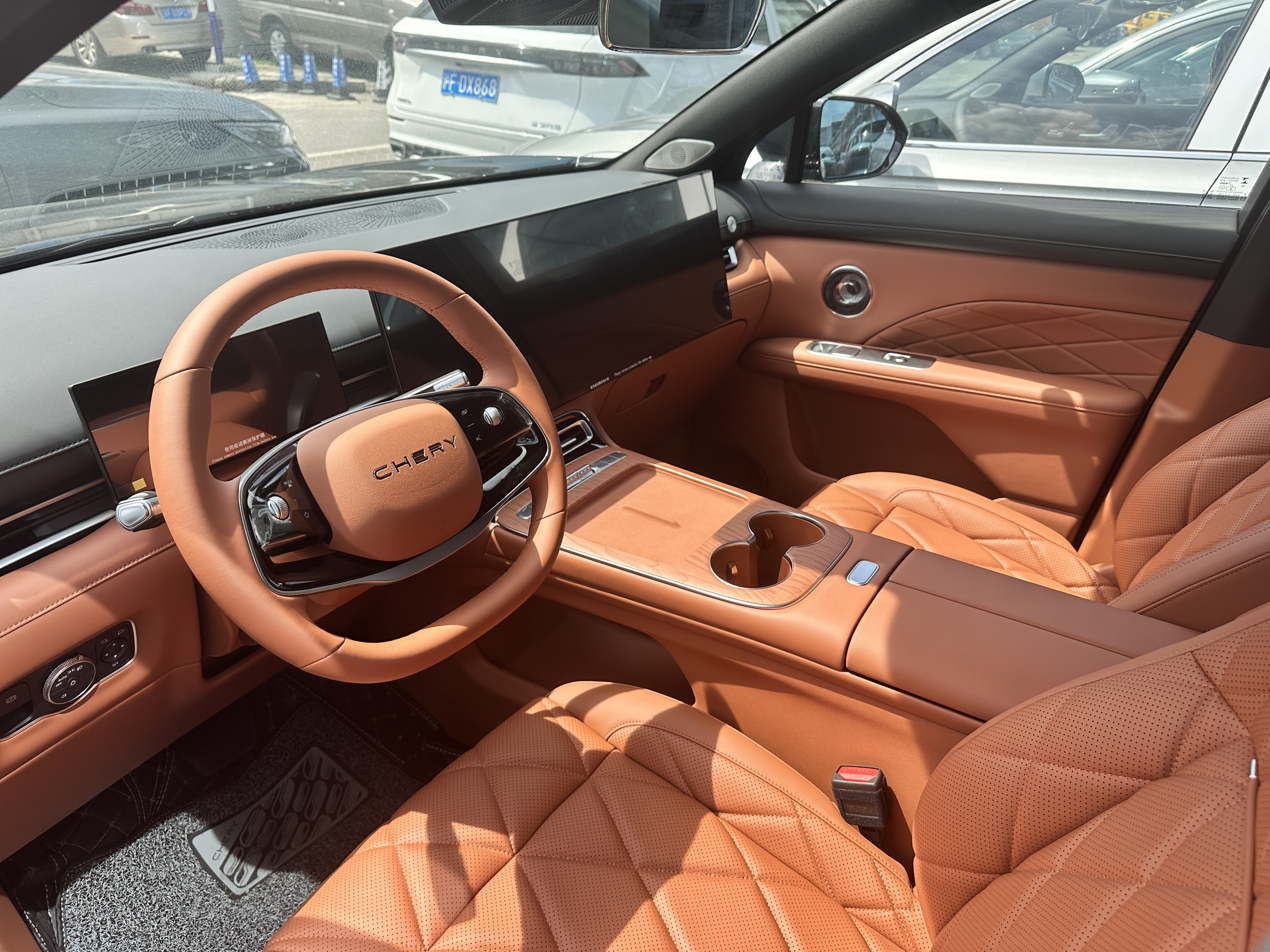
Interior

=== Jaecoo J8 ===
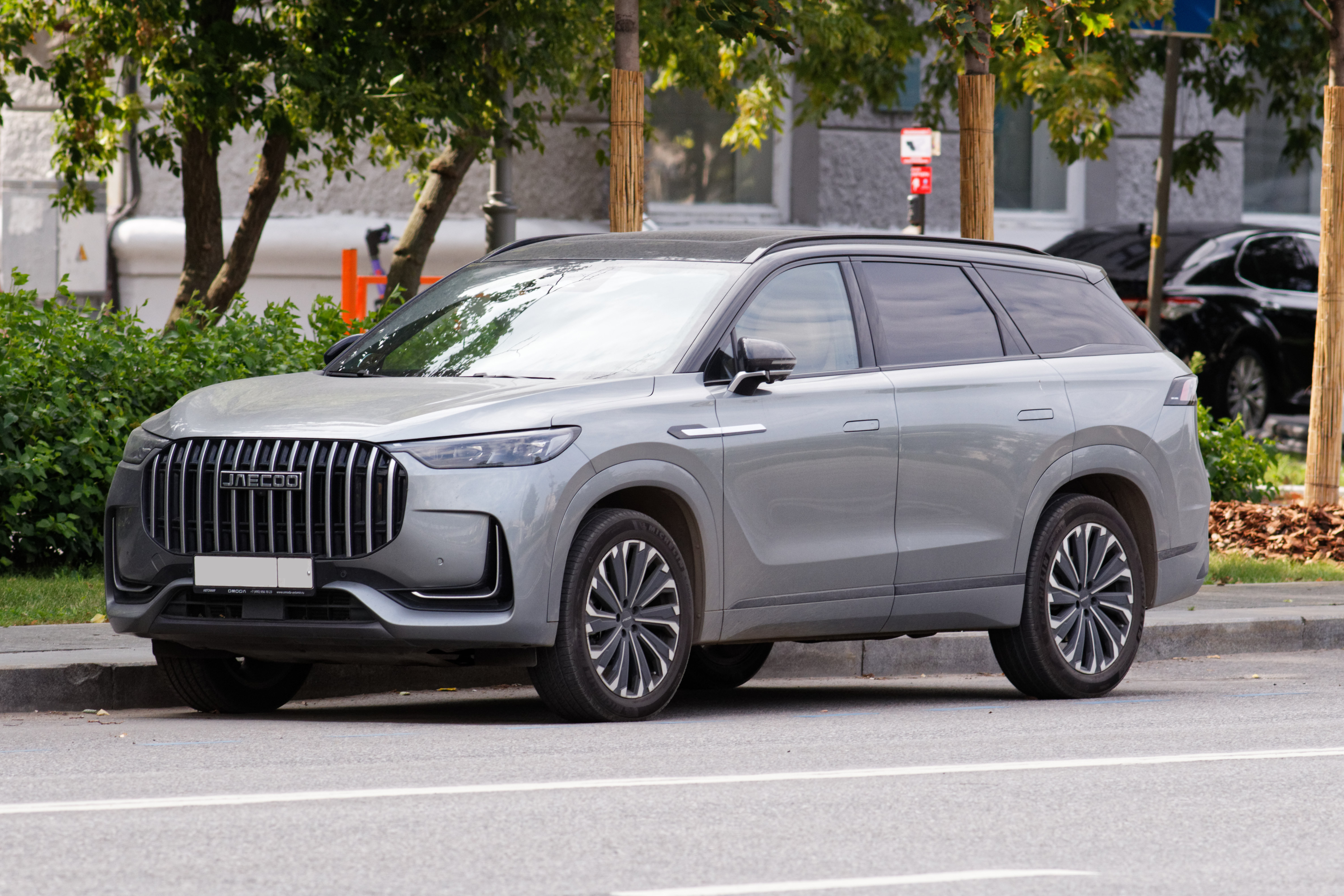
Jaecoo J8

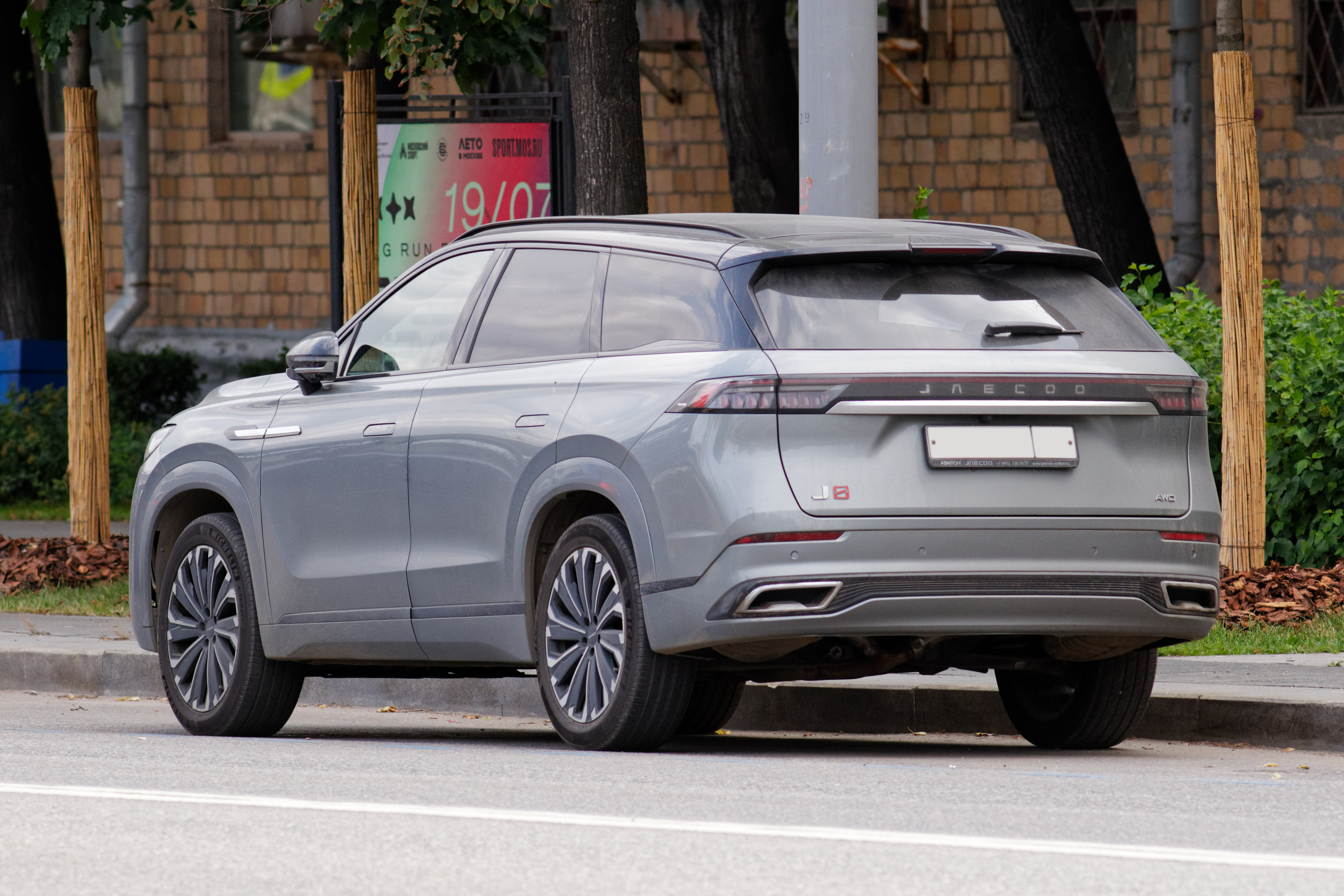
Rear view

The Chinese market Tiggo 9 for export markets were initially introduced as the Jaecoo 9, but later renamed to Jaecoo J8 or Jaecoo 8. The Jaecoo J8/8 made its global debut in Qatar in October 2023.

== Global version ==
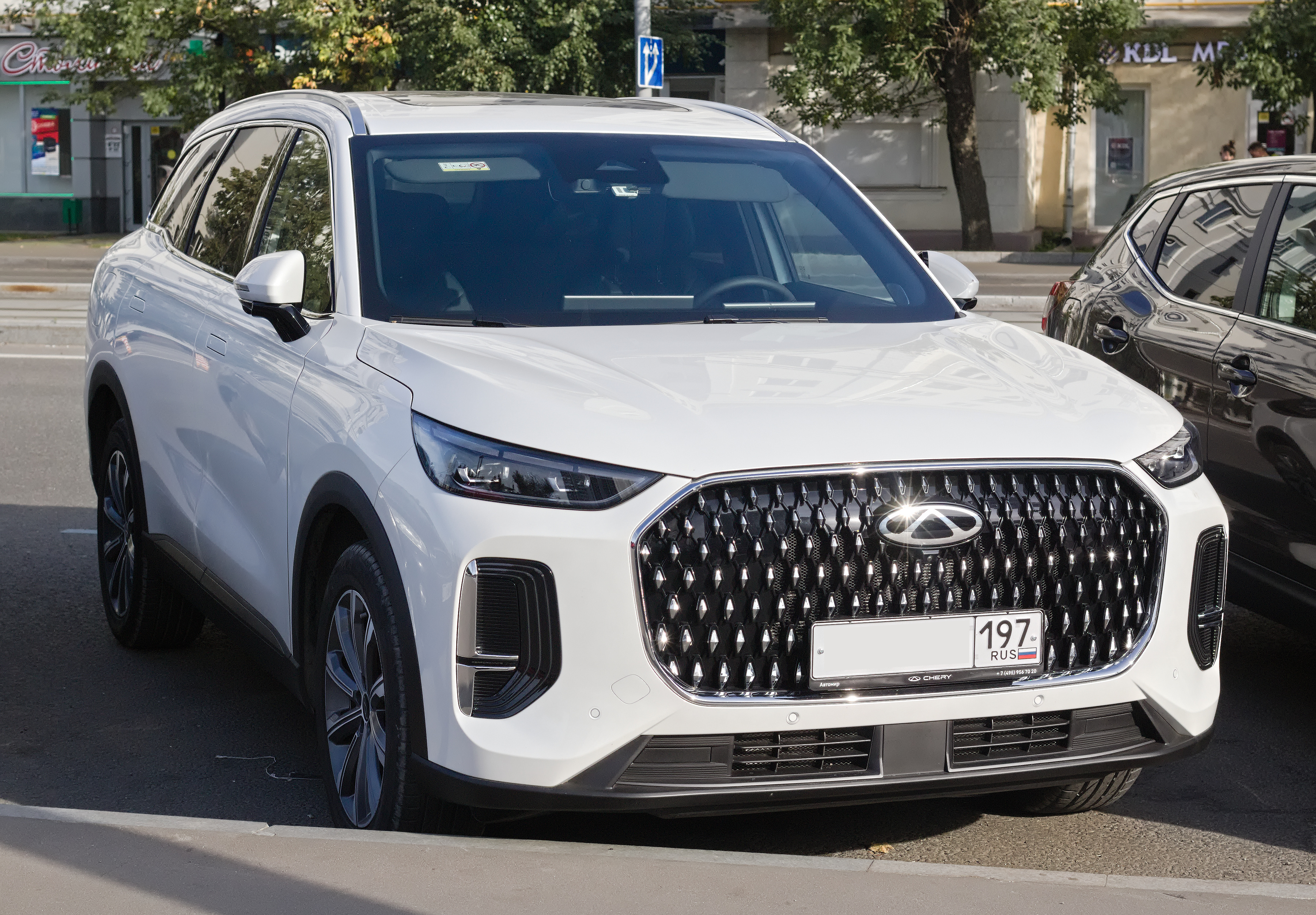
Chery Tiggo 9 (global)

The global market Tiggo 9 was introduced at the Beijing Auto Show in April 2024. Slightly smaller than the Chinese market Tiggo 9, the model is rebranded from the Chery Tiggo 8L (until September 2025), Chery Tiggo 9X (since September 2025) and Chery Fulwin T9 in China with a revised front end design.

== Sales ==
Year	China			
Year	Tiggo 9	C-DM	Total	Fulwin T10
2023	31,351	—	31,351	—
2024	54,870	4,941	59,811	4,534
2025	35,696	8,402	44,098	2,257
