= Exeed Yaoguang =

Mid-size crossover SUV

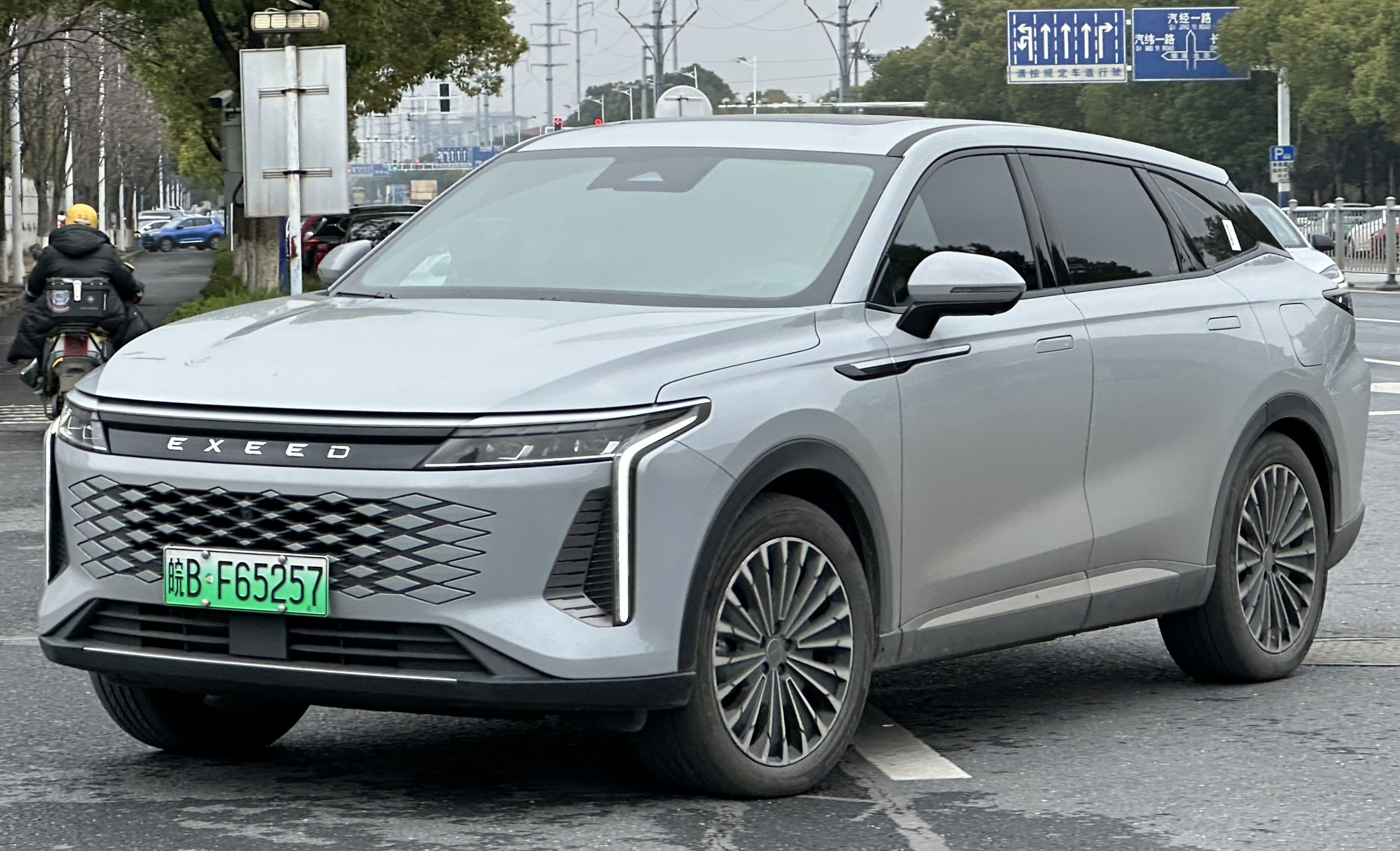
- Exeed Yaoguang C-DM

Overview
- Manufacturer: Exeed (Chery)
- Model code: M38T
- Also called: Exeed RX (Russia); Exeed EX6 (China, 2026–present); Omoda C9/9; Xtrim MX (Iran)
- Production: 2022–present
- Assembly: China: Qingdao, Shandong; Egypt: 6th of October City (EGA); Malaysia: Shah Alam, Selangor; Iran: Bam, Kerman Province (MVM)

Body and chassis
- Class: Mid-size crossover SUV
- Body style: 5-door coupe SUV
- Layout: Front-engine, front-wheel drive; Front-engine, all-wheel drive
- Platform: M3X
- Related: Exeed TX; Chery Tiggo 9

Powertrain
- Engine: Petrol: 2.0 L Acteco F4J20C I4 turbo; Petrol-plug-in hybrid: 1.5 L Acteco SQRH4J15 I4 turbo
- Electric motor: 2× permanent magnet
- Power output: 195 kW (261 hp; 265 PS) (petrol); 449 kW (601 hp; 610 PS) (C-DM PHEV)
- Transmission: 7-speed DCT; 3-speed DHT
- Hybrid drivetrain: Plug-in hybrid (C-DM)
- Battery: 19.43 or 34.46 kWh CATL M3P LFP
- Range: 98 km (61 mi) (19.43 kWh); 182–195 km (113–121 mi) (34.46 kWh)

Dimensions
- Wheelbase: 2,815 mm (110.8 in)
- Length: 4,781 mm (188.2 in)
- Width: 1,920 mm (75.6 in)
- Height: 1,671 mm (65.8 in)
- Kerb weight: 2,270 kg (5,000 lb)

The Exeed Yaoguang (Chinese: 星途瑶光; pinyin: xīng tú yáo guāng; lit. 'nacre shine') or RX for export markets is a mid-size crossover SUV produced by Exeed, a subsidiary of the Chery brand. The Yaoguang is also sold as the Omoda C9/9 in export markets like Africa, Asia and Europe.

== Overview ==
The design of the Yaoguang was first previewed by the Exeed Stellar Concept (Yaoguang, 瑶光 Concept in Chinese) unveiled during 2021 Auto Shanghai. A version of the design closer to production was the unveiled in May 2022 as the Exeed AtlantiX Concept. The final production car was launched in February 2023.

The Yaoguang is based on the M3X platform developed by Chery with Magna International shared with the slightly smaller Exeed TX from 2017.

The interior of the Exeed Yaoguang features a 24.6-inch curved dual screen, composed of two 12.3-inch screens powered by a Qualcomm Snapdragon 8155 chip, along with a head-up display. Additional features include a panoramic sunroof and a sound system with 14 Sony speakers. The backrest of the rear seat can be adjusted electrically by 7 degrees, while the driver's seat offers ventilation and heating, along with an electrically adjustable footrest and a built-in headrest audio system. The co-pilot seat is also electrically adjustable, providing a footrest and supporting five modes of back massage. In terms of driving assistance systems, the Exeed Yaoguang offers level 2.5 driving assistance system that supports 21 basic and 11 advanced driving assistance functions.

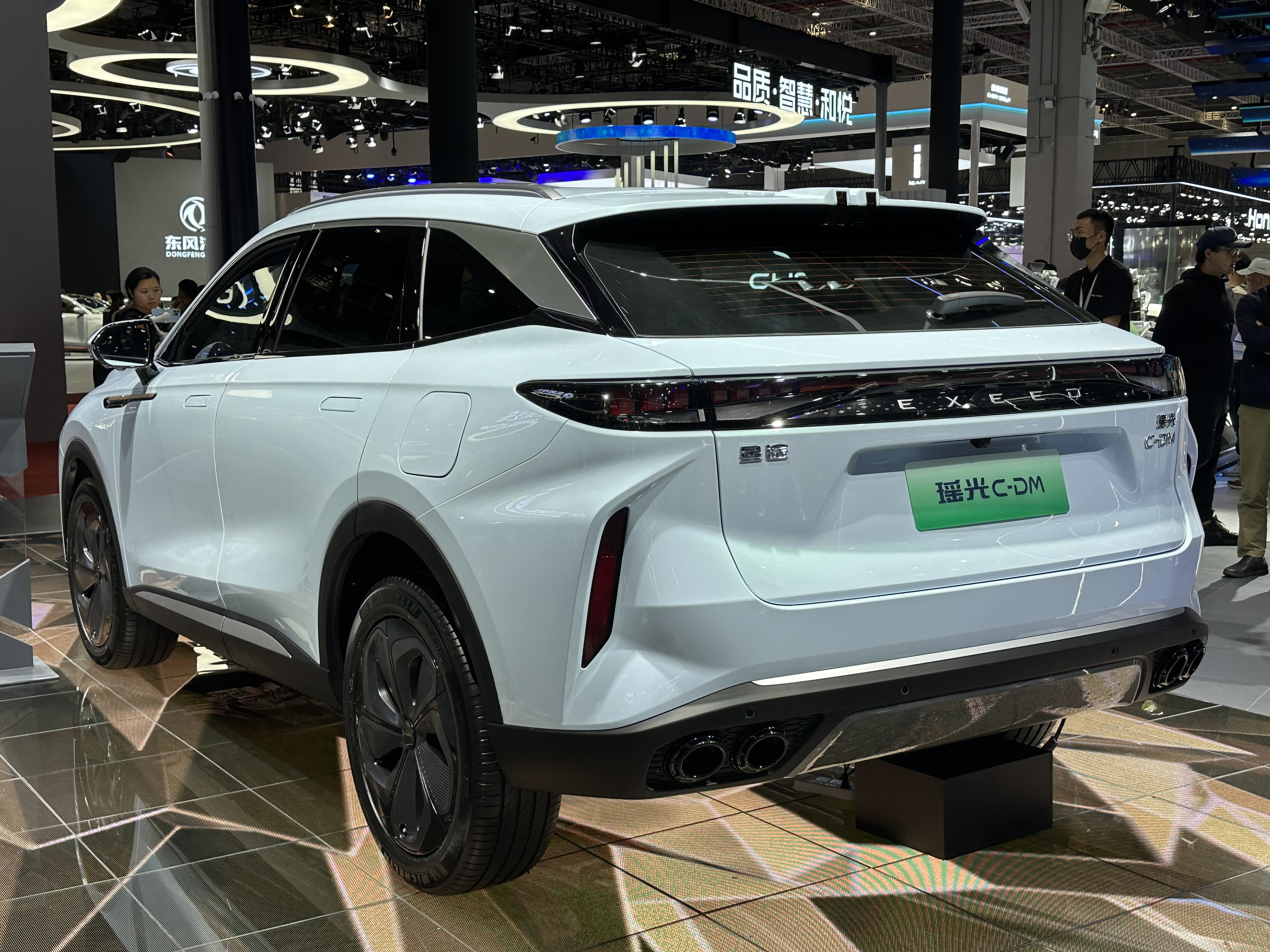
Rear view

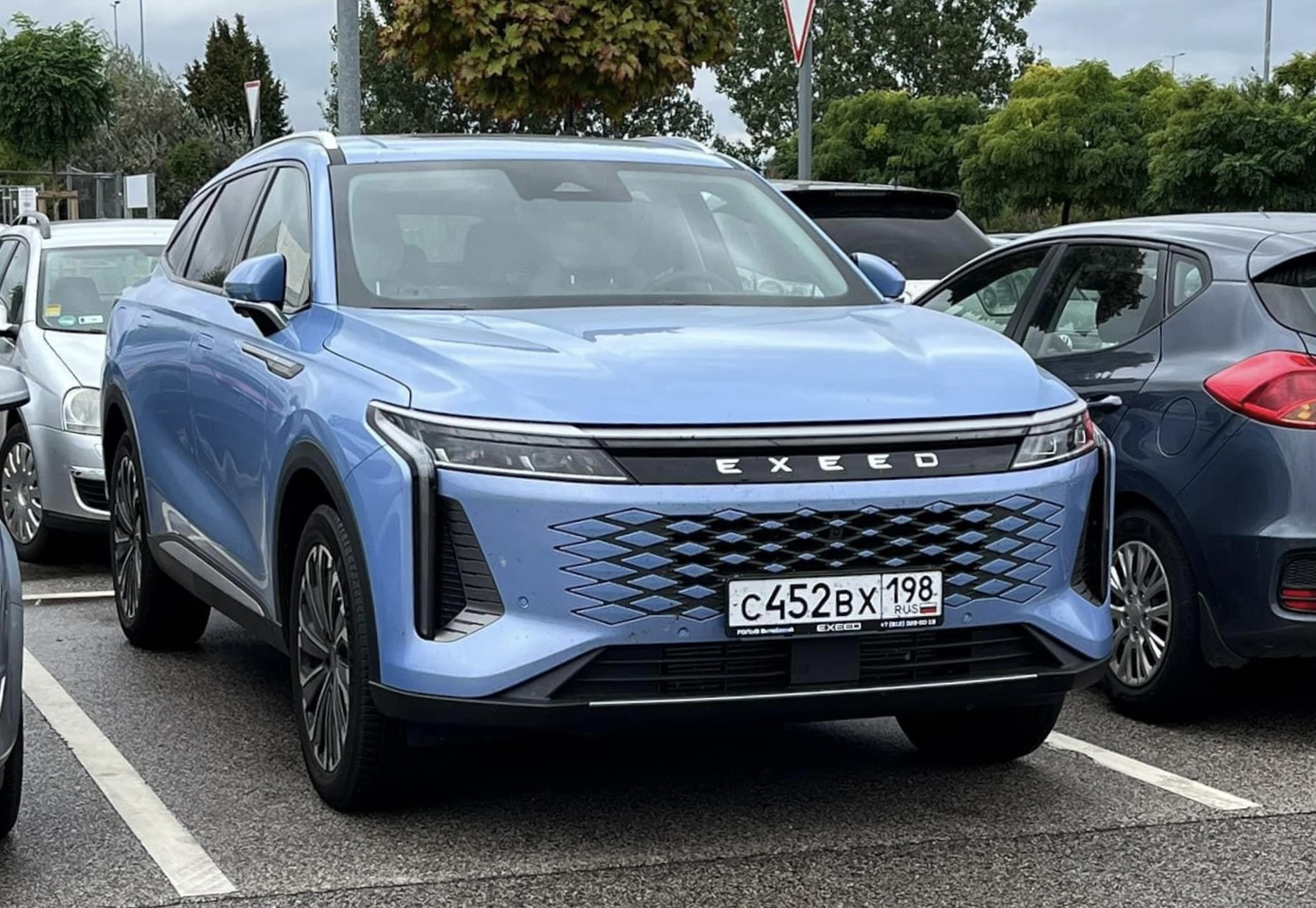
Exeed RX

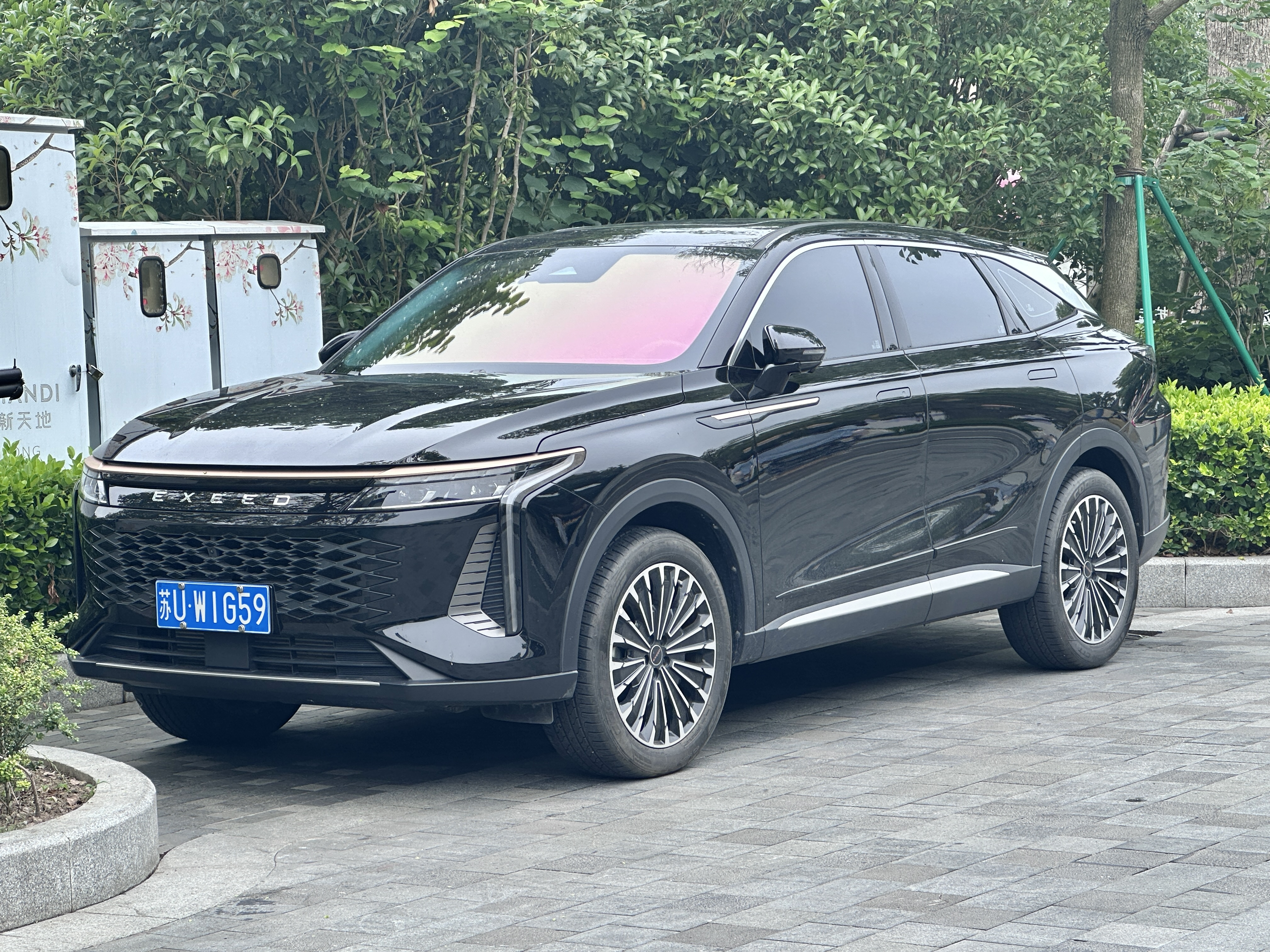
Exeed Yaoguang (petrol version)

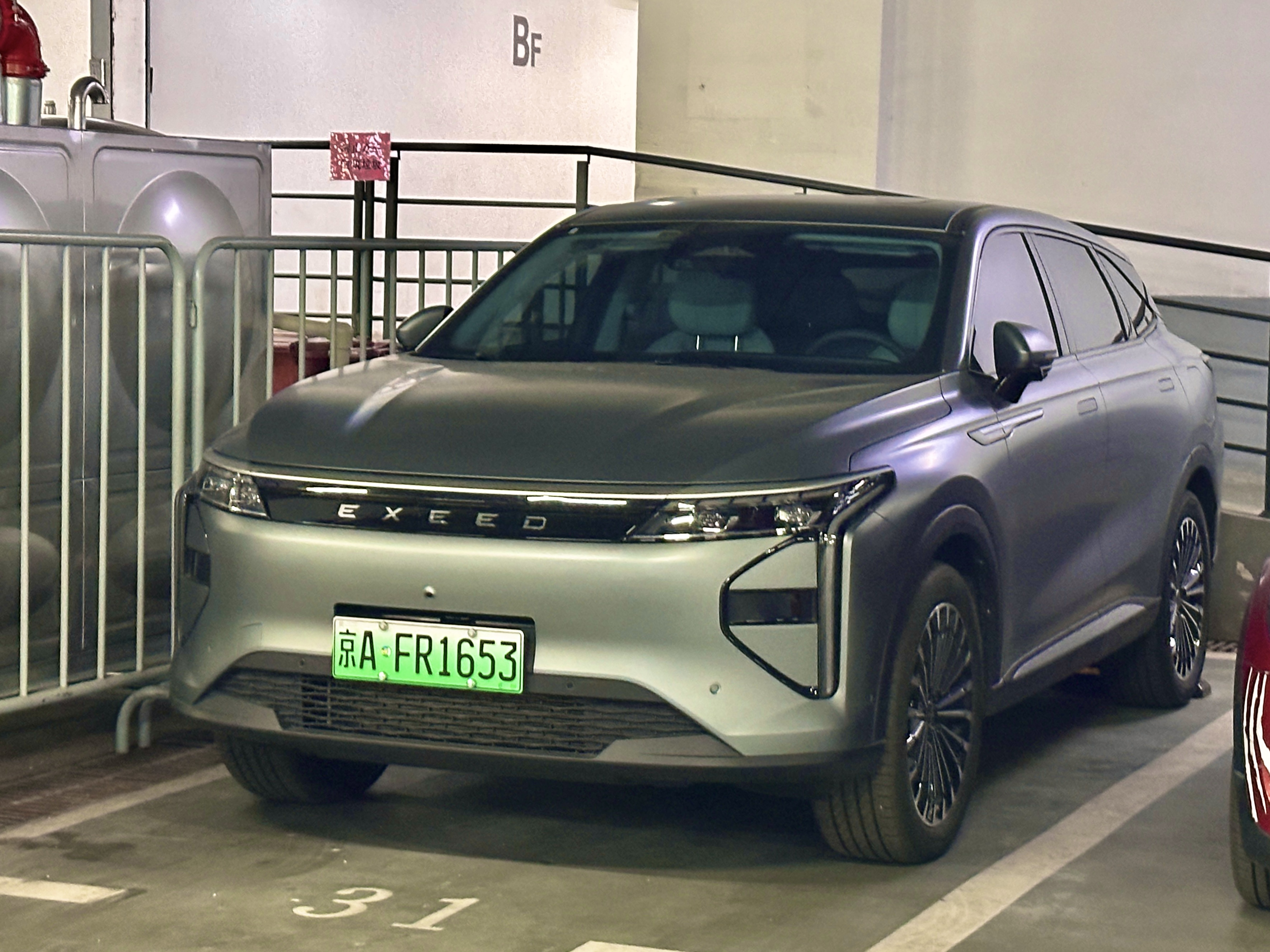
Exeed Yaoguang C-DM AWD

== Powertrain ==
The Exeed Yaoguang is powered by a 2.0-litre TGDI turbo engine that produces 261 hp and 400 Nm, mated to a 7-speed wet dual-clutch gearbox. The Yaoguang comes in two-wheel and four-wheel drive models, with a WLTC fuel consumption of 7.6L/100 km for urban driving and 8.1L/100 km for highways with the drag coefficient being as low as 0.326Cd. The 0 to 100 km/h acceleration time is 8.6 seconds. Seven driving modes would be available and a C-DM PHEV version was launched later.

The C-DM AWD version is equipped with a 3-motor hybrid system, with a 1.5-litre turbo engine producing a maximum output of 105 kW plus the 340 kW from the electric motors, resulting in a combined 445 kW output. The CLTC pure electric range is 182 km with the gearbox being a 3-speed DHT. 0–100 km/h acceleration is 4.9 seconds.

== Markets ==
=== Australia ===
The Omoda 9 was launched in Australia on 21 July 2025, in the sole Virtue SHS variant, powered by the 1.5-litre turbocharged petrol plug-in hybrid (SHS) powertrain with all-wheel drive.

=== Europe ===
The Omoda 9 was released in Europe, with sales started in the UK in April 2025. For Europe, it is only with the 1.5-litre turbocharged petrol plug-in hybrid (SHS) powertrain.

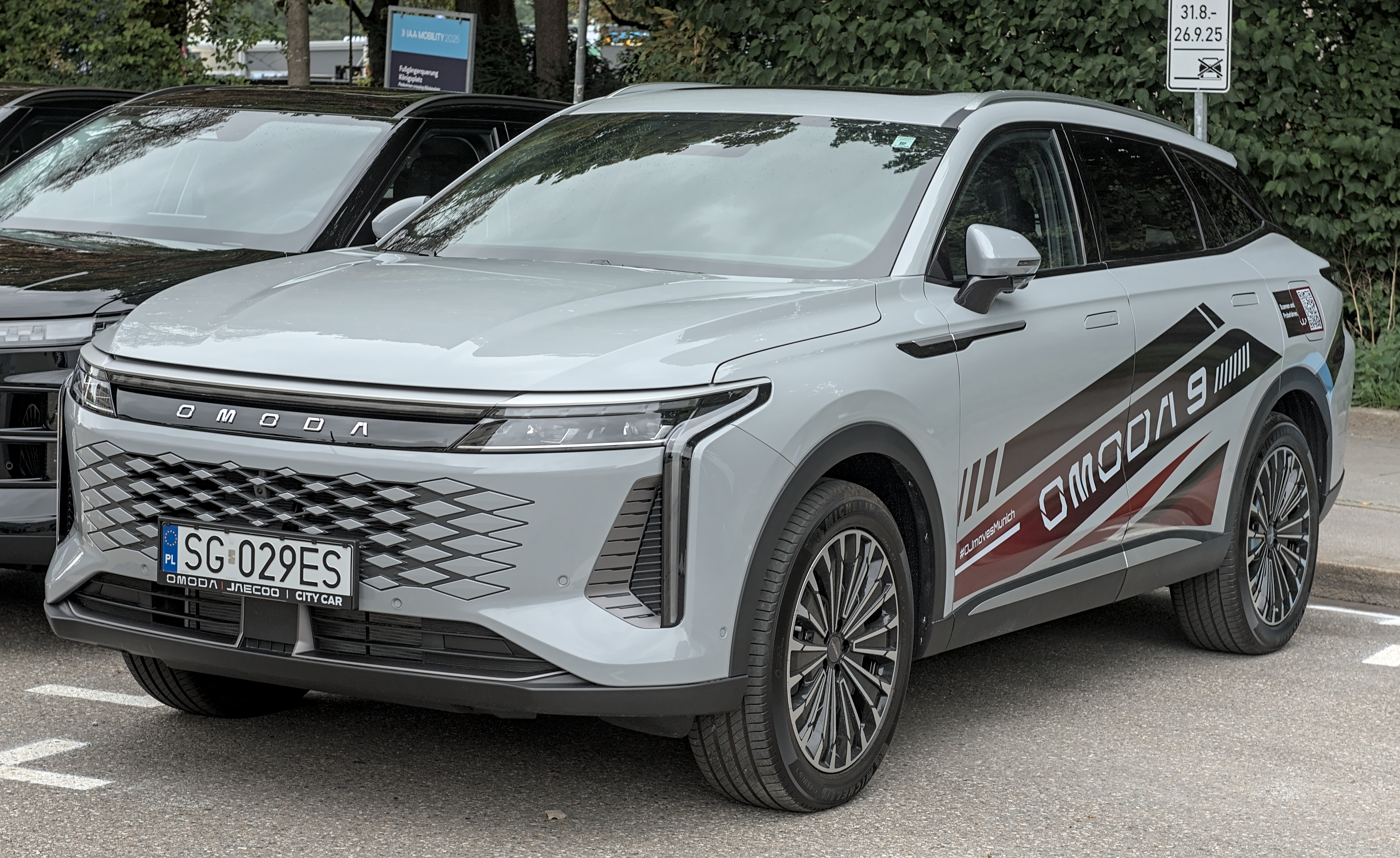
Omoda 9

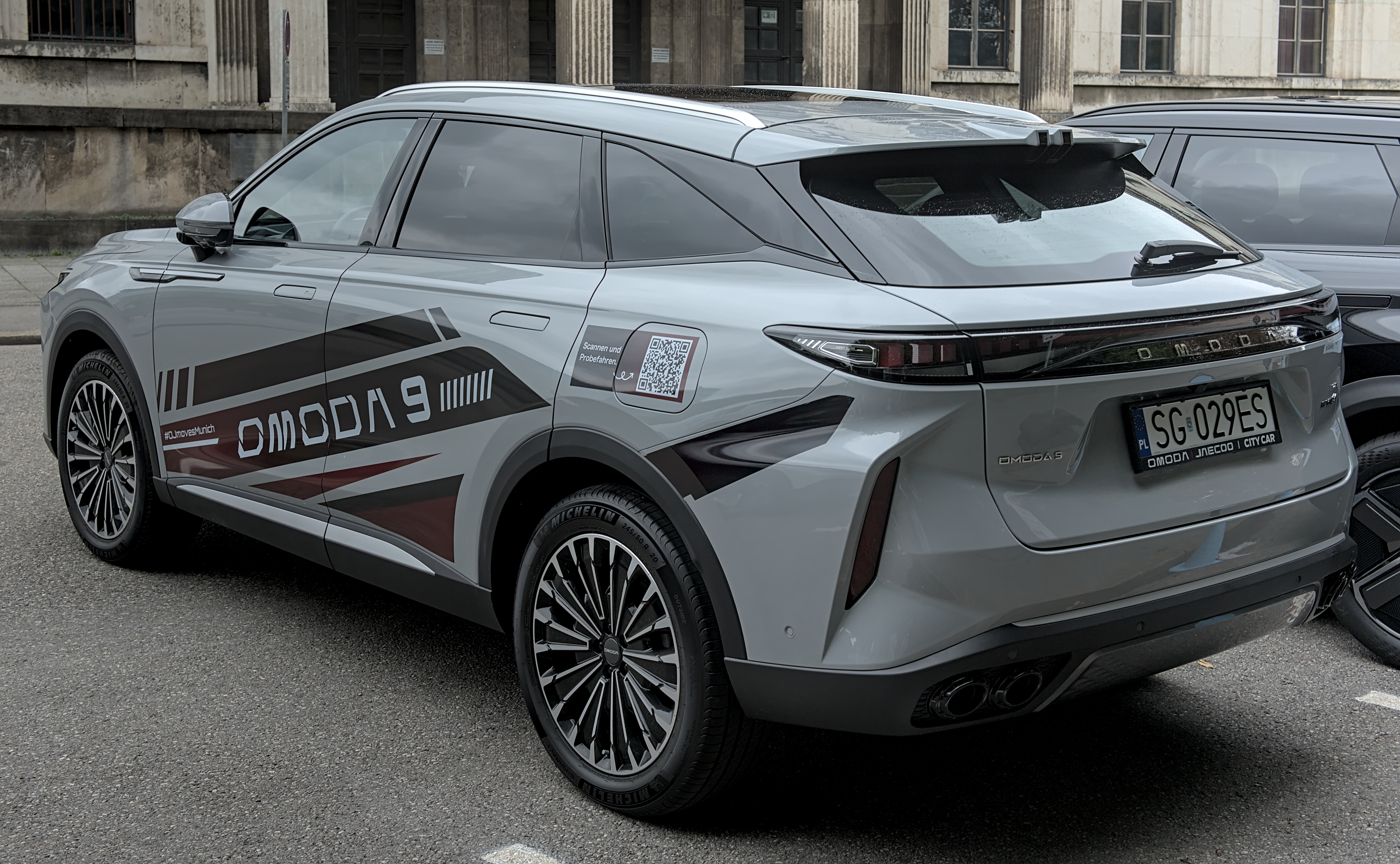
Rear view

=== Malaysia ===
The Omoda C9 was previewed in Malaysia in September 2024 and was launched on 6 December 2024 under the Jaecoo brand. Locally assembled in Shah Alam plant, it is available with 2WD and AWD variants, both variants are powered by a 2.0-litre turbocharged petrol engine.

In March 2026, the PHEV petrol plug-in hybrid model with all-wheel drive was introduced in Malaysia. The PHEV model was initially imported from China for a limited run of 50 units, followed by local assembly in the Shah Alam plant. During the same month, the Matte Black Limited Edition model powered by the 2.0-litre turbocharged petrol was also made available.

=== New Zealand ===
The Omoda C9 went on sale in New Zealand on 3 July 2025, in the sole Virtue variant, powered by the 1.5-litre turbocharged petrol plug-in hybrid (SHS) powertrain with all-wheel drive.

=== South Africa ===
The Omoda C9 was launched in South Africa on 11 October 2024, with two trim levels: Inspire (2WD) and Explore (AWD), it is powered by a 2.0-litre turbocharged petrol engine (400T), and comes with an Aisin 8-speed automatic transmission. The PHEV petrol plug-in hybrid model with all-wheel drive was launched in South Africa on 9 June 2025 for the Explore trim.

== Safety ==
=== ANCAP ===
ANCAP test results Omoda 9 (2025, aligned with Euro NCAP)
| Test | Points | % |
|---|---|---|
| Overall: | 5 /5 stars | |
| Adult occupant: | 36.25 | 90% |
| Child occupant: | 42.81 | 88% |
| Pedestrian: | 51.44 | 81% |
| Safety assist: | 14.78 | 82% |

=== Euro NCAP ===
Euro NCAP test results Omoda 9 PHEV Premium (AWD) (LHD) (2025)
| Test | Points | % |
|---|---|---|
| Overall: | 5 /5 stars | |
| Adult occupant: | 36.2 | 90% |
| Child occupant: | 42 | 85% |
| Pedestrian: | 51.4 | 81% |
| Safety assist: | 14.5 | 80% |

== Sales ==
| Year | China | | Australia |
| Year | Yaoguang | C-DM | Australia |
|---|---|---|---|
| 2023 | 17,659 | — | |
| 2024 | 13,552 | 11,889 | |
| 2025 | 4,150 | 7,497 | 373 |
