= Exeed LX =

Subcompact luxury crossover SUV

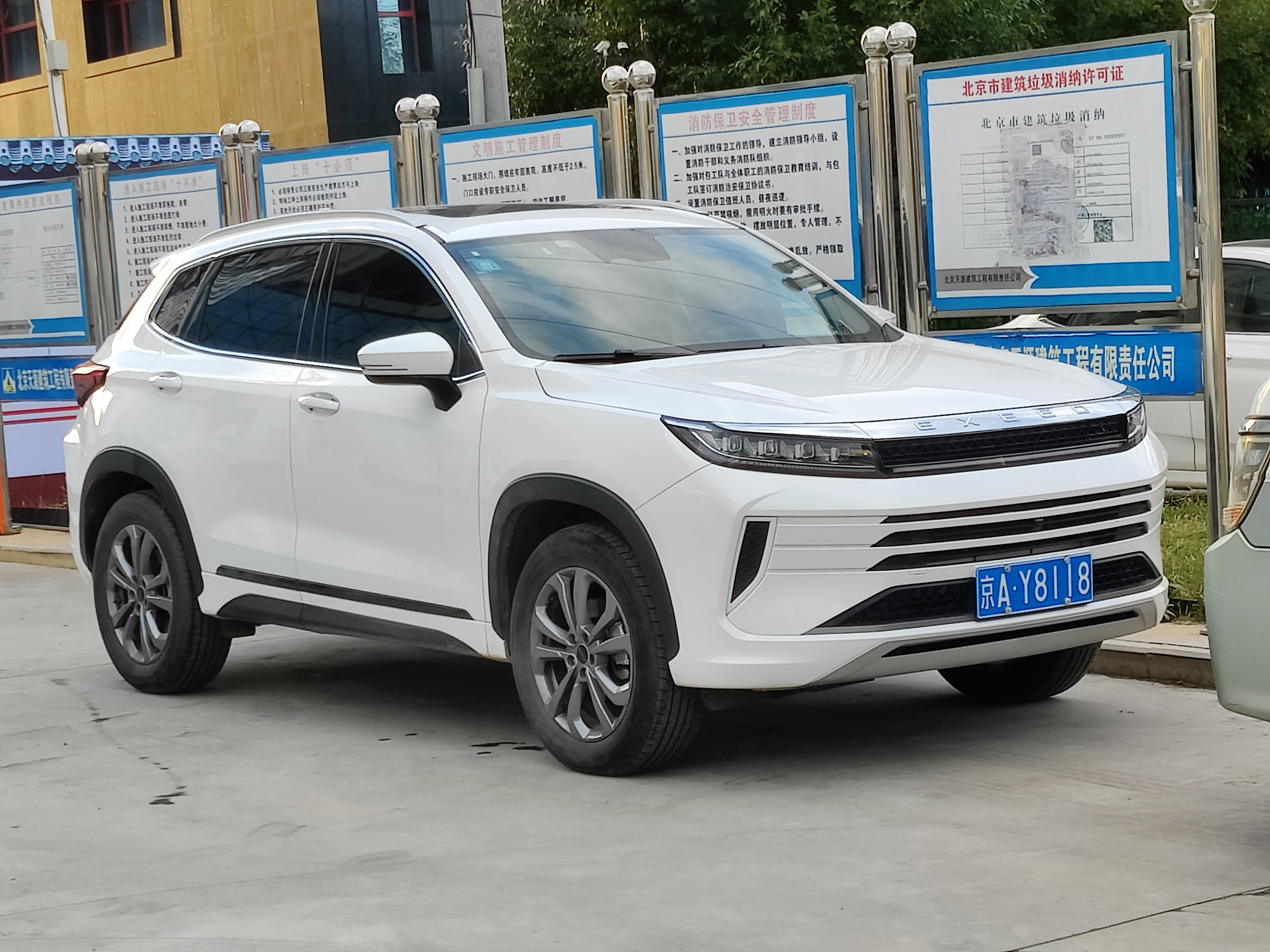

Overview
- Manufacturer: Exeed (Chery)
- Also called: Exeed Zhuifeng (China, 2021–2026); Xtrim LX/SX (Iran)
- Production: 2019–2026
- Assembly: China: Wuhu, Anhui; Brazil: Anápolis (Caoa Chery); Iran: Bam, Kerman Province (MVM)

Body and chassis
- Class: Subcompact luxury crossover SUV (C)
- Body style: 5-door SUV
- Layout: Front-engine, front-wheel-drive Front-engine, four-wheel-drive
- Platform: T1X
- Related: Chery Tiggo 7 Omoda C5

Powertrain
- Engine: Petrol: 1.5 L E4T15C I4 turbo; 1.6 L F4J16 I4 turbo
- Power output: 116–147 kW (156–197 hp; 158–200 PS)
- Transmission: 7-speed DCT; 9-speed CVT

Dimensions
- Wheelbase: 2,670 mm (105.1 in)
- Length: 4,533 mm (178.5 in)
- Width: 1,848 mm (72.8 in)
- Height: 1,699 mm (66.9 in)

The Exeed LX or Exeed Zhuifeng (Chinese: 星途追风; pinyin: xīng tú zhuī fēng) in China is a subcompact luxury crossover SUV produced by Chery under the Exeed premium brand.

== Overview ==
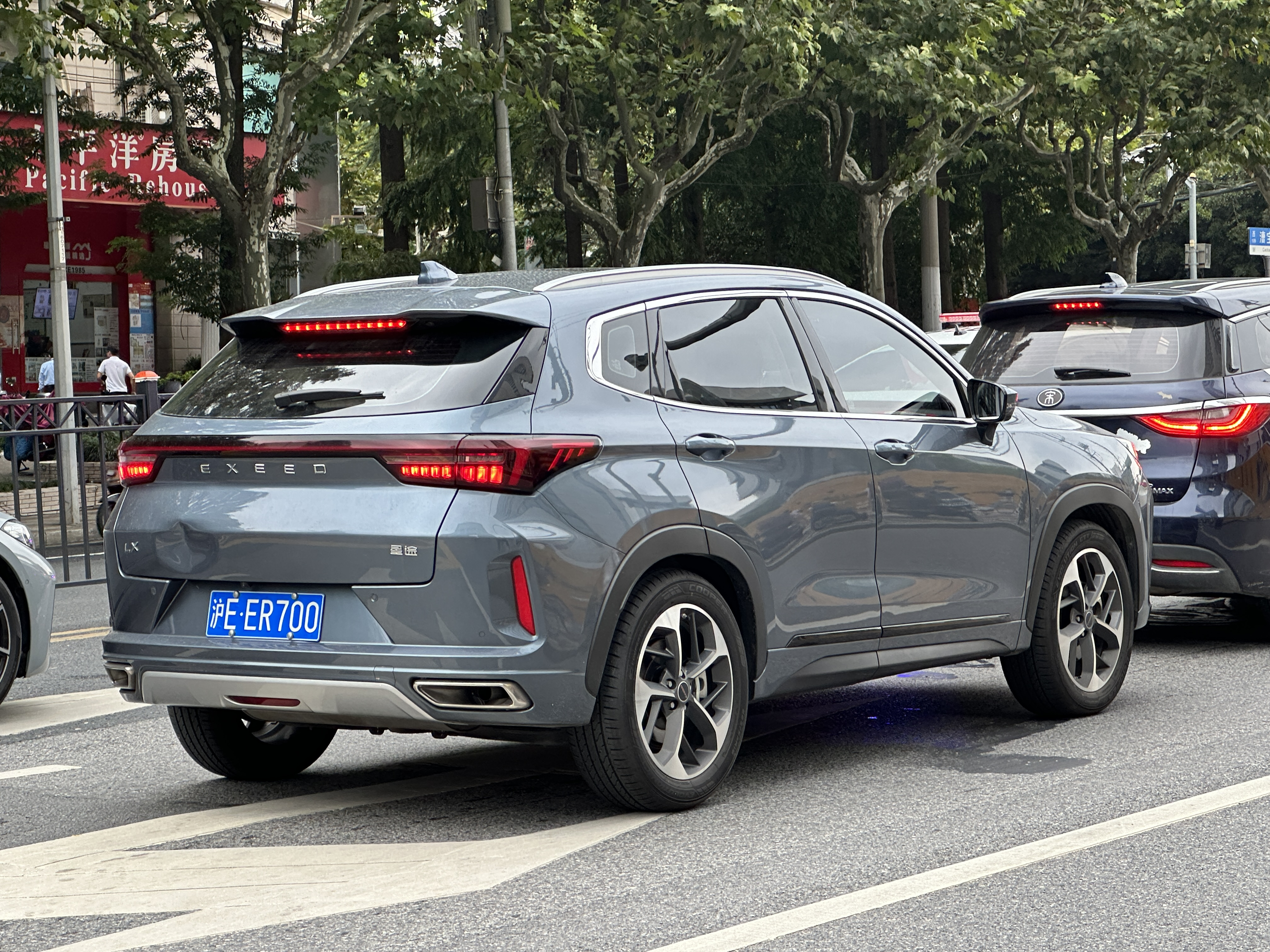
Rear view

The design of the production Exeed LX is previewed by the Exeed LX Concept car released in 2018.

In July 2019, the production Exeed LX compact crossover was revealed based on the same platform as the first generation Chery Tiggo 7 while featuring restyled front and rear ends. Exeed is the premium brand of Chery marketed towards the European market, and the LX is the second model under the brand following the Exeed TX. Interior-wise, the LX designs are completely different from Tiggo 7, with the instrument panel and multimedia screen integrated as a single set. The central console is floating and houses the gearshift knob and the digital air conditioning controls.

The Exeed LX has a length of 4,533 mm (178.5 in), a width of 1,848 mm (72.8 in), a height of 1,699 mm (66.9 in), and a wheelbase of 2,670 mm (105.1 in). The Exeed LX was launched on the Chinese car market in the fourth quarter of 2019 with pricing to start around 130,000 yuan ($18,950).

=== Exeed Zhuifeng ===
The Exeed LX received a facelift with an additional Chinese name called the Zhuifeng (追风) in August 2021 for the 2022 model year.

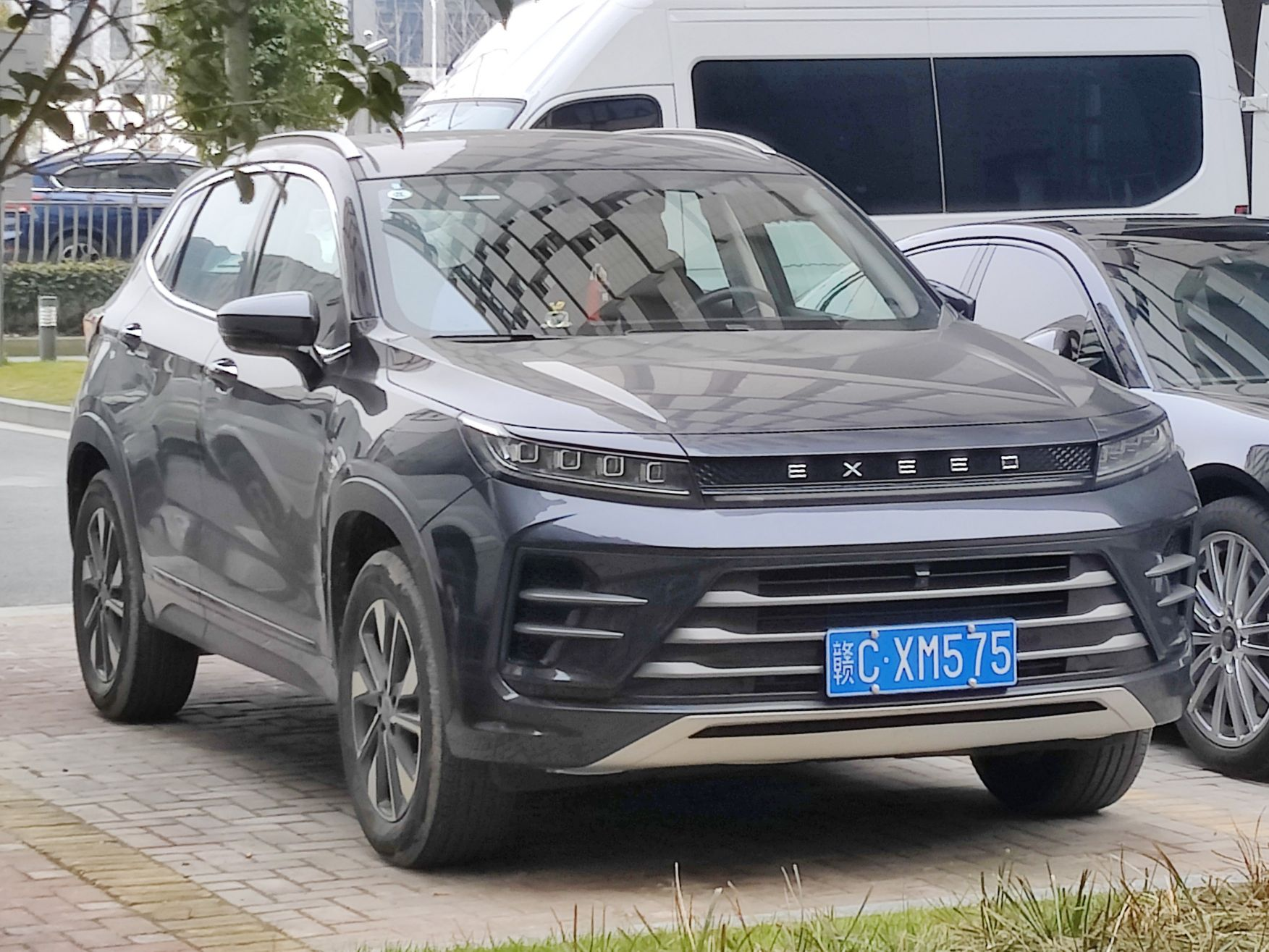
Exeed Zhuifeng

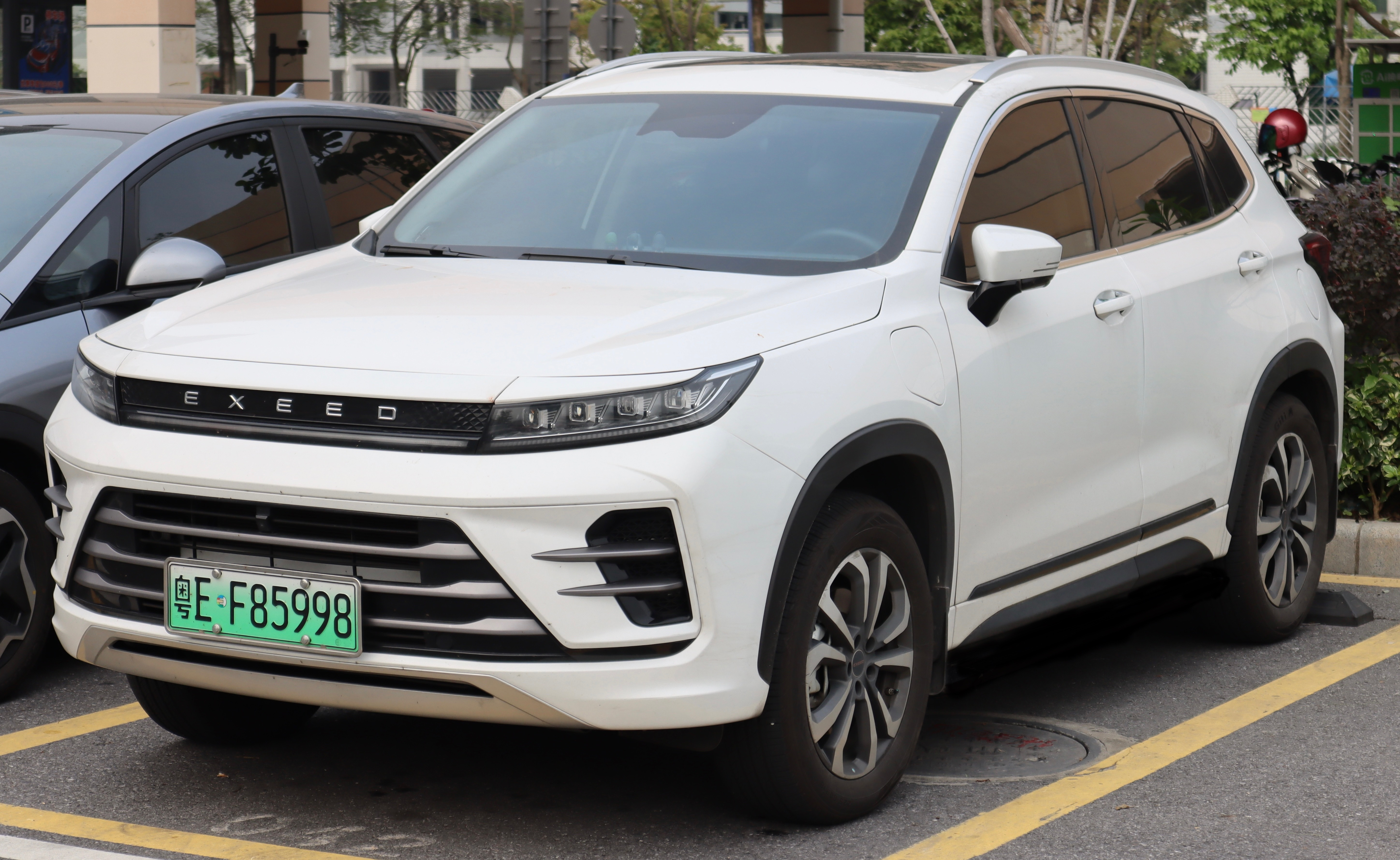
Exeed Zhuifeng ET-i

== Powertrain ==
The power of the Exeed LX comes from a 1.6-litre petrol direct injection turbo engine producing 197 hp (147 kW; 200 PS) and an estimated torque of 30 kg⋅m (294 N⋅m; 217 lb⋅ft). The transmission of the Exeed LX is an automated seven-speed dual-clutch transmission. A 1.5-litre petrol turbo engine producing 156 hp (116 kW; 158 PS) and an estimated torque of 24 kg⋅m (235 N⋅m; 174 lb⋅ft) mated to a CVT transmission with 9 simulated gears was added to the 2020 model year.

== Markets ==
=== Brazil ===
The Caoa Chery in Brazil is the producer and distributor of products from Exeed, with the first Exeed model commercialized in the Brazilian market from the first quarter of 2021. The LX crossover SUV was chosen for the debut of Exeed in Brazil due to the T1X platform and other components shared with the Tiggo 7 made in Anápolis.

=== Russia ===
The Exeed LX was launched to the Russian market in March 2022 with a 1.5-litre petrol turbo engine producing 145 hp (108 kW; 147 PS) and a CVT transmission. The four-wheel-drive version with a 1.6-litre petrol turbo engine producing 148 hp (110 kW; 150 PS) and a DCT transmission was launched in December 2022.

== Sales ==
Year	China		
Year	Zhuifeng	C-DM	Total
2023	5,976	1,160	7,136
2024	3,633	670	4,303
2025	1,829	385	2,214
