= Exeed =

Premium SUV marque by Chery

Exeed Automobile Co., Ltd.
- Product type: Subsidiary
- Current owner: Chery Automobile
- Country: China
- Introduced: September 2017; 9 years ago
- Markets: China; Russia and CIS states Middle East; South America
- Ambassador: Qin Chao (Exeed International CEO)
- Website: www.exeedinternational.com; www.exeedcars.com (China)

Exeed Automobile Co., Ltd. (Chinese: 星途; pinyin: Xīngtú) is an automotive division of premium vehicles introduced by Chinese automobile manufacturer Chery in September 2017.

In European and right-hand-drive markets, Exeed is known as Exlantix due to trademark restrictions.

== History ==
The Exeed marque was introduced on September 14, 2017, at International Motor Show Germany in Frankfurt with the TX concept vehicle, a mid-size SUV wearing Chery badges. The first Exeed-branded vehicle to be revealed is the Exeed LX concept revealed at Auto China on April 29, 2018, in Beijing.

The first production Exeed model launched was the Exeed TX/TXL mid-size SUV in March 2019. Next month in April at Auto Shanghai, a third Exeed concept vehicle was revealed, the E-IUV. In October, Exeed launched its second production vehicle, the Chery Tiggo 7-based LX compact SUV.

By the end of the year on November 22, 2019, at Auto Guangzhou, a concept vehicle, called the VX, previewing the brand's flagship SUV was revealed. The production Exeed VX full-size SUV was released in January 2020.

In February 2020, it was announced that the Exeed TXL and VX would be sold in the United States by HAAH Automotive Holdings as the Vantas TXL and VX. These models were planned to be launched in 2021. In April 2021, the Vantas brand release date was pushed back to 2022 and it was announced that the first models would be exported from China to the United States. However, later in July, HAAH filed for bankruptcy and the plans for Vantas and the company's other entry-level brand, T-GO, which planned to sell the second-gen Chery Tiggo 7, were abandoned.

In April 2021 at Auto Shanghai, Exeed revealed the marque's fifth concept SUV, the Stellar, an electric mid-size SUV.

== Vehicles ==
=== Current models ===
- Exeed Zhuifeng/LX (2019–present), compact SUV, ICE/PHEV
- Exeed TX (2019–present), mid-size SUV, ICE/EREV
  - Exeed Lingyun/TXL (2019–present), an extended version of the TX
- Exeed Lanyue/VX (2020–present), full-size SUV, ICE/PHEV
- Exeed Yaoguang/RX (2023–present), mid-size SUV, ICE/PHEV
  - Exeed EX6 (2026–present), mid-size SUV, BEV/EREV
- Exeed ET5 (2025–present), mid-size SUV, BEV/EREV
- Exeed Sterra ES (2024–present), full-size sedan, BEV/EREV
- Exeed Sterra ET/EX7 (2024–present), mid-size SUV, BEV/EREV

=== Planned ===
- Exeed ES7 GT (Q4 2026), shooting brake, EREV
- Exeed ES8 (Q4 2026), mid-size wagon, BEV
- Exeed ET8 (Q4 2026), mid-size SUV, BEV/EREV
- Exeed ET9 (Q3 2026), full-size SUV, BEV/EREV
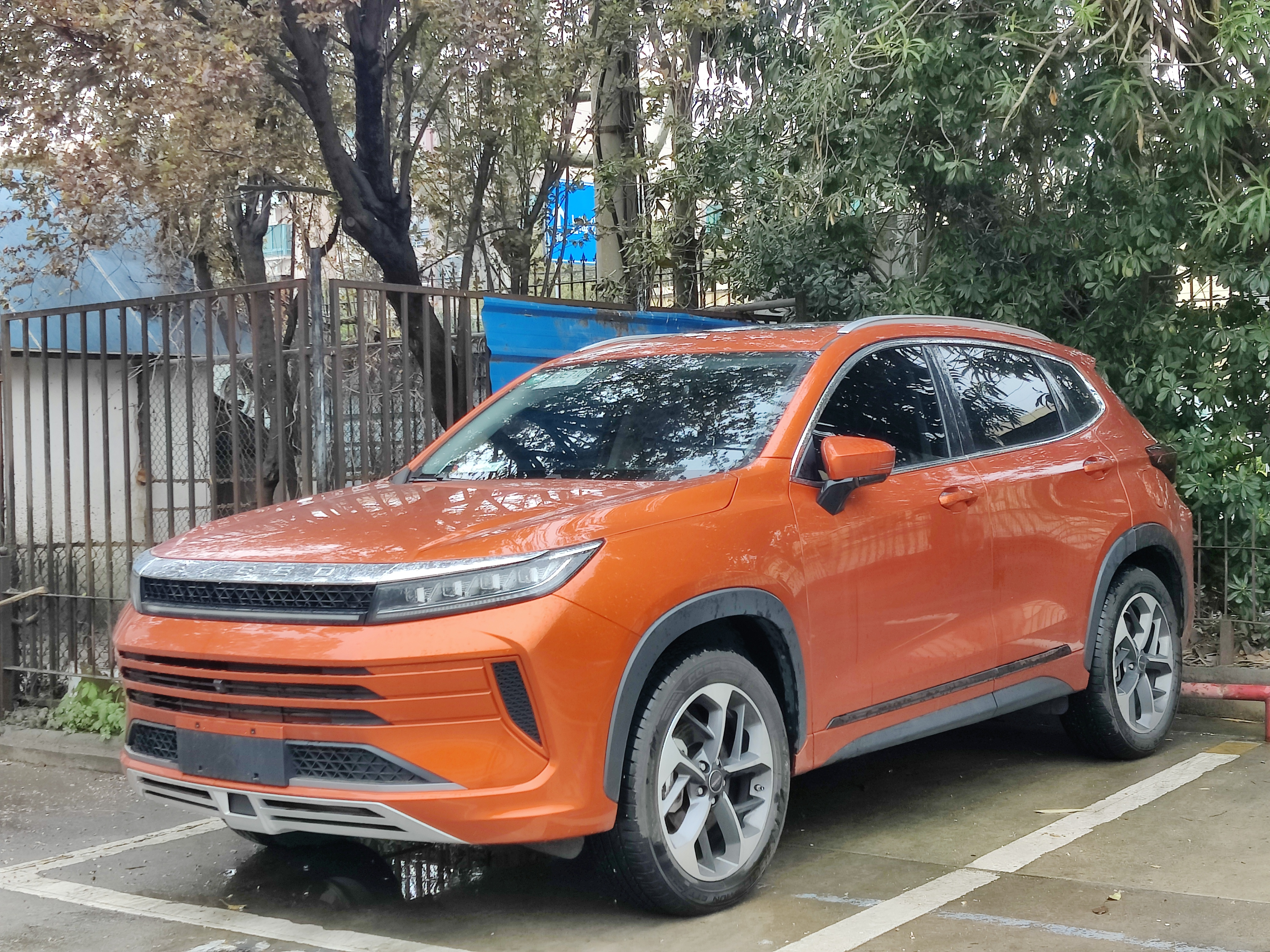
Exeed LX

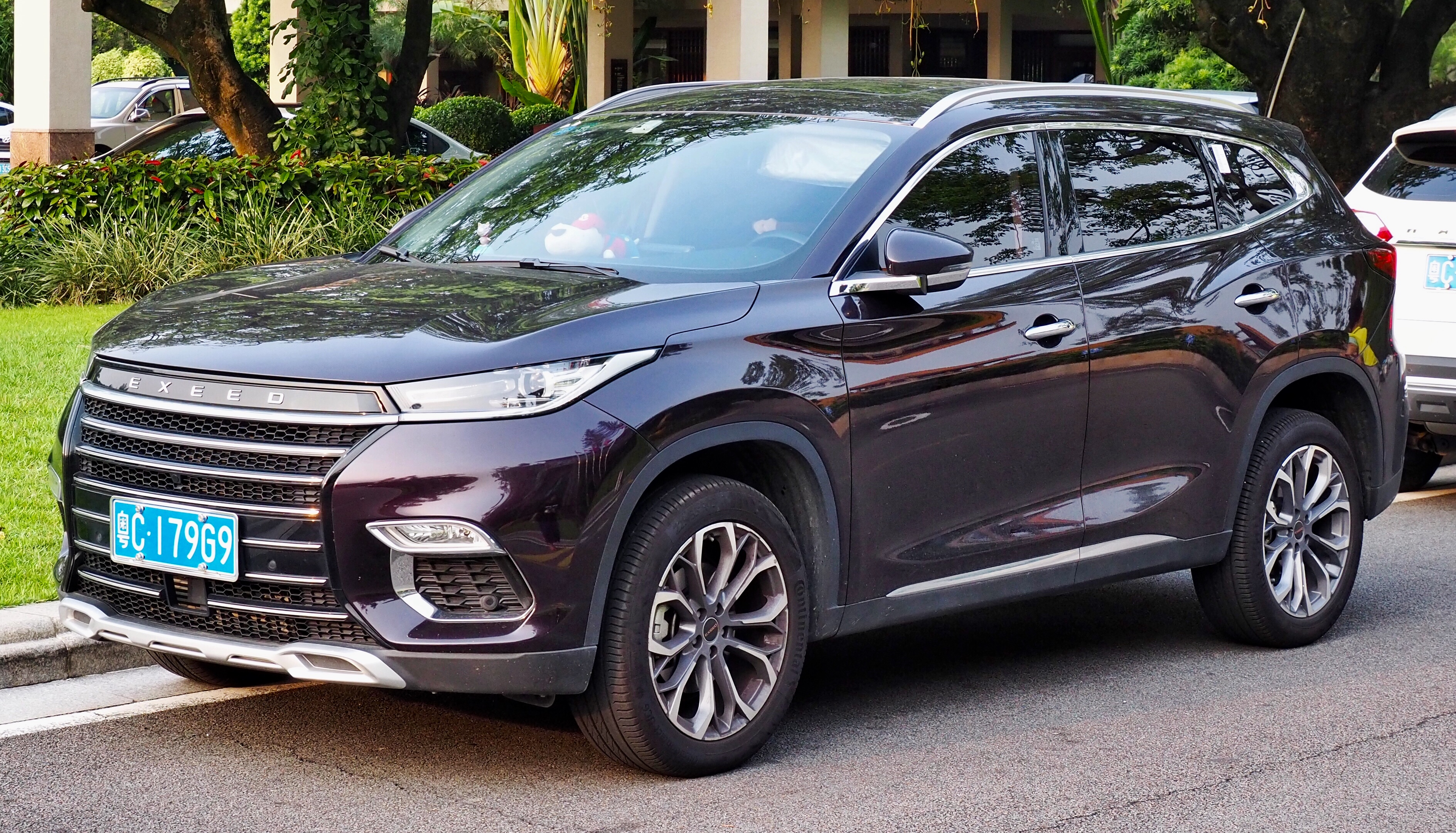
Exeed TX

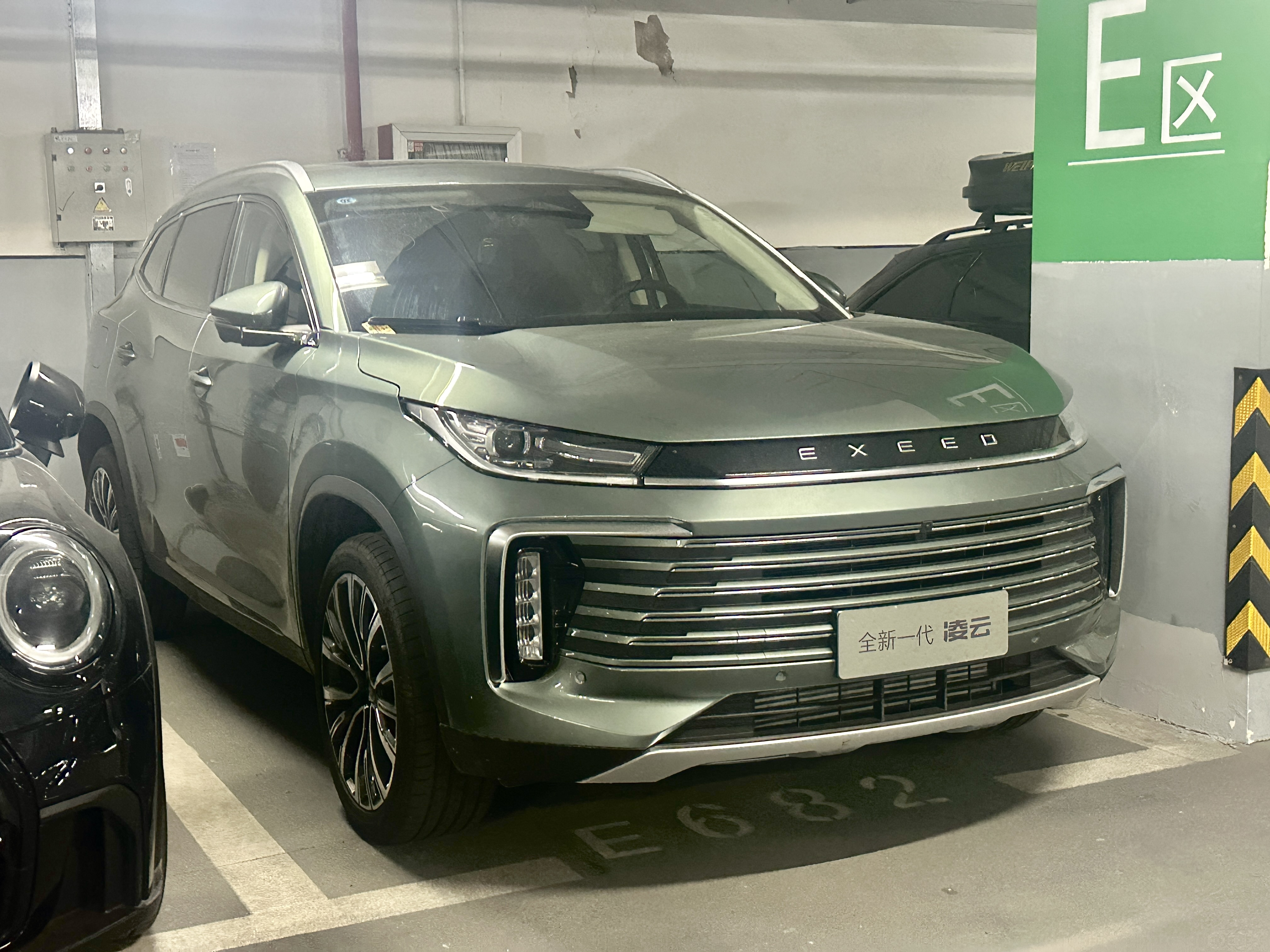
Exeed TXL

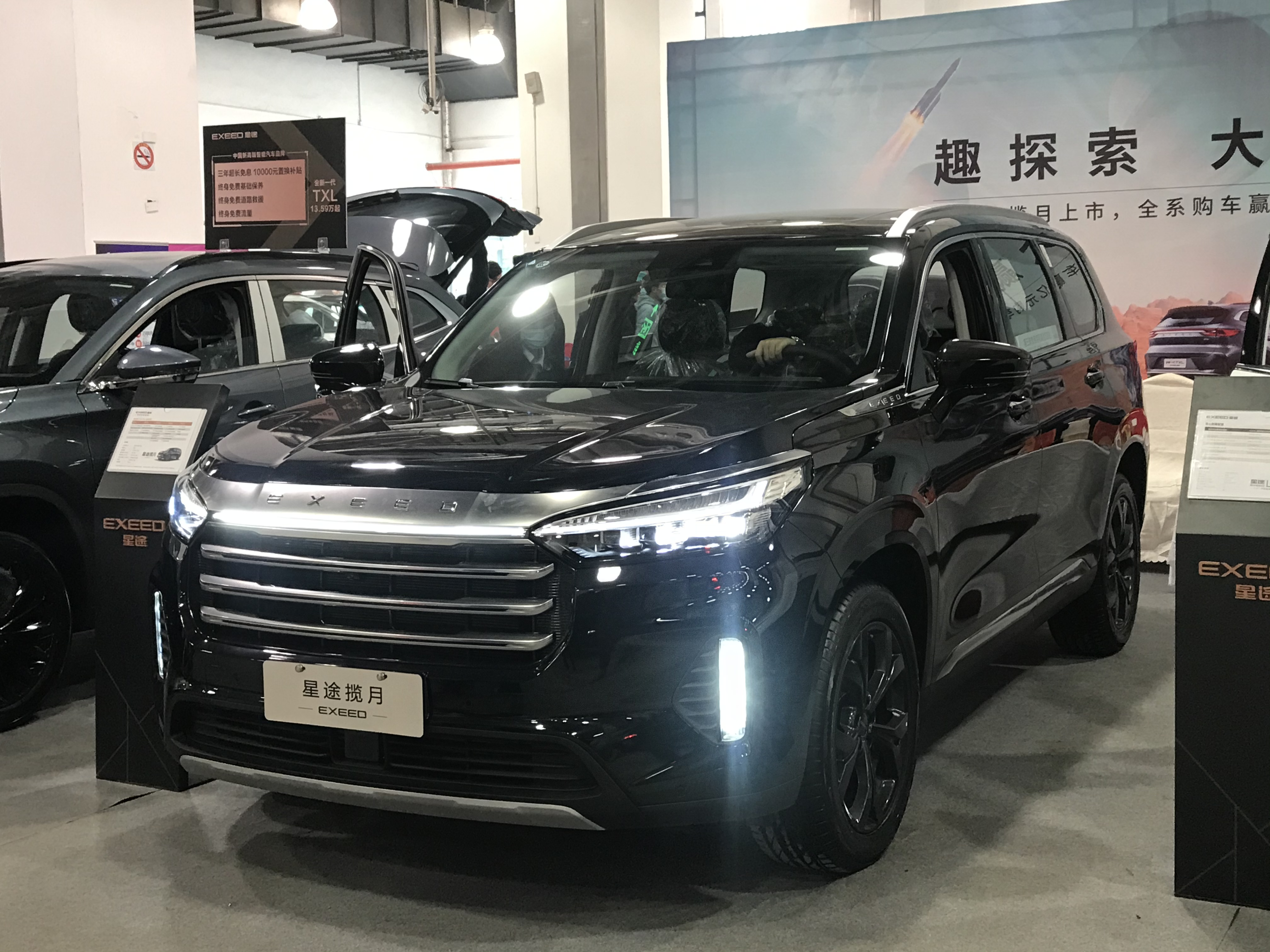
Exeed VX

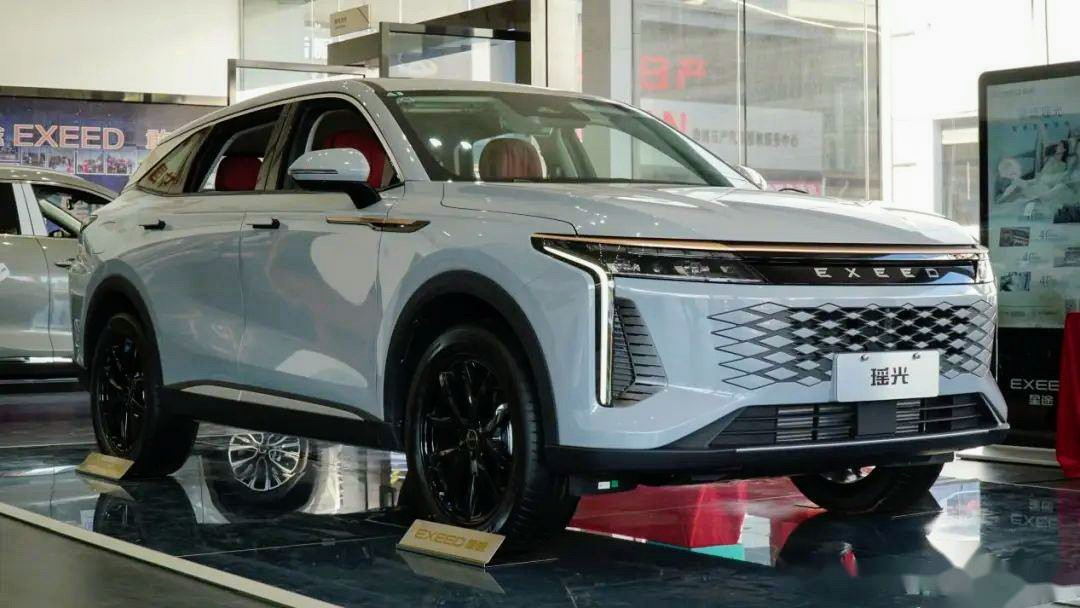
Exeed RX

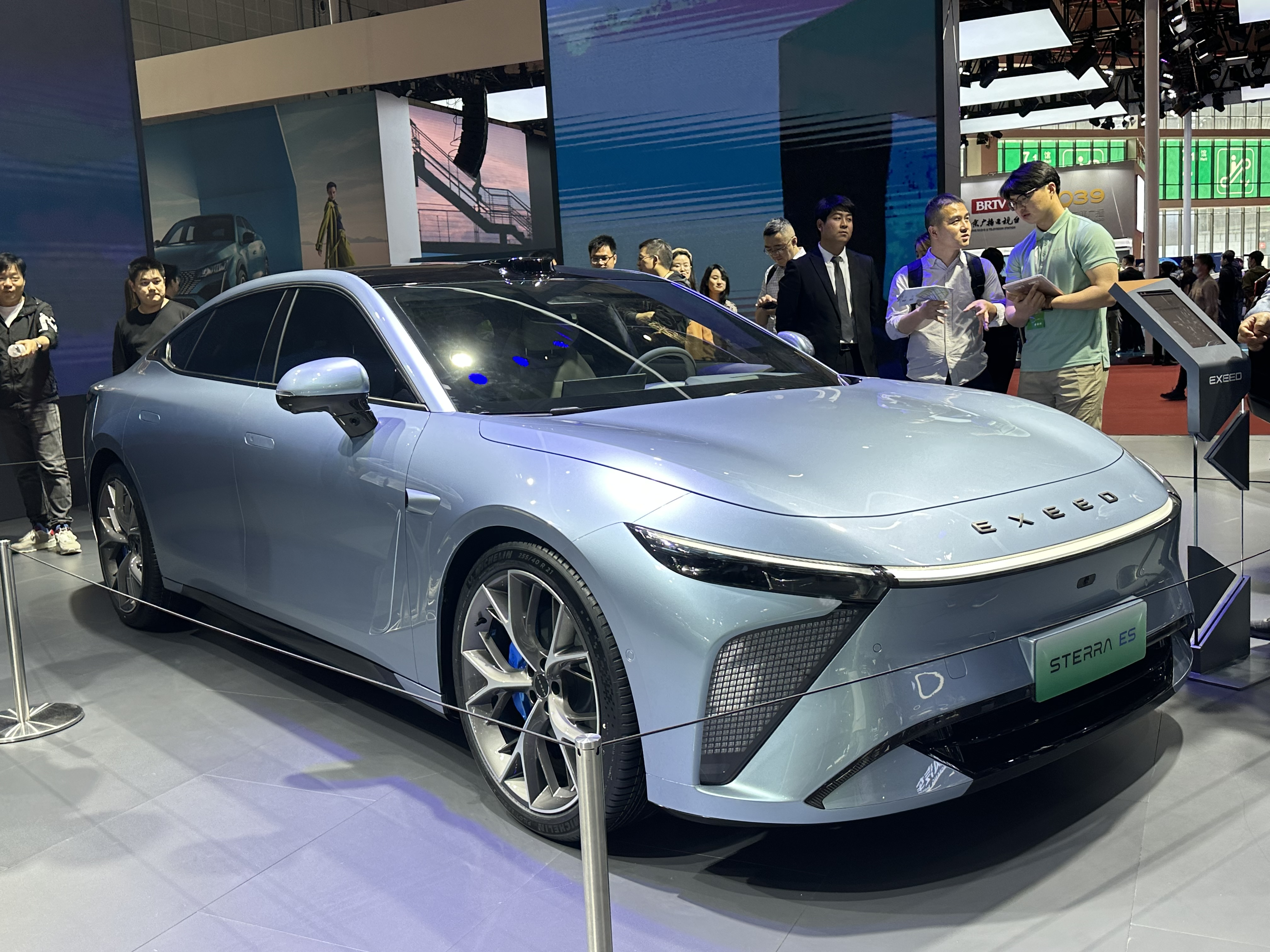
Exeed Sterra ES

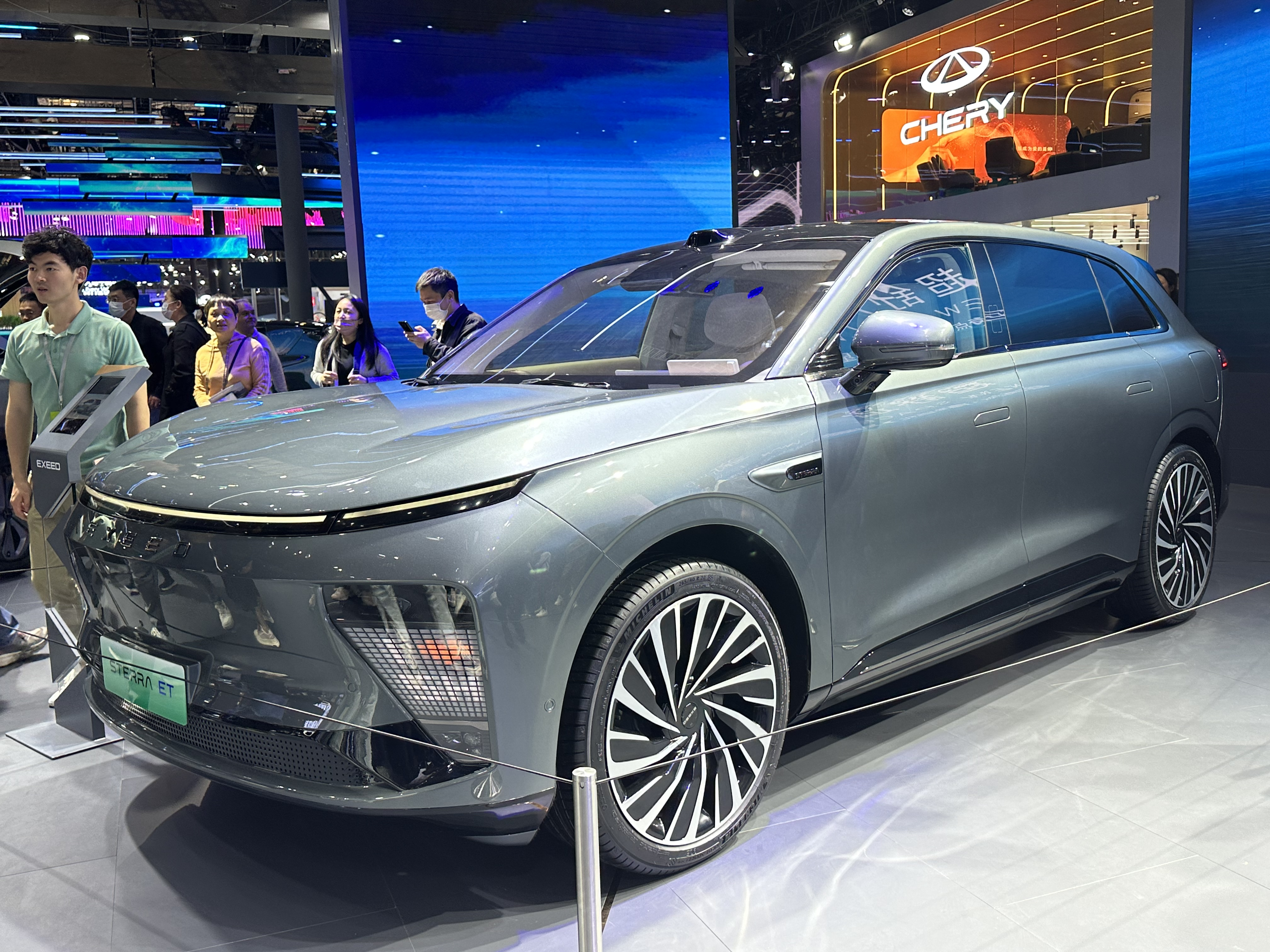
Exeed Sterra ET

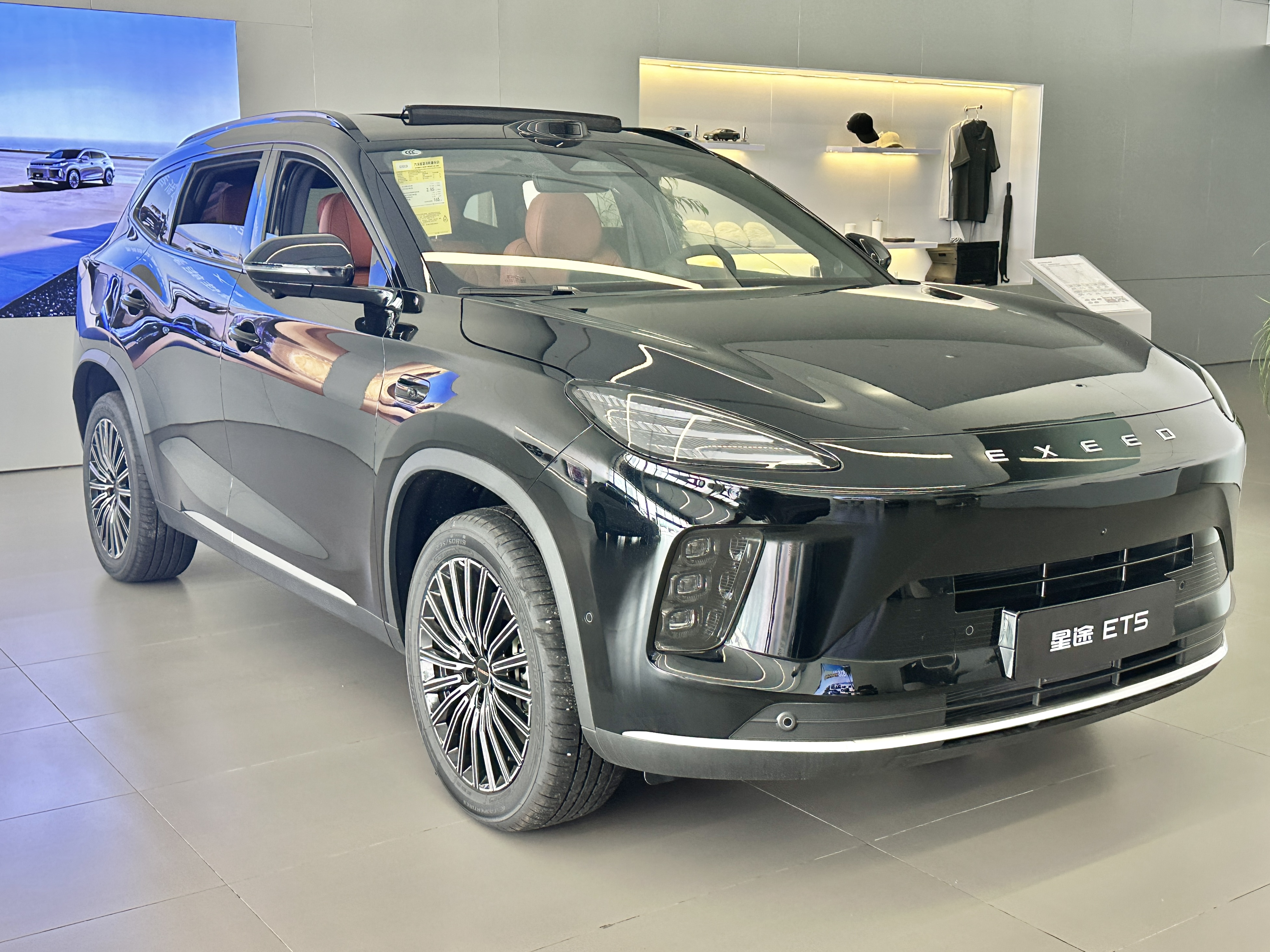
Exeed ET5

=== Concept vehicles ===
- TX concept (2017), a mid-size SUV previewing the production TX, badged as a Chery
- LX concept (2018), a compact electric SUV
- E-IUV (2019), a compact electric SUV
- VX concept (2019), a full-size SUV previewing the production VX
- Stellar (2021), a mid-size electric SUV
- AtlantiX concept (2022), a mid-size SUV previewing the production Yaoguang
- E08 concept (2024), a full-size MPV cancelled
- Sterra Phecda (Tianji) concept (2025), a full-size 6-seater SUV under the Sterra brand
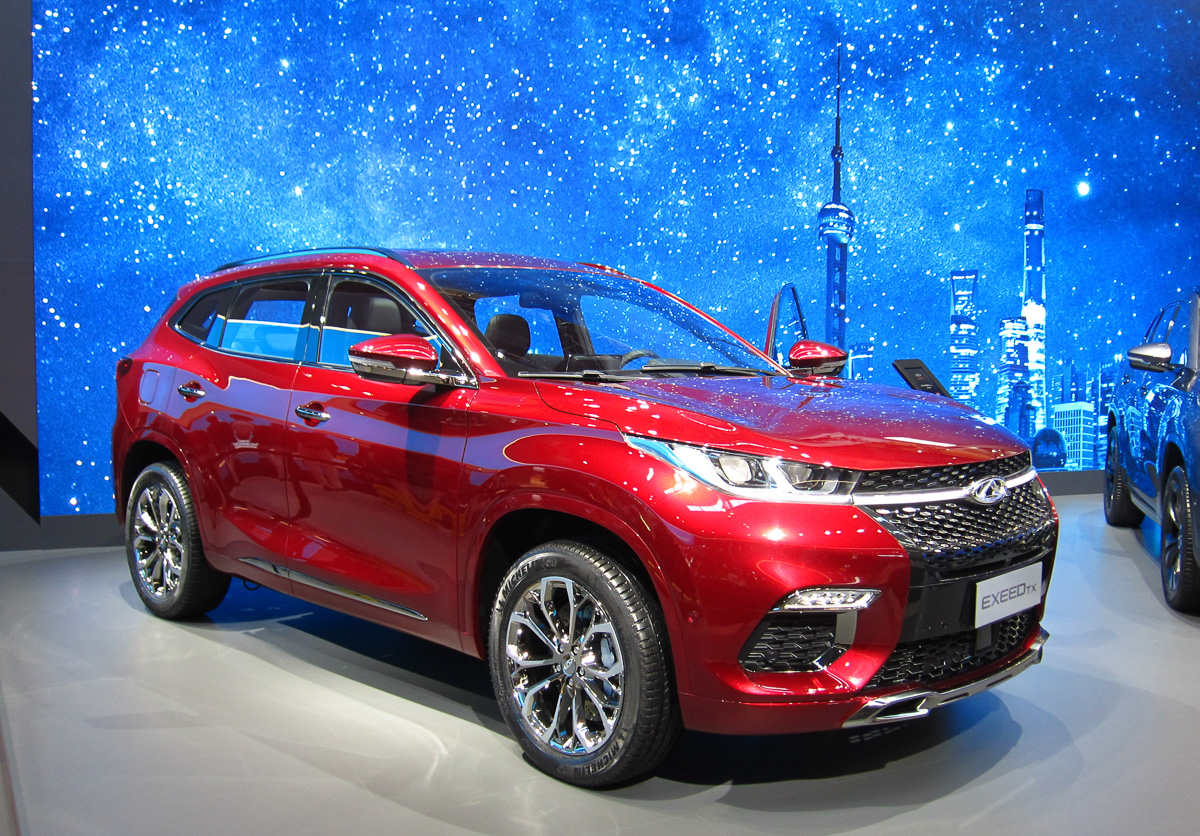
2017 Chery Exeed TX concept

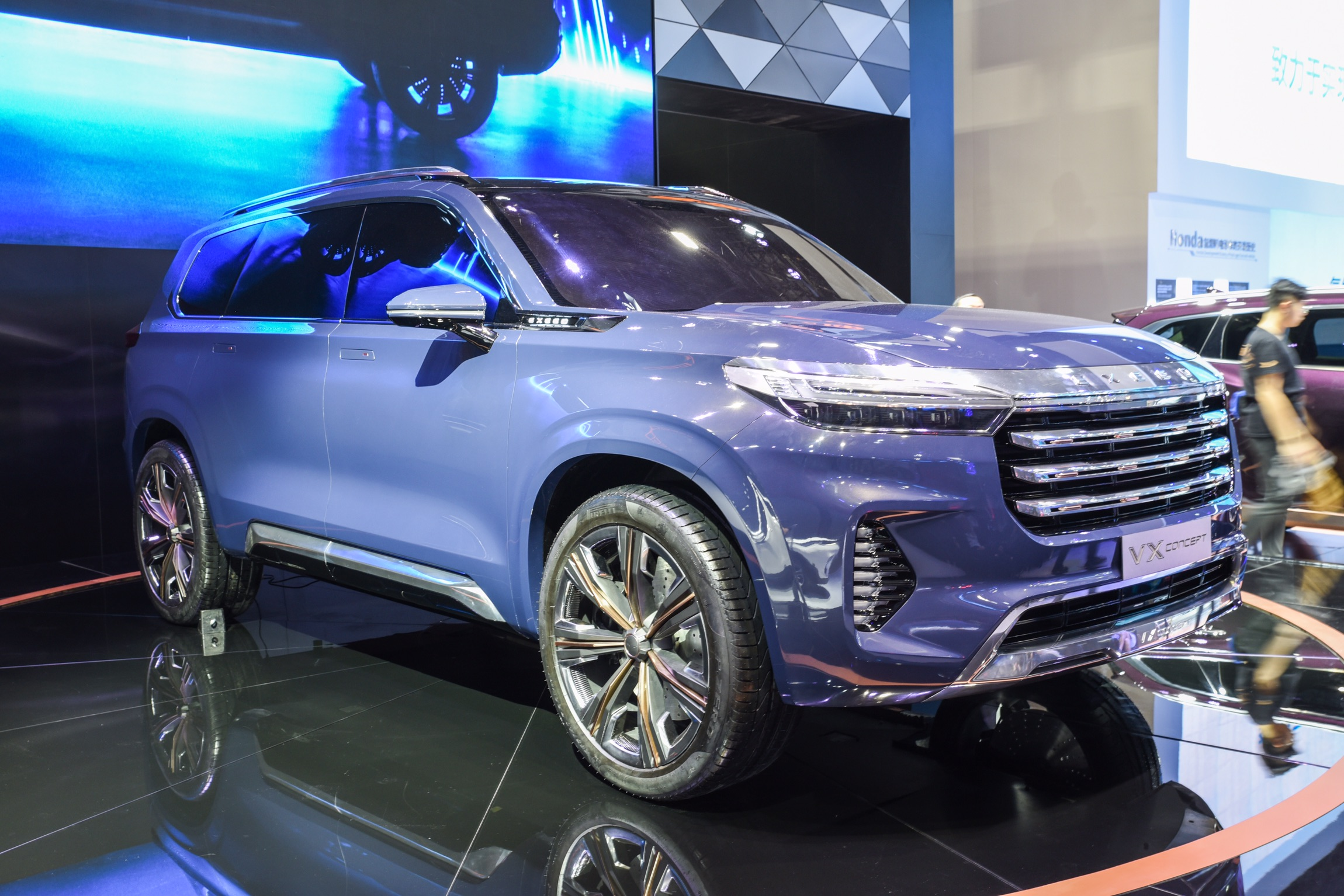
2019 Exeed VX concept

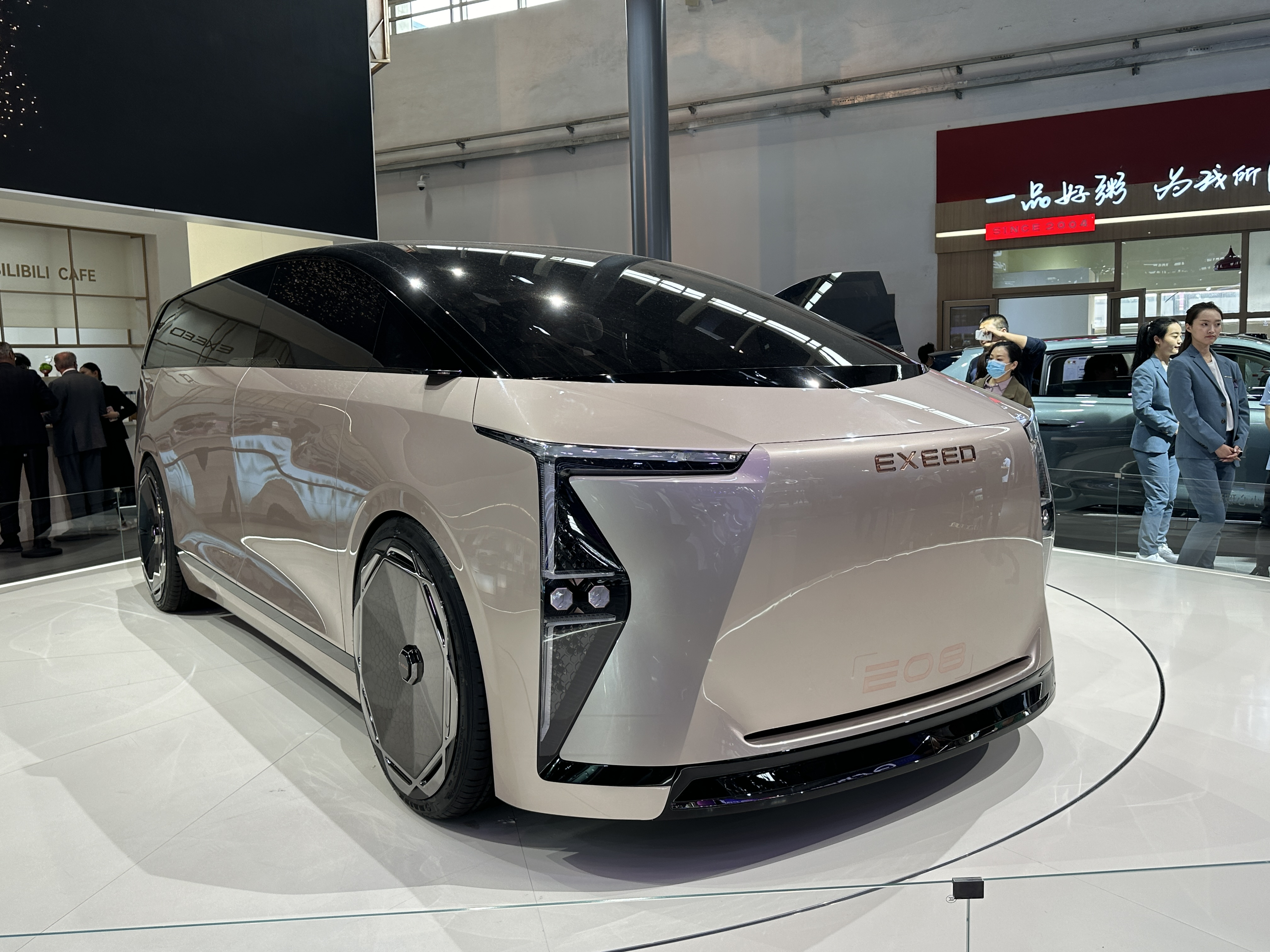
2024 Exeed E08 Concept

== Motorsport ==
In December 2025, Chery announced its plan to enter 24 Hours of Le Mans under its Exeed brand by 2030.

== See also ==
- Automobile manufacturers and brands of China
- List of automobile manufacturers of China
