= Exeed VX =

Mid-size crossover SUV

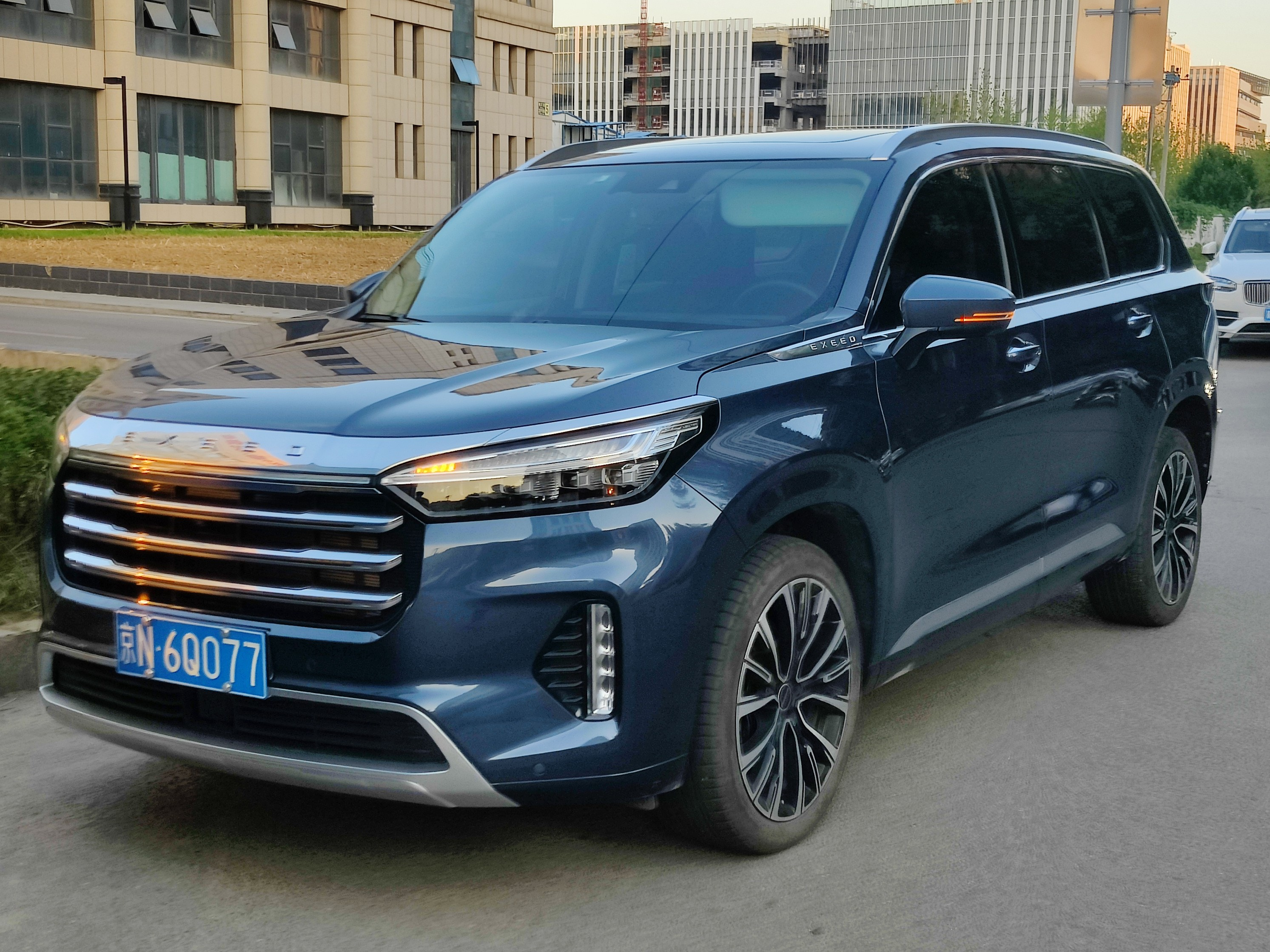
- Exeed VX (pre-facelift)

Overview
- Manufacturer: Exeed (Chery)
- Model code: M36T
- Also called: Exeed Lanyue (China); Xtrim VX/QX (Iran)
- Production: March 2021 – present
- Assembly: China: Wuhu, Anhui; Egypt: 6th of October City (EGA); Iran: Bam, Kerman Province (MVM)

Body and chassis
- Class: Mid-size crossover SUV
- Body style: 5-door SUV
- Layout: Front-engine, front-wheel-drive; Front-engine, all-wheel-drive
- Platform: M3X
- Related: Exeed TX

Powertrain
- Engine: Petrol: 1.6 L F4J16 I4 turbo; 2.0 L F4J20 I4 turbo; Petrol plug-in hybrid: 1.5 L SQRH4J15 I4 turbo
- Power output: 145–455 kW (194–610 hp; 197–619 PS)
- Transmission: 7-speed DCT; 8-speed automatic; 3-speed DHT (C-DM)
- Battery: 34.46 kWh LFP CATL
- Range: 1,209 km (751 mi) (C-DM)
- Electric range: 143 km (89 mi) (C-DM, WLTP)

Dimensions
- Wheelbase: 2,900 mm (114.2 in)
- Length: 4,970 mm (195.7 in); 5,010 mm (197.2 in) (C-DM)
- Width: 1,940 mm (76.4 in)
- Height: 1,795 mm (70.7 in); 1,800 mm (70.9 in) (C-DM)
- Curb weight: 2,280 kg (5,027 lb) (C-DM)

The Exeed VX or Exeed Lanyue (Chinese: 星途揽月; pinyin: xīng tú lǎn yuè) in China is a mid-size crossover SUV produced by Chery premium brand Exeed. It was introduced in September 2020, following a concept car showcase in November 2019.

== Overview ==
The Exeed VX was originally previewed by the Exeed VX Concept revealed during the 2019 Guangzhou Auto Show in November 2019. The concept previews a midsize crossover SUV significantly larger than the Exeed TX midsize crossover and features hidden door handles.

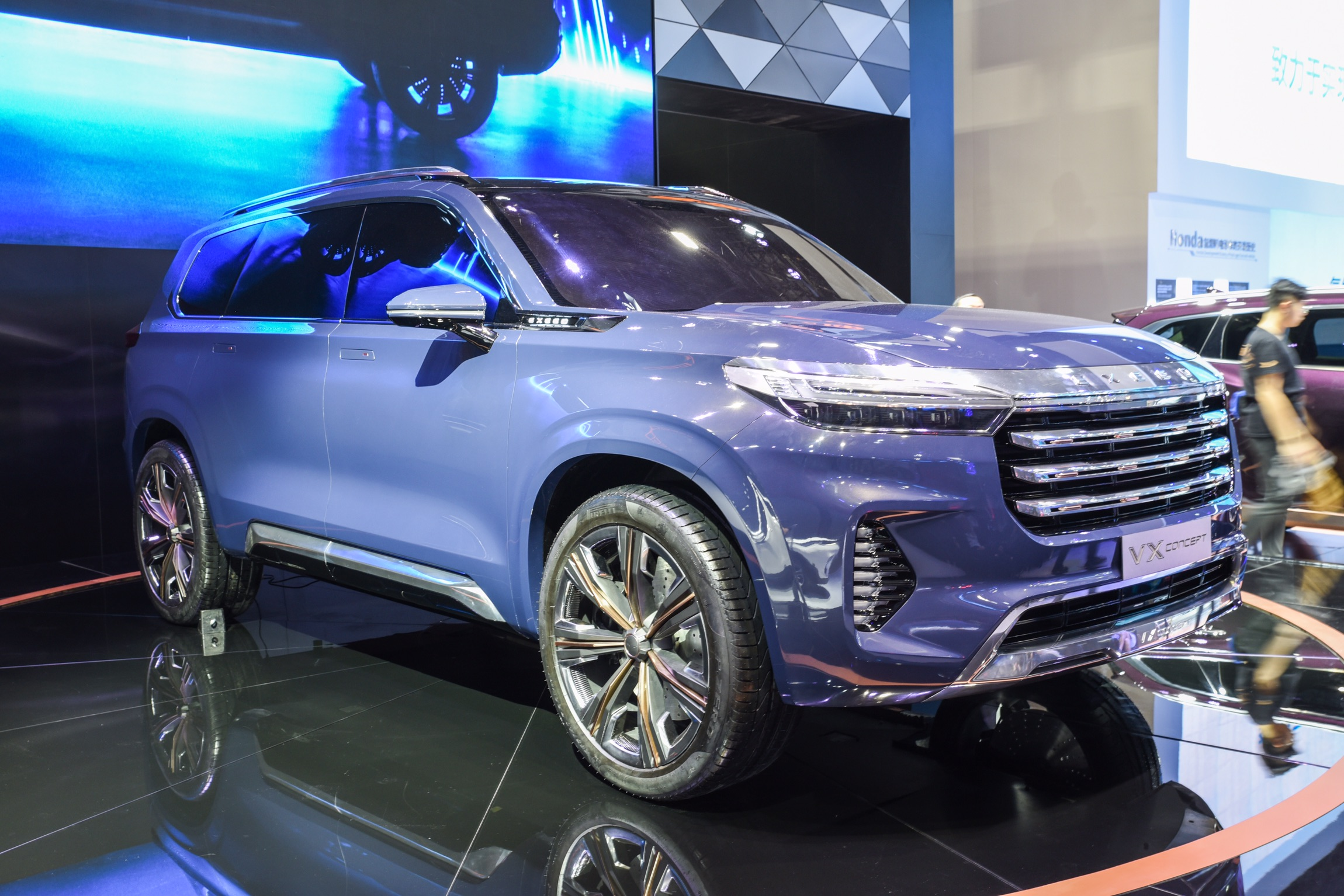
Exeed VX Concept

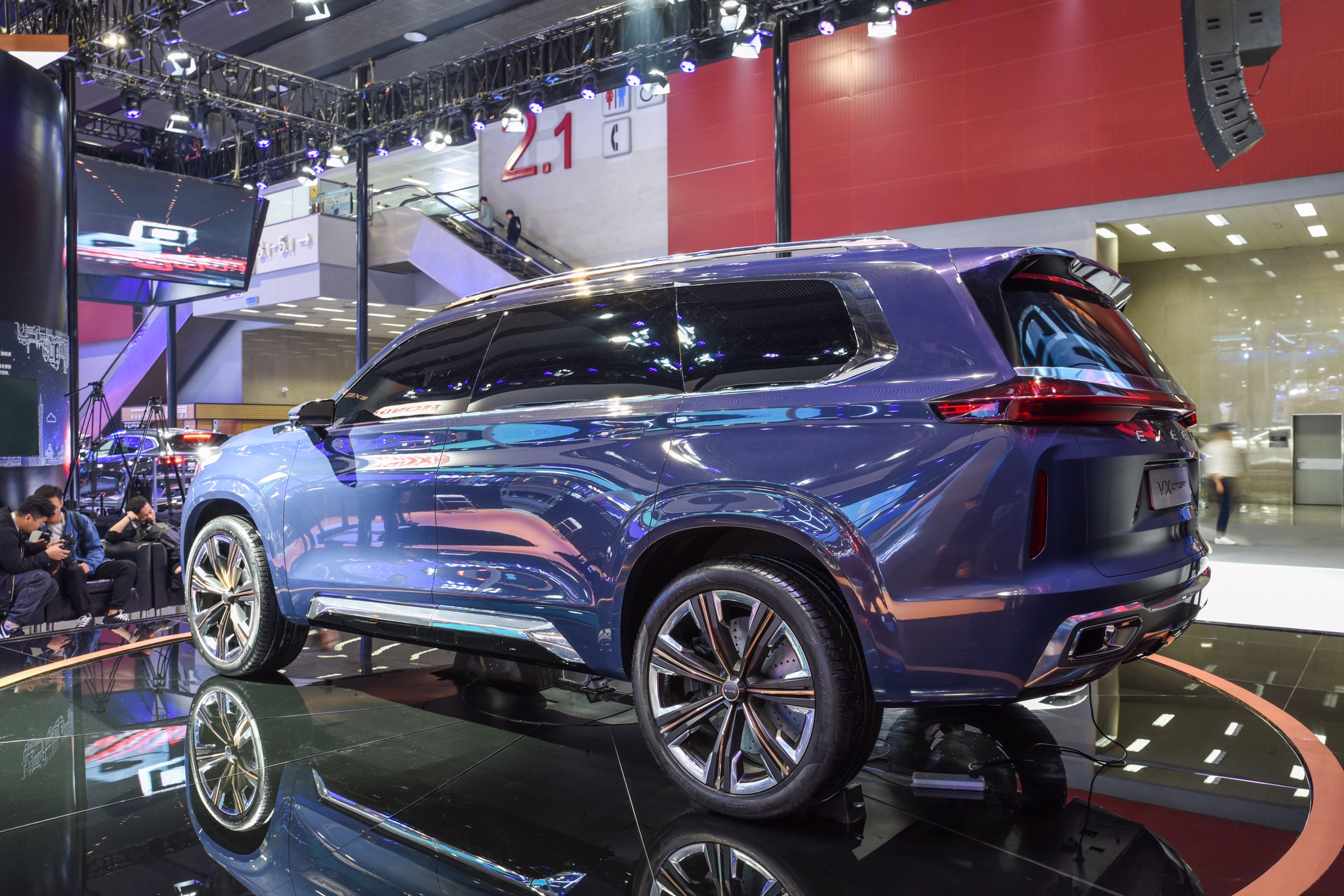
Rear view

The production version is near identical to the concept minus the hidden door handles, and was revealed during the 2020 Beijing Auto Show in September 2020 with sales to officially start in March 2021. The VX is positioned as the flagship SUV of the Exeed brand.

As of early January 2021 the Exeed VX was announced with an additional Chinese name called the Lanyue (揽月).

The dimensions of the Exeed VX measure 4,970 mm (195.7 in)/1,940 mm (76.4 in)/1,795 mm (70.7 in) (length/width/height), with a wheelbase of 2,900 mm (114.2 in) positioning it just above the Exeed TX. The Exeed VX can seat up to 7 people in 2+3+2 configuration. Prices start from 180,000 yuan.

A plug-in hybrid version variant called the VX C-DM was introduced in 2025, with the first units rolling off the production line on 7 February and pre-orders opening later that month. It is 40 mm (1.6 in) longer and slightly taller, but retains the standard version's styling and other specifications.

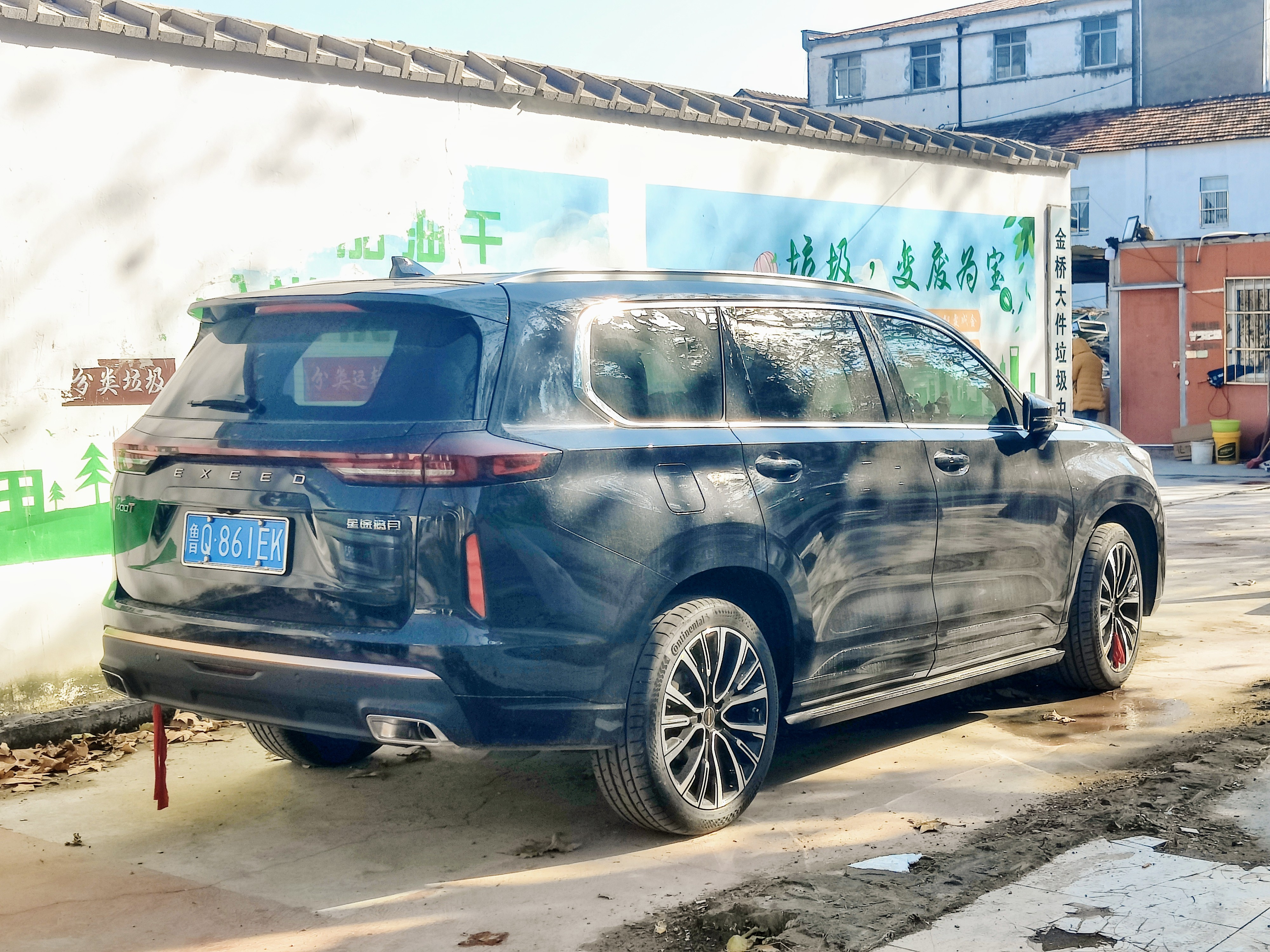
Rear view

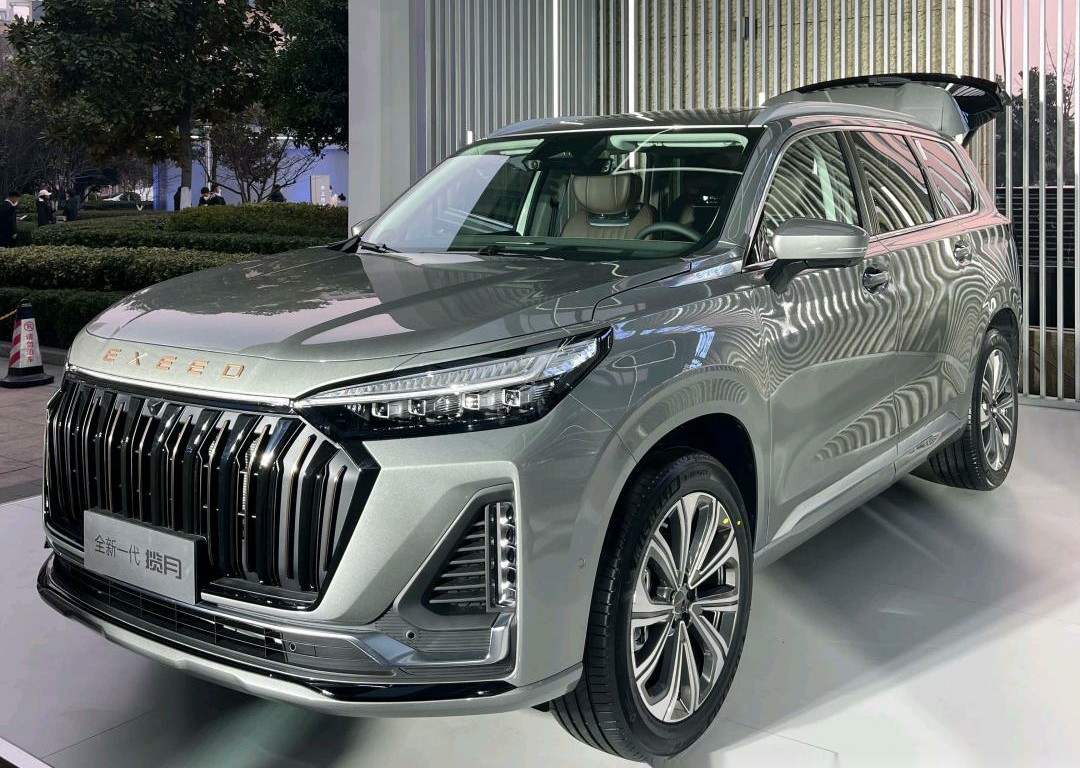
Exeed Lanyue (first facelift)

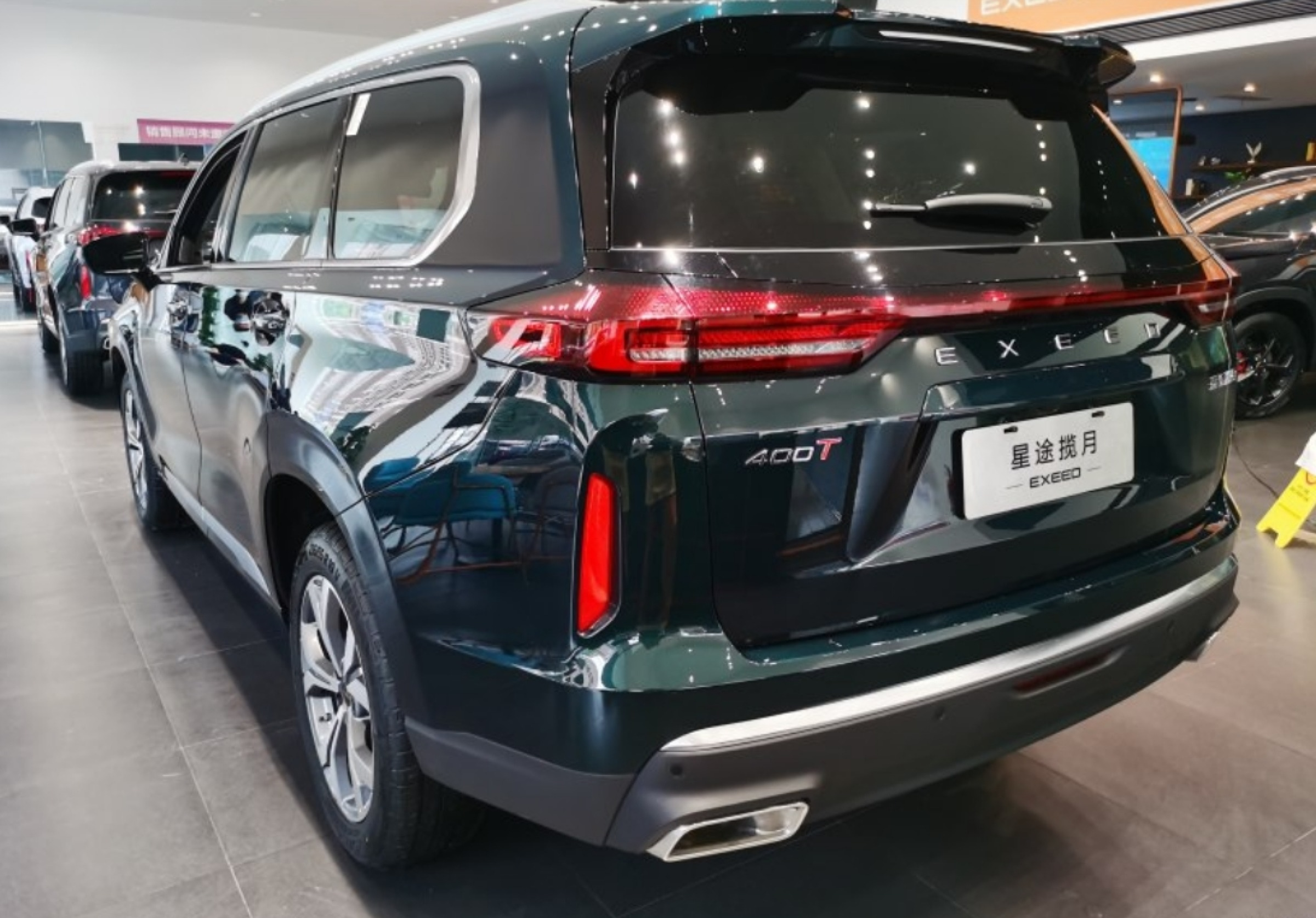
Rear view

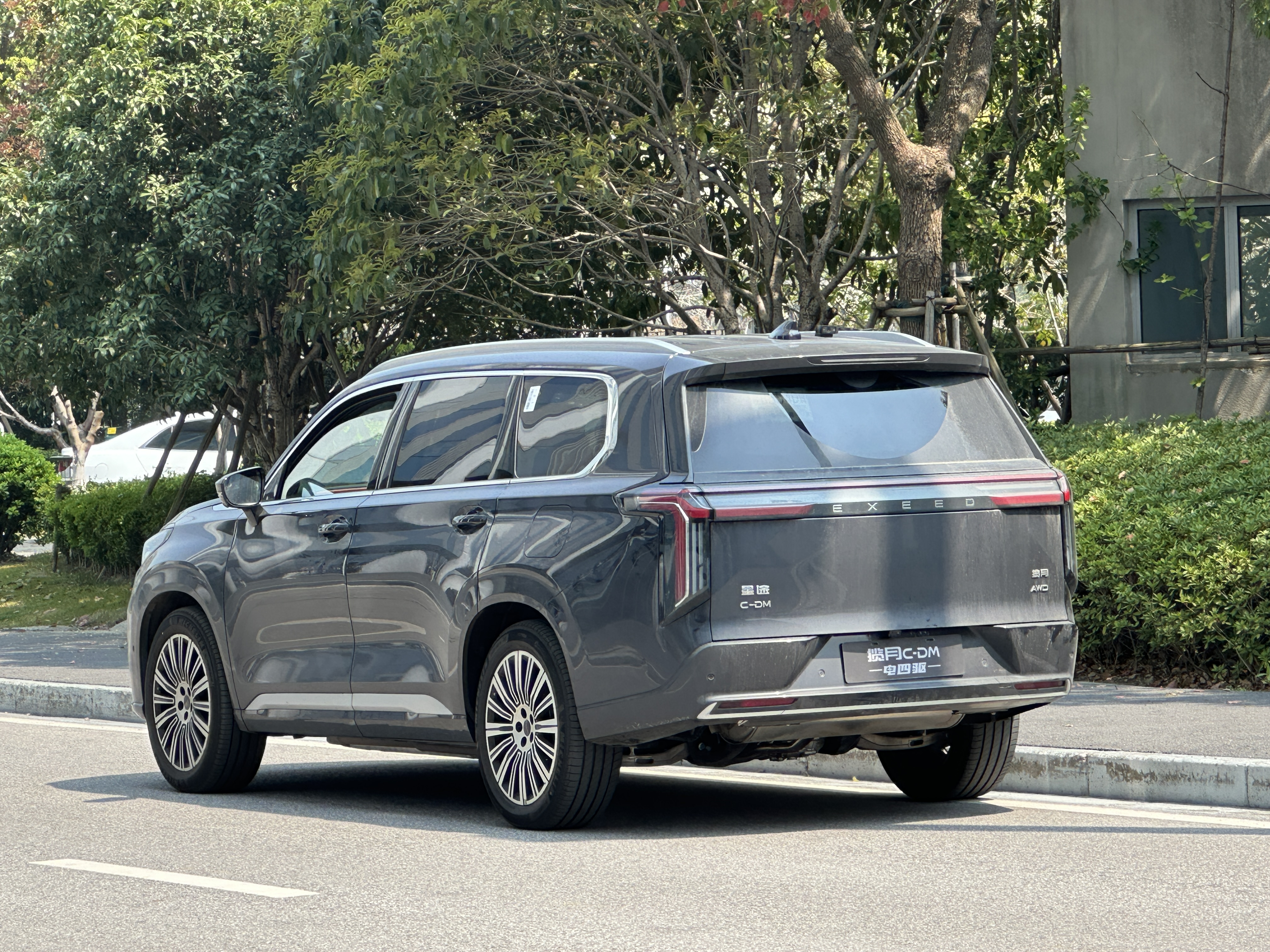
Exeed Lanyue (second facelift)

== Powertrain ==
The VX can be had with a 1.6-litre turbo engine, or a 2.0-litre TGDI engine, and 7-speed dual-clutch transmission. The 290T models feature the 1.6-litre turbo engine producing 145 kW (194 hp; 197 PS) and 290 N⋅m (30 kg⋅m; 214 lb⋅ft). The 390T models feature a 2.0-litre turbo engine producing 187 kW (251 hp; 254 PS) and 390 N⋅m (40 kg⋅m; 288 lb⋅ft). The 400T models featuring a higher output version of the 2.0-litre engine producing 192 kW (257 hp; 261 PS) and 400 N⋅m (41 kg⋅m; 295 lb⋅ft) with an enlarged 65-litre (14 imp gal; 17 US gal) fuel tank were later added to the product line. The 2023 model year facelift dropped the 290T models and replaced the seven-speed DCT transmission of the 400T models with an Aisin eight-speed automatic transmission.

The C-DM variant has a plug-in hybrid powertrain available exclusively in all-wheel-drive form. It is equipped with a 1.5-liter turbocharged inline-four petrol engine codenamed SQRH4J15. It runs in Miller cycle and has a compression ratio of 14.5:1, allowing for a claimed peak thermal efficiency of 44.5%. The engine outputs 115 kW (154 hp; 156 PS) at 5,200 rpm and 220 N⋅m (22 kg⋅m; 162 lb⋅ft) at 2,500–4000 rpm. The engine powers the front wheels through a 3-speed dedicated hybrid transmission with two integrated motors outputting a total of 165 kW (221 hp; 224 PS) while the rear wheels are independently driven by a 175 kW (235 hp; 238 PS) motor, for a combined system output of 455 kW (610 hp; 619 PS) and 920 N⋅m (94 kg⋅m; 679 lb⋅ft) of torque. Power is supplied by a CATL-supplied 34.46 kWh LFP battery pack which weighs 228 kg (503 lb) and has WLTP and CLTC electric range ratings of 143 km (89 mi) and 180 km (110 mi), respectively. It has a 0–100 km/h (62 mph) time of 4.26 seconds and a top speed of 180 km/h (112 mph).

== Sales ==
Year	China		
Year	Lanyue	C-DM	Total
2023	8,226	—	8,226
2024	10,207	—	10,207
2025	4,847	3,083	7,930
