= Exeed TX =

Mid-size crossover SUV

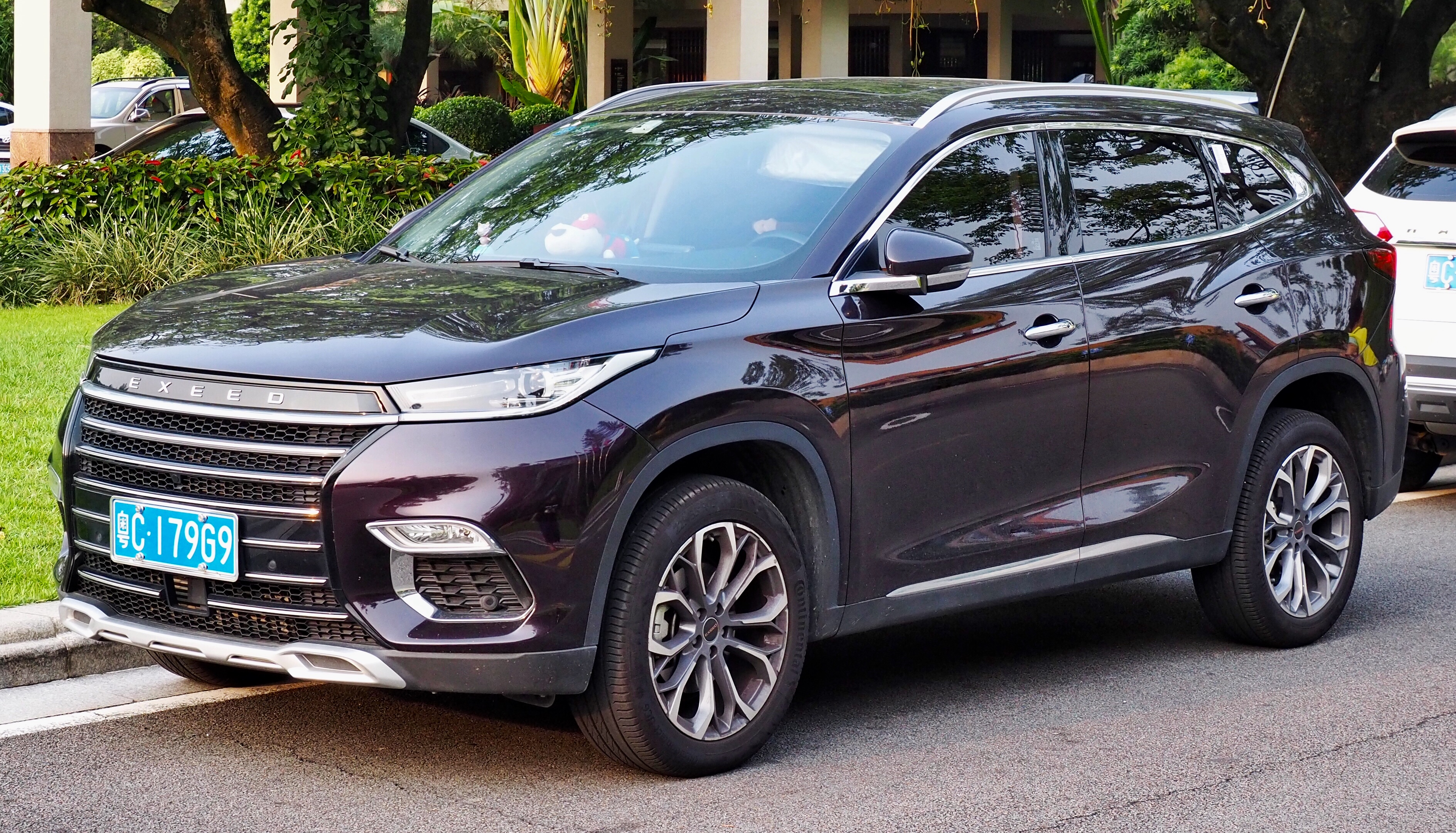
- Exeed TXL

Overview
- Manufacturer: Exeed (Chery)
- Model code: M31T; E05 (ET5)
- Also called: Chery Exeed TX (pre-production); Exeed Lingyun; Xtrim TX/TXL (Iran); Cheryexeed TX (Russia; 2020–2021); Exeed ET5 (EV/EREV, 2025–present); Exeed MX (export); Esteo MX (Russia)
- Production: 2019–present
- Assembly: China: Wuhu, Anhui; Iran: Bam, Kerman Province (MVM)
- Designer: Alan Derosier; Weifeng Song

Body and chassis
- Class: Mid-size crossover SUV
- Body style: 5-door SUV
- Layout: ICE: Front engine, front-wheel drive; Front engine, all-wheel drive; Hybrid–REEV: Front-engine, rear-motor, rear-wheel-drive (ET5)
- Platform: M3X
- Related: Exeed VX

Powertrain
- Engine: Petrol: 1.6 L Acteco F4J16 I4 turbo; 2.0 L Acteco F4J20C I4 turbo; EREV: 1.5 L I4 turbo (generator only)
- Electric motor: PMSM on rear axle
- Power output: 145 kW (194 hp; 197 PS) (1.6 turbo); 192 kW (257 hp; 261 PS) (2.0 turbo)
- Transmission: 7-speed DCT
- Hybrid drivetrain: Series (EREV)

Dimensions
- Wheelbase: 2,697 mm (106.2 in) (TX); 2,800 mm (110.2 in) (TXL, ET5)
- Length: 4,664 mm (183.6 in) (TX); 4,775 mm (188.0 in) (TXL); 4,780 mm (188.2 in) (ET5)
- Width: 1,872 mm (73.7 in); 1,890 mm (74.4 in) (ET5)
- Height: 1,685 mm (66.3 in); 1,725 mm (67.9 in) (ET5)

The Exeed TX or Exeed Lingyun (Chinese: 星途凌云; pinyin: xīng tú líng yún) in China is a mid-size crossover SUV produced by Chery under its premium brand Exeed.

== History ==
The vehicle debuted at International Motor Show Germany in September 2017 in Frankfurt in pre-production form. The vehicle is based on the M3X platform developed by Chery with Magna International.

At the 2019 Shanghai International Auto Show, the Chery showed off the production version of the TX under the new Exeed brand. Unlike the vehicle shown in Frankfurt, this version features no Chery branding whatsoever, instead featuring a larger grille and the Exeed name written out. Alongside the standard TX, Exeed also showed off the TXL which is a 7-passenger 3-row version of the standard TX. Other than the length and wheelbase, nothing else has fundamentally changed between it and the standard TX. Production start on 24 January 2019.

The Exeed TX and TXL is both powered by a 1.6-litre turbocharged engine meeting the China VI (CN-6) emission standards. The Exeed TX is available in three models equipped with a 1.6 litre turbocharged direct injection engine producing 145 kW (194 hp; 197 PS) and peak torque of 290 N⋅m (214 lb⋅ft; 30 kg⋅m), mated to a 7-speed dual-clutch gearbox. Additionally, the top of the trim TX Platinum version is equipped with a all-wheel drive system. The fuel consumption is 6.8 L/100 km (42 mpg_{‑imp}; 35 mpg_{‑US}) for front-wheel drive and 7.4 L/100 km (38 mpg_{‑imp}; 32 mpg_{‑US}) for all-wheel drive, claimed by officials.

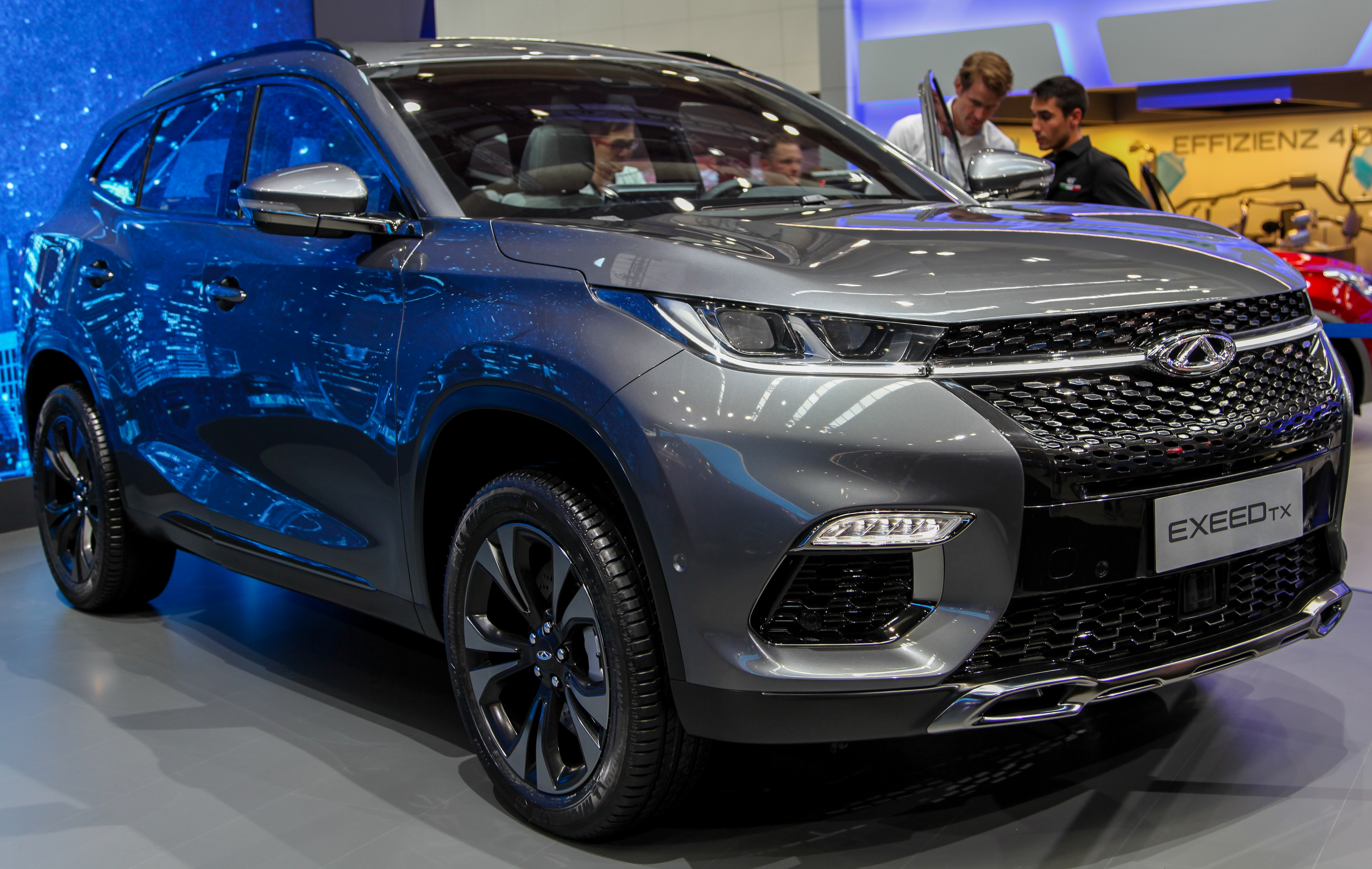
Chery Exeed TX (pre-production)

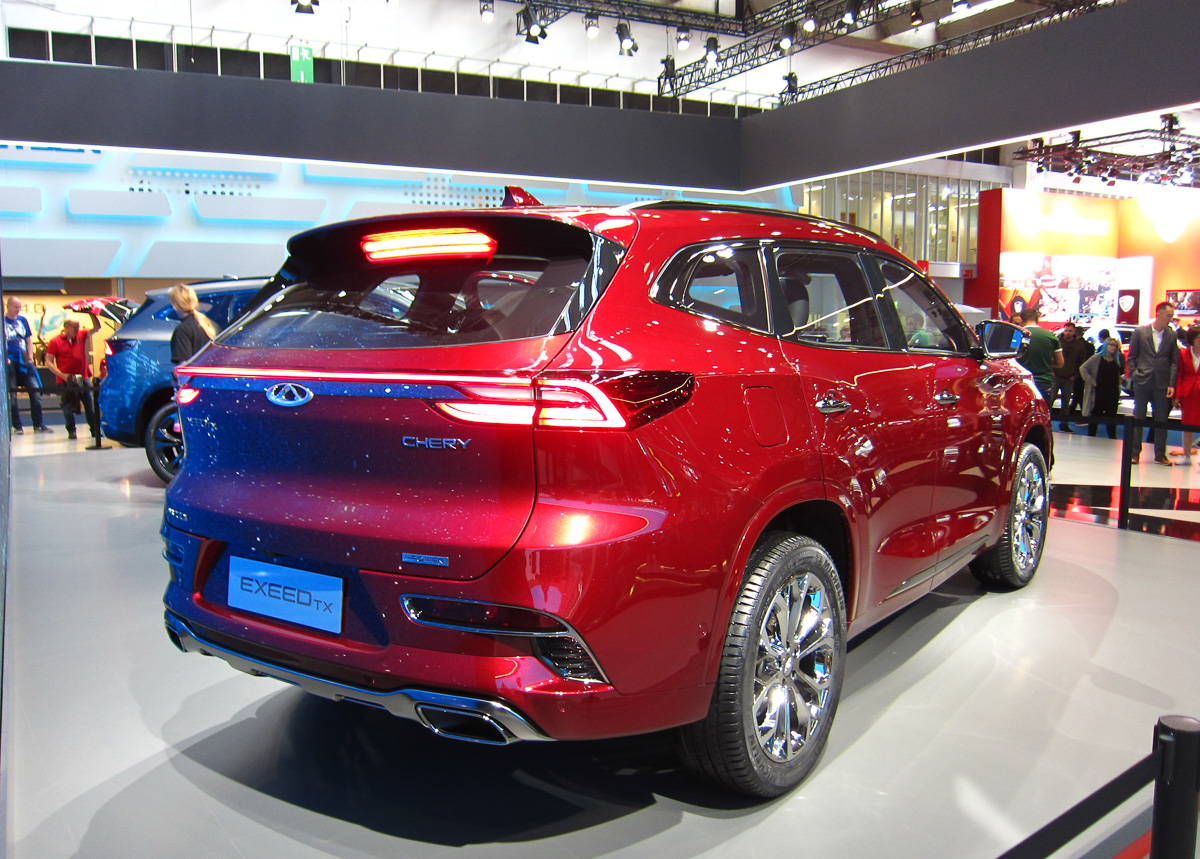
Rear view

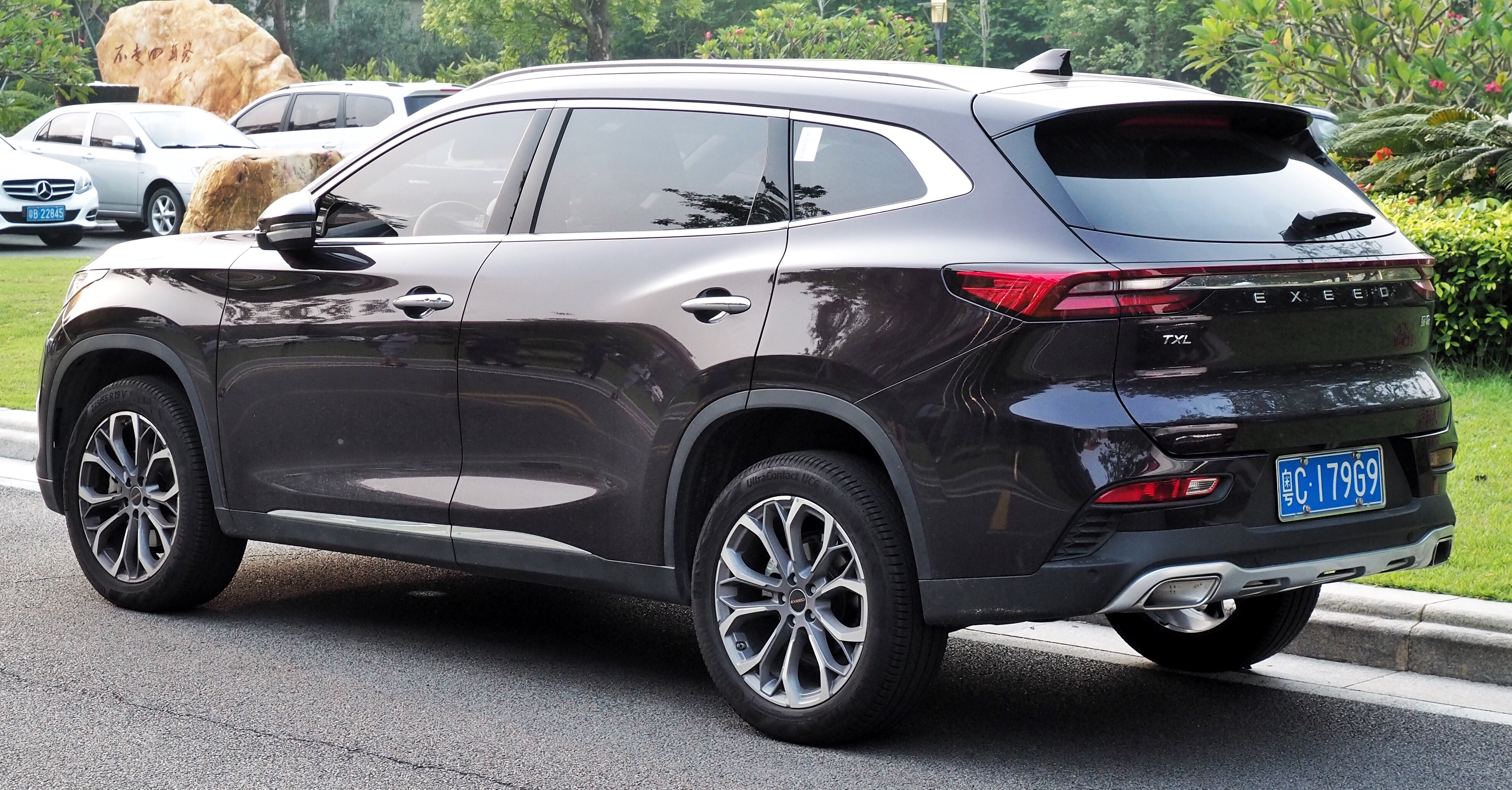
Rear view

=== 2021 (facelift) ===
The Exeed TXL received a facelift for the 2021 model year. In comparison with the model it replaces, the restyled TXL gained a redesigned bumper with a grid formed by horizontal bars in body color. Additionally, restyled LED daytime running lights are positioned vertically and the redesigned air intake is positioned the bottom. The rear end received refurbished deflectors, reworked fenders and minor changes to the inside of the tail lamps. The interior changes include redesigned IP with digital screens both in the instrument panel and in the multimedia center console integrated forming a single unit.

Mechanically, the Exeed TXL facelift still uses the same powertrain as the pre-facelift model. Powering the crossover is a 1.6-litre direct-injection petrol engine, producing 194 hp (145 kW; 197 PS) of power and 29.6 kg⋅m (290 N⋅m; 214 lb⋅ft) of torque. The gearbox is an automated seven-speed dual-clutch transmission. A 2.0-litre direct-injection petrol engine producing 257 hp (192 kW; 261 PS) of power and 40.8 kg⋅m (400 N⋅m; 295 lb⋅ft) of torque was later added to the product line.

As of early August 2021 the Exeed TXL was announced with an additional Chinese name called the Lingyun (凌云).

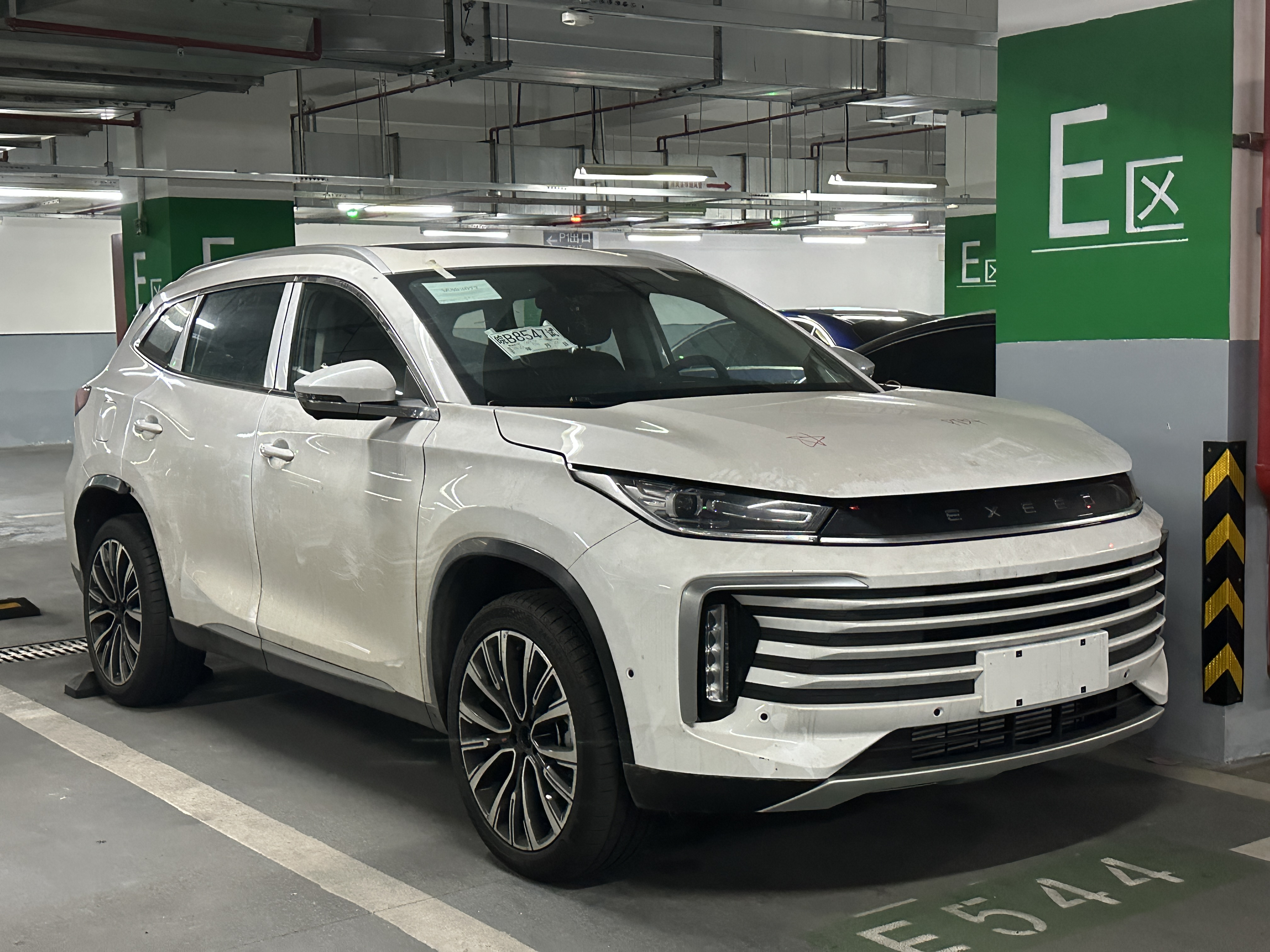
Exeed TXL 2021 (facelift)

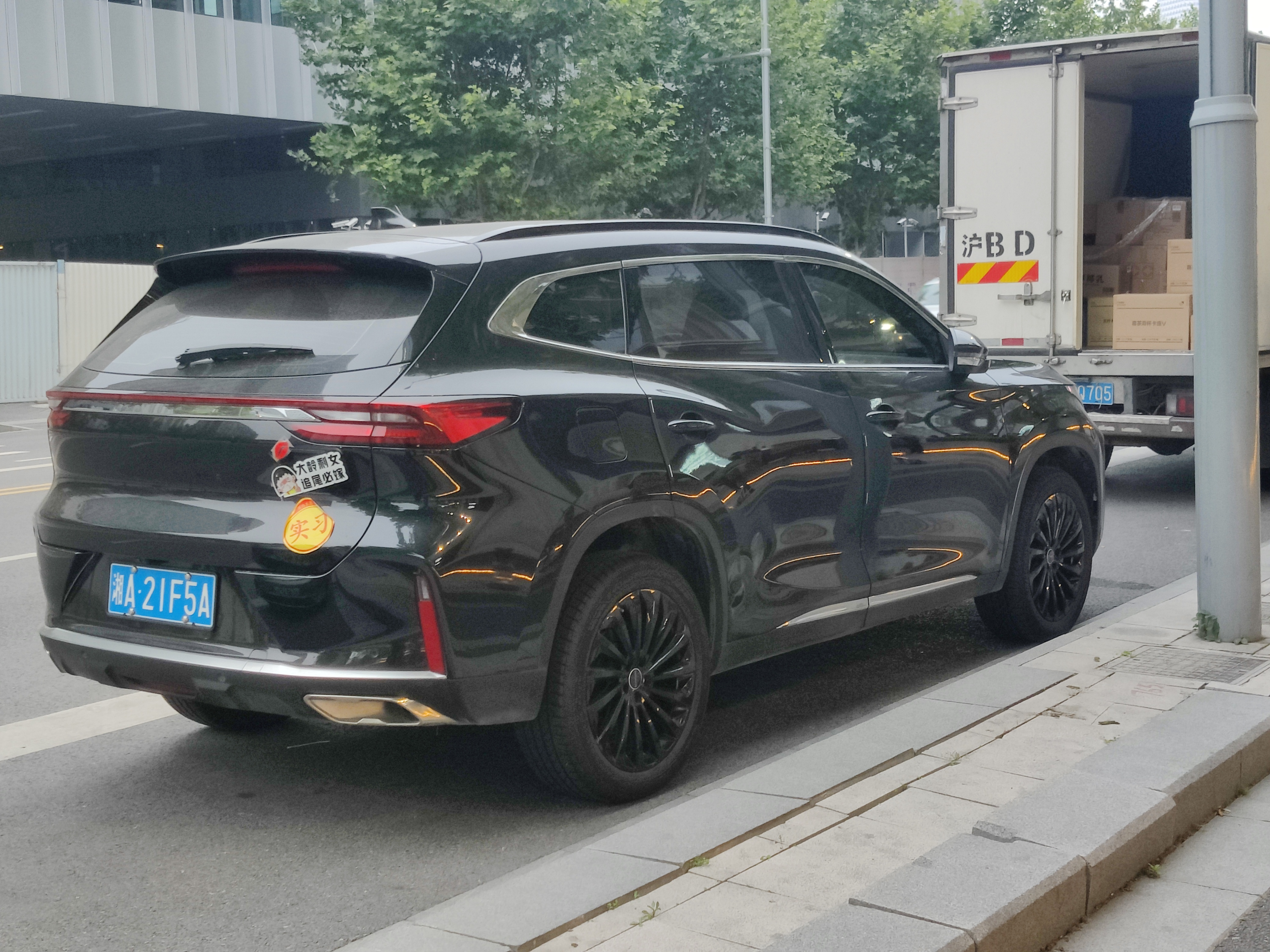
Rear view

=== Exeed ET5 and Lingyun 2026 update ===
Based on the Exeed TX, a completely restyled version named the Exeed ET5 was unveiled on 29 August 2025. The ET5 would be sold as the Exeed MX in export markets.

As of July 2026, latest unveiled info suggest that the ET5 would be renamed back to Lingyun as the next Lingyun facelift. The updated Lingyun would be powered by a 2.0 liter turbo inline-4 engine producing 192kW (261hp).

Exeed ET5

Rear view

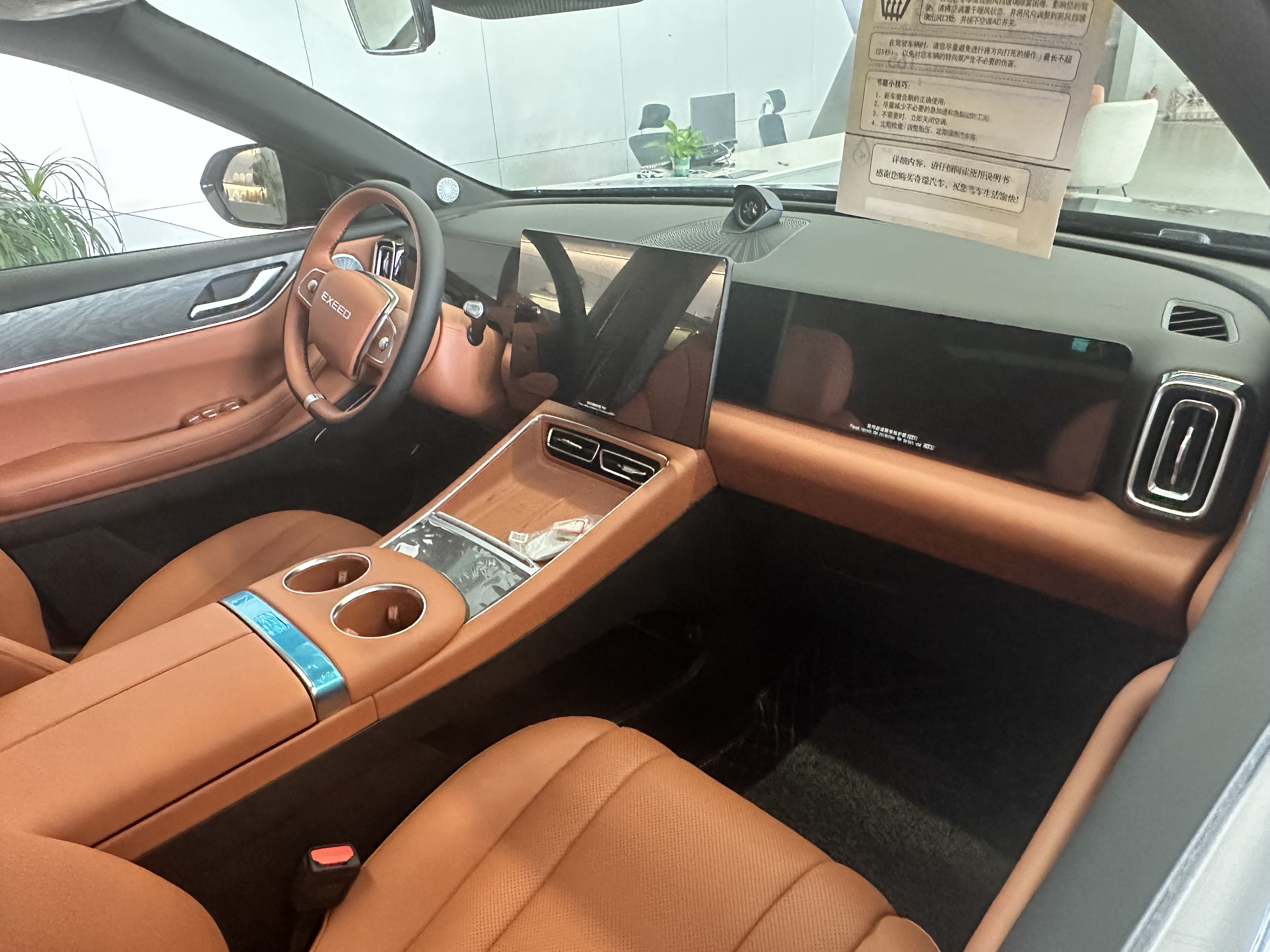
Interior

== Cancelled American version ==
Under the name Vantas TX/TXL, the Exeed TX was planned to be the first Chery vehicle sold in North America starting in 2021 for the 2022 model year. Production was to take place in knock-down kit form in the United States at a not-yet-determined location. About 50% of the content would be made in China; the rest would come from North American suppliers. Chery planned a full assembly plant in the US for Vantas vehicles when sales increases. In April 2021, it was announced that the first model would begin production in 2022.

HAAH Automobile Holdings would act as Chery’s US distributor for the Vantas brand, specific to North America. However, the Chery brand cannot be used in the United States or Canada as General Motors citing that the Chery brand is too close to Chevrolet and its longtime Chevy nickname.

In July 2021, HAAH filed for bankruptcy and plans to sell the Vantas brand in North America were scrapped.

== Sales ==
Year	Total China production	
Year	TX	ET5
2019	15,994	—
2020	13,482	—
2021	37,154	—
2022	53,441	—
2023	34,447	—
2024	34,104	—
2025	12,304	2,549
