= Chery Tiggo 3x =

Subcompact crossover SUV

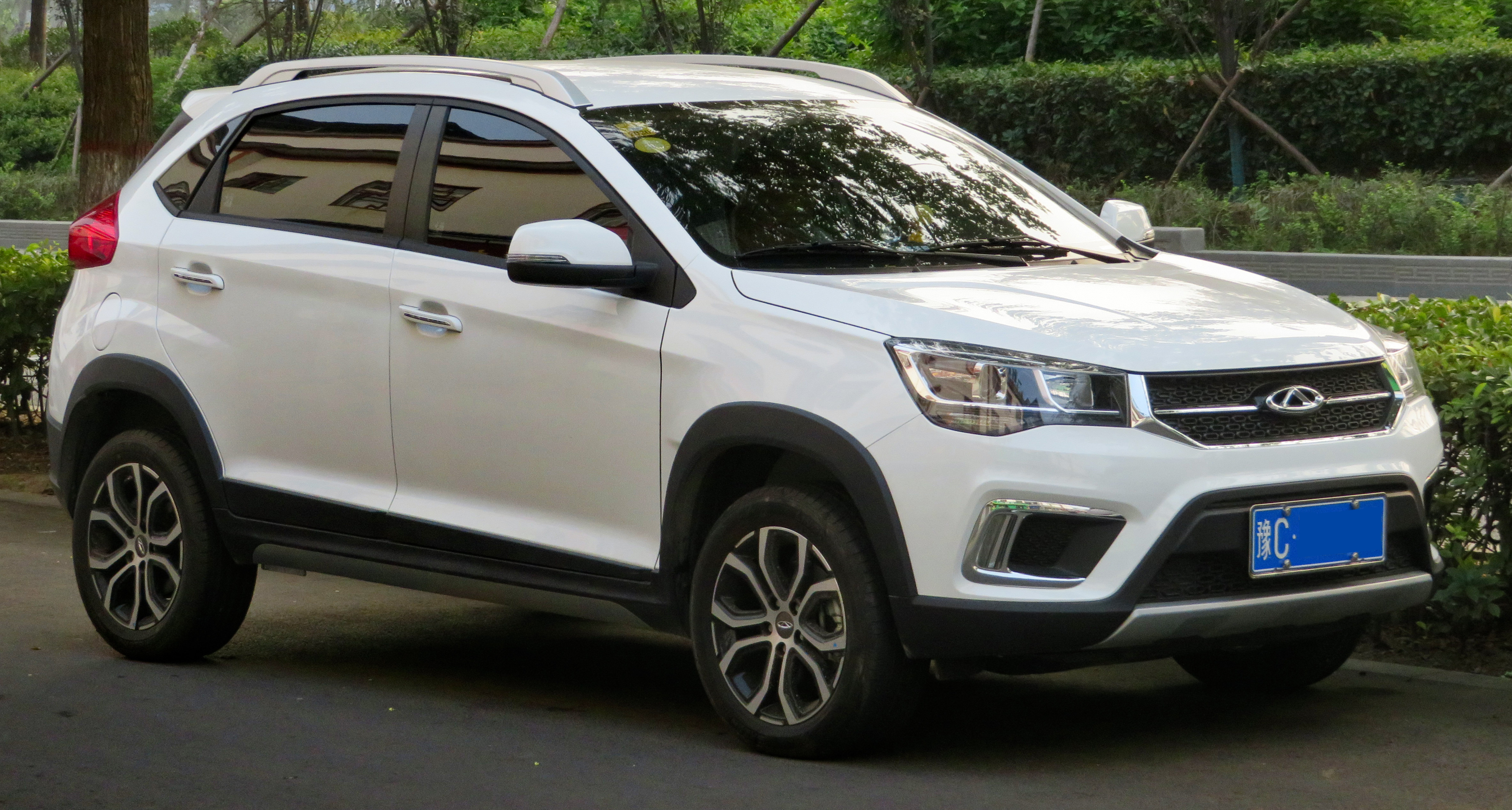

Overview
- Manufacturer: Chery
- Also called: Chery Tiggo 2 (South America, Tunisia, Philippines); Chirey Tiggo 2 (Mexico); Chery Tiggo 1X (Low-cost version, Tunisia); Omoda 3 (Morocco); MVM X22/X22 Pro (Iran) MVM X33 Cross (Iran) DR3 (Italy) DR 3.0 (Italy)
- Production: 2016–present 2017-2022 (Brazil)
- Assembly: Wuhu, Anhui, China; Jacareí, Brazil (CAOA); Bam, Kerman Province, Iran (MVM)

Body and chassis
- Class: Subcompact crossover SUV
- Body style: 5-door crossover SUV
- Layout: FF layout
- Related: Chery Fulwin 2 hatchback

Powertrain
- Engine: 1.0 L SQRE3T10 I3 turbo (flex fuel); 1.5 L SQR477F I4 (petrol); 1.5 L SQRE4G15C I4 (petrol)
- Electric motor: 3xe: 121 hp (90 kW) permanent magnet motor/generator
- Transmission: 5-speed manual 4-speed automatic 9-speed CVT
- Battery: 3xe: 53.6 kWh lithium-ion
- Electric range: 3xe: 401 kilometres (249 mi) (NEDC)

Dimensions
- Wheelbase: 2,555 mm (100.6 in)
- Length: 4,200 mm (165.4 in)
- Width: 1,760 mm (69.3 in)
- Height: 1,570 mm (61.8 in)

The Chery Tiggo 3x (Chinese: 奇瑞瑞虎3x; pinyin: Qíruì Ruìhǔ 3x) is a subcompact crossover SUV produced by Chery based on the Chery Fulwin 2 hatchback. It is marketed as the Chery Tiggo 2 in some export markets.

== Overview ==
The Chery Tiggo 3x was unveiled on the 2016 Beijing Auto Show, it was the crossover the cheapest product of the Chery Tiggo crossover series. The Chery Tiggo 3X was initially only available with a 1.5-litre petrol engine producing 106 hp and 135 nm, mated to a five-speed manual transmission or a four-speed automatic transmission. A 1.2-litre turbo engine was available from early 2017 producing 150 hp. The 1.2-litre turbo engine is mated to a six-speed manual transmission or CVT. The Tiggo 3x was positioned directly under the Tiggo 3 and was aimed to be the sportier version of the Tiggo 3 despite being a completely different vehicle.

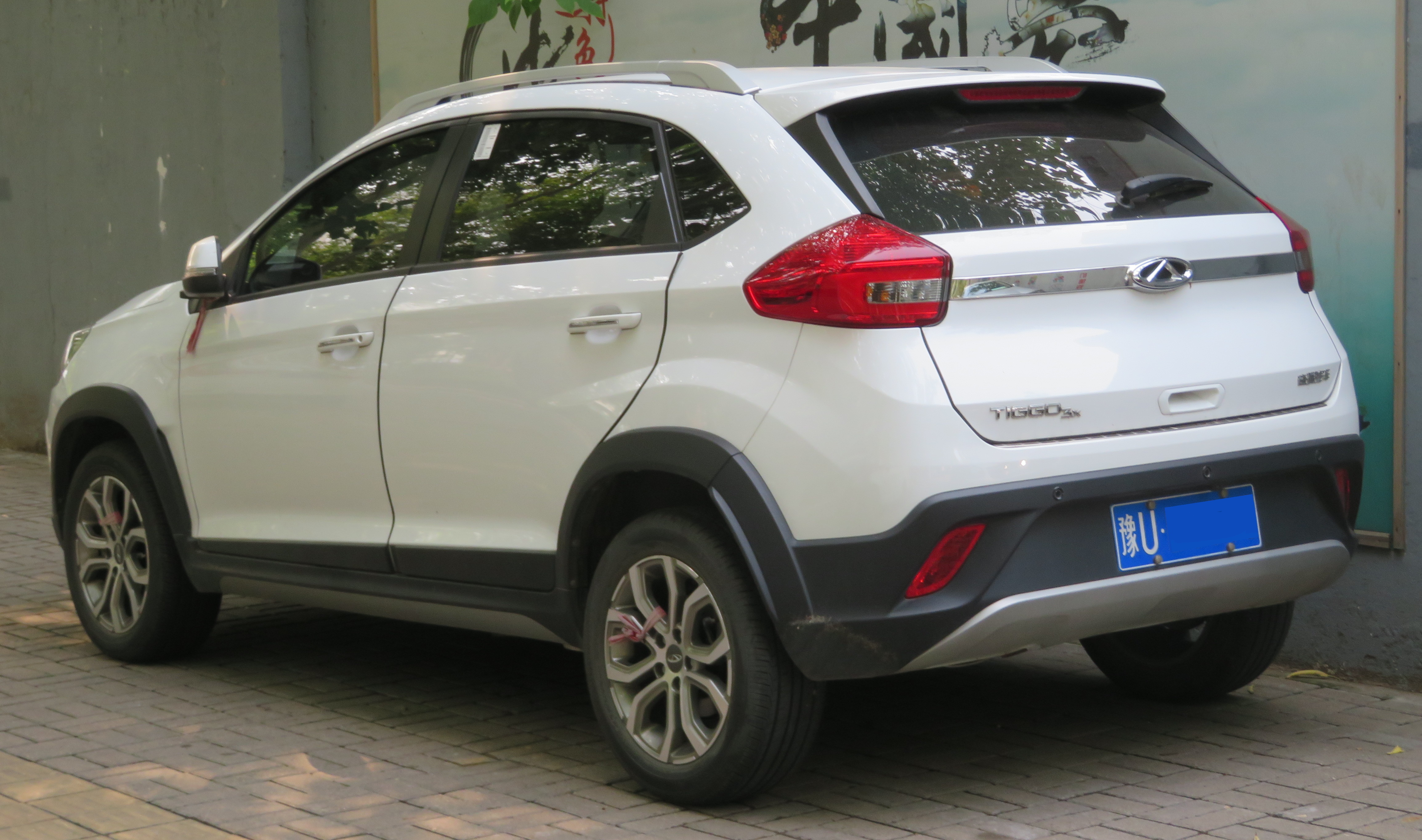
Rear view

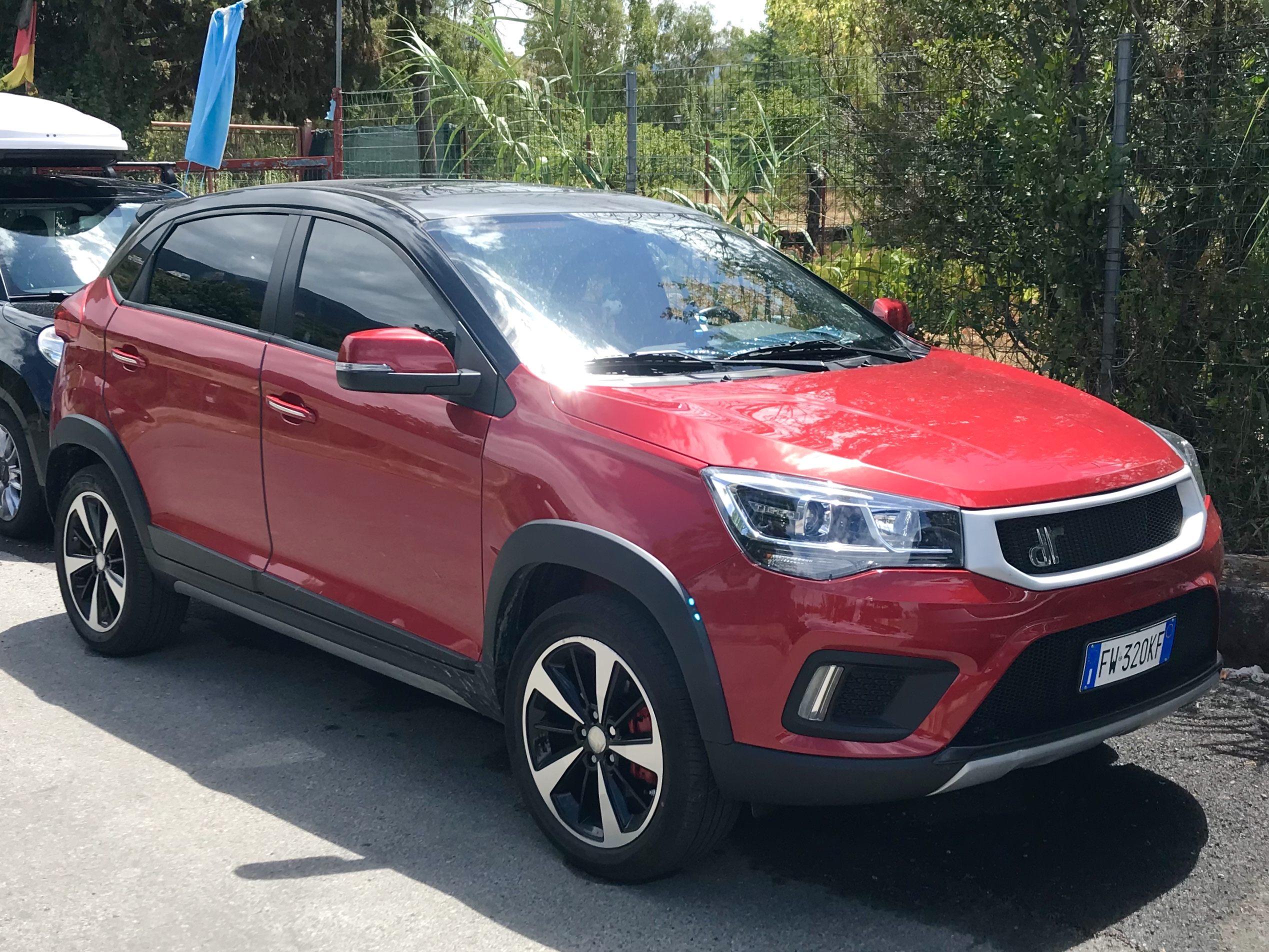
DR3 (Italy)

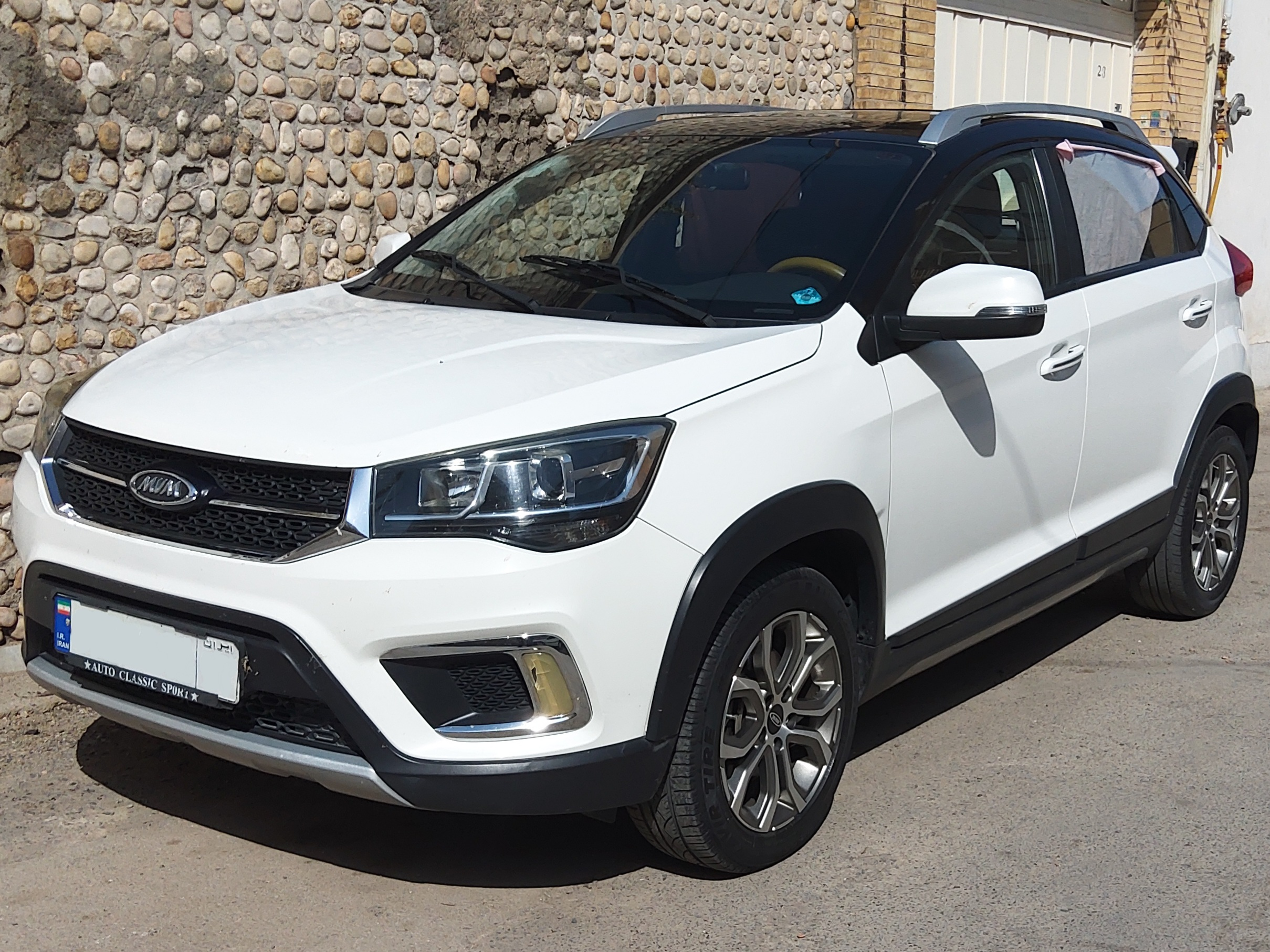
MVM X22 (Iran)

=== Tiggo 3xe (3x EV) ===
The Tiggo 3x EV is based on the Tiggo 3x. Exterior styling remains largely the same with some blue accents in the headlights and a blue line in the grilles. The Tiggo 3x EV is powered by an electric motor with 121 hp (90 kW).

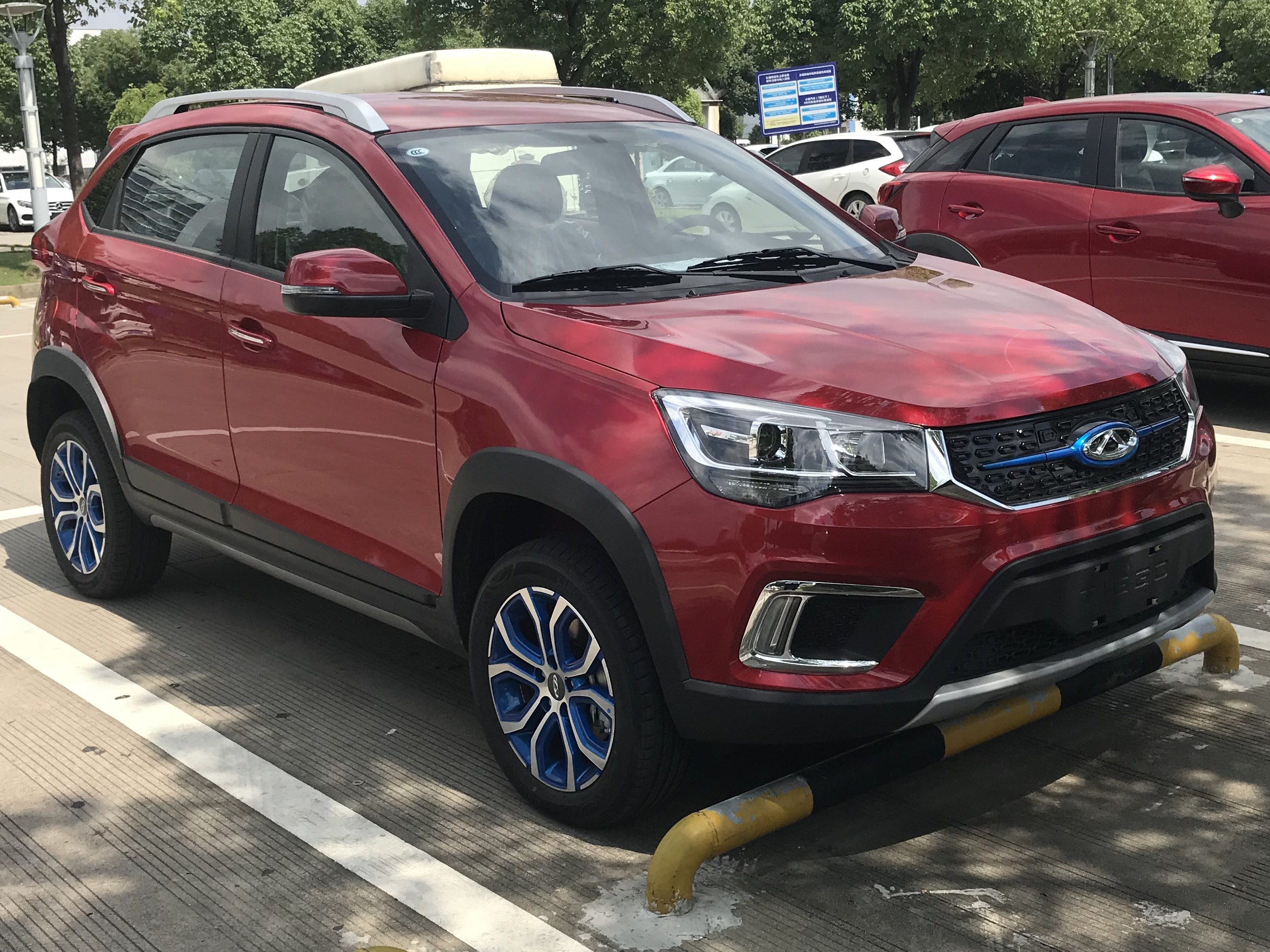
Chery Tiggo 3xe

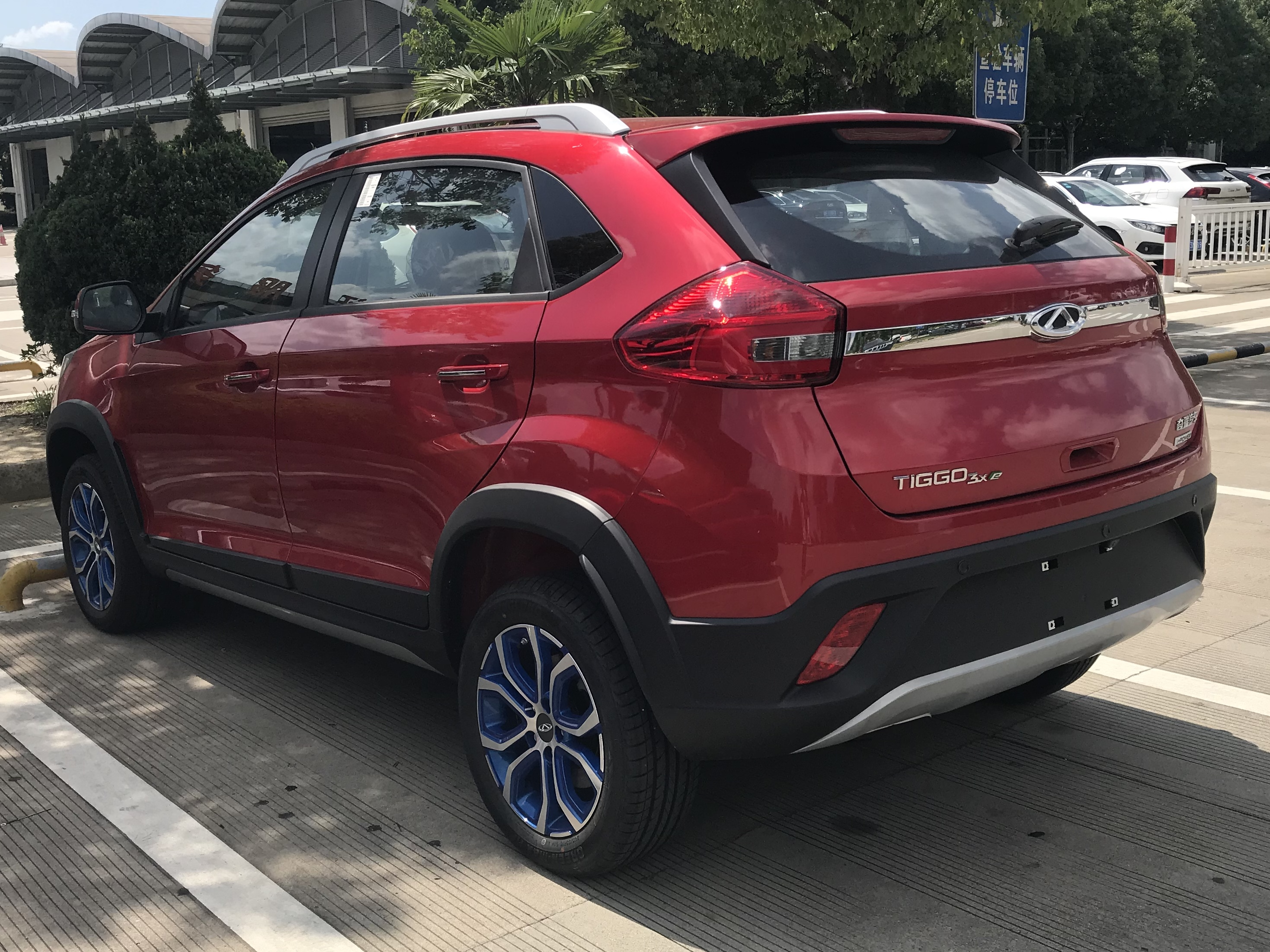
Rear view

=== Safety ===
Latin NCAP 4.0 test results Chirey Tiggo 2 / Tiggo 2 Pro / Tiggo 2 Pro Max + 4 Airbags (2026, similar to Euro NCAP 2019)
Test	Points	%
Overall:	0 /5 stars	
Adult occupant:	0.00	0%
Child occupant:	0.00	0%
Pedestrian:	23.47	49%
Safety assist:	20.00	45%

== Tiggo 3x Plus ==
The Tiggo 3x received a facelift in August 2020 called the Tiggo 3x Plus. The Tiggo 3x Plus features a redesigned front fascia compare to the pre-facelift model. The engine is a 1.5 liter naturally aspirated inline-4 engine developing 85 kW (114 hp; 116 PS) and 143 N⋅m (14.6 kg⋅m; 105 lb⋅ft) mated to either a manual transmission or a CVT. A turbocharged 3-cylinder 1.0-litre engine is used in Brazil, with flex-fuel capability and mated only to the CVT. In Tunisia a version with 1.0 litre engine with only 70 hp is available as The Chery Tiggo 1x

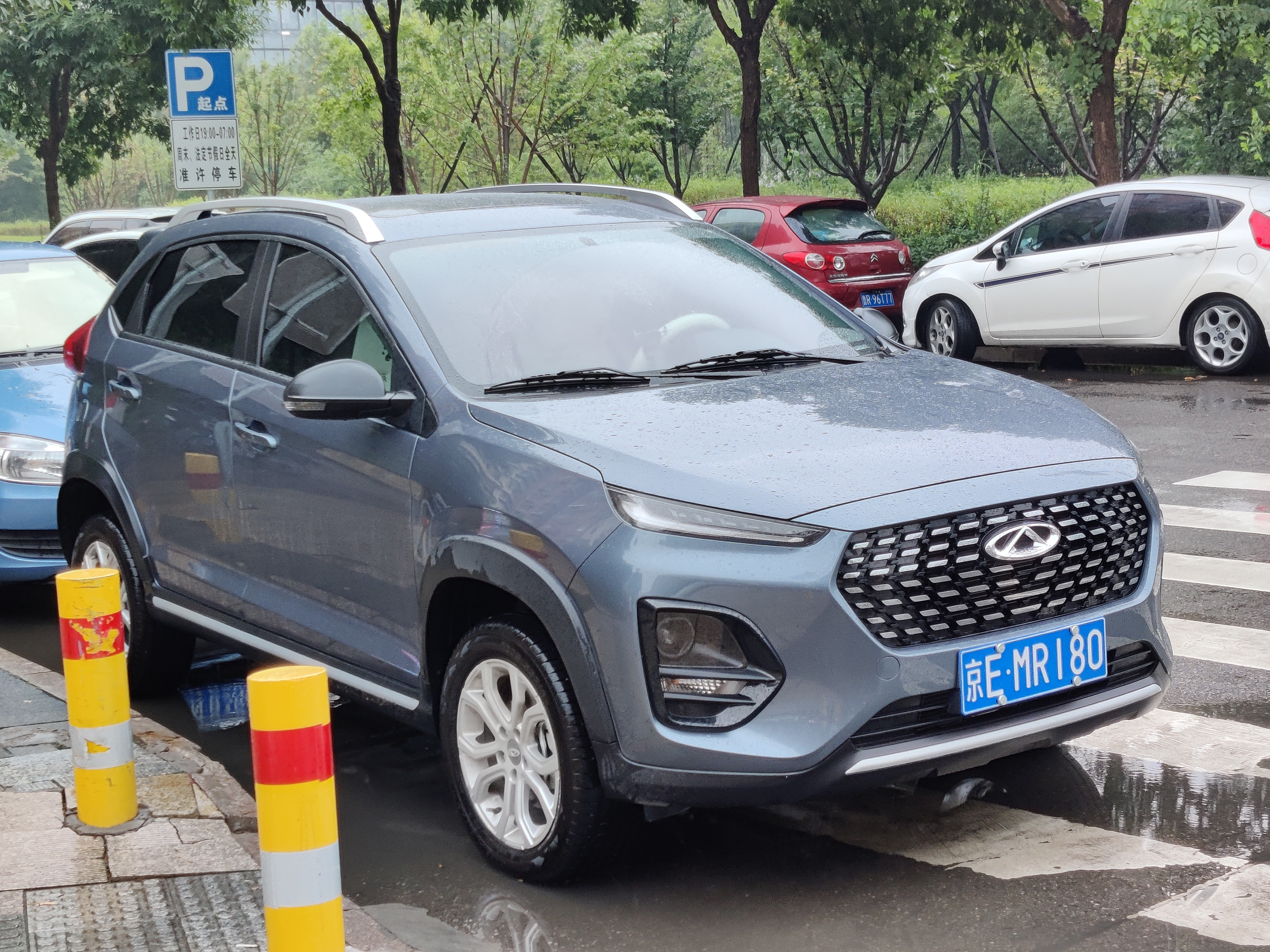
Chery Tiggo 3x Plus

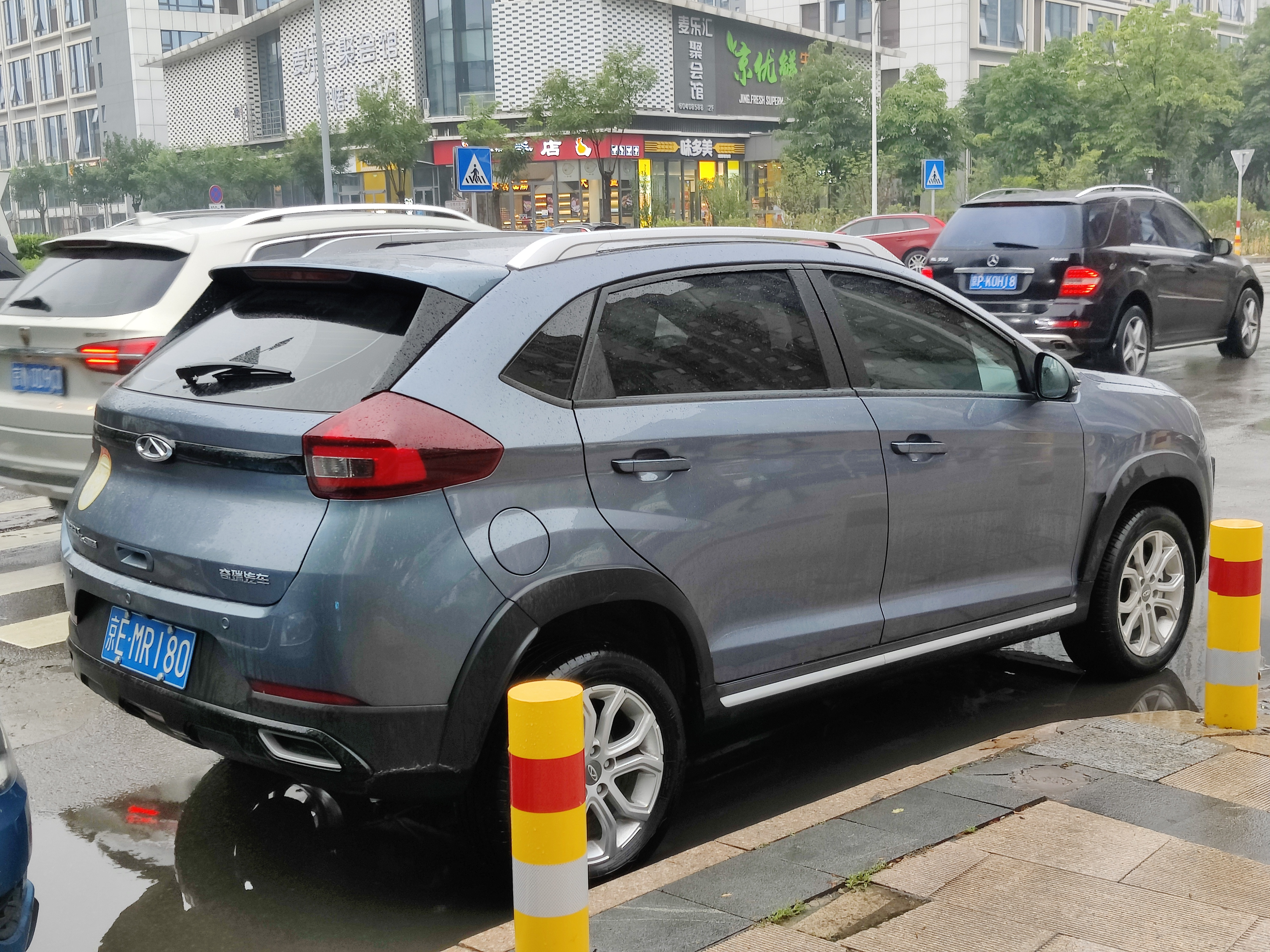
Rear view

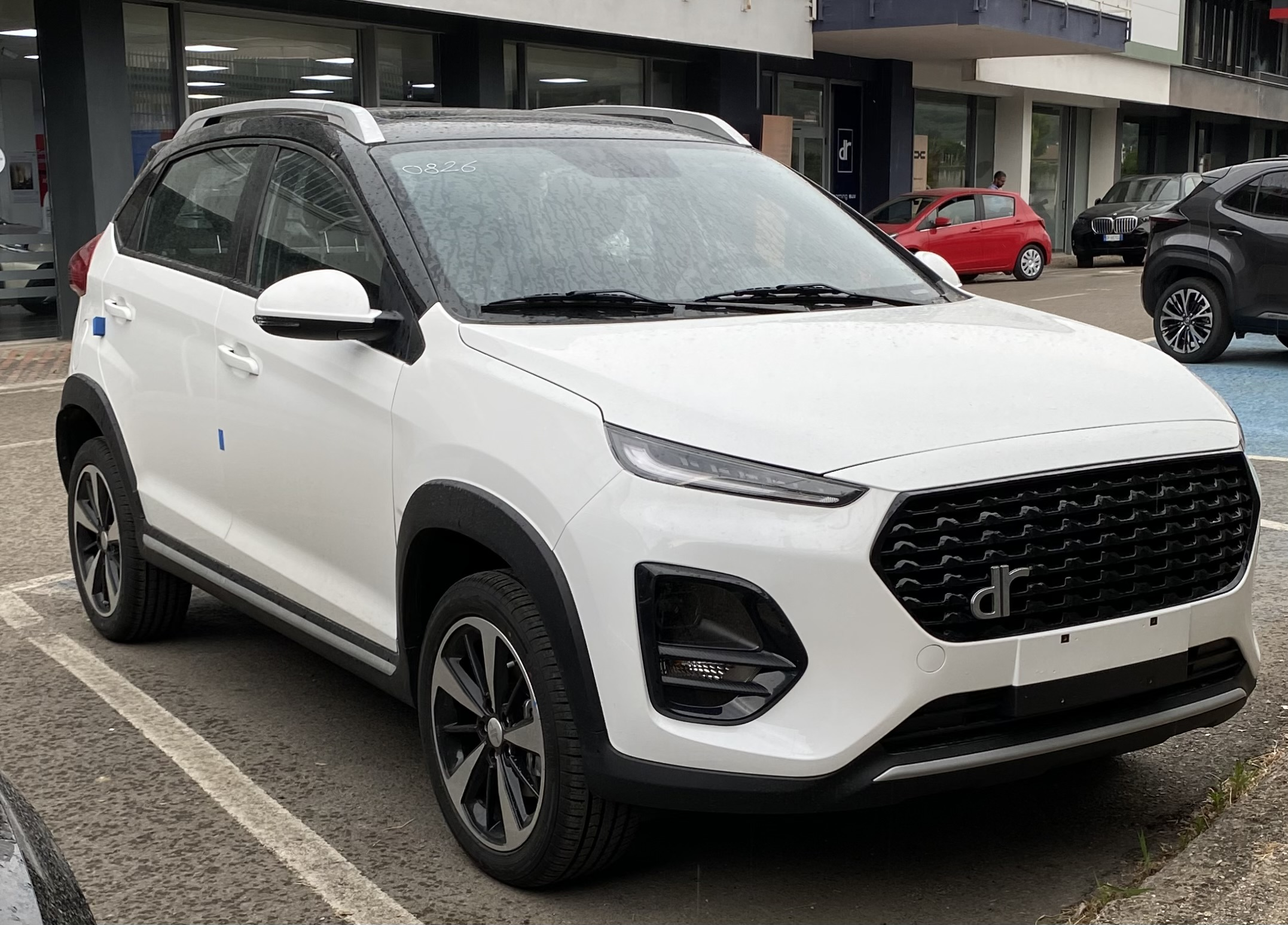
DR 3.0 (Italy)

=== 2023 facelift ===
Launched in May 2023, the Chery Tiggo 3x received another major facelift for the 2023 model year with a redesigned front fascia and rear end. Powertrain is unchanged.

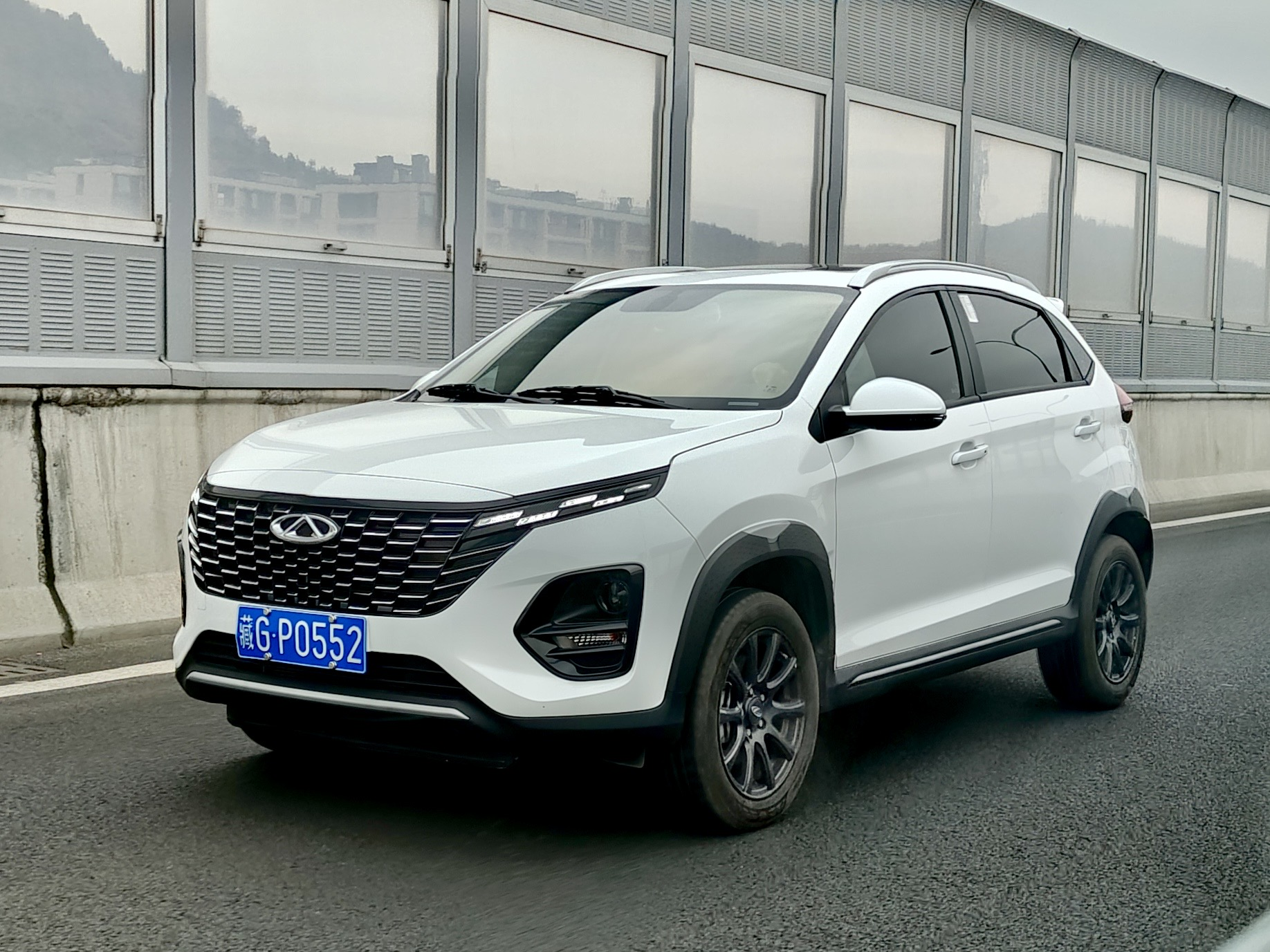
2023 facelift

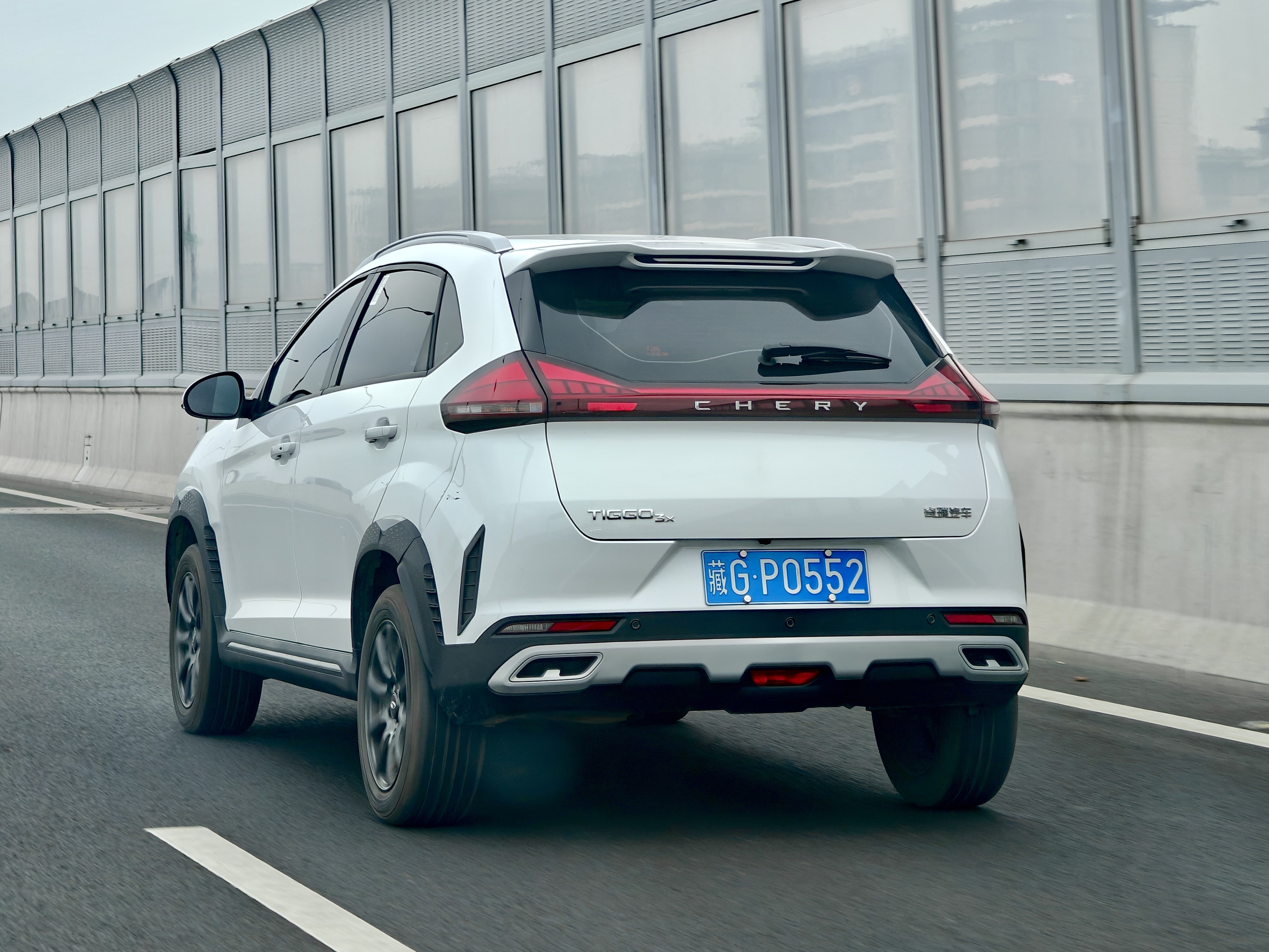
Rear view

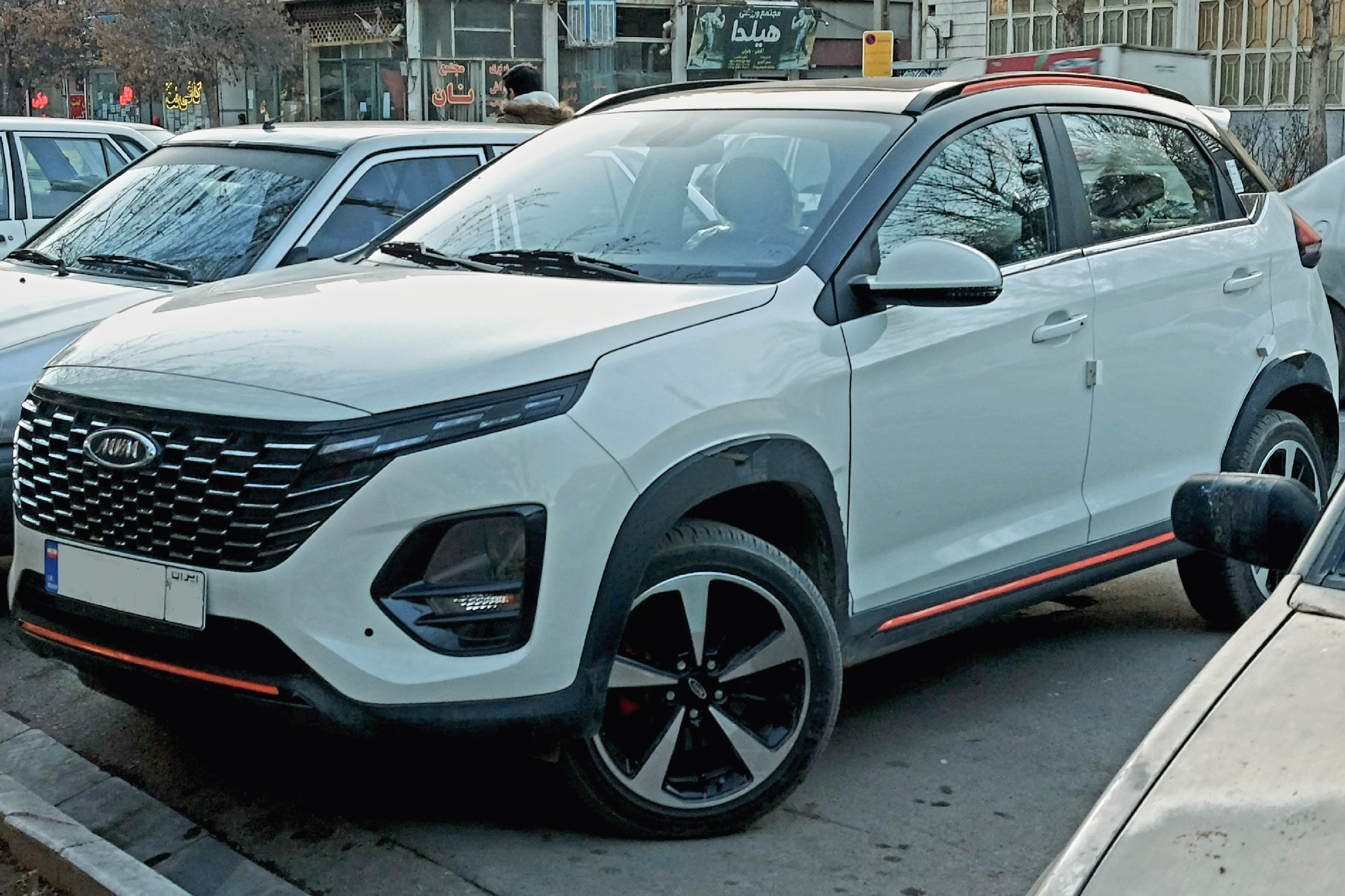
MVM X33 Cross (Iran)

== Sales ==
Year	China	Italy	Brazil	Mexico
2018		236	5,198	—
2019		736	6,250	—
2020		568	4,759	—
2021		1,645	4,123	—
2022		2,280	147	—
2023	18,527		1	4,975
2024	22,498		3	8,938
2025	25,379			
