= Chery Tiggo 9L =

Full-size crossover SUV

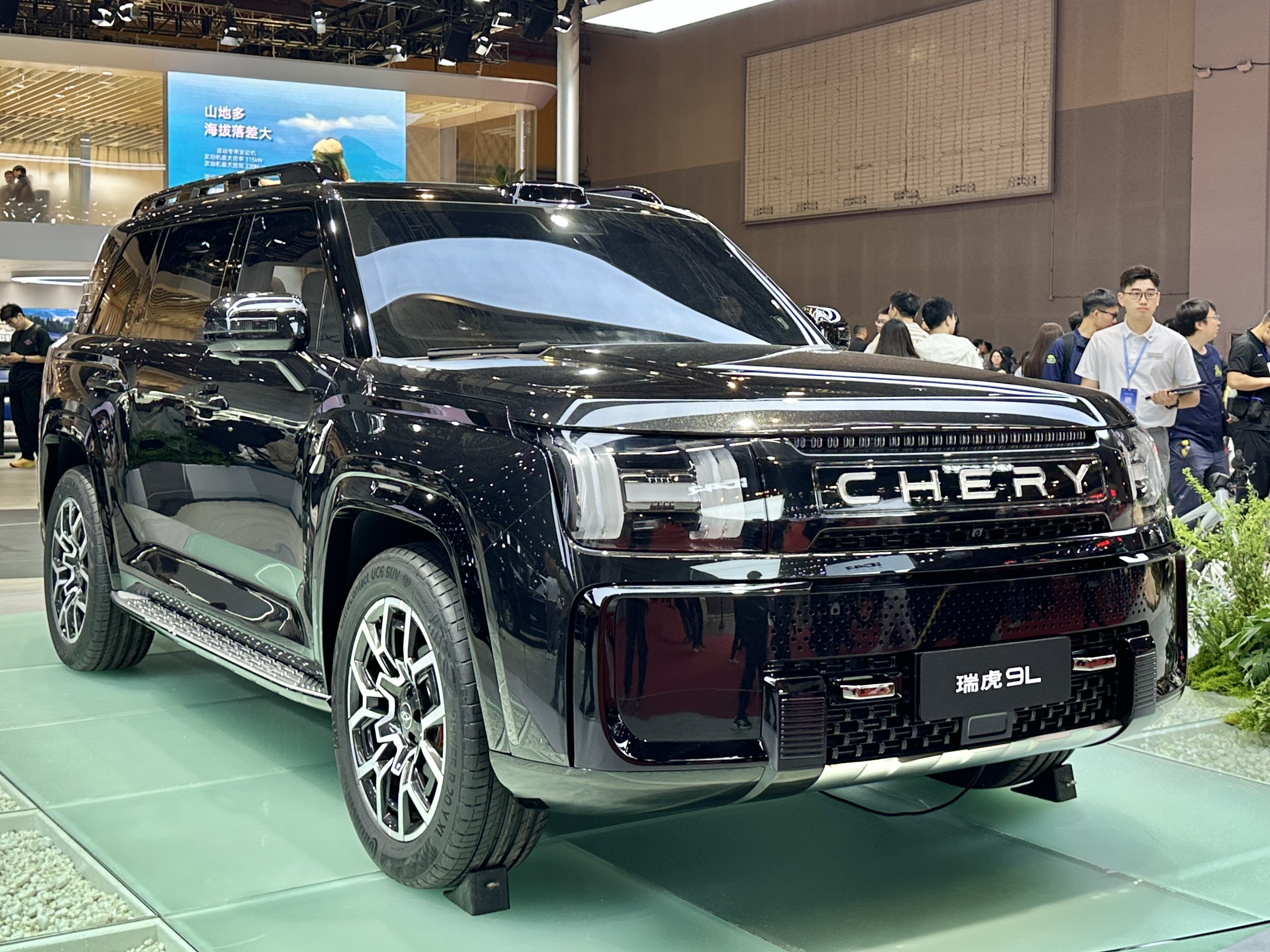

Overview
- Manufacturer: Chery
- Production: 2026 (to commence)
- Assembly: China: Wuhu, Anhui

Body and chassis
- Class: Full-size SUV
- Body style: 5-door crossover SUV
- Chassis: Unibody

The Chery Tiggo 9L (Chinese: 奇瑞瑞虎9L; pinyin: Qíruì Ruìhǔ 9L) is a full-size SUV produced by Chery under the Tiggo product series.

== Overview ==
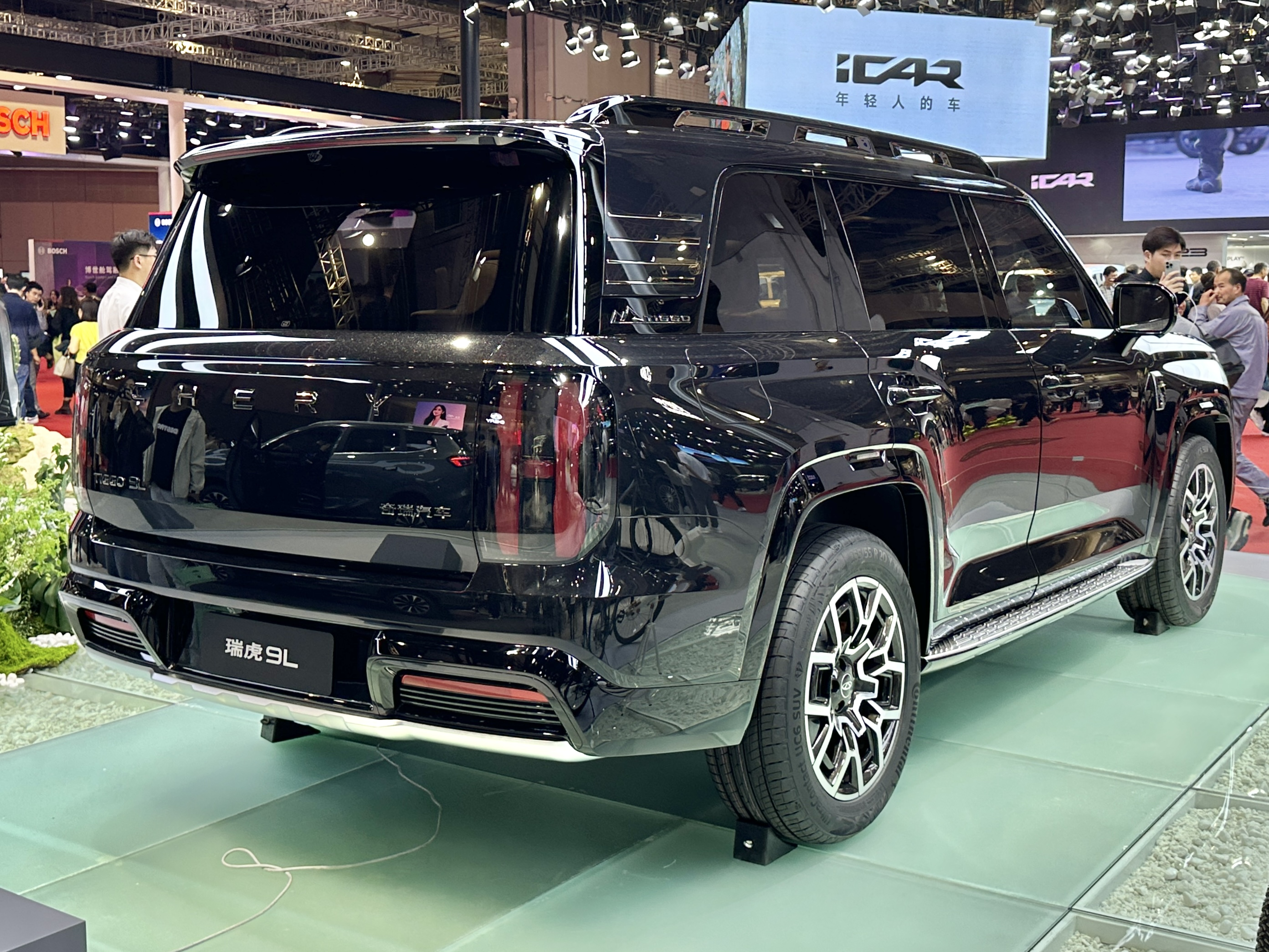
Rear view

The Tiggo 9L was introduced in April 2025 on the 2025 Auto Shanghai.
