= Chery Tiggo V =

Full-size crossover SUV

Overview
- Manufacturer: Chery
- Model code: T1TP
- Production: 2026–present
- Assembly: China: Wuhu, Anhui; Indonesia: Bekasi, West Java (HIM)

Body and chassis
- Class: Full-size SUV
- Body style: 5-door crossover SUV
- Layout: Front-engine, front-motor, front-wheel-drive; Front-engine, front-motor, all-wheel-drive

Powertrain
- Engine: Petrol; Petrol plug-in hybrid
- Electric motor: Permanent magnet synchronous reluctance
- Hybrid drivetrain: Plug-in hybrid

Dimensions
- Wheelbase: 2,800 mm (110.2 in)
- Length: 4,910 mm (193.3 in)
- Width: 1,921 mm (75.6 in)
- Height: 1,790 mm (70.5 in)

The Chery Tiggo V (Chinese: 奇瑞瑞虎V; pinyin: Qíruì Ruìhǔ V), is a full-size SUV produced by Chery under the Tiggo product series. Revealed in April 2026 at the 2026 Beijing Motor Show, it can be converted into a pickup truck. It was first unveiled at the 2025 Chery International User Summit as the Chery T1TP.

== Overview ==
The Tiggo V was revealed during the 2025 Chery International User Summit as the Chery T1TP. A prototype version was unveiled at the 2026 Beijing Motor Show as the Chery Tiggo V.

The Tiggo V will be available in internal combustion engine (ICE), and Chery Super Hybrid options. The Tiggo V combines the characteristics of an SUV, an MPV, and a utility vehicle, specifically a double-cab pickup, into a single model.

Sales will begin in November 2026, at the 2026 Gaikindo Auto Week, and Indonesia will be the first country to officially sell it.
