= Chery Tiggo 5 =

Car model

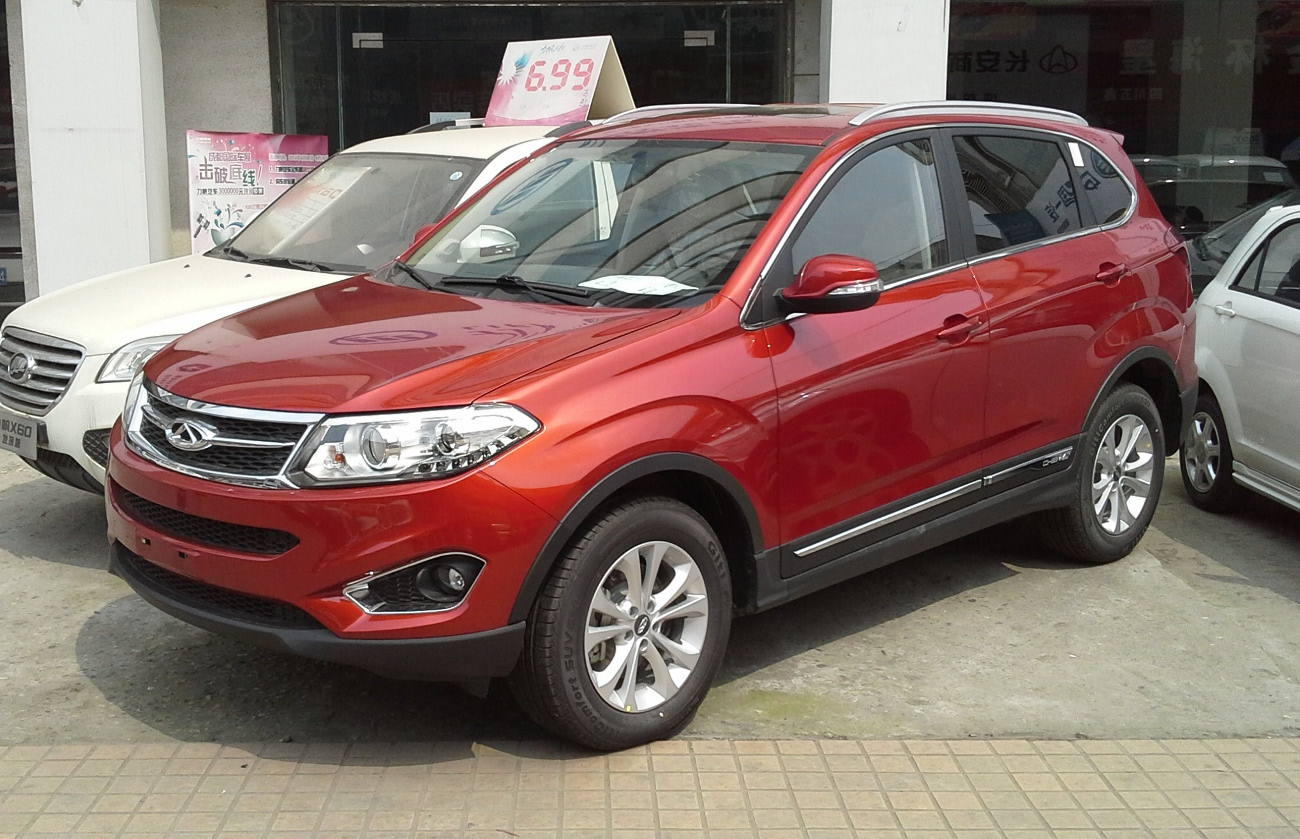

Overview
- Manufacturer: Chery
- Also called: Cowin X5; Cowin 5 SUV; Chery Grand Tiggo; DR6 (Italy); EVO6 (Italy)
- Production: 2013–2021
- Assembly: Wuhu, Anhui, China; Yibin, Sichuan, China; Bam, Kerman Province, Iran (MVM)

Body and chassis
- Class: Subcompact crossover SUV (B)
- Body style: 5-door SUV
- Layout: Front-engine, front-wheel-drive; Front-engine, four-wheel-drive

Powertrain
- Engine: 1.5 L SQRE4T15 I4 (gasoline) turbo; 2.0 L SQR484F I4 (gasoline)
- Transmission: 5-speed manual; CVT

Dimensions
- Wheelbase: 2,610 mm (102.8 in)
- Length: 4,506 mm (177.4 in)
- Width: 1,841 mm (72.5 in)
- Height: 1,740 mm (68.5 in)

Chronology
- Successor: Chery Tiggo 5x (numerical)

The Chery Tiggo 5 (Chinese: 奇瑞瑞虎5; pinyin: Qíruì Ruìhǔ 5) is a subcompact crossover SUV produced by Chery under the Tiggo product series.

== Overview ==
The Chery Tiggo 5 was launched in November 2013 on the 2013 Guangzhou Auto Show. The Chery Tiggo 5 was later launched in China on November 28, pricing starts around 100,000 yuan to 150,000 yuan. The Tiggo 5 is slightly larger and is positioned above the Chery Tiggo 3 compact crossover.

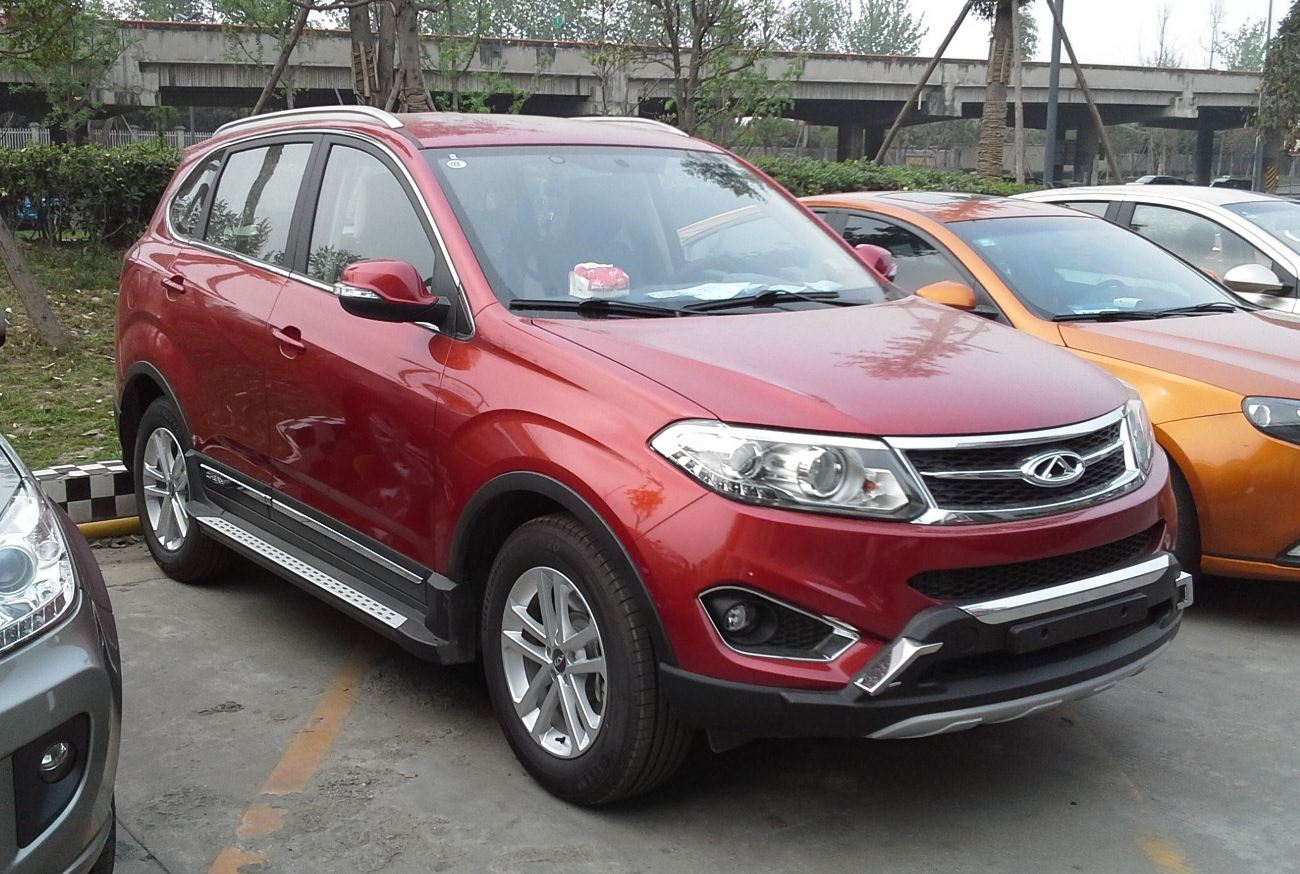
Chery Tiggo 5 higher trim front

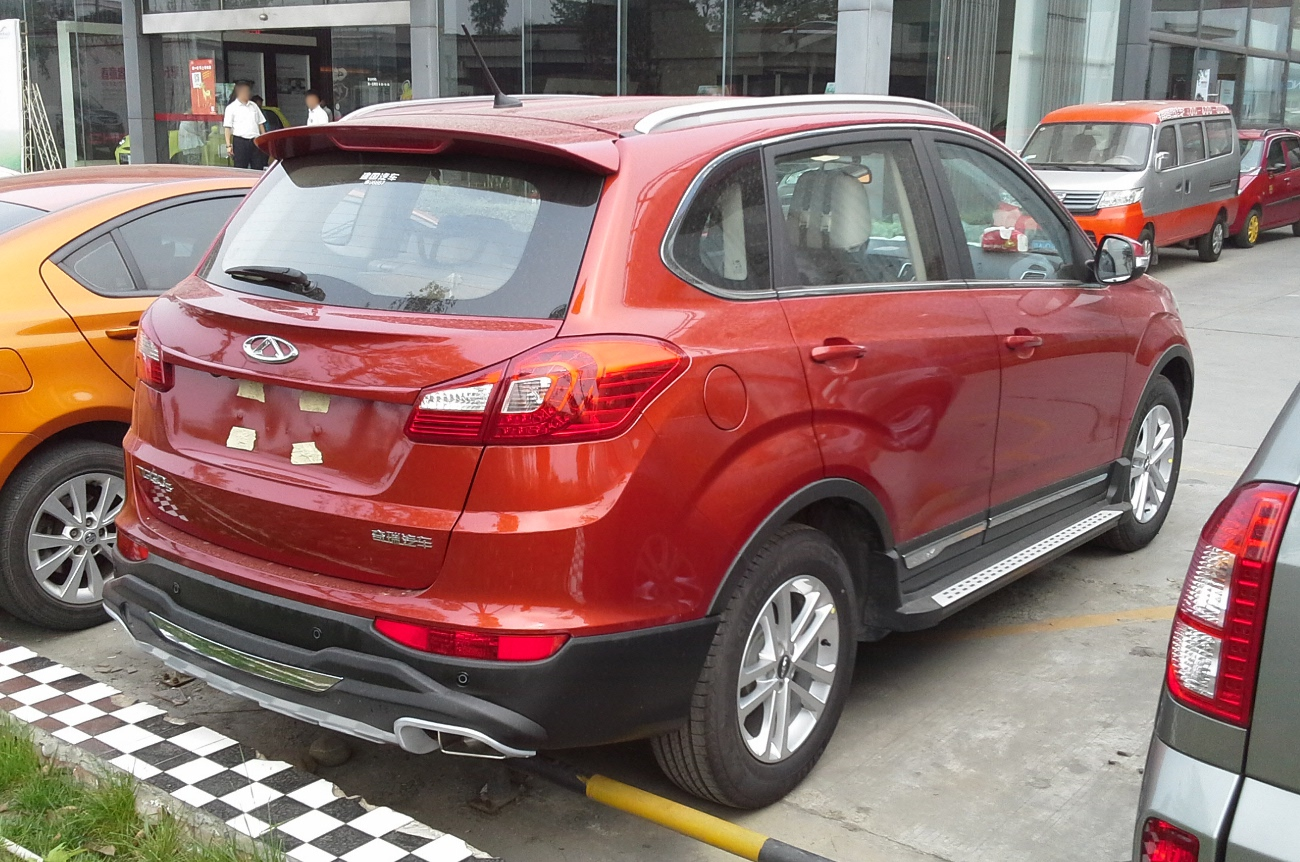
Chery Tiggo 5 higher trim rear

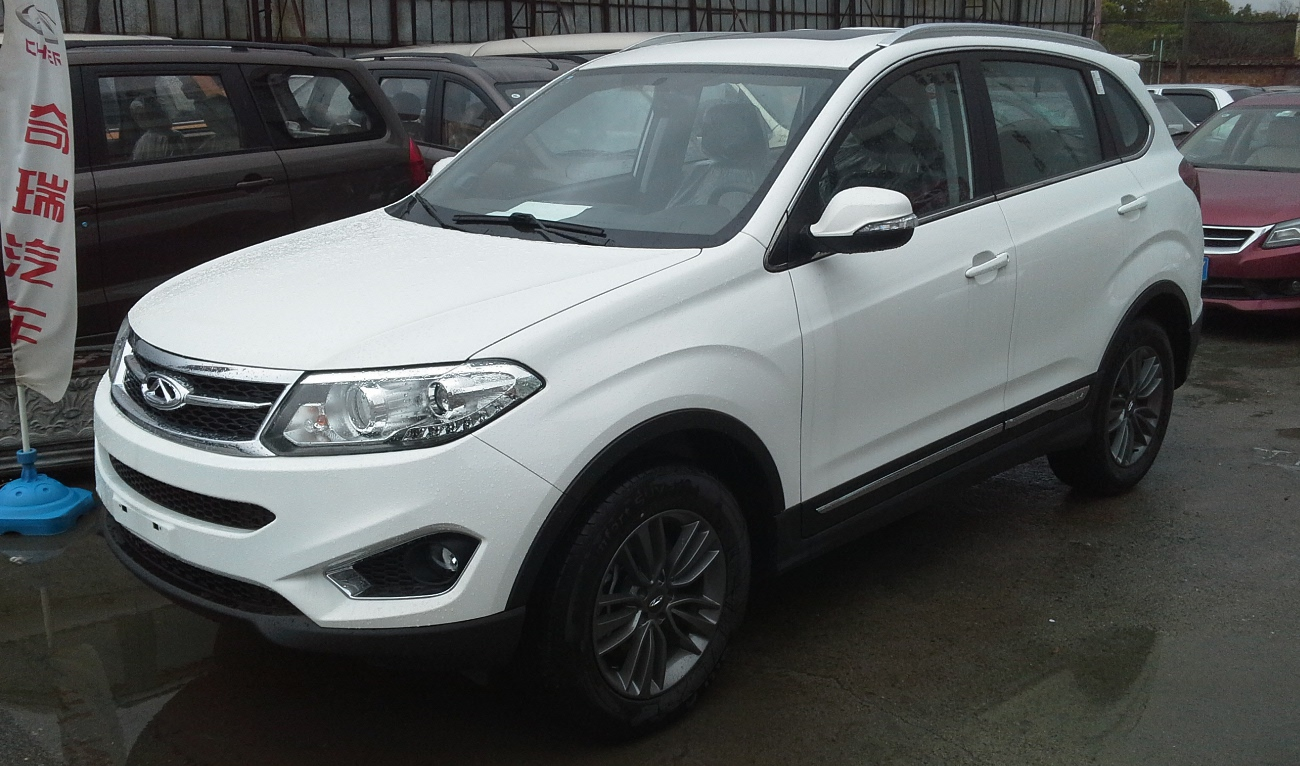
Chery Tiggo 5 lower trim front

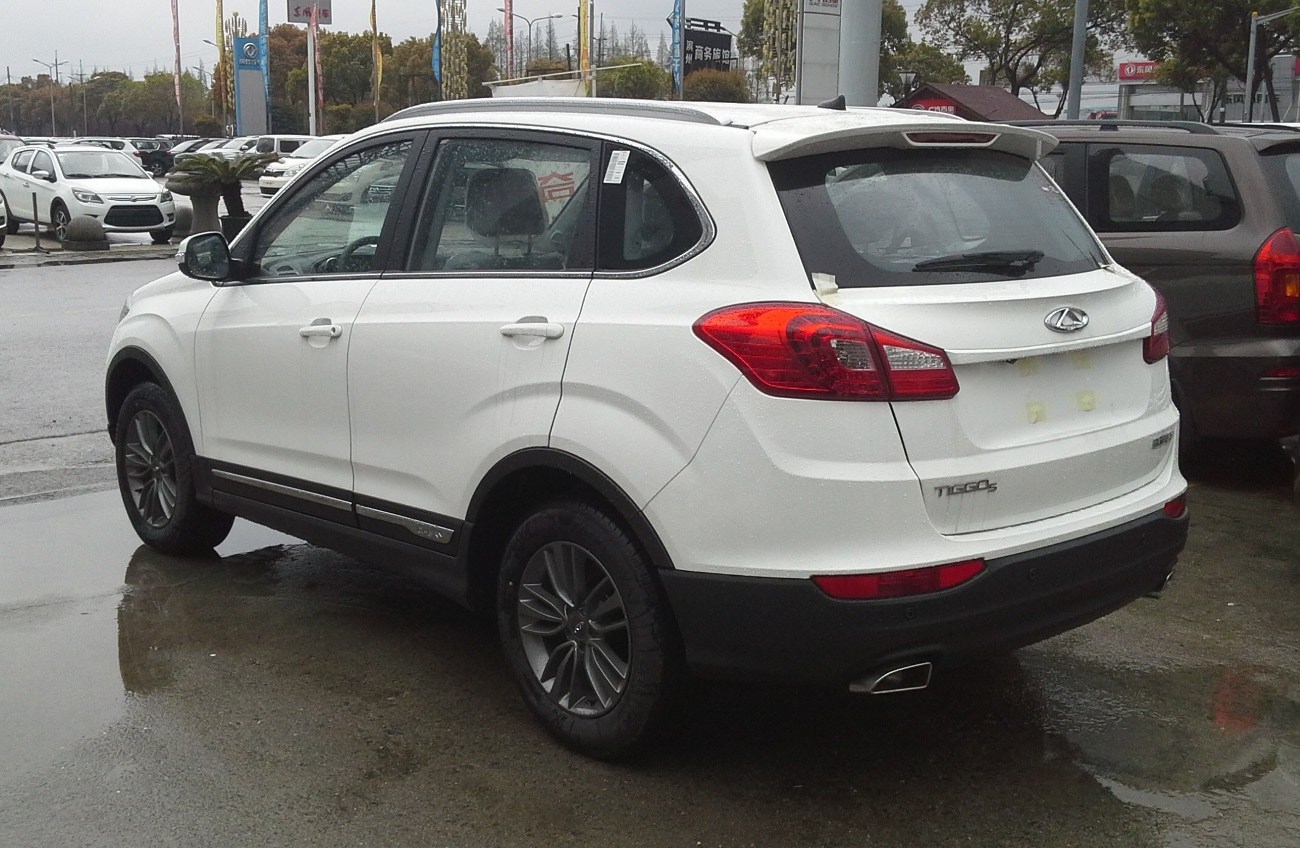
Chery Tiggo 5 lower trim rear

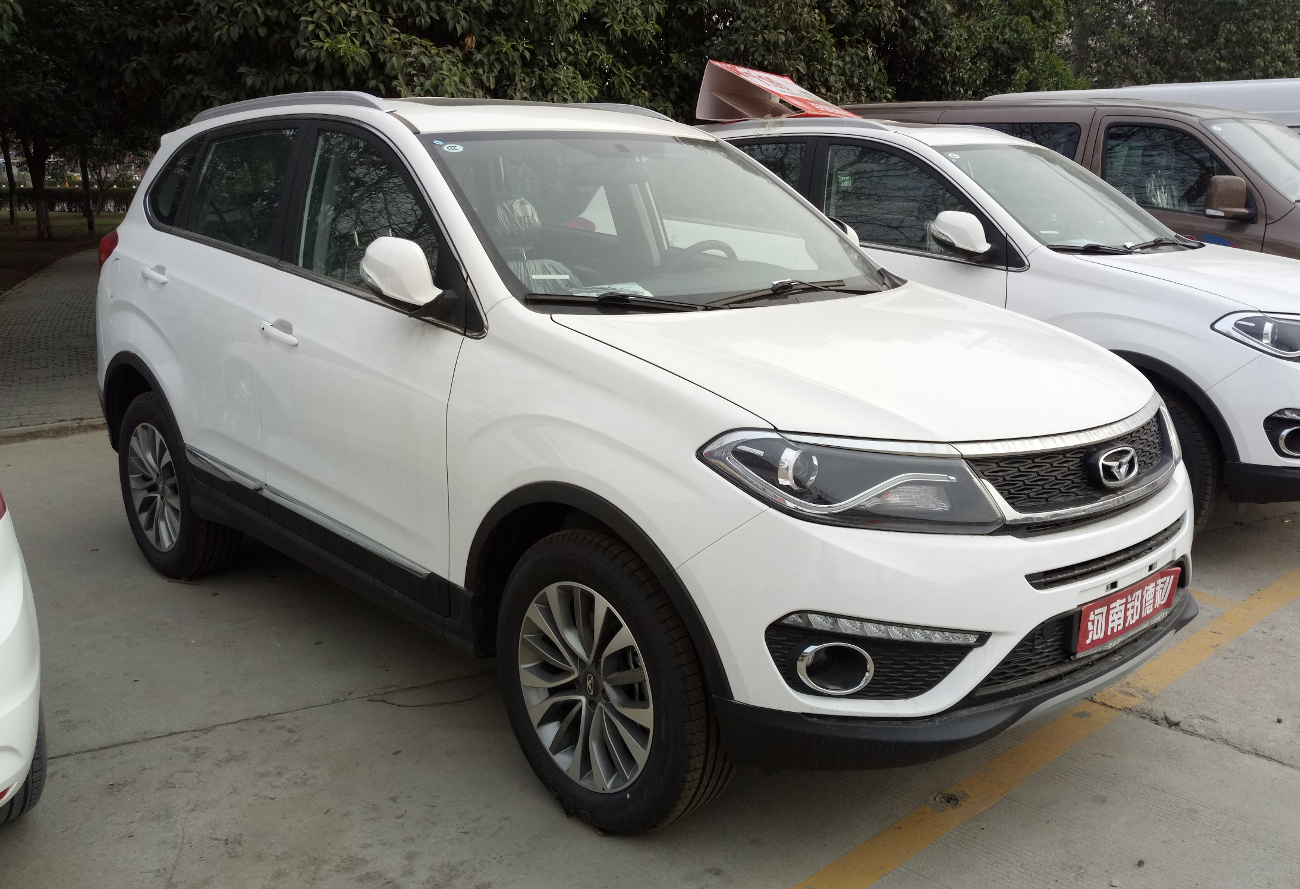
Cowin X5

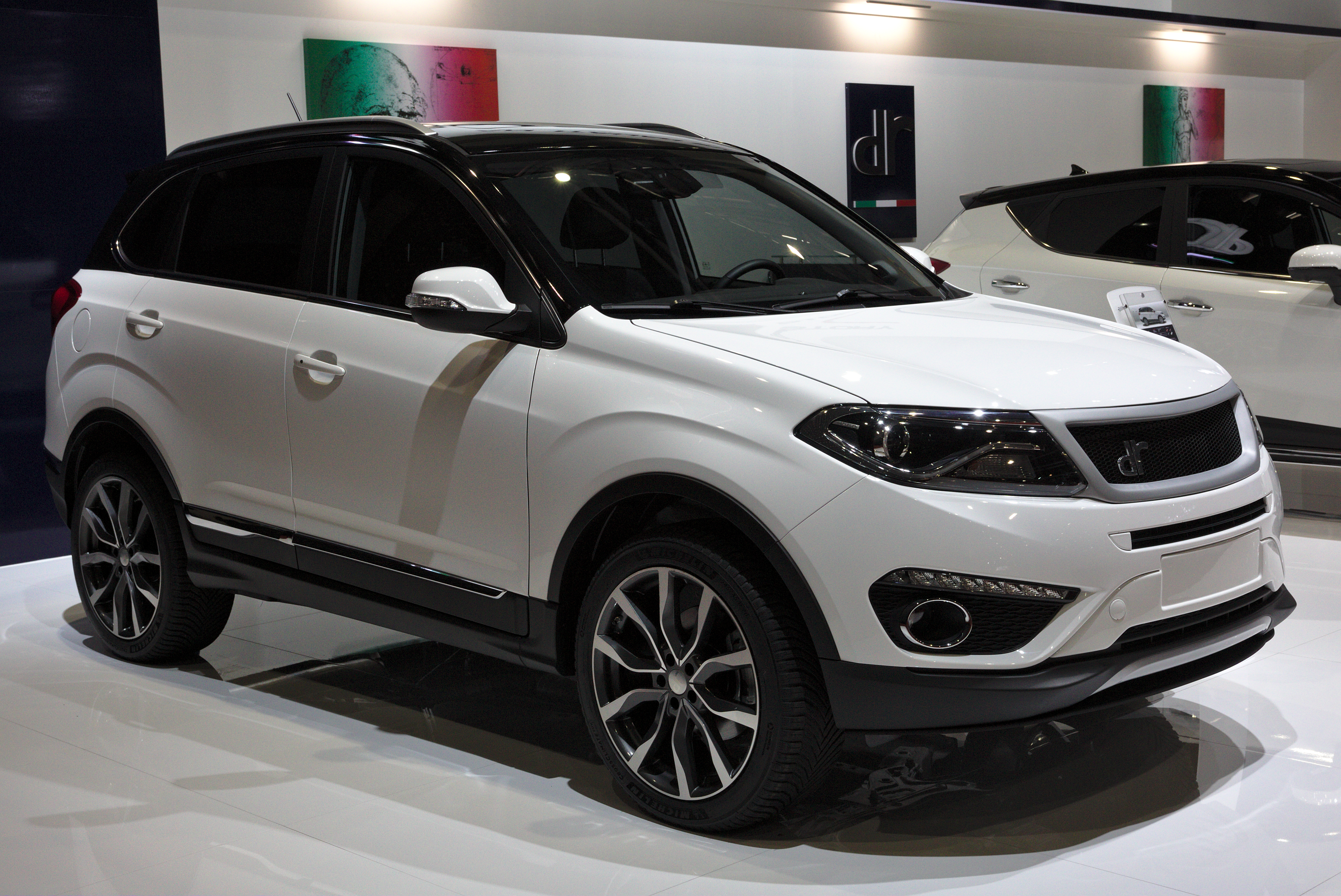
DR6 front

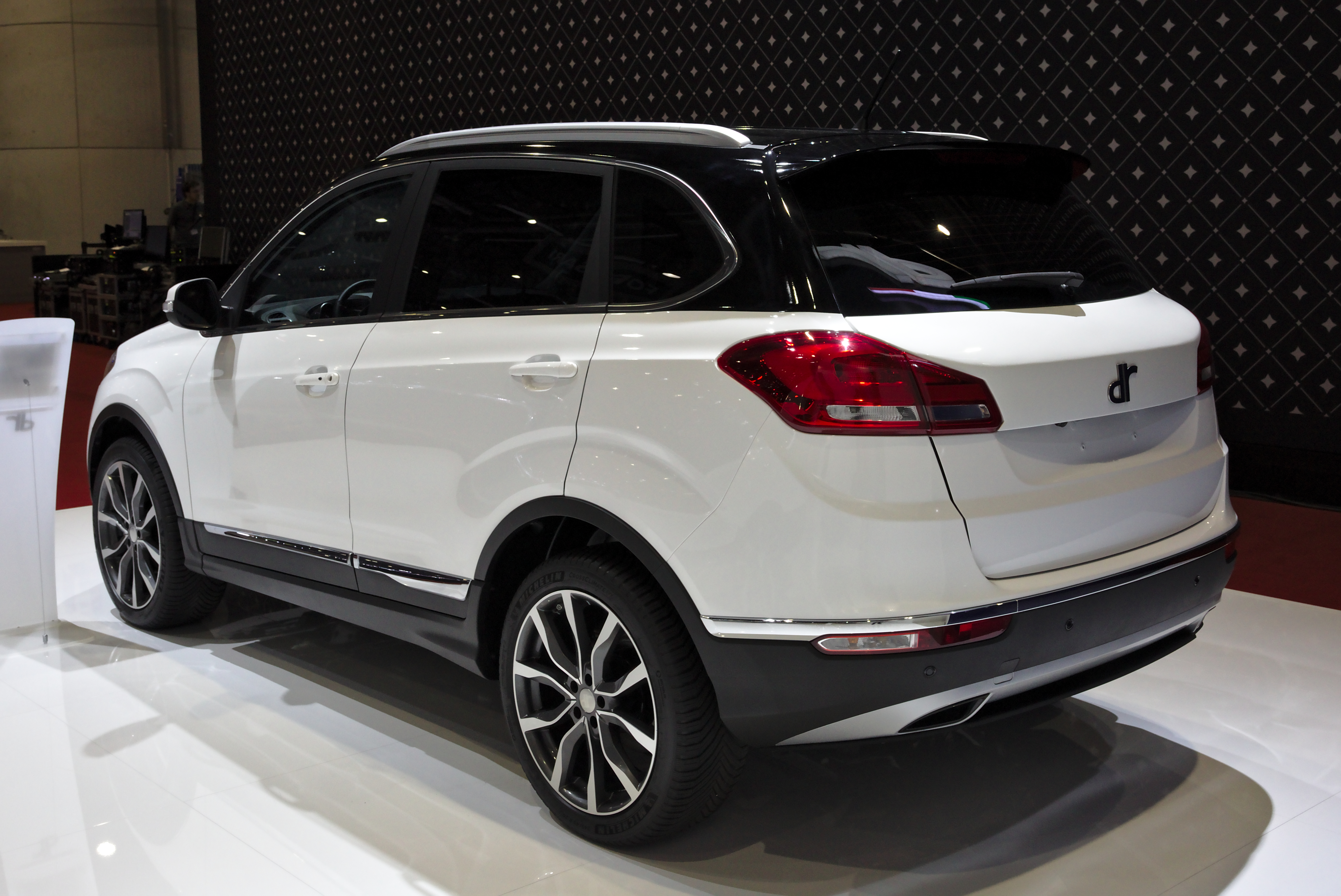
DR6 rear

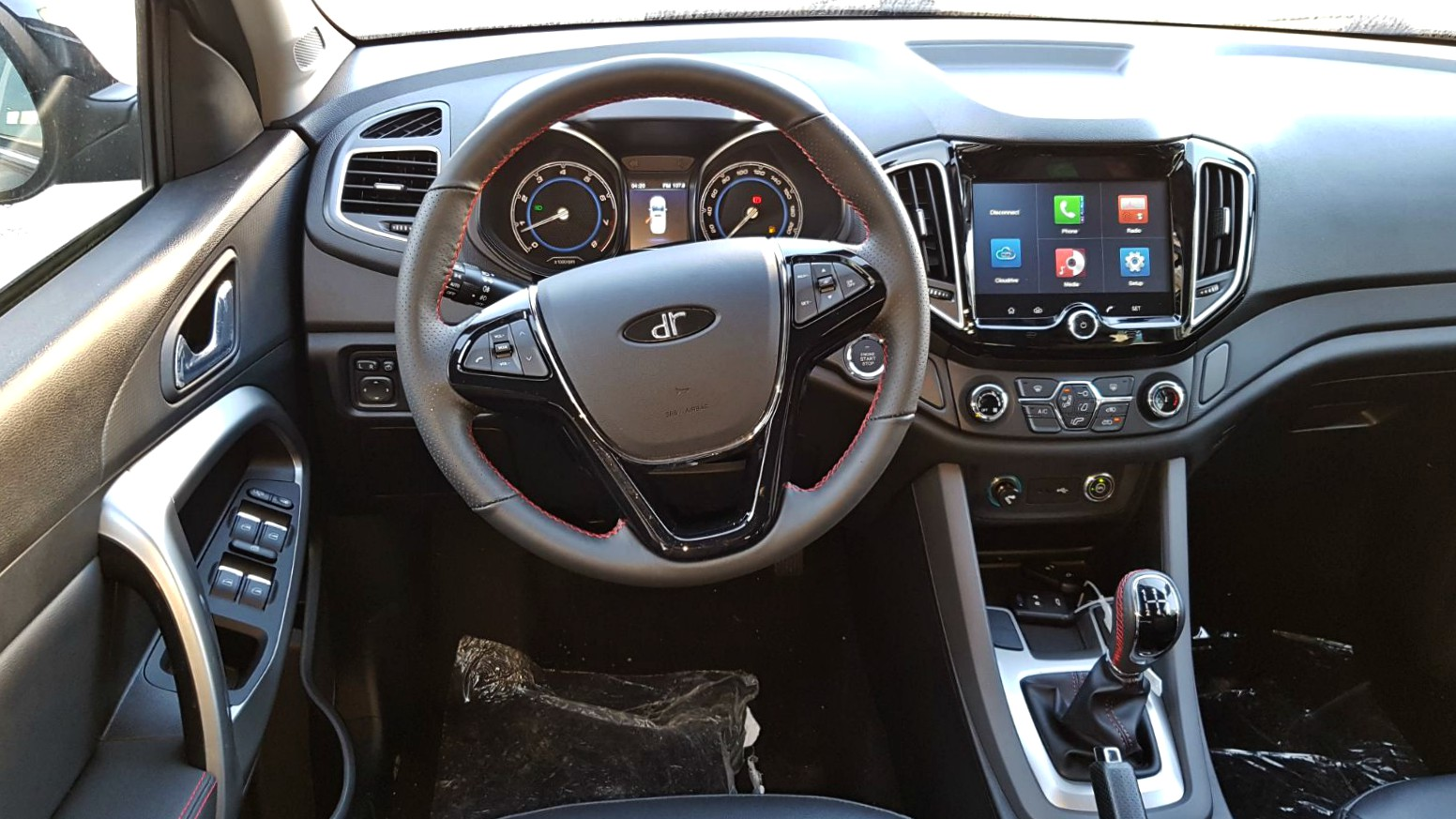
DR6 interior
