= Chery Tiggo =

Series of crossover SUVs by Chery

The Chery Tiggo (Chinese: 奇瑞瑞虎; pinyin: Qíruì Ruìhǔ) is a series of crossover SUVs produced by the Chinese manufacturer Chery Automobile since 2005. The first model, Tiggo 3 was originally named Tiggo, while the slightly larger Tiggo 5 was later launched in November 2013.

== Models ==
=== Current models ===
| Image | Name(s) | Also called (italics for export names) | Introduction (cal. year) | Generation | Code | Description |
|---|---|---|---|---|---|---|
| | Tiggo 3x | Chery Tiggo 2; Chery Tiggo 1X; Omoda 3 | 2016 | First | T13 | Subcompact SUV based on the Chery A13. |
| | Tiggo 5x | Chery Tiggo 3; Chery Tiggo 4; Chery Tiggo Cross | 2017 | First | T17 | Subcompact SUV. Available with mild hybrid powertrain. |
| | Tiggo 5x High Energy | Chery Omoda 5; Chery Tiggo 5 Sport; Chery C5; Chery FX; Omoda C5; Omoda 5 | 2024 | First | T34 | Subcompact SUV, renamed and redesigned Chery Omoda 5 in China. |
| | Tiggo 6 | Chery eQ7 (China) | 2024 | First | S61 | BEV compact SUV using an aluminum-magnesium platform, based on the discontinued eQ5. |
| | Tiggo 7 | - | 2016 | Second | T1E | Compact SUV. Various styling are sold at the same time depending on the variant, powertrain, and market. Available with PHEV powertrain. |
| | Tiggo 7 High Energy | Chery Tansuo 06; Chery Fulwin T6; Jaecoo J7 | 2024 | First | T1EJ | Compact SUV, renamed and redesigned Chery Tansuo 06 in China. |
| | Tiggo 7L | Omoda C7; Omoda 7 | 2026 | First | T1GC | Compact SUV. |
| | Tiggo 8 | Chery Tiggo Grand Tour; Chery Fulwin T8 | 2018 | First | T1D | Three-row mid-size SUV, Various styling are sold at the same time depending on the variant, powertrain, and market. Available with PHEV powertrain. |
| | Tiggo 8 (2nd) | Lepas L8; Chery Fulwin T8L | 2025 | First | T1G | Two-row compact SUV. |
| | Tiggo 9X | Chery Tiggo 9; Chery Tiggo 8L (until 2026); Chery Fulwin T9 | 2024 | First | T28 | Mid-size SUV between the Tiggo 8 and Chinese market Tiggo 9, exported as the Tiggo 9. Available with C-DM PHEV powertrain. |
| | Tiggo 9 | Jaecoo J8; Chery Fulwin T10 | 2023 | First | T26 | Three-row mid-size SUV. Not to be confused with the global market Tiggo 9. |
| | Tiggo 9L | - | upcoming | First | | Three-row full-size SUV. Only shares similar naming with Tiggo 9. |
| | Tiggo V | - | Upcoming | First | T1TP | Full-size SUV convertible to a pickup truck |

=== Discontinued models ===
| Image | Name | Also called (italics for export names) | Introduction (cal. year) | End of production (cal. year) | Generation | Code | Class |
|---|---|---|---|---|---|---|---|
| | Tiggo | Chery J11 | 2005 | 2014 | First | T11 | Subcompact SUV |
| | Tiggo 3 | Chery J11 | 2014 | 2023 | First | T11 | Subcompact SUV |
| | Tiggo 5 | Cowin X5; Chery Grand Tiggo | 2013 | 2021 | First | T21 | Subcompact SUV |
| | Tiggo 7 (first generation) | Chery Tiggo 7 Fly; Qoros Young | 2016 | 2020 | First | T15 | Compact SUV |
