= Chery Tiggo 3 =

Compact crossover SUV

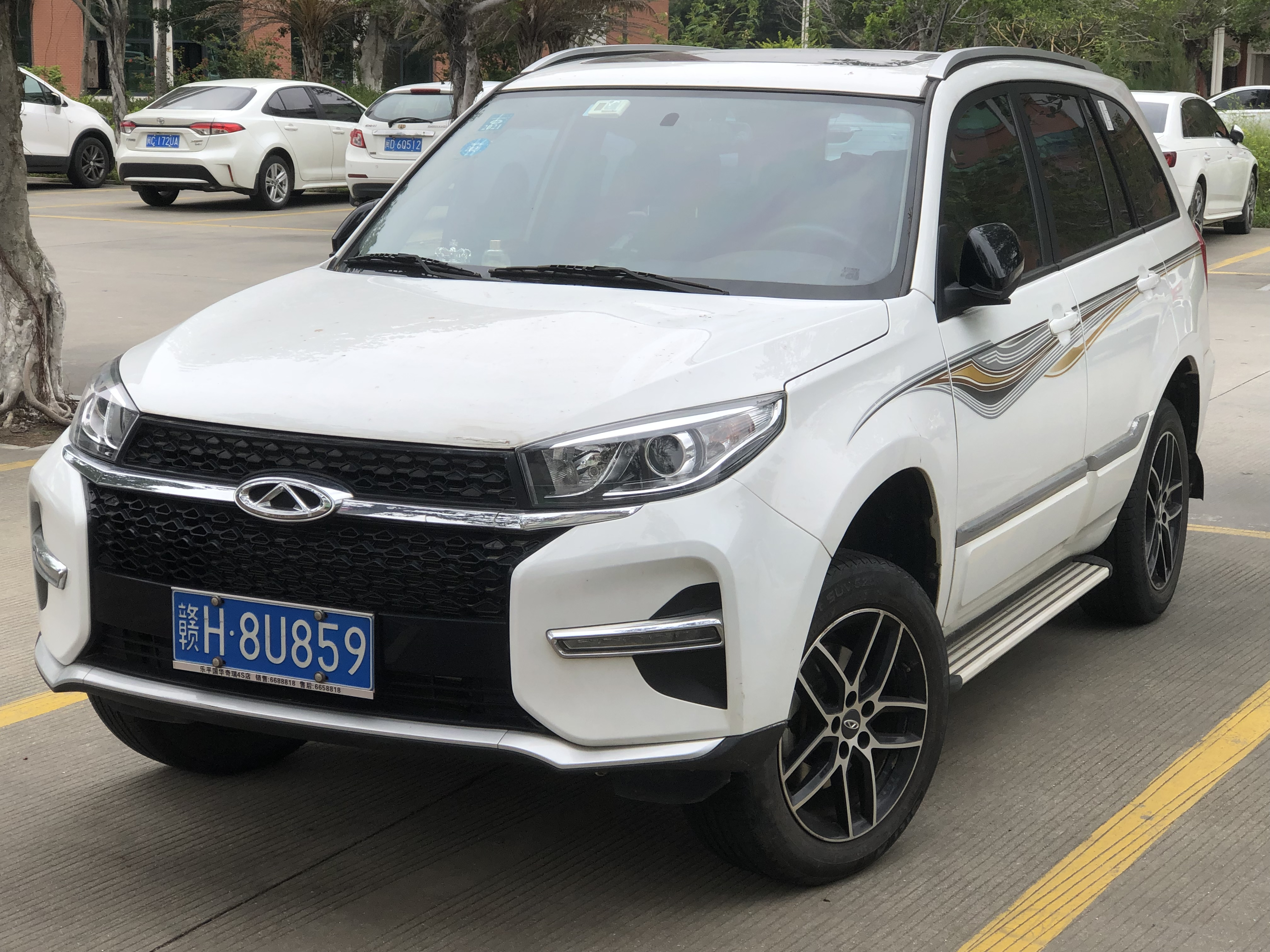

Overview
- Manufacturer: Chery
- Also called: DR Motor DR5 (Italy); DR EVO5 (Italy); Chery J11 (Australia); Chery T11 (Singapore); Matchedje V3; MVM X33/X33S (Iran); Speranza Tiggo (Egypt); Vortex Tingo (Russia)
- Production: 2005–2023
- Assembly: Wuhu, Anhui, China; Cairo, Egypt (Speranza); Barra de Carrasco, Uruguay (2007 to 2015); Kaliningrad, Russia (Avtotor, 2006 to 2008); Jakarta, Indonesia (Unicor Prima Motor); Taganrog, Russia (TagAZ, 2005-2014); Kerman, Iran (Modiran)

Body and chassis
- Class: Compact crossover
- Body style: 5-door SUV
- Layout: Front-engine, front-wheel-drive or four-wheel-drive

Powertrain
- Engine: 1.5 L SQRE4T15 I4 (gasoline) turbo 1.5 L SQRE4T15B I4 (gasoline) turbo 1.6 L SQRE4G16 I4 (gasoline); 1.6 L SQRE481FG I4 (gasoline) turbo 1.8 L SQRE481FC I4 (gasoline); 2.0 L SQR484F I4 (gasoline); 2.0 L SQRD4G20 I4 (gasoline)
- Transmission: 6-speed manual 5-speed manual 5-speed automatic 7-speed automatic CVT; 6 speed DCG; 9-speed automatic CVT

Dimensions
- Wheelbase: 2,510 mm (98.8 in)
- Length: 4,285 mm (168.7 in); 4,420 mm (174.0 in) (2020)
- Width: 1,765 mm (69.5 in); 1,760 mm (69.3 in) (2020)
- Height: 1,705 mm (67.1 in); 1,670 mm (65.7 in) (2020)

Chronology
- Successor: Chery Tiggo 4/5x (in South America and Italy

The Chery Tiggo 3 (Chinese: 奇瑞瑞虎3; pinyin: Qíruì Ruìhǔ 3), or originally the Chery Tiggo (Chinese: 奇瑞瑞虎; pinyin: Qíruì Ruìhǔ), is a compact crossover produced by the Chinese manufacturer Chery from 2005 to 2023. The original Tiggo debuted at the 2005 Shanghai Motor Show and was called the NCV, meaning New Concept Vehicle. It is the first product of the Chery Tiggo series. The original vehicle was facelifted in September 2010, and received the name change to Tiggo 3 and another facelift in 2014.

== Overview ==
Launched in 2005, the original Tiggo crossover has many styling cues which resemble other compact crossovers, mainly the Toyota RAV4 and the Honda CR-V.

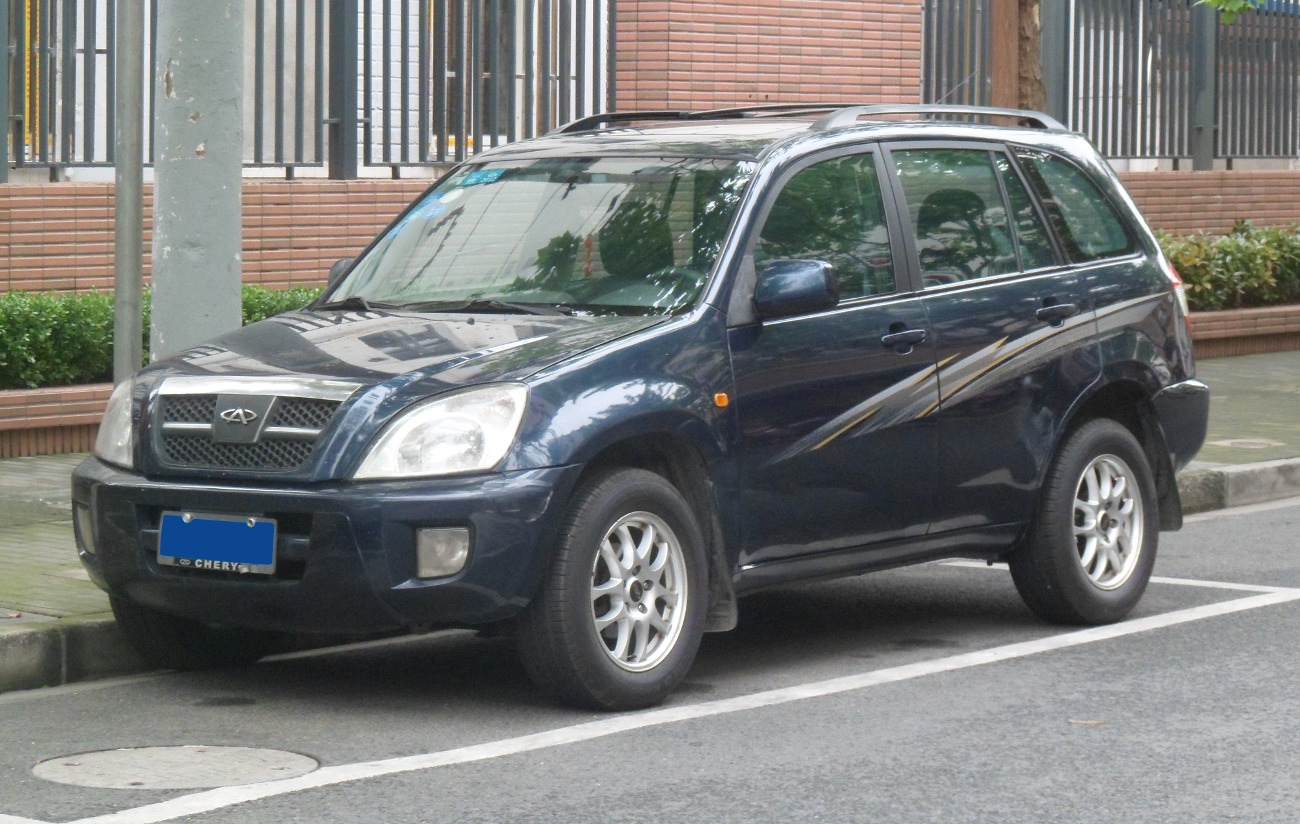
Original Chery Tiggo before the name change

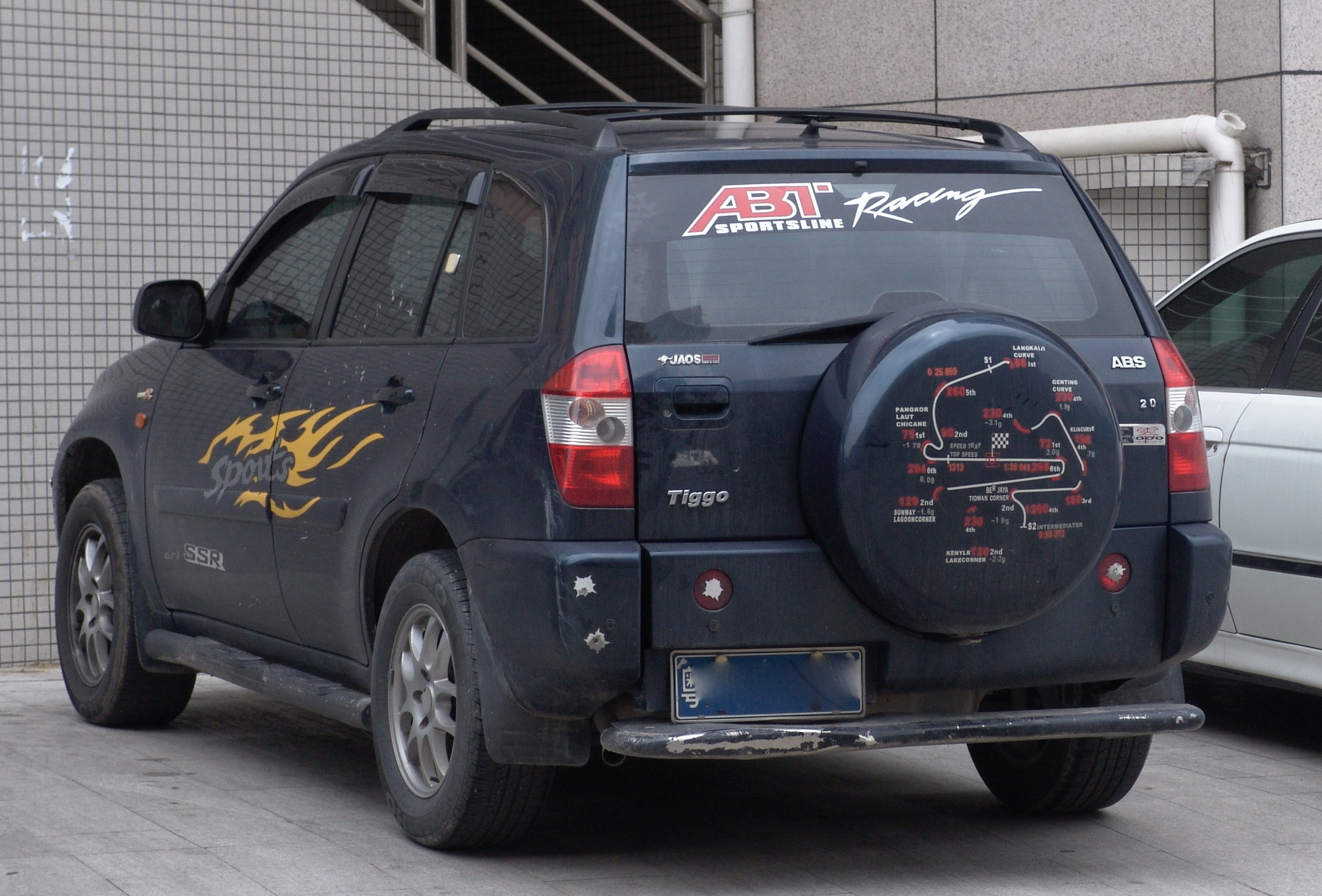
Rear of the original Chery Tiggo before the name change

=== 2010 facelift ===
In September 2010, Chery released the new 2011 Tiggo in China, essentially a facelift, built on the same platform. To the previous three engine options (1.6/1.8/2.0/L) is added the "1.6 s," a 1.6-liter with mechanical supercharger putting out 110 kW (150 PS; 148 hp) at 5500 rpm and 205 N⋅m (151 lb⋅ft) between 3,500 and 4,500 rpm. The 2010 facelift features a revised front end design and tail lamps.

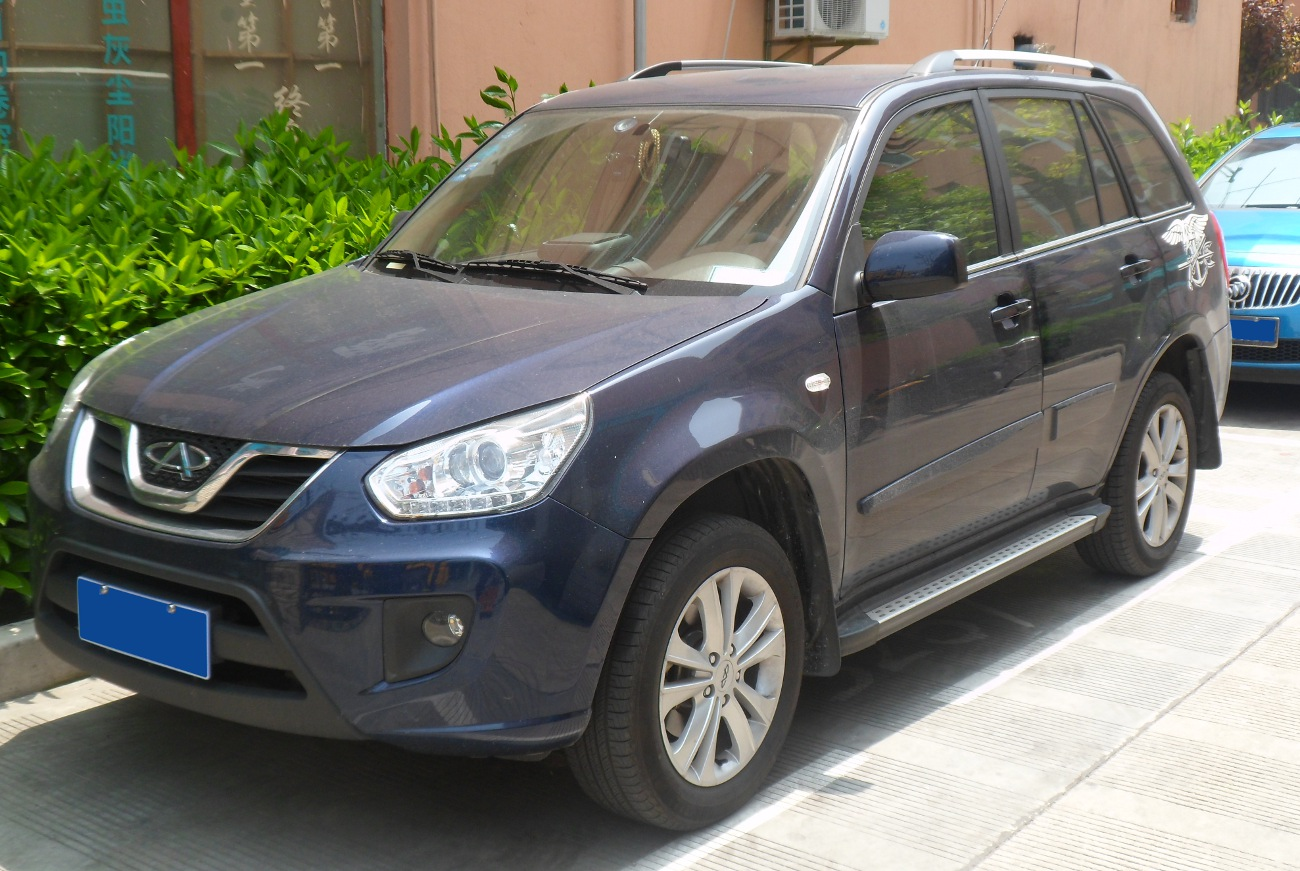
Front of the Chery Tiggo facelift before the name change

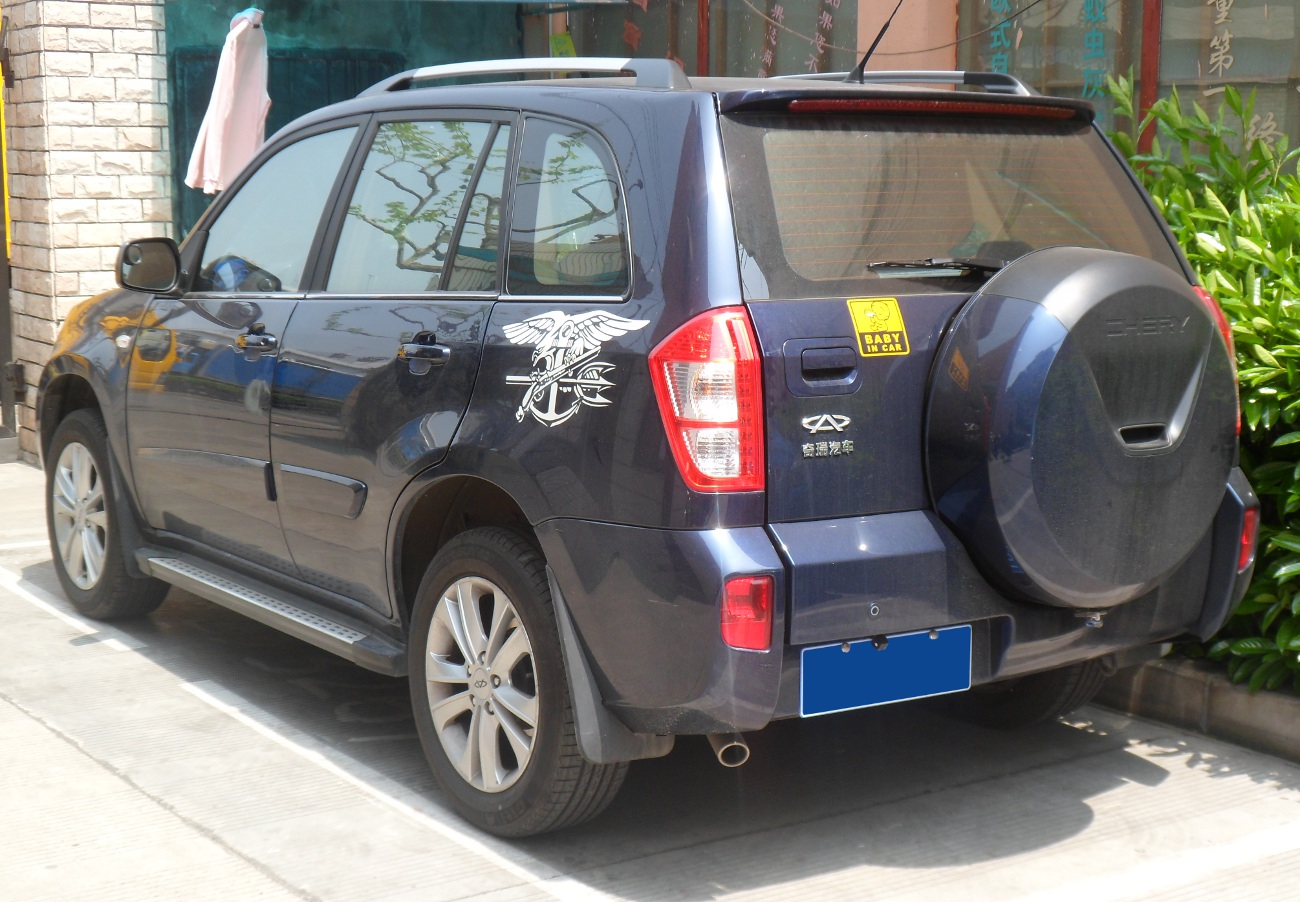
Rear of the Chery Tiggo facelift before the name change

=== 2014 model rename to Chery Tiggo 3 ===
During the Beijing Auto Show in 2014, another facelift was launched for the model and it was renamed to the Chery Tiggo 3, slotting the crossover as the entry model of the following Chery Tiggo crossover series. The market debut was May 2014, and the power train is a 1.6 liter engine producing 126 hp and 160N·m. The transmission is a 5-speed manual transmission or a CVT.

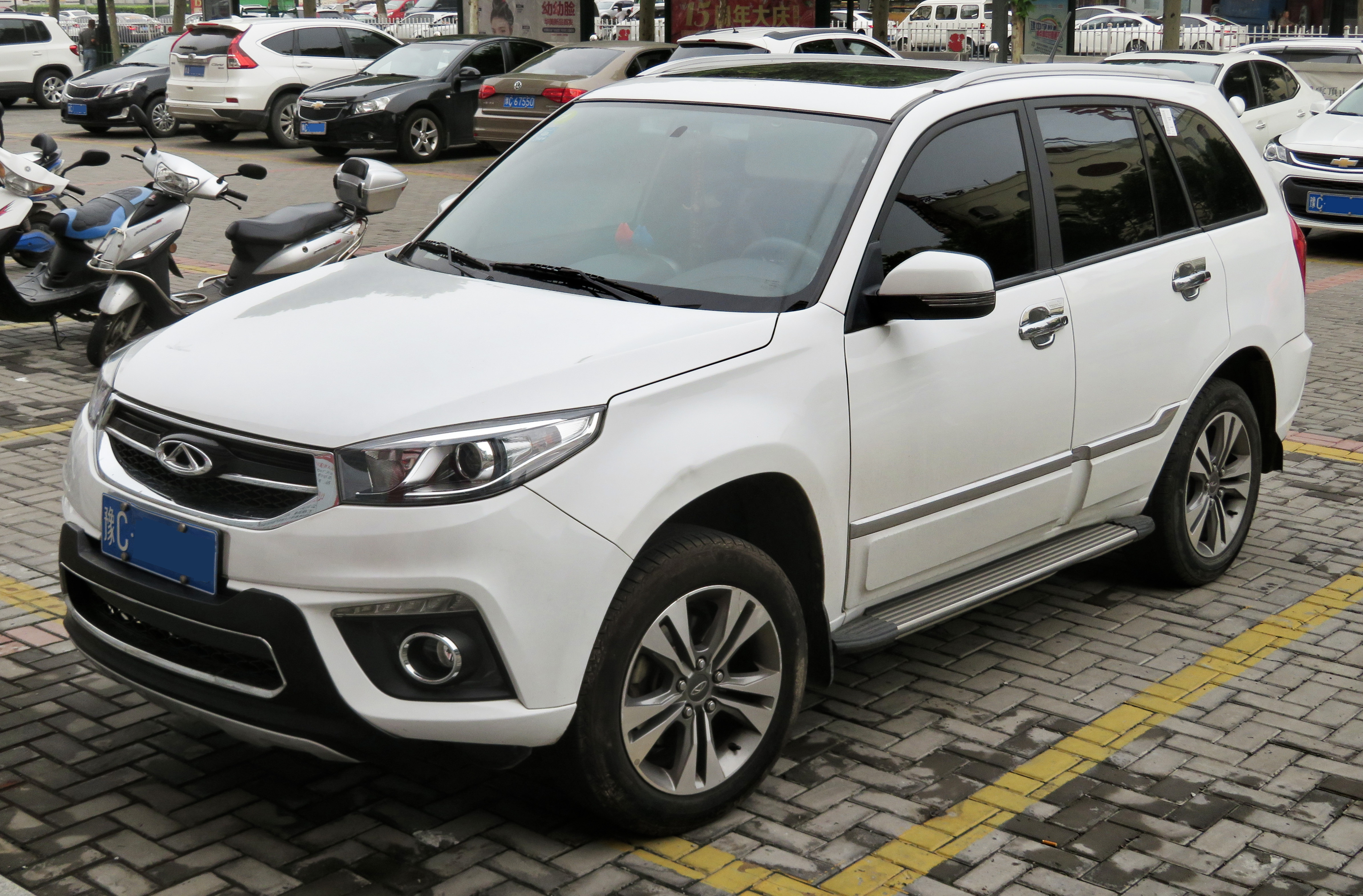
Chery Tiggo 3 front

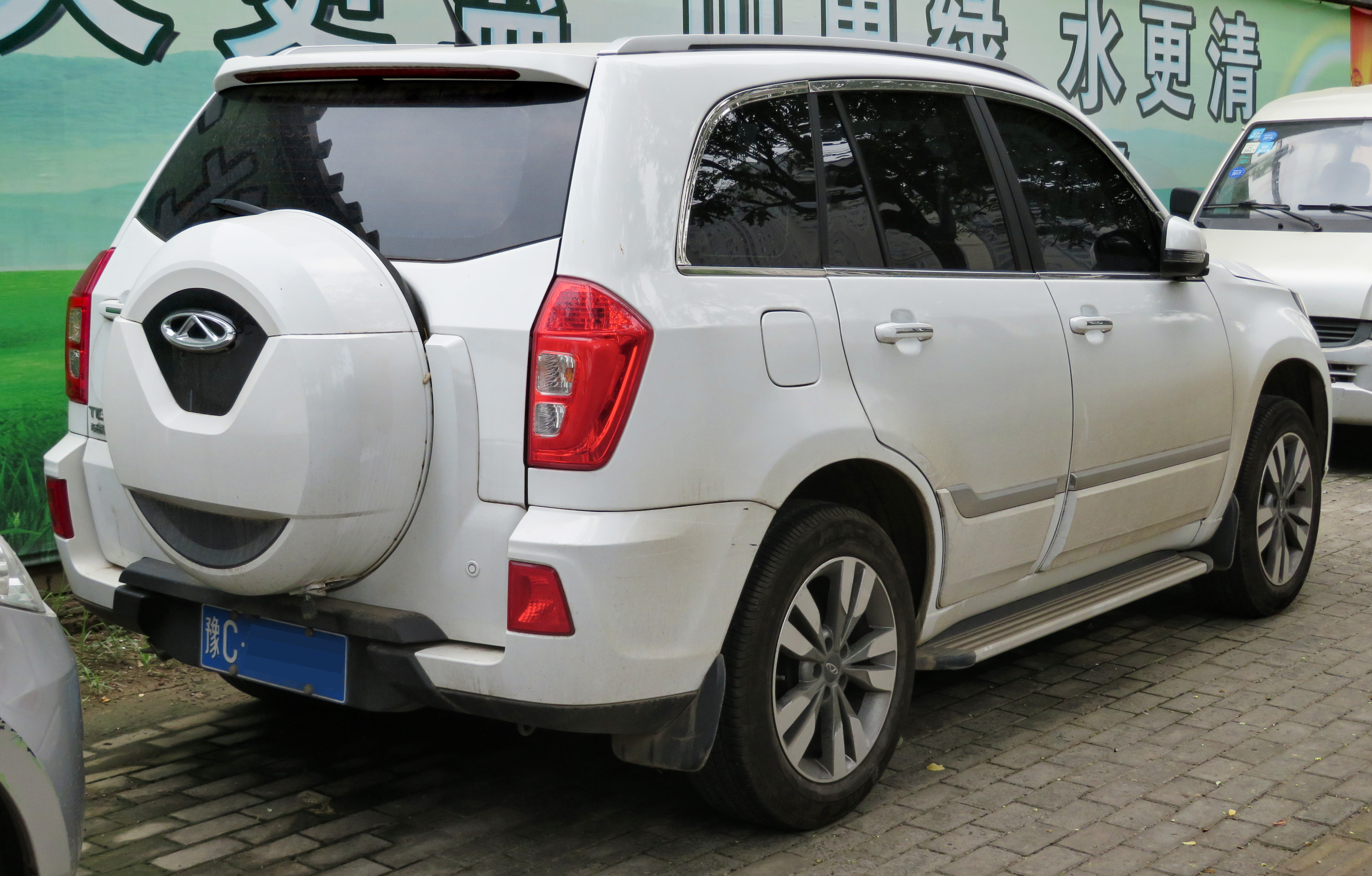
Chery Tiggo 3 rear

=== 2020 facelift ===
The Chery Tiggo 3 received another facelift in 2019 for the 2020 model year. The model was dubbed the "millionth edition" and features golden trim on the interior. The powertrains are a 1.5 liter engine producing 116 hp and 143N·m, and the transmission is a 5-speed manual transmission or a 2.0 liter engine producing 139PS and a maximum torque of 183N.m with a 5-speed automatic transmission unlike the previous version which had a 7-speed CVT transmission. In some markets it came with a 1.5 liter turbocharged engine producing 147 hp and 210N.m with a 9-speed CVT transmission.

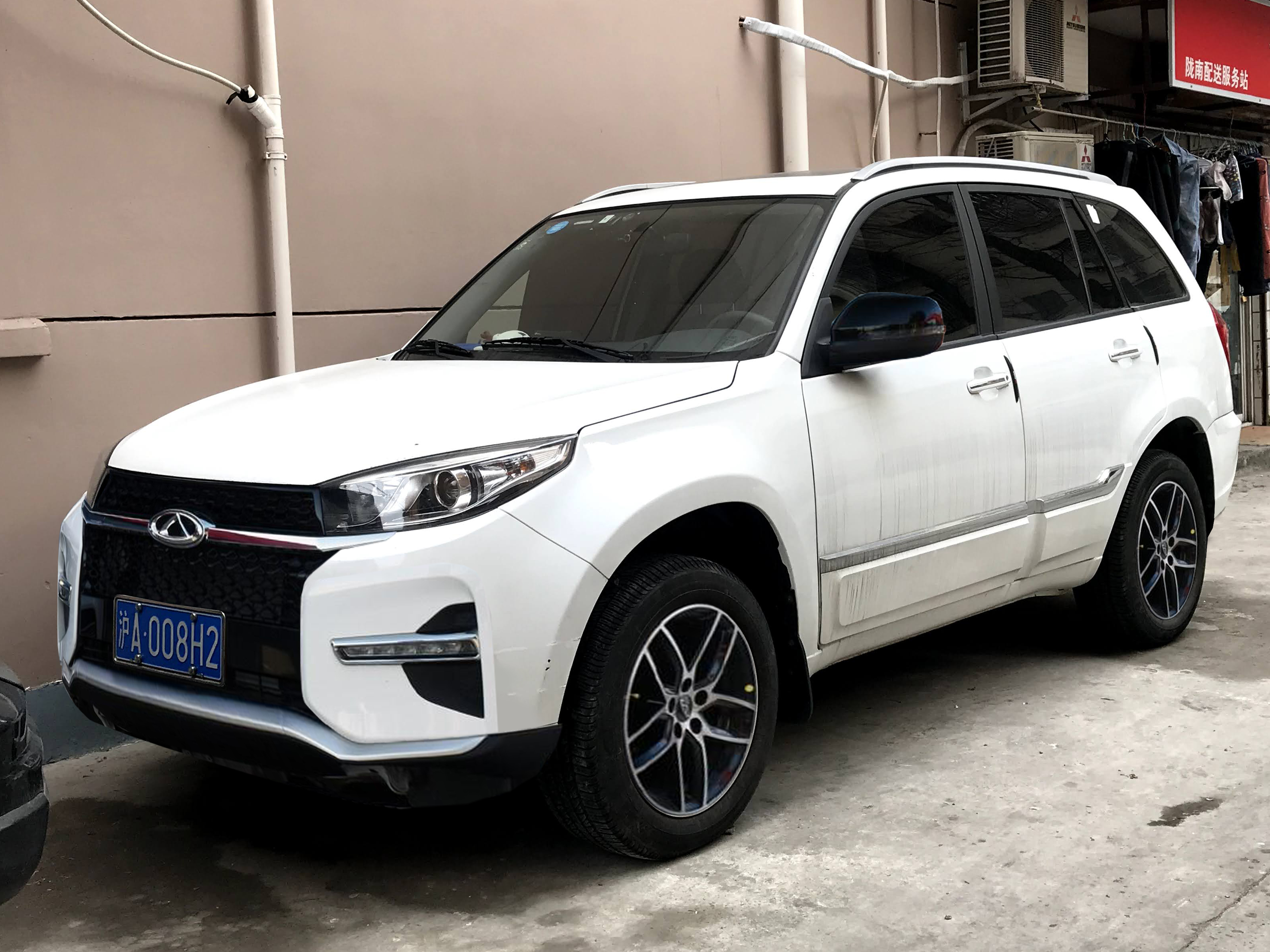
2020 Chery Tiggo 3 facelift

== International marketing ==
Outside of China, the Tiggo 3 has also been assembled in Uruguay from as of late 2007, as a result of a partnership between Chery and Argentine company SOCMA. The goal was to export the car to Argentina and Brazil – 30% to 50% share of local components are needed to receive zero-tariff status inside the Mercosur. As of May 2015, the plant was permanently closed.

The Tiggo 3 has also been assembled from knocked down kits in Italy by the DR Motor Company as the DR5.

The 2.0 L version is also being assembled in Egypt as of late 2008 under the Speranza brand name. It is the latest addition to the assembly line of Egyptian assembled Chery cars (Eastar, A5 and A1) by Aboul-Fotouh (a former BMW dealer in Egypt).

=== Malaysia ===
Launched Date	23 April 2007
Price	RM80,292
Engine Displacement, Horsepower and Torque	1,971cc DOHC engine, produces 129 horsepower at 5,750rpm and 180Nm of torque at 4,000rpm
Number of Seats	5
Airbag	dual SRS airbags
CD player	Yes

=== Italy ===
In Italy, it is assembled by the DR Motor Company and marketed as the DR5. It was introduced at the 2006 Bologna Motor Show and started the production in 2007, at the factory in Macchia d'Isernia.

It is available with three petrol engine options: a 1.6-litre, a 1.8-litre and a 2.0-litre, introduced in 2009.

The 1.6-litre petrol engine version (1,597 cc) has a maximum power output of 87 kW (118 PS; 117 bhp) at 6,100 rpm, a maximum torque of 145 N⋅m (107 lb⋅ft) at 4,250 rpm and a top speed of 175 km/h (109 mph). The 1.8-litre version (1,845 cc) has a maximum power output of 97 kW (132 PS; 130 bhp) at 5,750 rpm, a maximum torque of 171 N⋅m (126 lb⋅ft) at 4,500 rpm and a top speed of 185 km/h (115 mph). The 2.0-litre version (1,971 cc) has a maximum power output of 102 kW (139 PS; 137 bhp) at 6,000 rpm, a maximum torque of 183 N⋅m (135 lb⋅ft) at 4,250 rpm and a top speed of 190 km/h (120 mph).

In 2020, DR Automobiles launched EVO brand, and transferred the DR4, DR5 EVO (DR EVO) and DR6 to its new brand, renaming them EVO4, EVO5 and EVO6.

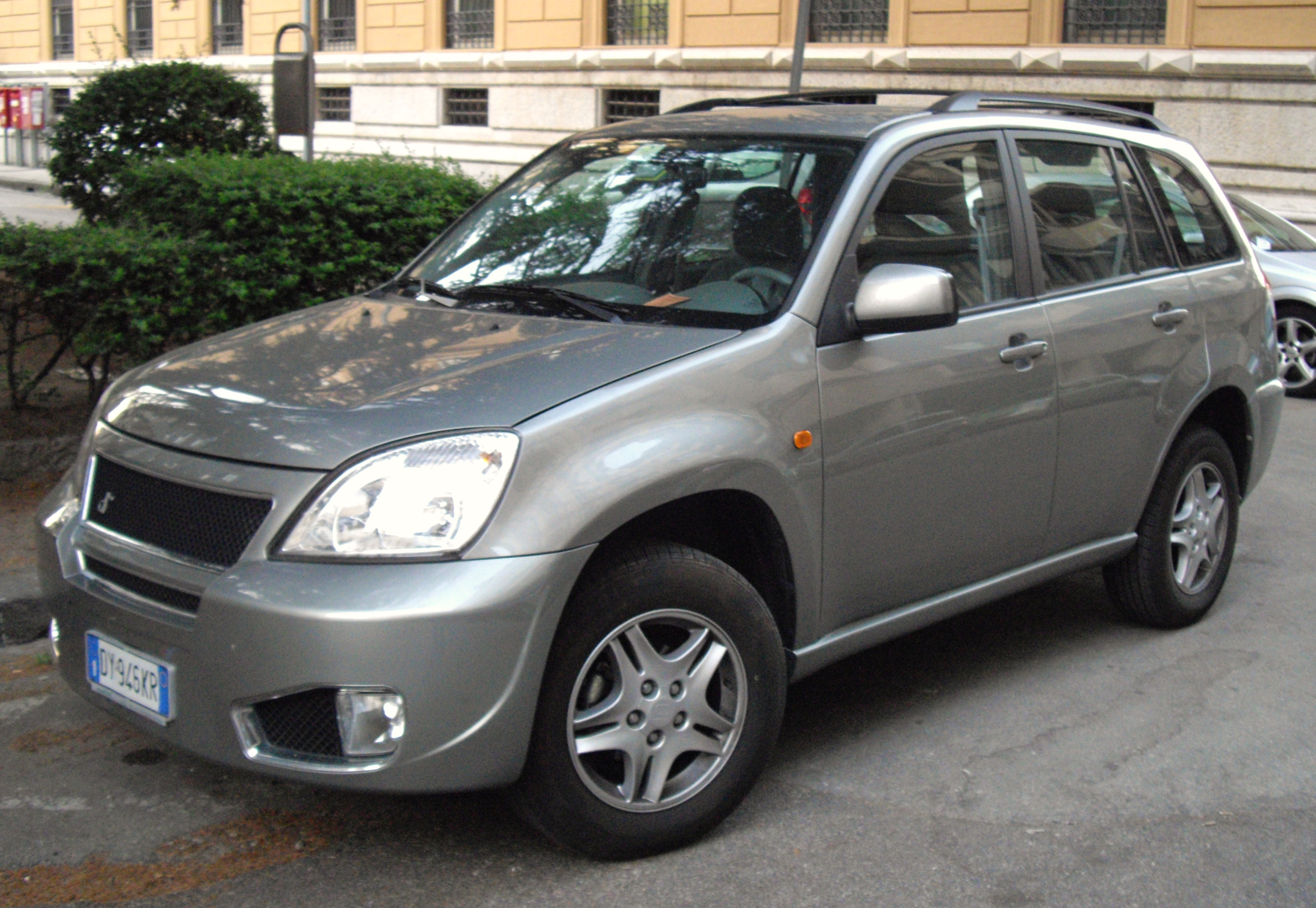
DR5 front, assembled in Italy

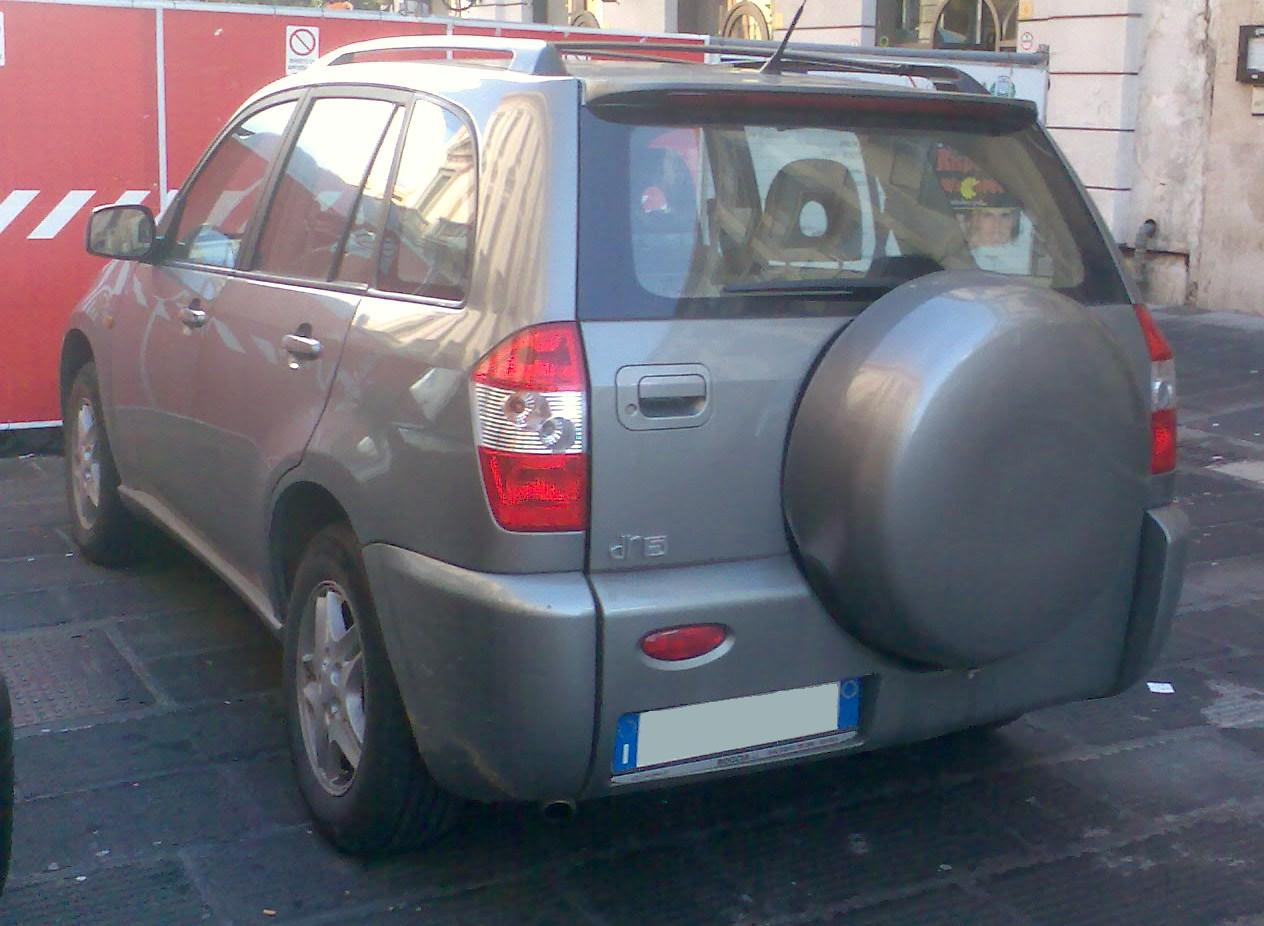
DR5 rear, assembled in Italy

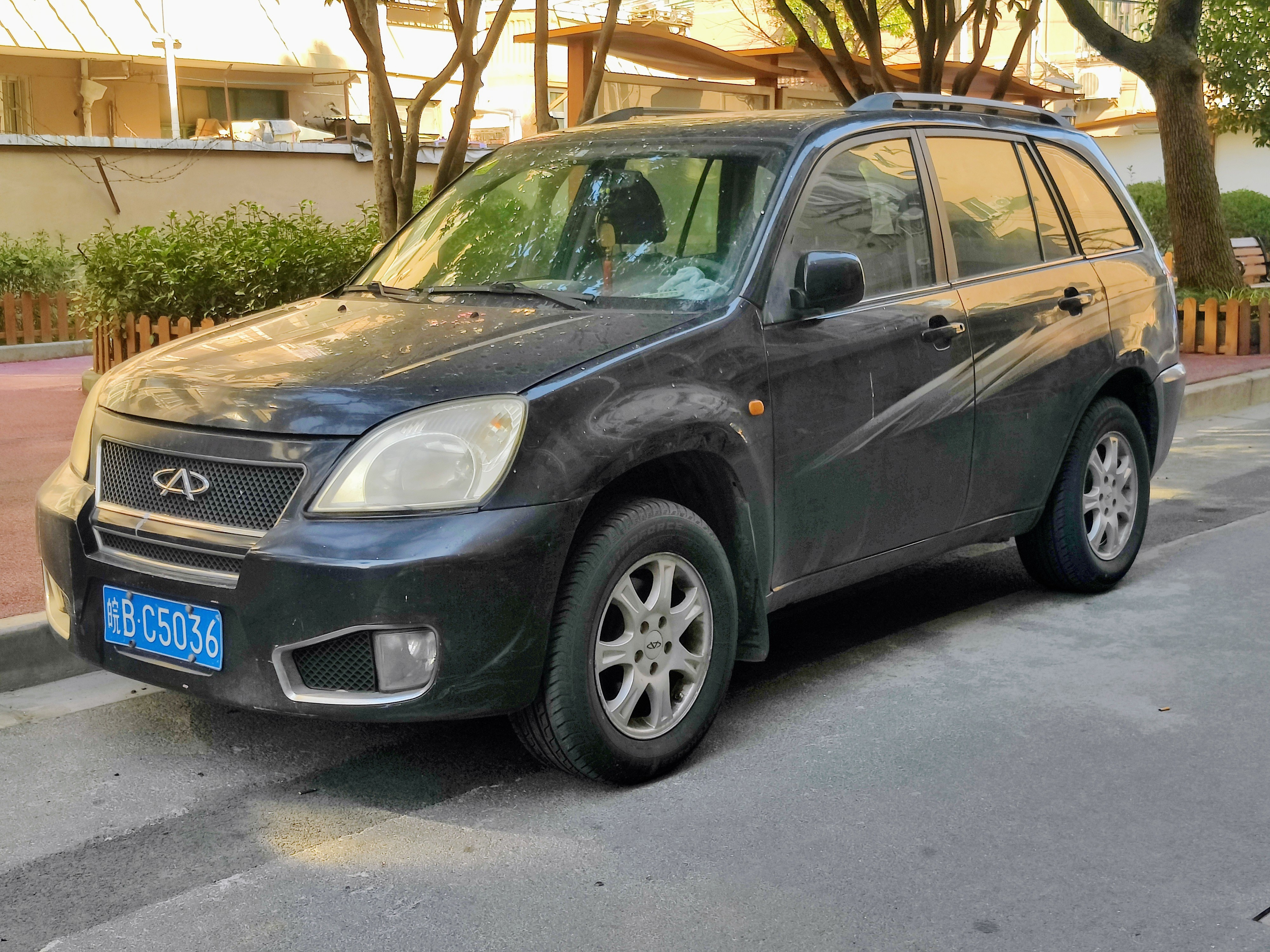
Chery Tiggo DR edition with the bumper from the Italian DR motor

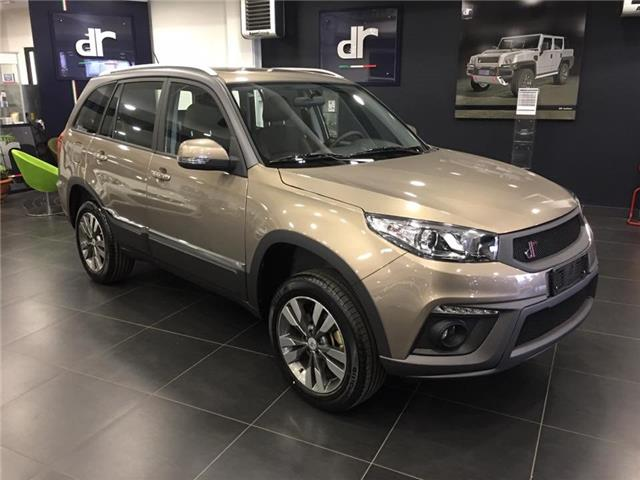
DR5

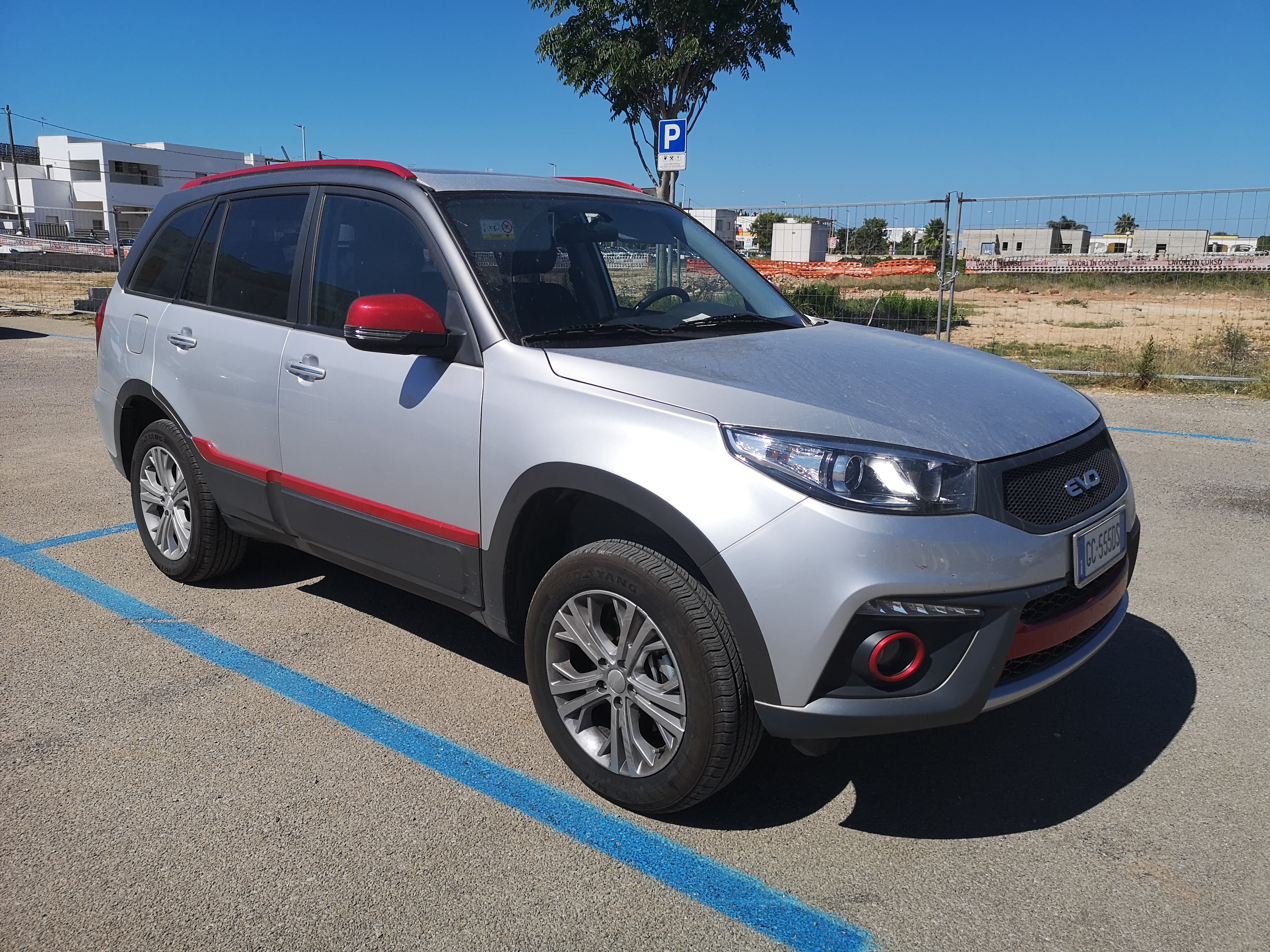
EVO5 front (2020-2023)

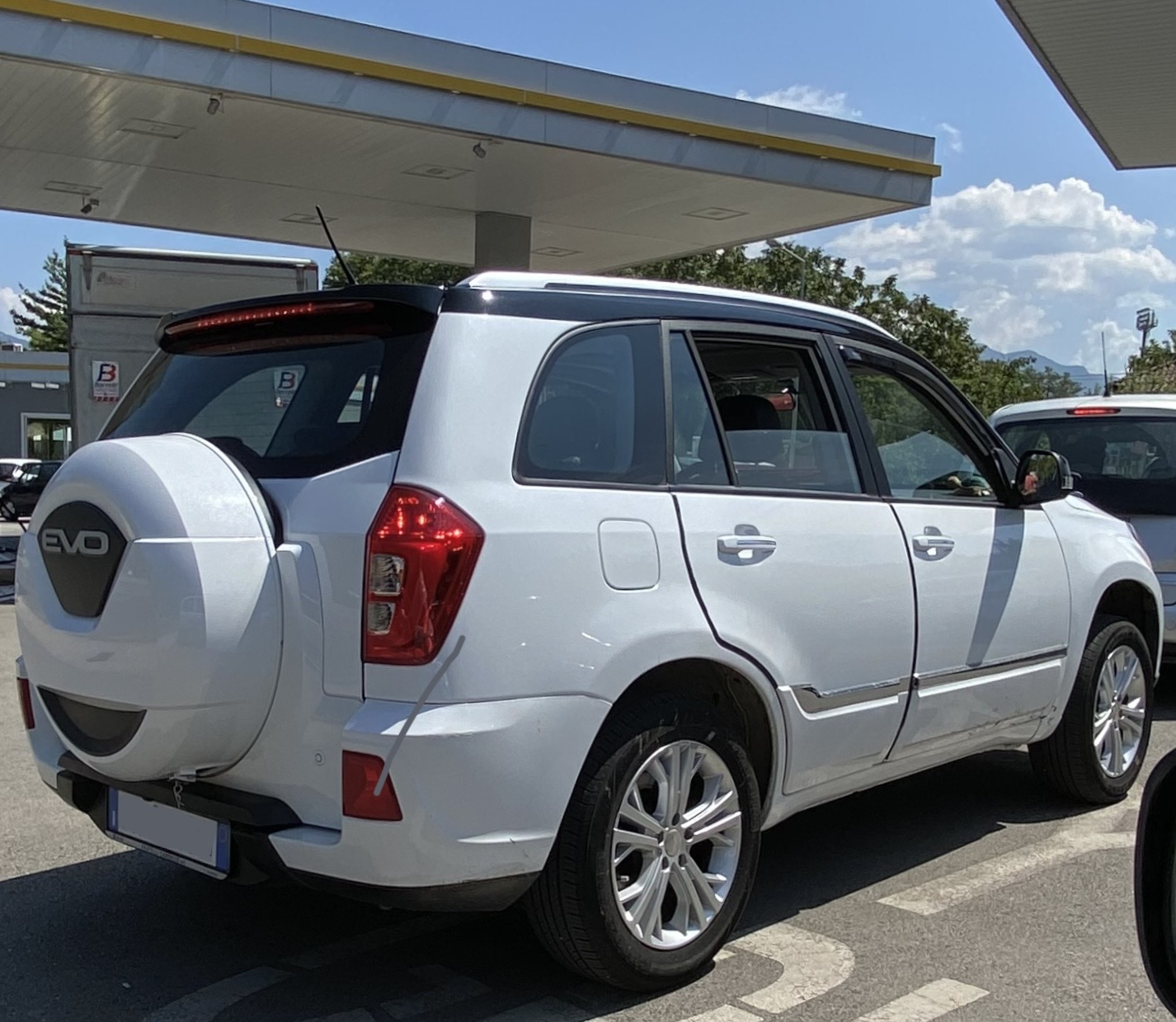
EVO5 rear (2020-2023)

== Safety ==
=== ANCAP ===
A 2011 Tiggo 3 was put to an offset crash-test by the ANCAP in October 2011 and scored a poor result of only two stars out of five. The rating comes as the side impact was not conducted, after Chery issued a recall to rectify some issues with side impact protection, and it was awarded the maximum score that it could achieve in the side impact test. However, even the maximum score in the side impact test would not have been enough to improve the car's safety rating beyond two stars.

ANCAP test results Chery J11 (2011)
Test	Score
Overall	2 /5 stars
Frontal offset	2/16
Side impact	16/16
Pole	Not Assessed
Seat belt reminders	0/3
Whiplash protection	Not Assessed
Pedestrian protection	Poor
Electronic stability control	Not Available

=== Latin NCAP ===
The Chinese-made Tiggo 3 in its most basic version for Latin American markets with 2 airbags and no ESC received 0 stars for adult occupants and 1 star for infants from Latin NCAP 2.0 in 2019.

Latin NCAP 2.0 test results Chery Tiggo 3 + 2 Airbags (2019, based on Euro NCAP 2008)
Test	Points	Stars
Adult occupant:	0.00/34.0	0 /5 stars
Child occupant:	10.21/49.00	1 /5 stars
