= Lowie Vermeersch =

Flemish automobile designer

- Born: 9 May 1974 (age 51); Kortrijk, Belgium
- Occupation: Automotive designer

Lowie Vermeersch (born 9 May 1974) is a Flemish designer and the founder and creative director of Granstudio, based in Turin, Italy. He is part of the third generation of a prominent artistic family.

He previously served as design director at Pininfarina. In 2010, Automobile Magazine ranked him 12th on its list of the "World's 25 Most Influential Car Designers".

Vermeersch is the chief executive officer and design director of Granstudio, a vehicle design consultancy headquartered in Turin.

Since 2022, he has also served as a professor and coordinator of the Master of Arts in Transdisciplinary Mobility Design at the Istituto Europeo di Design (IED).

== Background ==
Lowie Vermeersch was born on 9 May 1974 in Kortrijk, Belgium, into a prominent Flemish artistic family. His grandfather, José Vermeersch (1922–1997), was a sculptor associated with the post-war Flemish art movement. His father, Rik Vermeersch (born 1949), and his brothers, Pieter Vermeersch (born 1973), Robin Vermeersch (born 1977), and Tinus Vermeersch (born 1976), are all artists.

He studied industrial design engineering at Delft University of Technology.

In 1997, Vermeersch completed an internship at Pininfarina, during which he developed his graduation project. The project focused on the research and design of a concept car for 2012. He graduated in 1998 with a Master of Science in Industrial Design Engineering, receiving first-class honours. He was later awarded Best Graduate in Industrial Design Engineering for the 1997–1998 academic year.

In October 2010, the Belgian television channel Canvas broadcast a documentary focusing on his life and professional career.

== Career ==
=== Pininfarina ===
Following his graduation, Vermeersch joined Pininfarina, where he contributed to the design of numerous vehicles and prototypes, including the Metrocubo (interior) and Ford Start (interior). He was responsible for the concept design and styling of the Pininfarina Nido safety concept car, which was presented at the 2004 Paris Motor Show and later received the Compasso d'Oro design award.

In July 2005, he was promoted to chief designer of a Pininfarina design team. During this period, he worked on production vehicles for long-standing clients such as Ferrari and Peugeot, as well as projects for emerging markets, including the Chinese JAC B18 and the Brilliance Splendor SW.

As chief designer, he contributed to the design of the Ferrari California, unveiled at the 2008 Paris Motor Show, and oversaw the complete development of the Maserati Birdcage 75th, which was presented at the 2005 Geneva Motor Show. The Birdcage 75th received several awards, including the 2006 Louis Vuitton Classic Concept Car Award.

In 2005, Vermeersch also collaborated with the Istituto Europeo di Design (IED) in Turin. As coordinator of the institute's master's programme, he led the Fiat X1/99 concept car project, which was presented at the 2005 Geneva Motor Show.

In 2007, he was appointed design director, overseeing automotive design activities for clients including Ferrari, Fiat Group Automobiles, Maserati, Ford, Peugeot, Brilliance, Chery, and JAC.

As design director, he was responsible for the Pininfarina Sintesi concept car, the electric Bolloré B0, and the Alfa Romeo 2uettottanta, and supervised the design of the Ferrari FF and Ferrari 458.

=== Granstudio ===
In December 2010, Vermeersch resigned from his position at Pininfarina and founded Granstudio, enabling him to expand his work from automotive design into broader mobility design. The studio combines consultancy work for international clients with independent research projects.

Through Granstudio, he led the design of the Chery TX concept car. The production model derived from this concept, the Tiggo 7, received the award for Best Production Car Design China in 2016.

In collaboration with Paolo Garella, Granstudio designed the road and racing versions of the SCG003C and SCG003S for Scuderia Cameron Glickenhaus, led by Goran Popovic. The SCG003C was unveiled at the 2015 Geneva Motor Show and later competed in the 24 Hours of Nürburgring, achieving pole position in 2017, assisted by its aerodynamic design.

The studio has also designed production vehicles such as the BAIC Senova D50, Cowin X3, and Senova D70, as well as various concept studies.

The Senova OffSpace concept car, presented in 2016 as part of an ongoing collaboration with BAIC Motor, received critical attention and was awarded Best Concept Car China in 2016.

In November 2017, Vermeersch presented the Dallara Stradale in collaboration with Dallara, marking the company's first road-going car. The vehicle was designed with Giovanni Piccardo (exterior) and Rocco Carrieri (interior).

Vermeersch has stated that increasing diversity in vehicle types is expected to address differing mobility needs and contexts, an approach reflected in Granstudio's work.

In August 2019, the Granstudio-designed Drako GTE was launched at the Quail Motorsports Gathering during Monterey Car Week.

In 2020, Granstudio's team designed and developed DigiPHY, a mixed-reality platform for real-time vehicle testing and prototyping.

=== Biennale Interieur ===
From 2011 to 2017, Vermeersch served as president of the board of directors of the Interieur Foundation, a non-profit organisation active in the fields of design, product development, and innovation. The foundation organises the Biennale Interieur, which received the European Community Design Prize in 1994 and the Design Management Europe Award in 2008.

Vermeersch acted as curator for the Interieur Biennale in 2012, and was later noted by Wallpaper for "setting a new standard for the design fair experience".

== Designs ==
Selected projects developed under Vermeersch's direction include:

- Alfa Romeo 2uettottanta (Best Concept Car of the Year, 2010)
- Chery Tiggo 7
- Chery TX (Best Concept Car of the Year, 2012)
- Cowin i-CX
- Cowin X3
- Cowin Xuandu
- Drako Motors Drako GTE
- Drako Motors Drako Dragon
- Eurostar high-speed train
- Ferrari 458 Italia (Best of Show, Frankfurt Motor Show 2009; multiple awards)
- Ferrari FF
- Kaiyi E5
- Kaiyi X3
- Kaiyi X7
- Lightyear One
- Maserati GranCabrio
- Maserati Birdcage 75th (Louis Vuitton Classic Concept Car Award)
- Pininfarina B0
- Pininfarina Nido (Most Beautiful Car in the World; ADI Compasso d'Oro)
- Pininfarina Sintesi (Red Dot Award)
- Prinoth Beast (snow groomer)
- Scuderia Cameron Glickenhaus SCG003
- Tata Pr1ma
