= Kaiyi Kunlun =

Compact crossover SUV

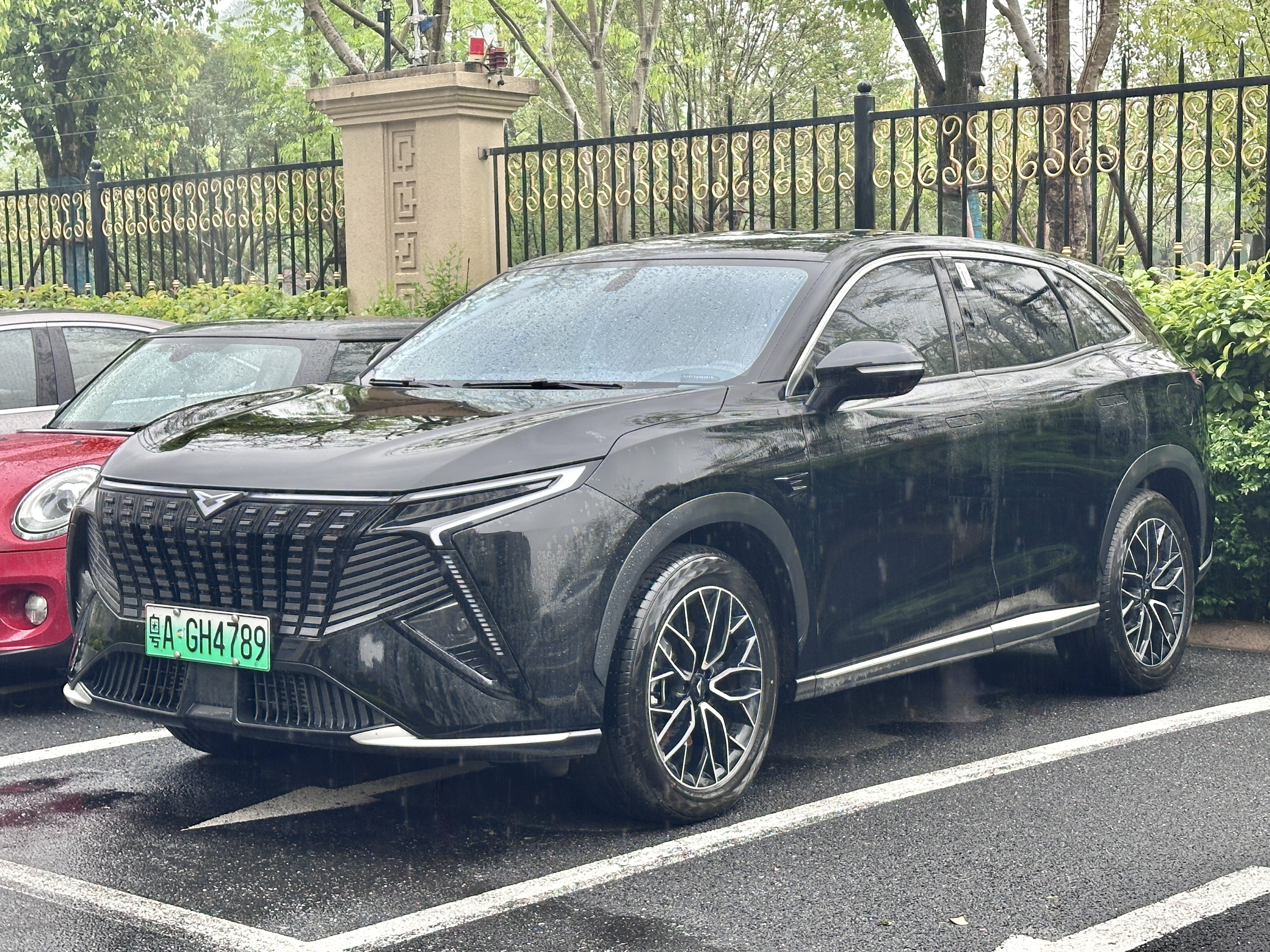

Overview
- Manufacturer: Kaiyi Auto
- Also called: Kaiyi X7; GTV Kain (Cambodia); EVO 8 (Italy); Sportequipe 8 GT (Italy); Lamari Hircani (Iran)
- Production: 2022–present
- Assembly: China: Wuhu, Anhui; Yibin, Sichuan
- Designer: Lowie Vermeersch of Granstudio

Body and chassis
- Class: Compact crossover SUV (D)
- Body style: 5-door SUV
- Layout: Front-engine, front-wheel-drive; Front-engine, four wheel drive
- Platform: i-FA platform

Powertrain
- Engine: Petrol: 1.6 L I4 turbo; 2.0 L I4 turbo; Petrol PHEV: 1.5 L I4 turbo
- Power output: 197–254 hp (147–189 kW; 200–258 PS); 204–367 hp (152–274 kW; 207–372 PS) (PHEV)
- Transmission: 7-speed DCT
- Electric range: 120–180 km (75–112 mi) (PHEV)

Dimensions
- Wheelbase: 2,820 mm (111.0 in)
- Length: 4,738 mm (186.5 in)
- Width: 1,968 mm (77.5 in)
- Height: 1,708 mm (67.2 in)

The Kaiyi Kunlun (Chinese: 昆仑) is a compact crossover SUV produced by Kaiyi Auto since 2023.

== Overview ==
Rear view

The Kunlun was launched in February 2023 offering 5-seat and 7-seat (2+3+2) layouts. The interior of the Kunlun features a full LCD instrument panel and a floating 12.8-inch central control screen with Huawei media system. Basic driving assistance features include keyless entry, lane departure warning, autonomous parking, hill start assistance, and hill descent control. The higher trim level offers a level 2 driving assistance system.

== Powertrain ==
The petrol version of the Kunlun is available with a 1.6-litre turbo engine or a 2.0-litre turbo engine, both engine options are mated to a seven-speed DCT. The 1.6-litre turbo engine has a maximum power of 147 kW (197 hp; 200 PS) and a peak torque of 290 N⋅m (29.6 kg⋅m; 214 lb⋅ft). The 2.0-litre turbo engine has a maximum power of 187 kW (251 hp; 254 PS) and a peak torque of 390 N⋅m (39.8 kg⋅m; 288 lb⋅ft) with the fuel consumption of 8.3 L/100 km (12.0 km/L; 34.0 mpg_{‑imp}; 28.3 mpg_{‑US}). The PHEV version of the Kunlun is equipped with a 1.5-litre turbo engine and electric motors, with single-motor and dual-motor options available. The maximum power of the two variants are 150 kW (201 hp; 204 PS) and 270 kW (362 hp; 367 PS), supporting a pure electric cruising range of 120 and 180 kilometres (75 and 112 mi) respectively.
