= Kaiyi Shiyue =

Battery electric city car

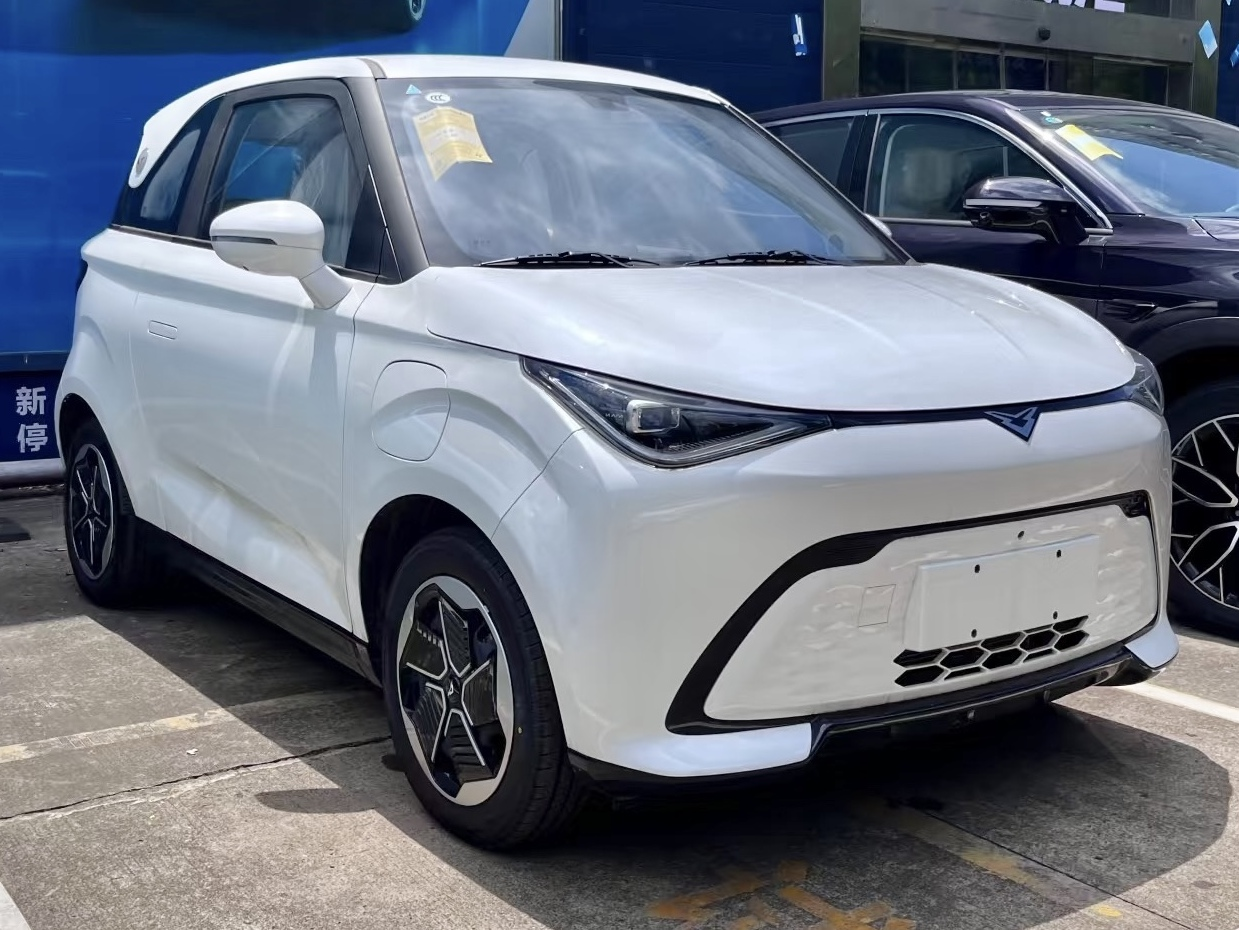

Overview
- Manufacturer: Kaiyi Auto
- Also called: Kaiyi e-Qute 02/04; Chery Duomi (China, 2025–present); Jetour X20e (2025–present)
- Production: 2023–present
- Assembly: China: Wuhu, Anhui; Yibin, Sichuan

Body and chassis
- Class: City car (A)
- Body style: 3-door hatchback; 5-door hatchback (Mate/Max)
- Layout: Front-wheel drive

Dimensions
- Wheelbase: 2,160 mm (85.0 in) (3-door); 2,500 mm (98.4 in) (5-door); 2,520 mm (99.2 in) (Chery Duomi)
- Length: 3,360 mm (132.3 in) (3-door); 3,695 mm (145.5 in) (5-door); 3,720 mm (146.5 in) (Chery Duomi)
- Width: 1,685 mm (66.3 in); 1,700 mm (66.9 in) (Chery Duomi)
- Height: 1,615 mm (63.6 in); 1,599 mm (63.0 in) (Chery Duomi)
- Curb weight: 950–1,040 kg (2,094–2,293 lb)

The Kaiyi Shiyue (Chinese: 拾月) is a battery electric city car produced by Kaiyi Auto.

== Overview ==
In January 2023, the Kaiyi Auto announced a thorough modernization and expansion of model range, presenting a prototype of a new small model called as the Kaiyi i-EA 01. In October of the same year, a production variant was presented under the name Kaiyi Shiyue. The car took the form of a small, urban 3-door hatchback with a four-person passenger cabin and a sharp silhouette diversified by numerous arches. Both the front fascia and the rear part of the body were decorated with tear-shaped lighting shades.

The simple, sparsely designed passenger cabin is covered with two-tone materials. The steering wheel has a two-spoke form, while in the central point of the dashboard there is a touch screen of the multimedia system.

== Kaiyi Shiyue Mate/Max and Chery Duomi ==
The 5-door variant was launched in April 2024, and is called the Kaiyi Shiyue Mate. While featuring the same front and rear end styling, the Shiyue Mate adds 360mm to the wheelbase and full car length compared to the regular 3-door Shiyue. News of a rebadged variant of the Shiyue Mate surfaced in March 2025, with the Shiyue Mate now also being also sold as the Chery Duomi under the QQ city car series of the Chery brand. The Shiyue Mate was renamed to Shiyue Max in April 2026.

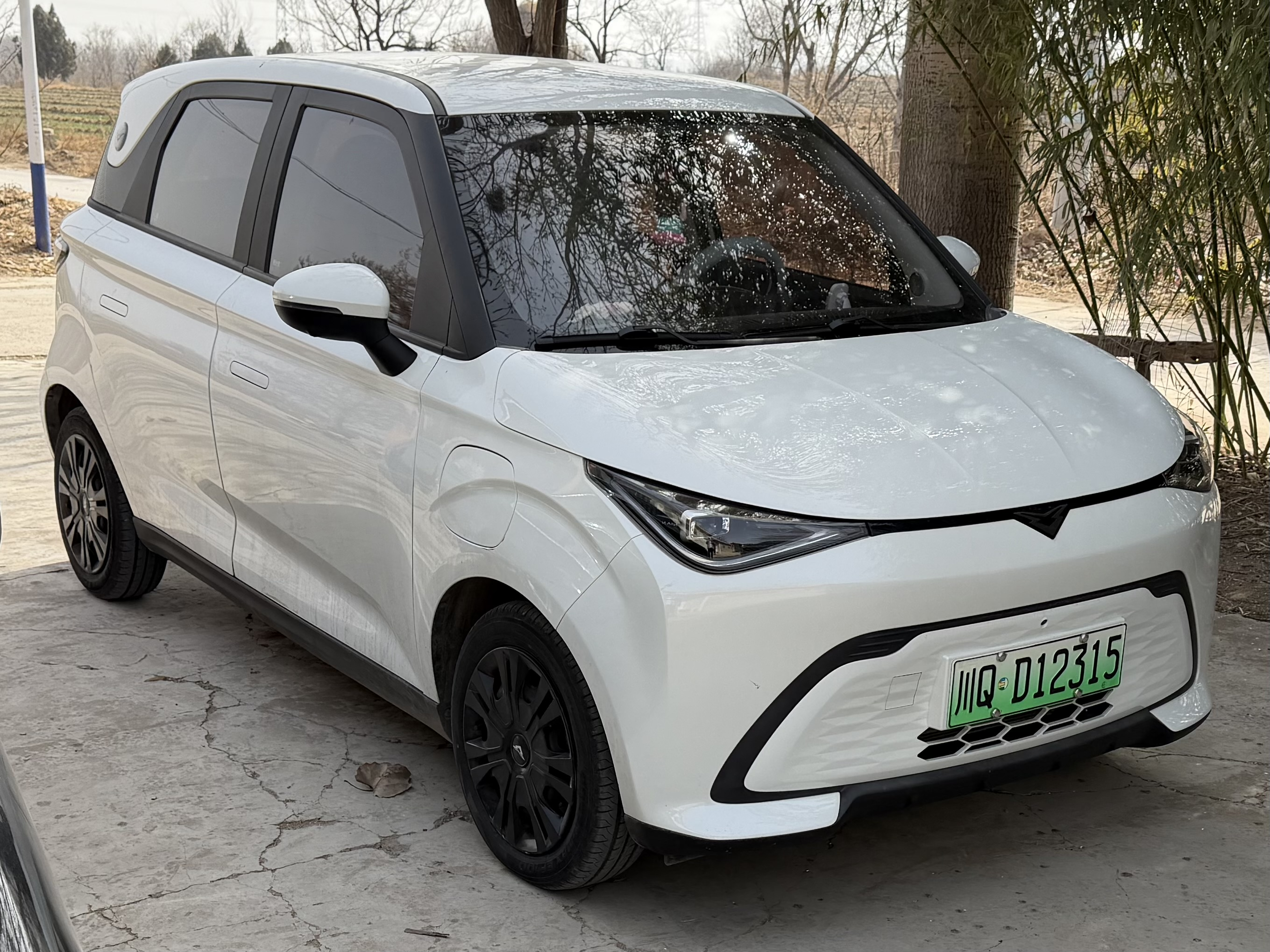
Kaiyi Shiyue Mate

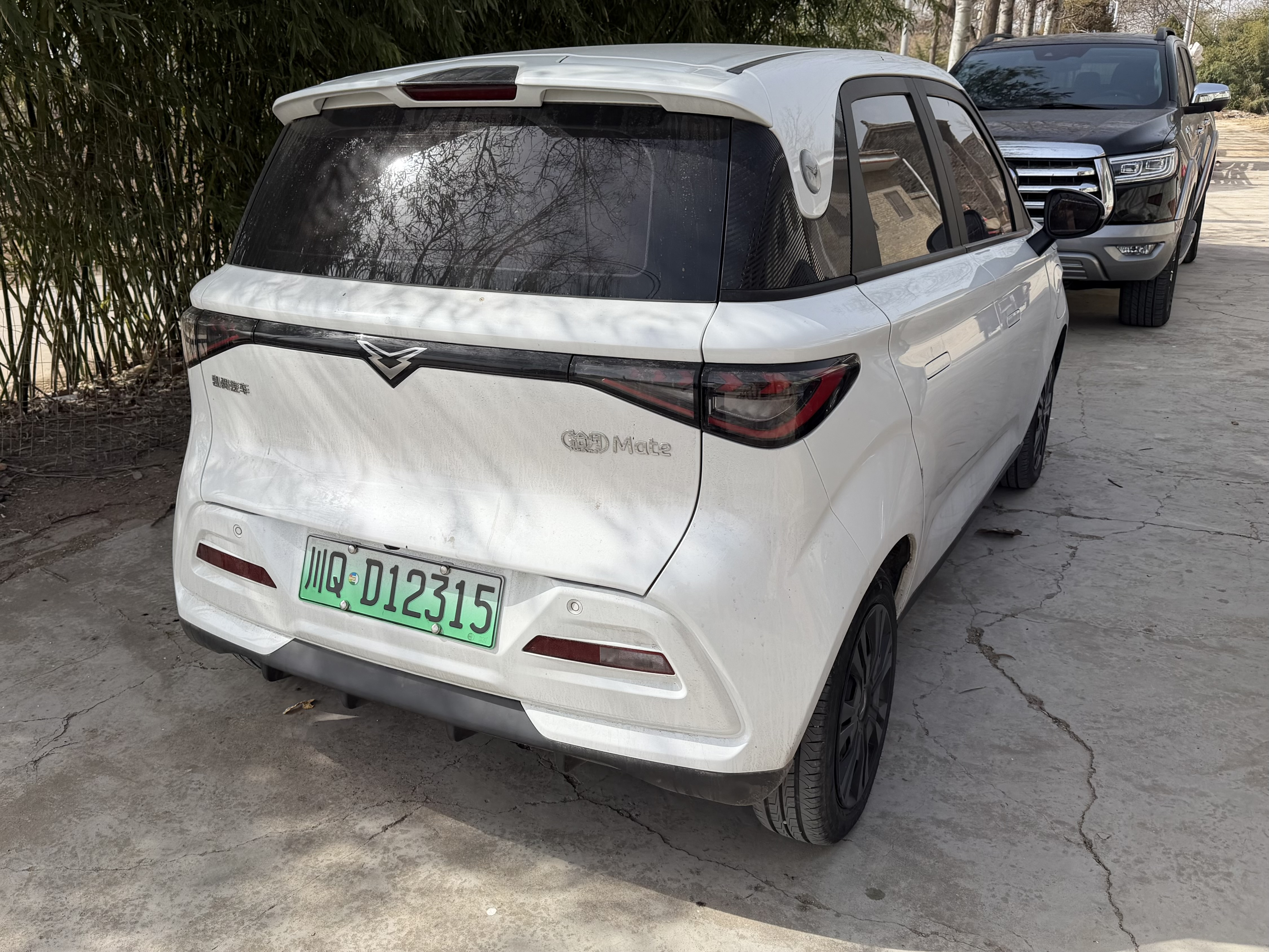
Rear view

Kaiyi Shiyue Max

Rear view

== Powertrain ==
The Shiyue is a fully electric car powered by two electric motors with a power of 47 HP or 54 HP. The range on one charge is, depending on the battery pack, 155, 210 or 301 kilometers, respectively.

== Sales ==
Year	China	
Year	Shiyue	Duomi
2023	628	—
2024	8,861	—
2025	6,057	4,696
