= Kaiyi Xuandu =

Compact sedan

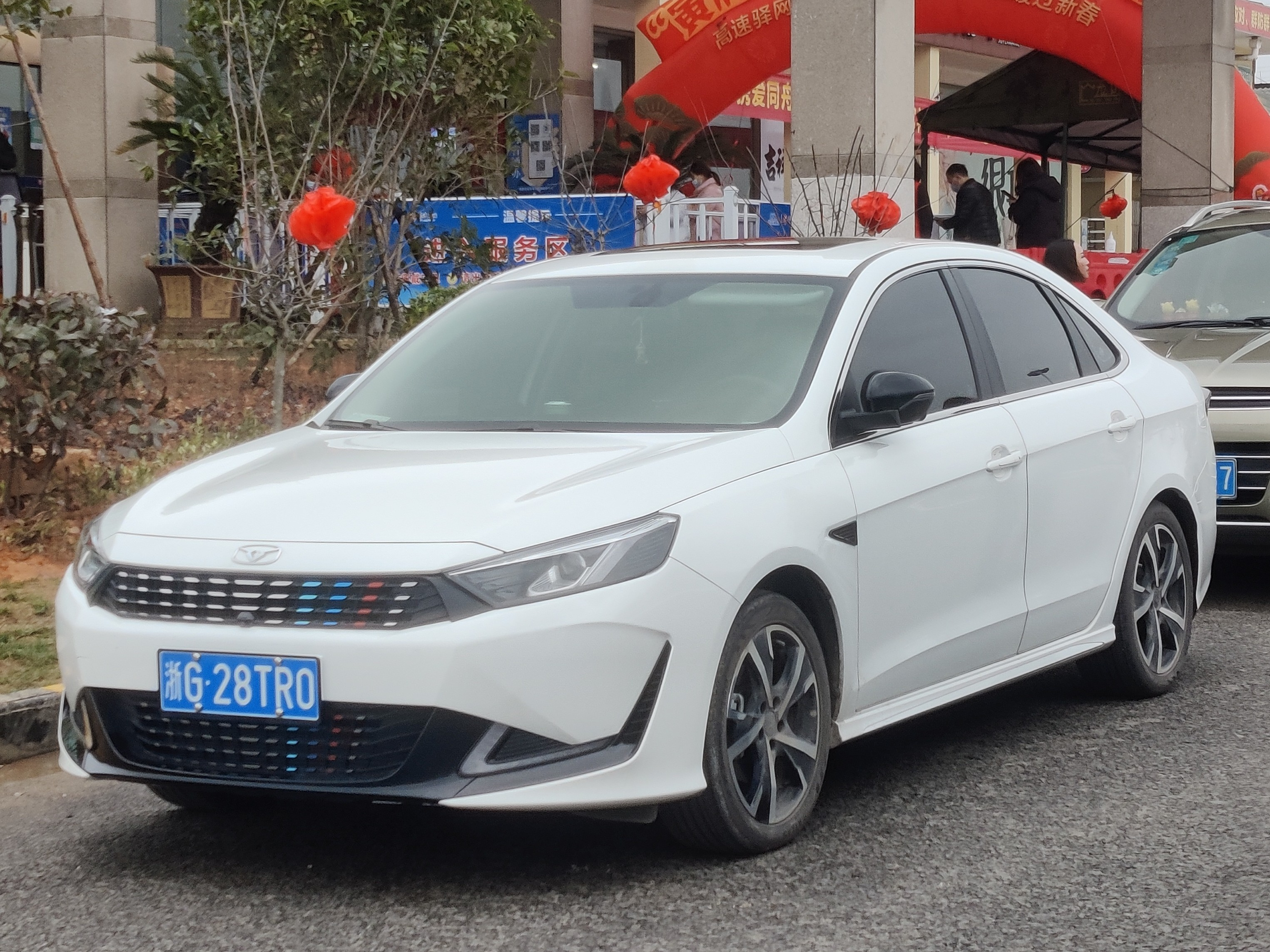

Overview
- Manufacturer: Kaiyi Auto
- Also called: Kaiyi E5 (export); Bahman Respect (Iran)
- Production: 2021–present
- Assembly: China: Wuhu, Anhui; Iran: Tehran (Bahman Group); Russia: Kaliningrad (Avtotor)
- Designer: Lowie Vermeersch at Granstudio

Body and chassis
- Class: Compact car (C)
- Body style: 4-door sedan
- Layout: Front-engine, front-wheel-drive
- Related: Chery Arrizo 7

Powertrain
- Engine: Petrol: 1.5 L I4 turbo
- Electric motor: One 160 kW (215 hp; 218 PS)
- Power output: 115 kW (154 hp; 156 PS)
- Transmission: 5-speed manual; 9-speed CVT
- Battery: 50.51 kWh LFP; 53.6 kWh LFP; 60.2 kWh LFP
- Electric range: 420 km (260 mi); 451 km (280 mi); 501 km (311 mi)

Dimensions
- Wheelbase: 2,700 mm (106.3 in)
- Length: 4,666 mm (183.7 in)
- Width: 1,825 mm (71.9 in)
- Height: 1,483 mm (58.4 in)
- Curb weight: 1,366–1,409 kg (3,012–3,106 lb)

Chronology
- Predecessor: Cowin E5

The Kaiyi Xuandu is a compact sedan produced by Kaiyi Auto since 2021.

== Overview ==
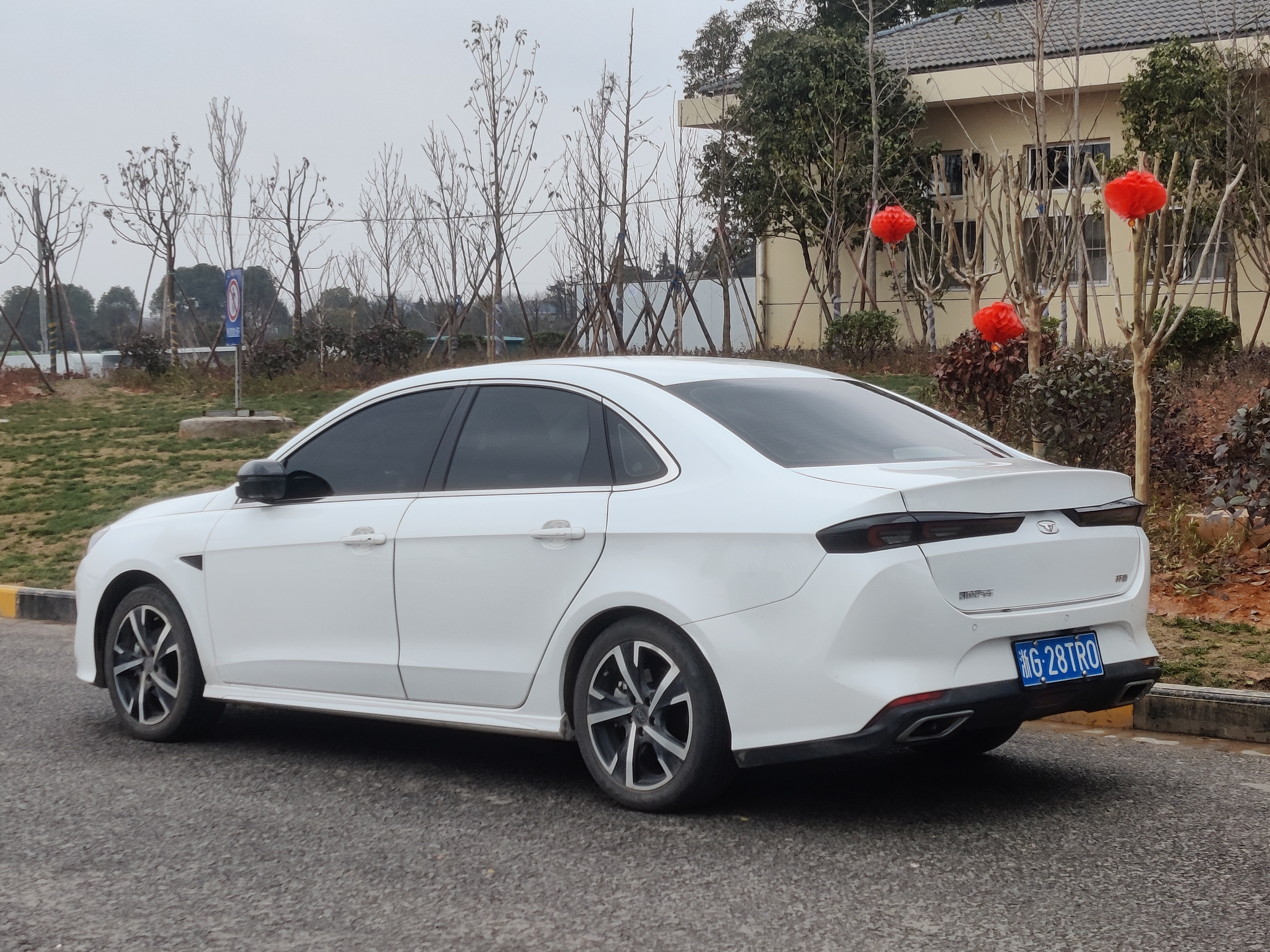
Rear view

At the end of July 2021, the Cowin lineup was expanded with a large compact sedan called Xuandu. To develop it, the parent company Chery used the construction of the Arrizo 7 produced from 2013 to 2018, which was extensively modified in terms of visuals.

The Xuandu has gently styled headlights, as well as a narrow air intake between them. The rear part of the body is decorated with a characteristic, luminous strip divided in the central point with the manufacturer's logo. The passenger compartment has a new design of the dashboard, with a central console facing the driver and a touch screen of the multimedia system.

Like other low-cost Cowin models, the Xuandu was developed for the mainland Chinese market in mind in order to compete with other compact cars. The sale is scheduled to start in the third quarter of 2021.

== Kaiyi Xuandu EV ==
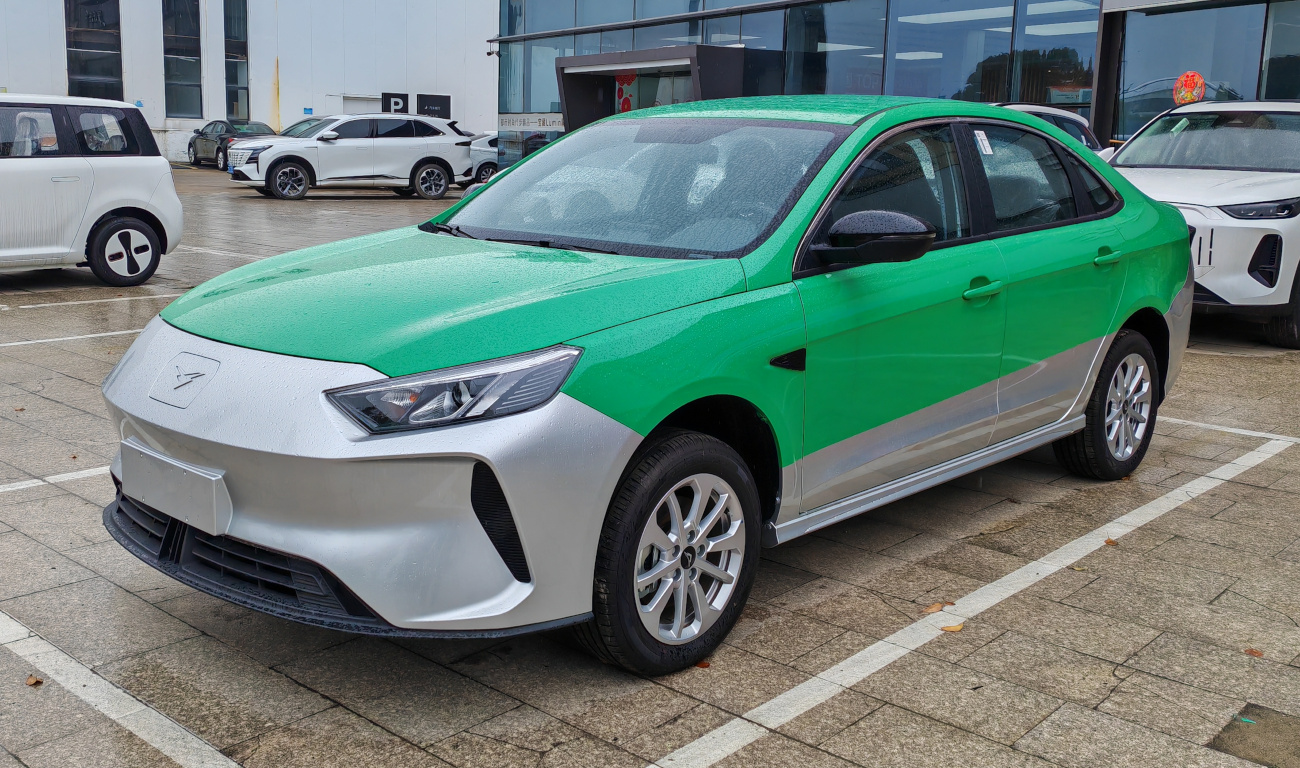
Kaiyi Xuandu EV

In 2024, the lineup expanded with the electric version of the Xuandu, featuring a redesigned, more pointed front fascia and a reshaped rear bumper, resulting in a body that's 73 mm longer than the combustion-powered version. It's powered by a 163-horsepower electric motor, and the battery allows for a range of up to 350 kilometers on a single charge.
