= Cowin C3 =

Chinese subcompact car

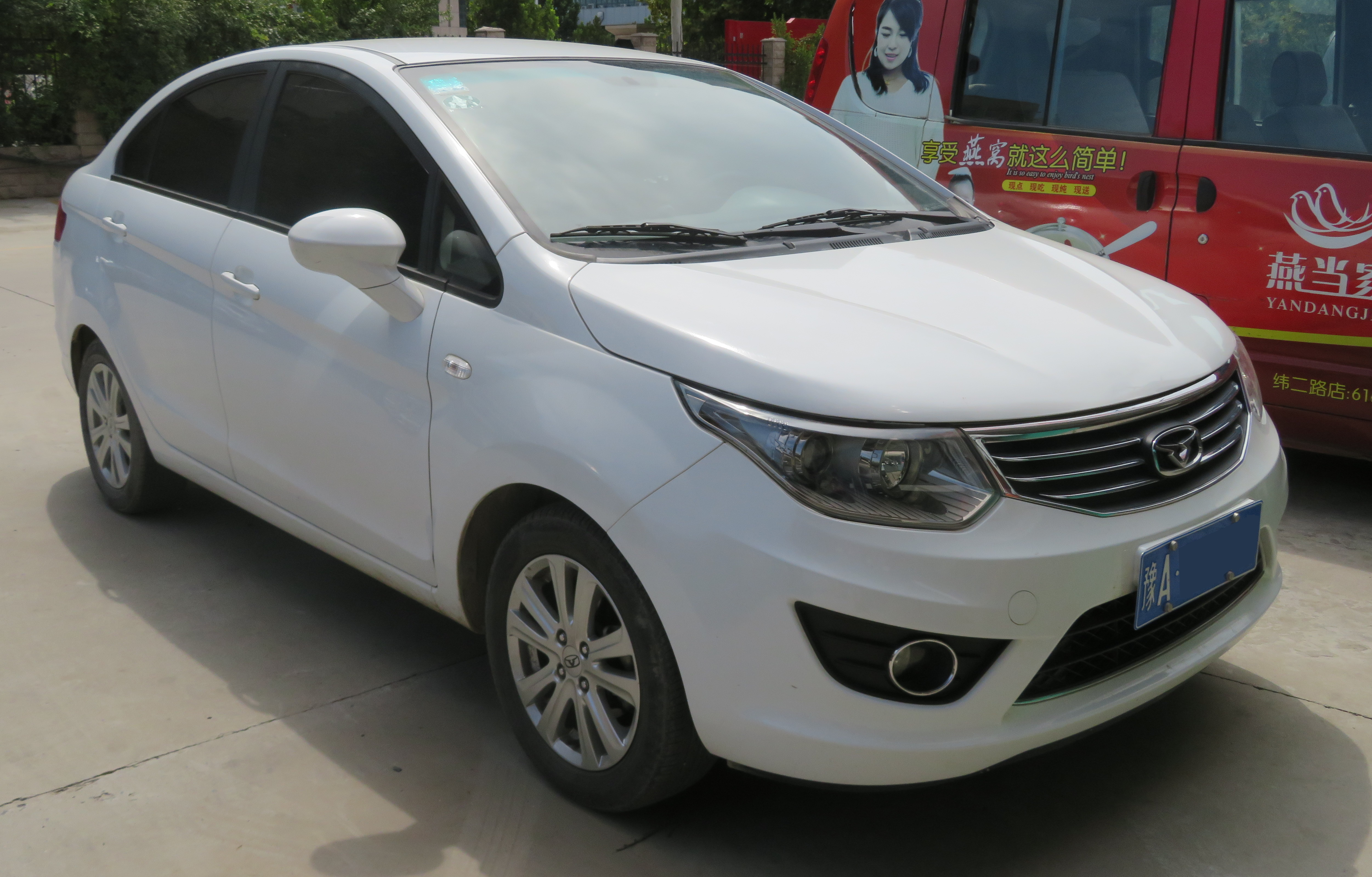

Overview
- Manufacturer: Cowin Auto
- Also called: Chery E1; Chery E2; Chery Cowin 2 Cowin C3R (hatchback); Chery eQ2 (EV)
- Production: 2014–2020 (sedan); 2015–2020 (hatchback)
- Assembly: China: Wuhu, Anhui
- Designer: Giuliano Biasio at Torino Design

Body and chassis
- Class: Subcompact (B)
- Body style: 4-door sedan 5-door hatchback
- Layout: FF layout

Powertrain
- Engine: 1.5 L SQR477F I4 (petrol)
- Electric motor: 57hp Permanent magnet synchronous electric motor (C3R EV & Chery eQ2)
- Transmission: 5-speed manual 4-speed automatic

Dimensions
- Wheelbase: 2,510 mm (98.8 in)
- Length: 4,250 mm (167.3 in) (sedan); 3,972 mm (156.4 in) (hatchback)
- Width: 1,726 mm (68.0 in)
- Height: 1,510 mm (59.4 in)
- Curb weight: 1,206–1,208 kg (2,659–2,663 lb)

The Cowin C3 sedan and Cowin C3R hatchback, was a subcompact car manufactured by the Chinese automaker Kaiyi Auto (subsidiary of Chery).

== Cowin C3 ==
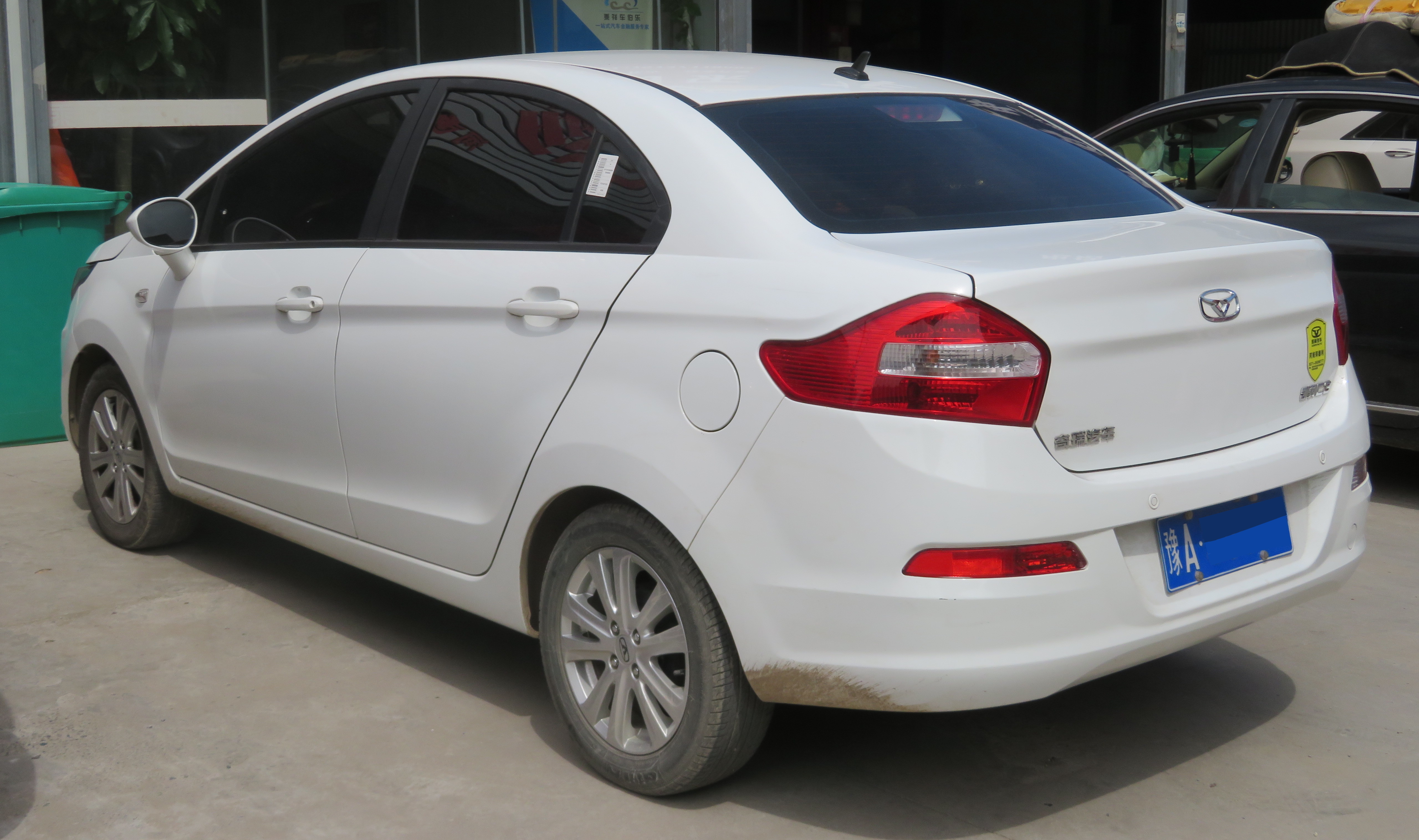
Chery Cowin C3 rear

The Cowin C3 and Cowin C3R prototype debuted during the 2014 Chengdu Auto Show in China,

The production version of the Cowin C3 subcompact sedan debuted during the 2014 Guangzhou Auto Show,

while the production Cowin C3 sedan was launched on the Chinese auto market in November shortly after its debut with prices ranging from 45,800 yuan to 51,800 yuan at launch. Prices of the Cowin C3 were later adjusted to 57,800 yuan to 60,800 yuan.

== Cowin C3R and Cowin C3R EV ==
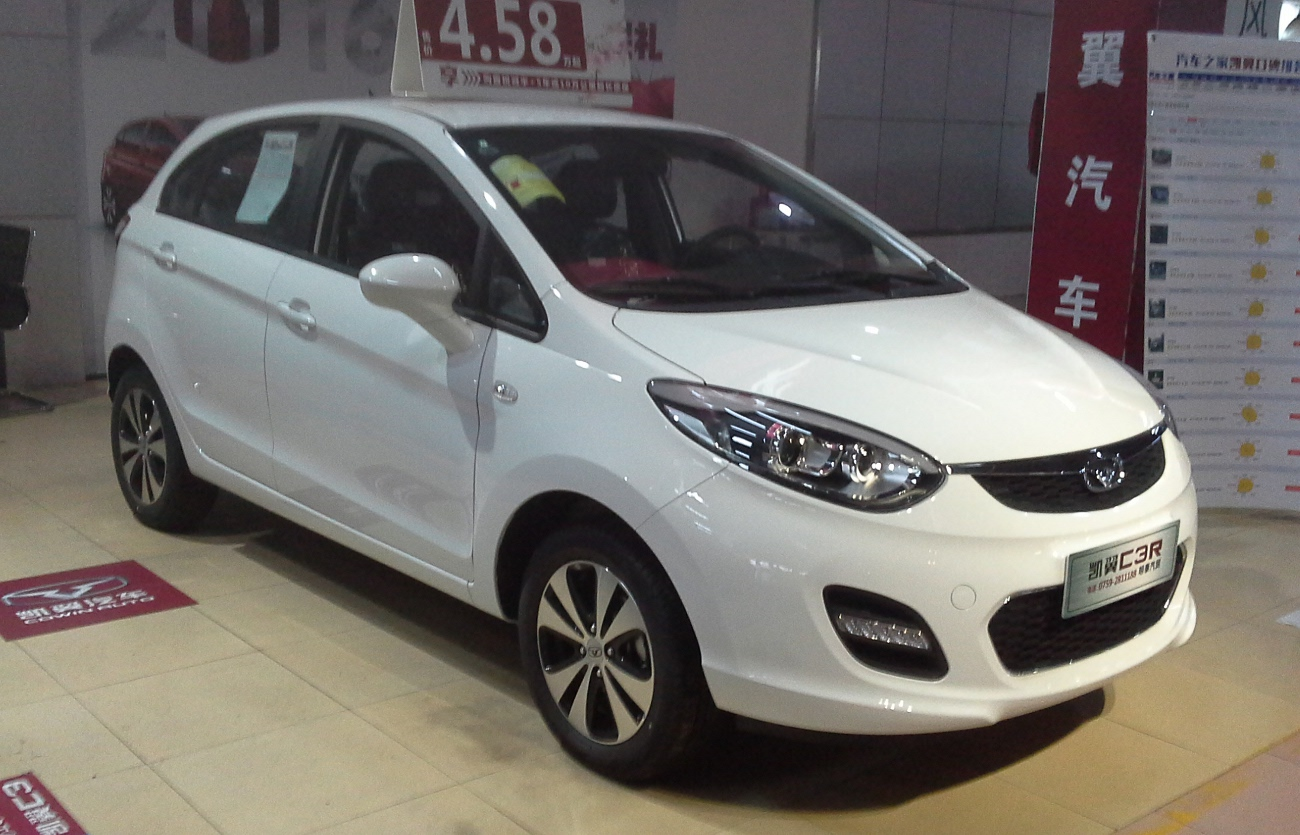
Cowin C3R

The Cowin C3R hatchback was launched later on the Chinese car market on April 8, 2015 with prices starting at 45,800 yuan and ending at 51,800 yuan ($7,378 – 8,334) at launch. Prices of the Cowin C3R were later adjusted to 57,800 yuan to 60,800 yuan which is same as the sedan.

An electric version called the Cowin C3R EV was later launched in October 2016 featuring an electric motor with 57 hp and 150 nm of torque. The range of the Cowin C3R EV is 200 kilometers and the top speed would be around 100 kilometers per hour.

== Chery eQ2 ==
The Chery eQ2 is a rebadged electric version of the Cowin C3. The eQ2 gets a 57-horsepower electric motor and a range of around 402 km. A model called the Chery New Energy eQ2 Driving School Version was released in 2018 and features a simulation of tachometer, clutch pedal, and five-speed shifter.
