= Cowin X3 =

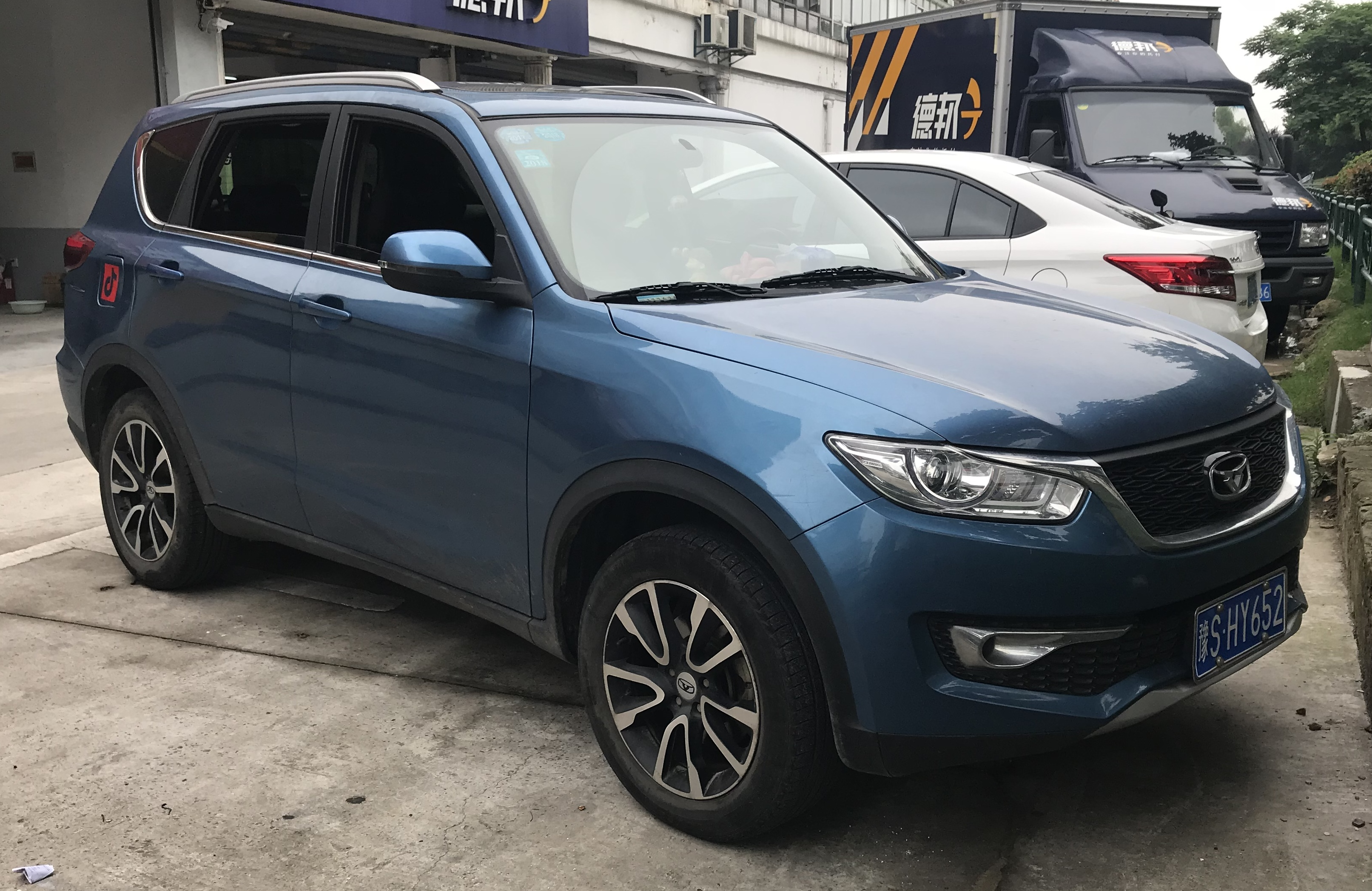

Overview
- Manufacturer: Kaiyi Auto
- Production: 2016–2022
- Assembly: Wuhu, Anhui, China
- Designer: Lowie Vermeersch at Granstudio

Body and chassis
- Class: Compact crossover SUV
- Body style: 5-door station wagon

Powertrain
- Engine: 1.6 L I4 (petrol)
- Transmission: 5-speed manual

Dimensions
- Wheelbase: 2,530 mm (99.6 in)
- Length: 4,335 mm (170.7 in)
- Width: 1,796 mm (70.7 in)
- Height: 1,665 mm (65.6 in)
- Curb weight: 1,340–1,385 kg (2,954–3,053 lb)

The Cowin X3 was a compact crossover SUV produced by the Chinese manufacturer Kaiyi Auto (formerly Cowin Auto, a subsidiary of Chery) since 2016. Production for the model was discontinued in 2022.

== Overview ==
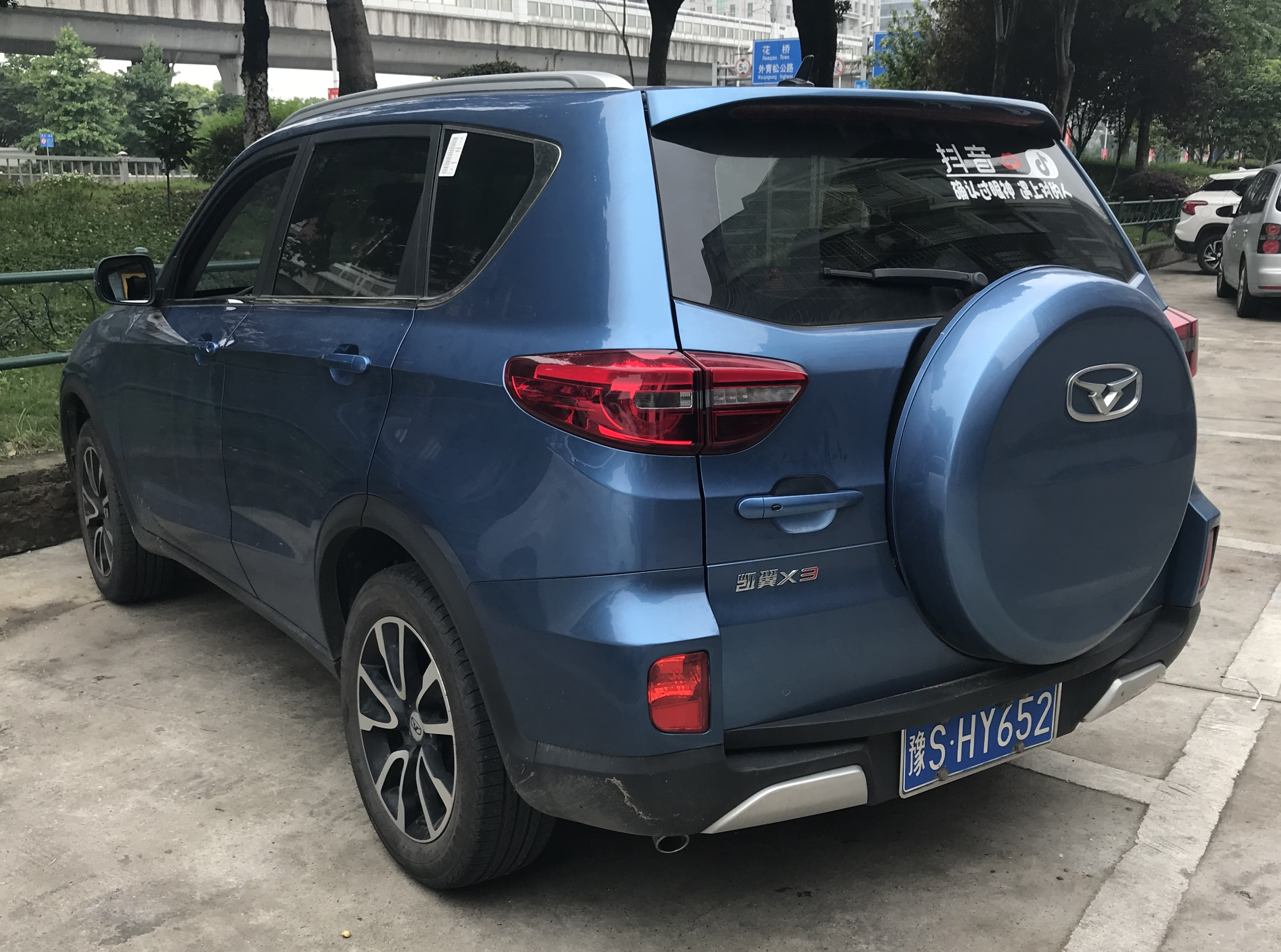
Cowin X3 rear

The vehicle debuted as the Cowin i-CX concept at the Chengdu Auto Show in August 2014.

The production car was unveiled at the Beijing Auto Show in April 2016 and is being sold in China since June 2016. The X3 is based on the Chery Tiggo 3 and has a spare wheel at the rear.

=== Powertrain ===
Like the Tiggo 3, the X3 is powered by a 93 kW (125 hp) 1.6-litre petrol engine. The vehicle has a 5-speed manual transmission as standard, and a continuously variable transmission is available as an option. In 2019, the engine was replaced by a 1.5-litre gasoline engine with 85 kW (114 hp; 116 PS). In 2021, a turbocharged 1.5-litre petrol engine with 115 kW (154 hp; 156 PS) added to the model range.
