= Kaiyi Auto =

Chinese automotive brand

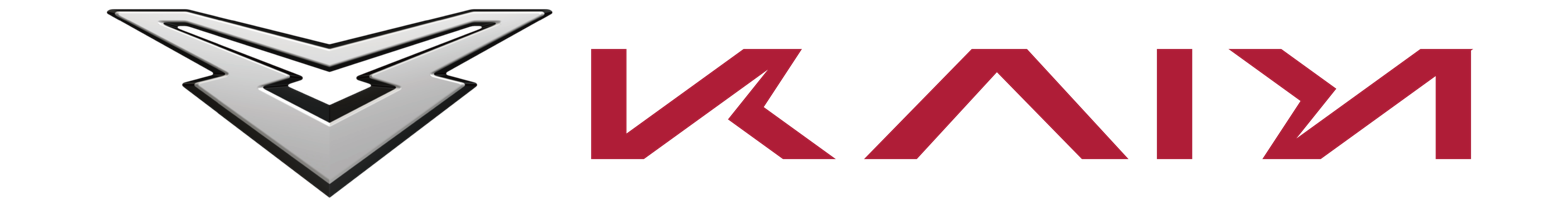
- Native name: Wuhu Kaiyi Automobile Co., Ltd
- Romanized name: Kǎiyì
- Type: Subsidiary
- Traded as: Kaiyi Auto
- Industry: Automotive
- Predecessors: Weier Automobile
- Founded: 2003; 23 years ago (as Chery subsidiary); 2014; 12 years ago (as Kaiyi Auto)
- Founders: Chery Automobile
- Headquarters: Yibin, China
- Area served: China; Middle East; Southeast Asia
- Products: Automobiles
- Owners: Yibin Automobile Industry Development Investment (Yibin Municipal Government) (82%); Chery Automobile (18%)
- Website: https://www.kaiyihome.com

Kaiyi Auto (official name Yibin Kaiyi Automobile Co., Ltd., Chinese: 凯翼, Kǎiyì) is a Chinese state-owned passenger vehicle manufacturer focuses on low-cost models. Founded in January 2014, it was originally a wholly owned subsidiary of Chery Automobile. In December 2017, after the equity change, it moved to Yibin City and was renamed Yibin Kaiyi Automobile Co., Ltd. In 2022, the brand was renamed from Cowin Auto (named after the Chery Cowin) to Kaiyi Auto. The brand is specialized on offering low cost models, targeted to young buyers.

== History ==
The origin of the Cowin name dates back to 2003 when it was introduced to identify the facelifted version of the Chery Fulwin (itself a licensed version of the first series of Seat Toledo as well as the first car produced by the Chery); subsequently, from 2009, Chery decided to reorganize its product range using this name to identify a sub-range of models that had reached end of the production cycle were still selling well; these were the Chery Cowin 1 (a facelifted QQ6), the Chery Cowin 2 (ex Chery Cowin / Fulwin), and Chery Cowin 3 (ex Chery A5).

Cowin Auto was established as a subsidiary of Chery in 2014 with the aim of developing a new niche in China's dynamically developing car market, targeting young buyers from medium-sized and small towns with low prices.

The first vehicle of Cowin as a standalone brand was the subcompact car C3 sedan and C3R hatchback, which went on sales in November 2014 – six months after its debut. In the following years, Cowin's lineup was expanded mainly in terms of SUVs and crossovers starting with the X3 in 2016. Then a year later, it was joined by the larger X5. In 2020, Cowin launched a more powerful car in the form of the E5,; at the same time, in an attempt to slow a decline in popularity of the brand, the Showjet were launched.

In July 2022, Cowin Auto announced a rebranding, changing its name to the more Chinese-sounding Kaiyi Auto, along with the design language of the models. The company presented a series of prototypes heralding a completely new model range. In December of the same year, the company's first new model after the rebranding went on sale in the form of a large SUV Kaiyi Kunlun. In January 2023, Kaiyi officially began distributing its cars in Russia, also starting local production of the Xuandu sedan under the name Kaiyi E5 at the Avtotor plant in Kaliningrad.

In October 2023, Kaiyi presented the first production model, an extension of the family of prototypes from the spring of the same year. A study of the i-EA 01 small electric hatchback evolved into the Kaiyi Shiyue.

=== Transfer of shares to the city of Yibin ===
In 2018, following a restructuring of the Chery shareholding, part of Cowin was sold to the city of Yibin through the subsidiaries Yibin Auto Industry Development Investment Co., Ltd. and Sichuan Yibin Pushi (PUSH) Group Co., Ltd. which took possession of 50.5% and 0.5% respectively. Chery Automobile retained a 49% stake.

Yibin City paid a total of RMB 2.5 billion for a 51% stake in Cowin (valuing the company at around RMB 5 billion, about $800 million). Cowin Auto's headquarters moved to Yibin, Sichuan and the company changed its official name to Yibin Kaiyi (Cowin) Automobile Co., Ltd.

On 7 January 2019, the new production plant in Yibin was inaugurated and the X5 goes into production. Production at the Chery plant in Wuhu will continue for the X3 model.

In 2022, Chery continued to reduce its shareholding in Kaiyi Auto and transferred it to the Yibin Municipal Government, while Chery retained a 18% stake.

== Overseas market ==
Kaiyi Auto began its international market in 2022, exporting models like the X3, X3 Pro, X3 Pro EV, and E5 to various countries. Kaiyi has entered over 30 markets, including those in Africa, South America, the Middle East, and Southeast Asia. In 2023, the company began producing cars locally in cooperation with Avitol in Kaliningrad Oblast, Russia.

Kaiyi E5 in Yekaterinburg, Russia

In 2024, Kaiyi entered the Cambodian market, where its vehicles were rebadged and sold as the GTV Kain and GTV Soben by GTV Motor Cambodia. In April 2025, Kaiyi entered the Philippine market under Fortune Electricars Philippines Corp. They also announced their new global market strategy in May 2025, with plans for further expansion and a sales target of 300,000 units annually.

Since February 2025, Paraguay has become one of Kaysi's strategic markets in South America through Golden Arrow S.A. The brand was introduced with the Kaiyi X3, a compact SUV designed to offer moder technology, comfort, and value. It was later joined by the Kaiyi X3 Pro, featuring significant upgrades in equipment, safety and connectivity.

In April 2026, Golden Arrow S.A. launched the first unit of Kaiyi X7 PHEV, the brand's flagship SUV, introducing Plug-in Hybrid technology to the Paraguayan lineup. A few months later, the range was further expanded with the arrival of the Kaiyi X7 Pro, the gasoline-powered version of the flagship SUV. Both models feature three-row seating for up to seven passengers, offering Paraguayan customers a broader range of family SUVs equipped with advanced technology and, in the case of the X7 PHEV, a New Energy Vehicle (NEV) powertrain.

== Products ==
=== Current models ===
- Kaiyi Porpoise E5/E7 (2025–present), light commercial vehicle, rebadged Karry Porpoise
- Kaiyi e-Qute 02/Shiyue (2023–present), city car, BEV
  - Kaiyi e-Qute 04/Shiyue Mate, 5-door variant
- Kaiyi X7/Kunlun (2022–present), compact SUV
- Kaiyi E5/Xuandu (2020–present), compact sedan, developed based on Chery Arrizo 7
- Kaiyi X3/Showjet (2020–present), subcompact SUV, rebadged Chery Tiggo 5x
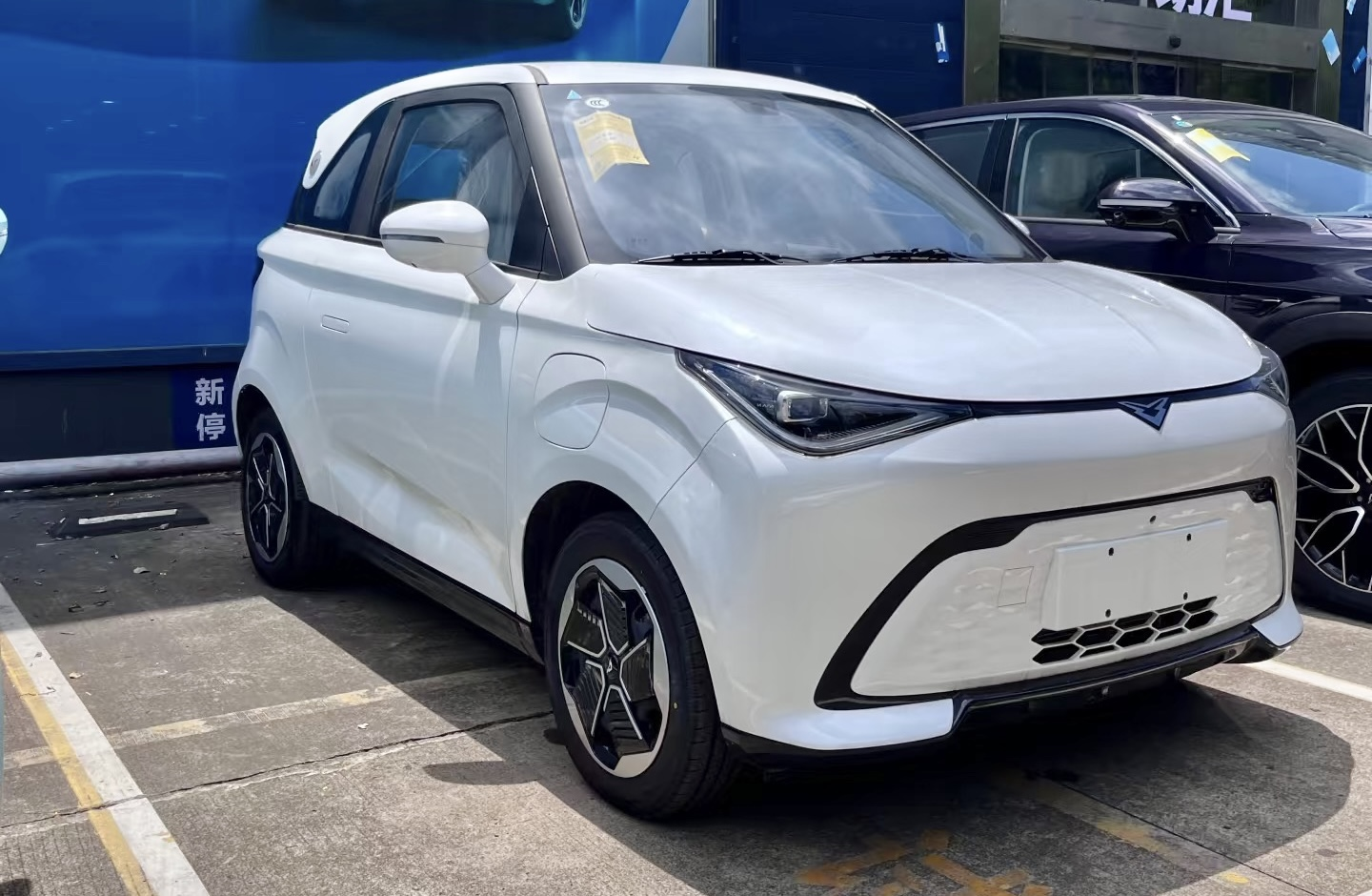
Kaiyi Shiyue

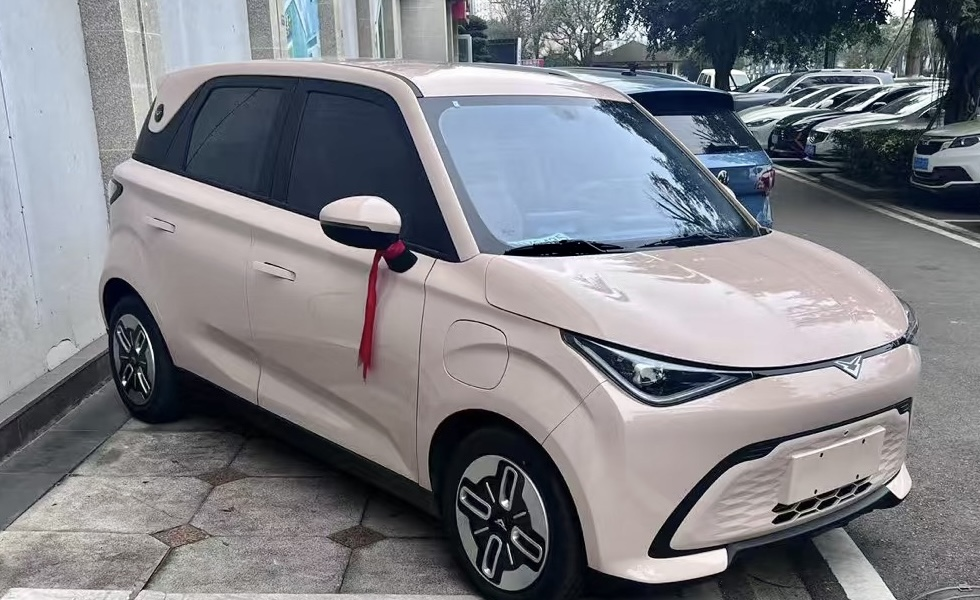
Kaiyi Shiyue Mate

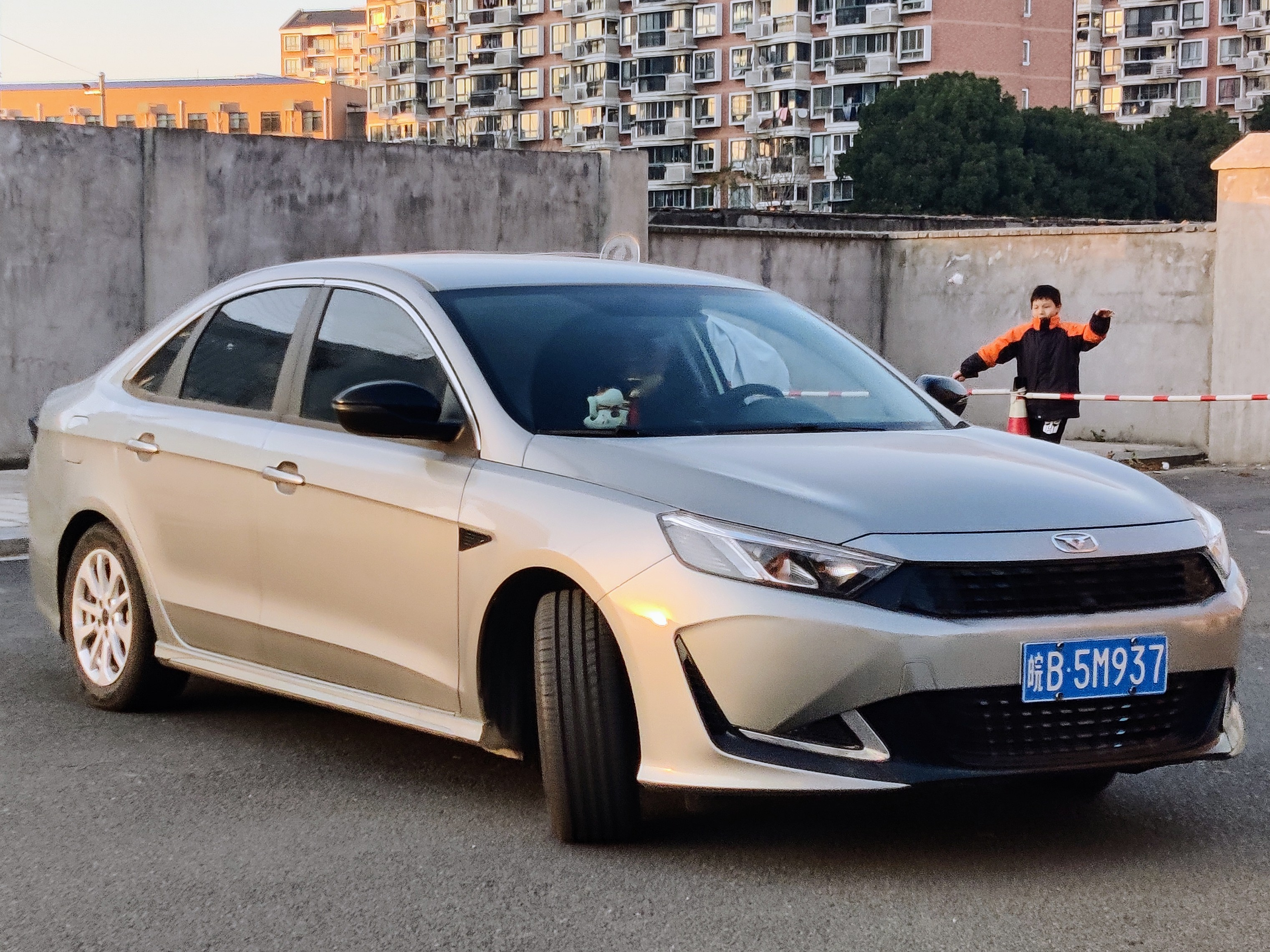
Kaiyi Xuandu

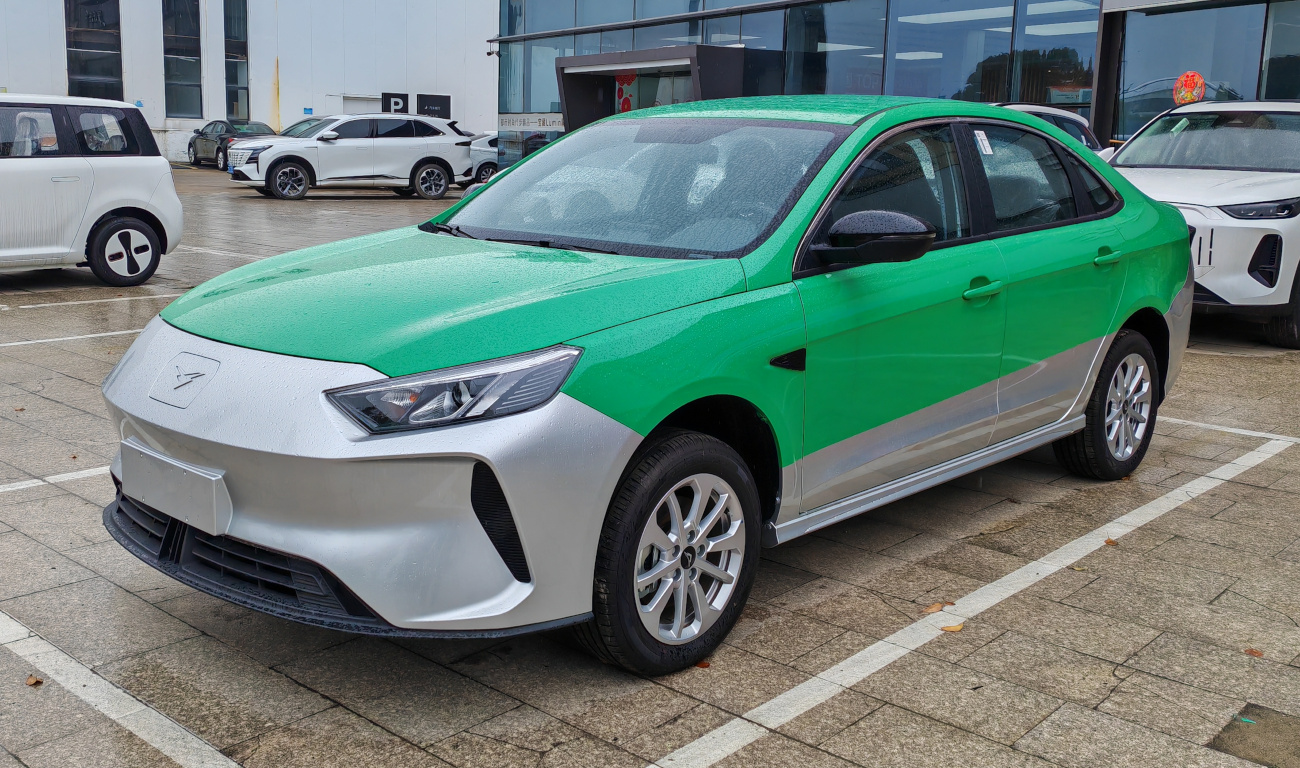
Kaiyi Xuandu EV

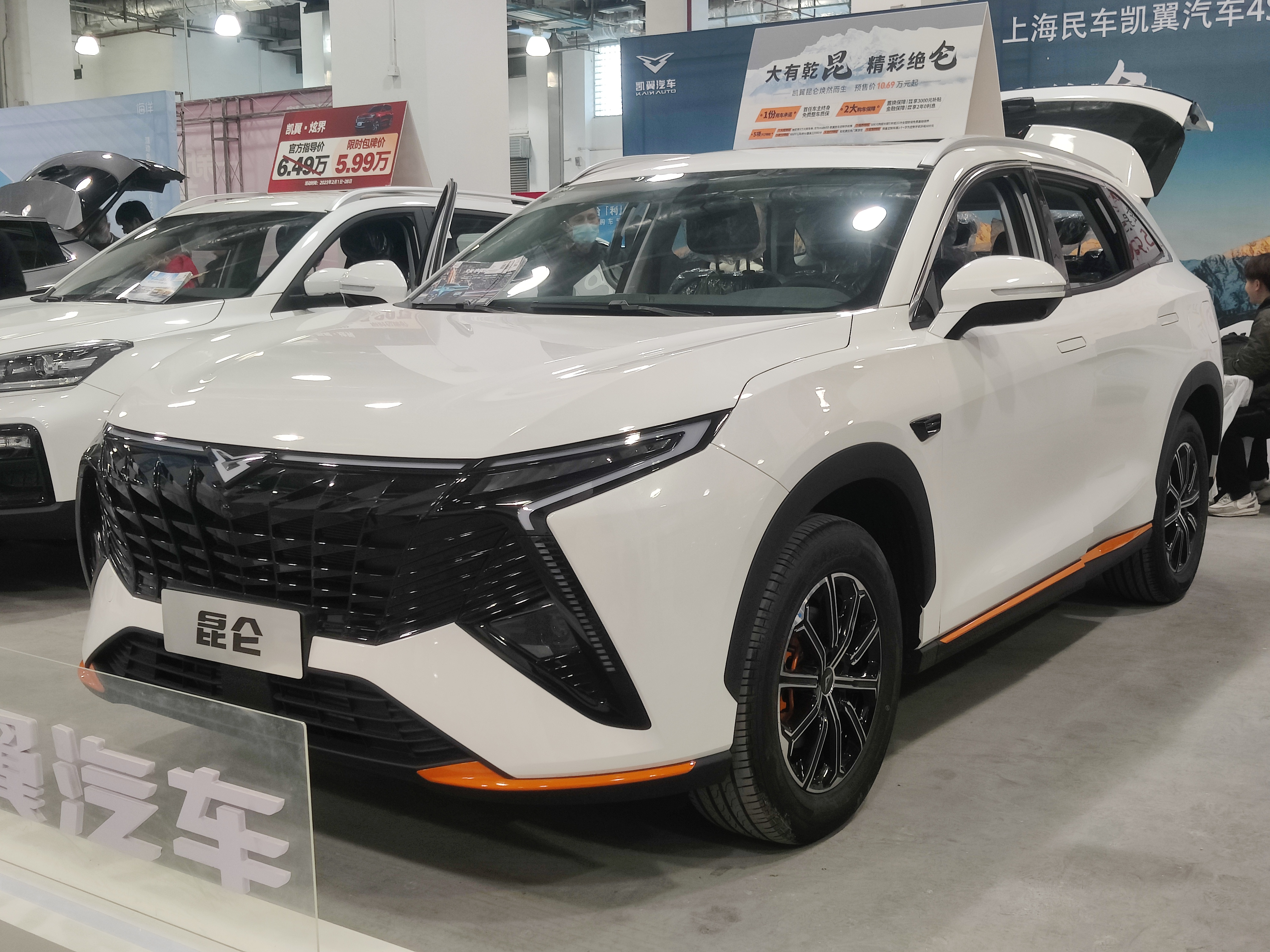
Kaiyi Kunlun

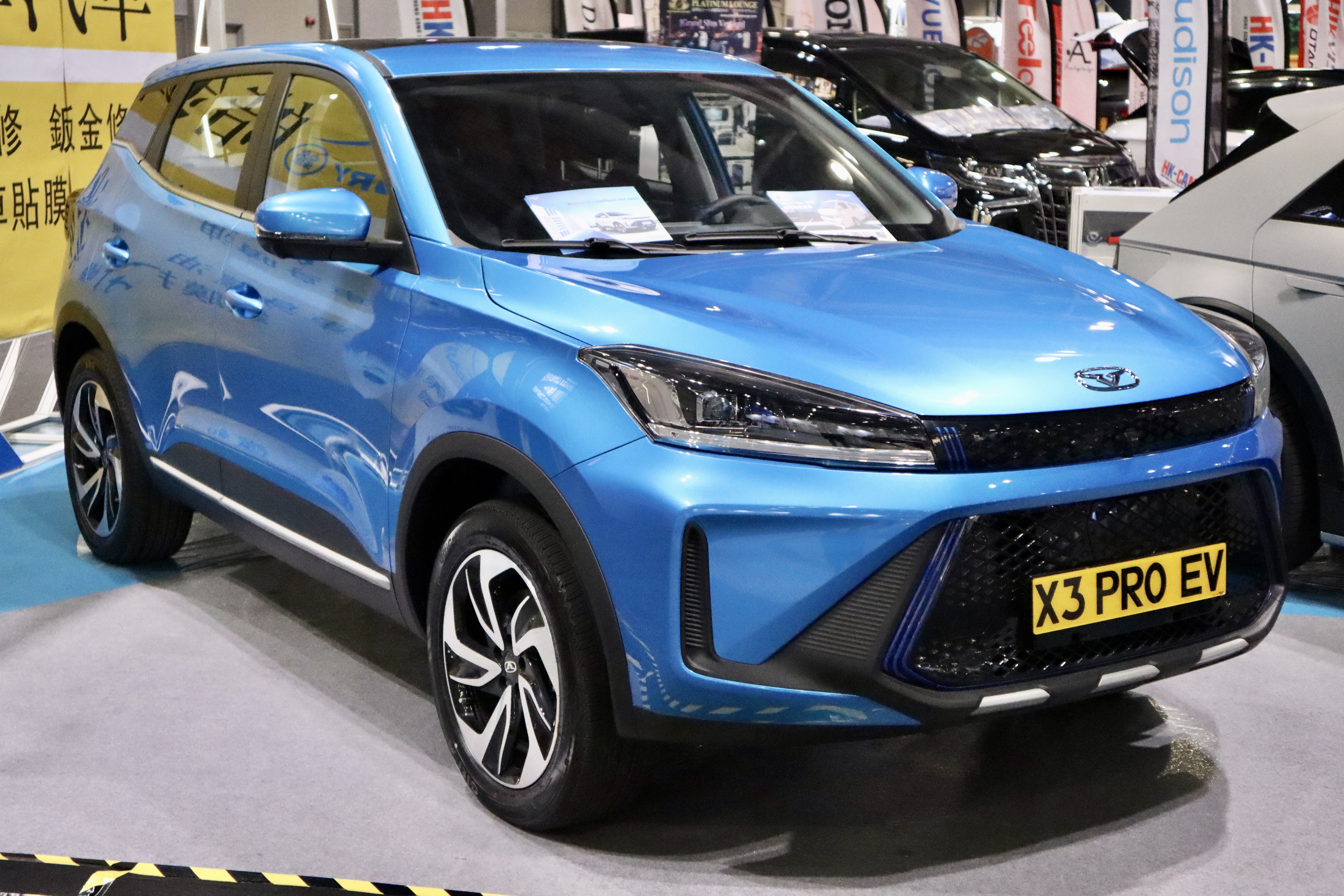
Kaiyi Showjet EV

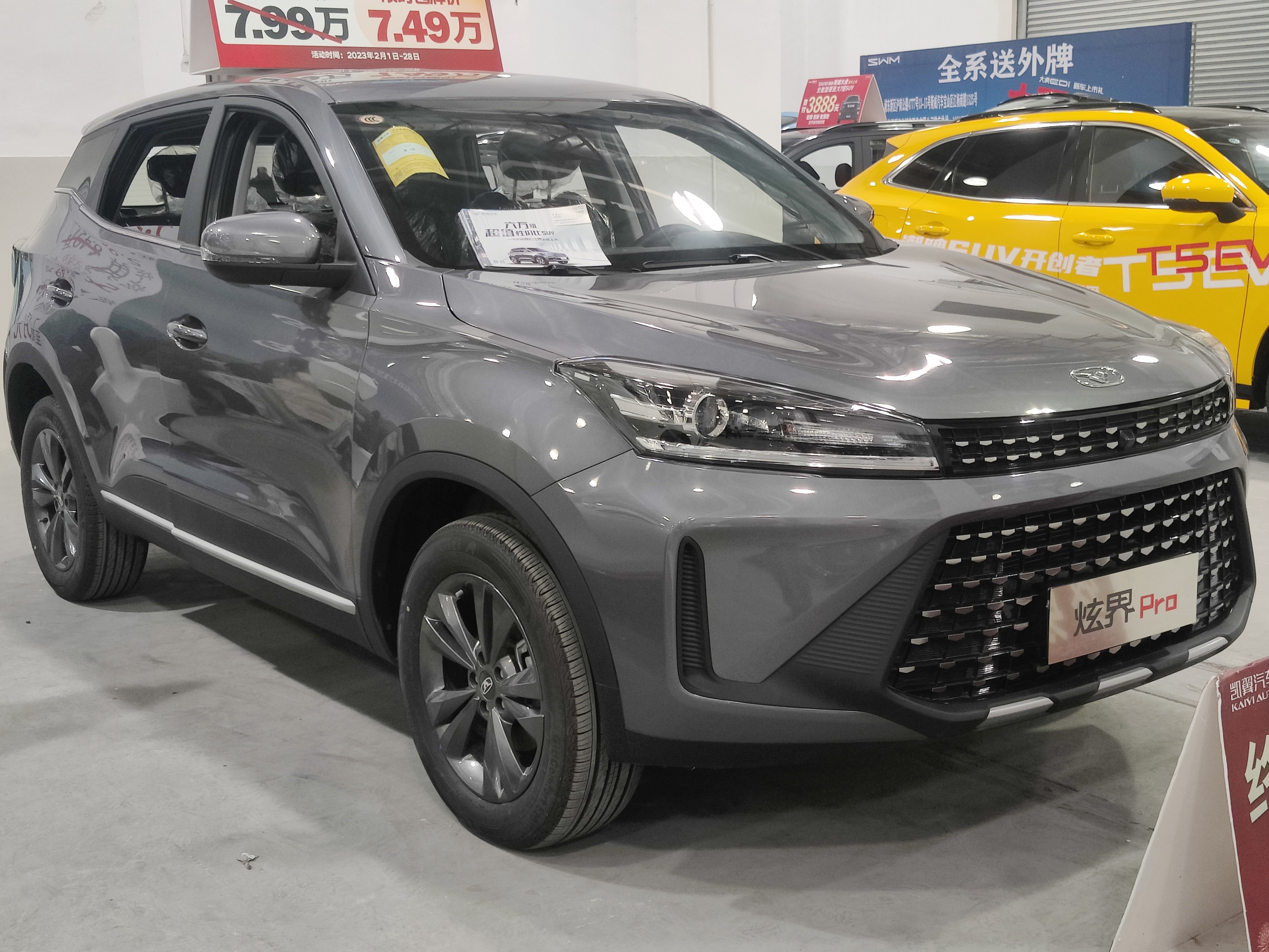
Kaiyi Showjet Pro

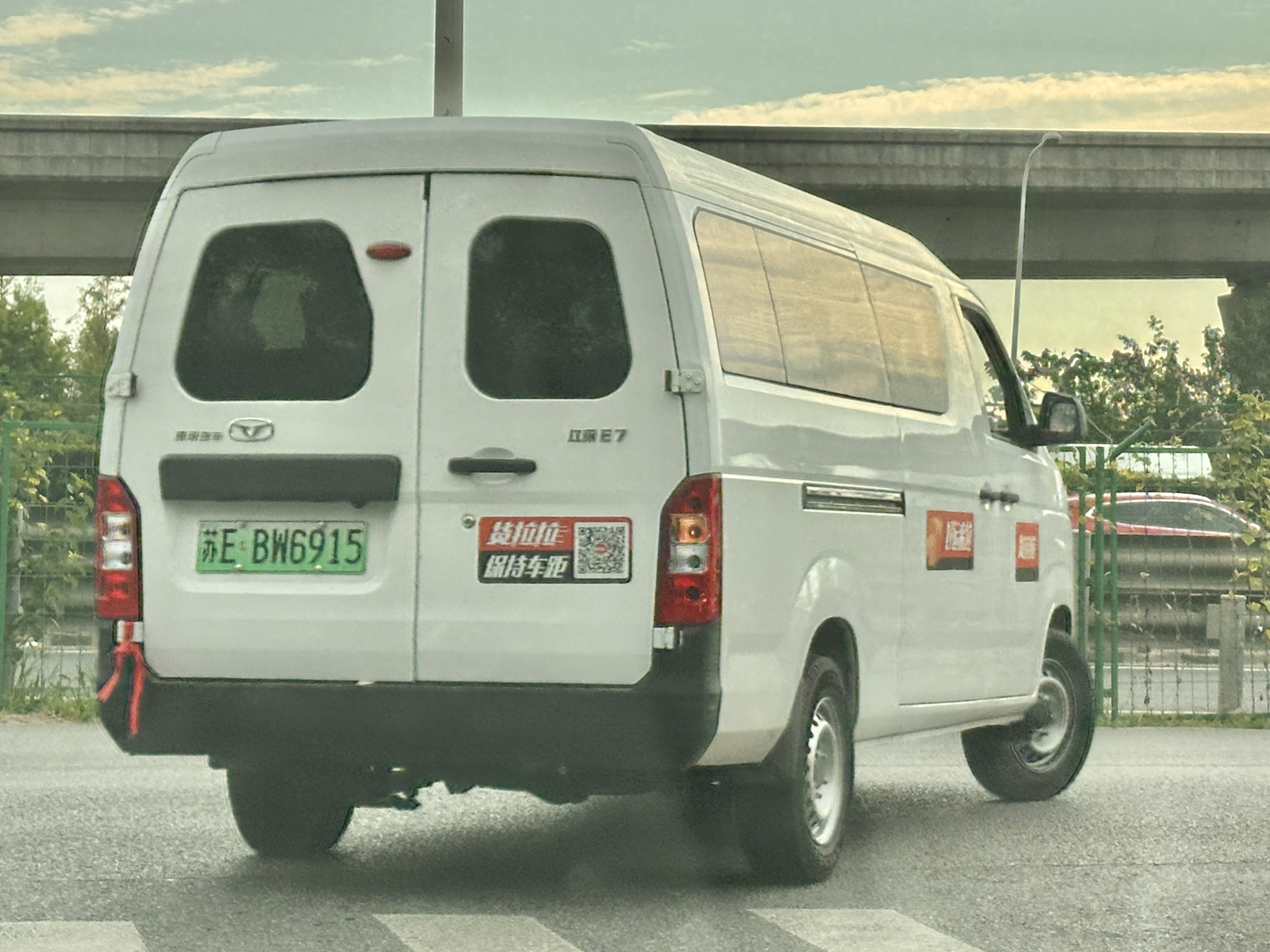
Kaiyi Porpoise E7

=== Former models ===
- Cowin C3 (2014–2020), subcompact sedan/hatchback
- Cowin E3 (2013–2015), subcompact sedan, rebadged Chery E3
- Cowin E5 EV (2019–2020), compact sedan, BEV, rebadged Chery Arrizo 5e
- Cowin X3 (2016–2022), subcompact SUV, rebadged Chery Tiggo 3
- Cowin X5 (2017–2019), subcompact SUV, rebadged Chery Tiggo 5
- Cowin V3 (2016–2017), subcompact SUV, rebadged Karry K60
- Kaiyi V7 (2022–2024), compact MPV, rebadged JAC Refine M3
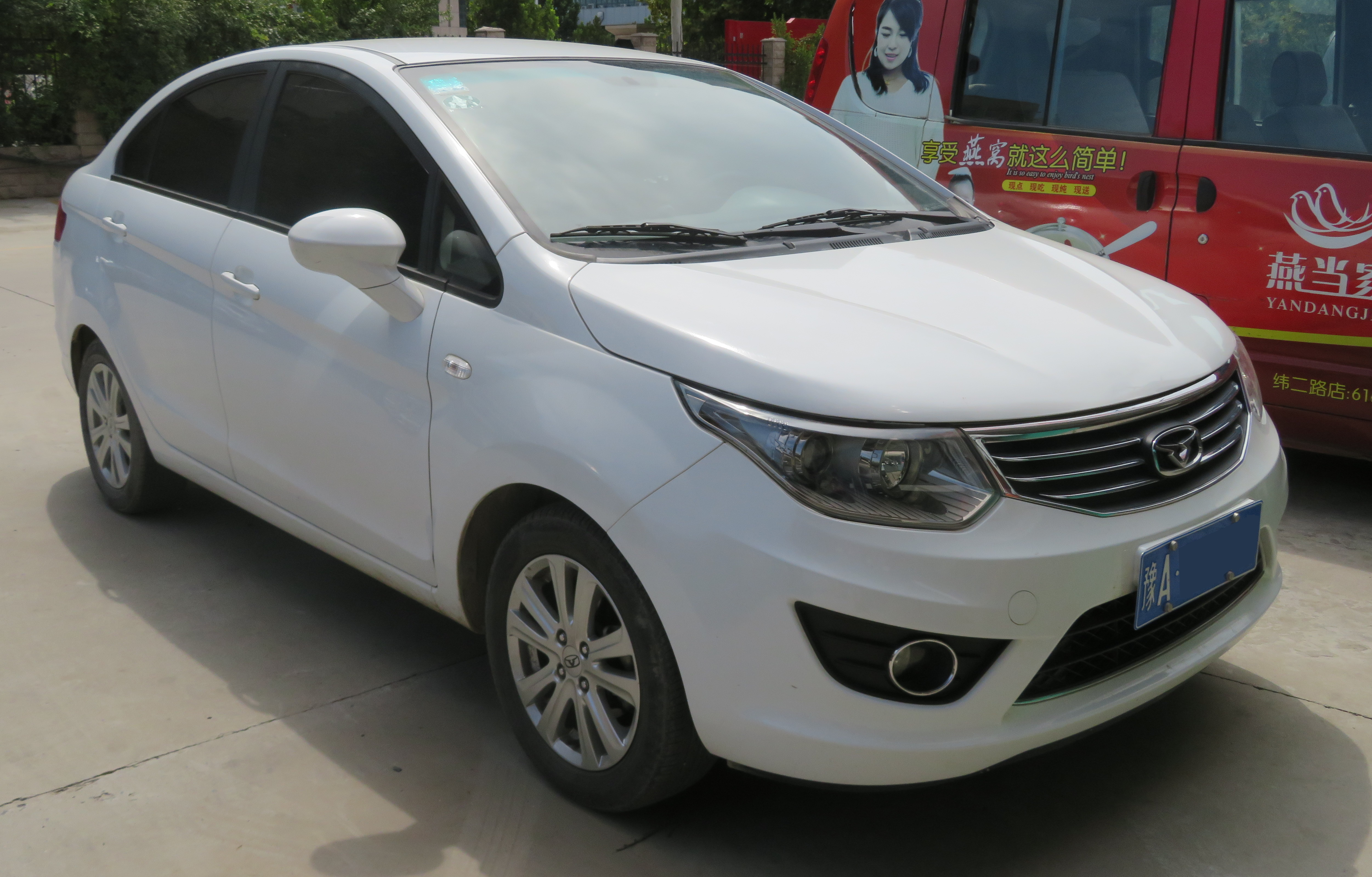
Cowin C3

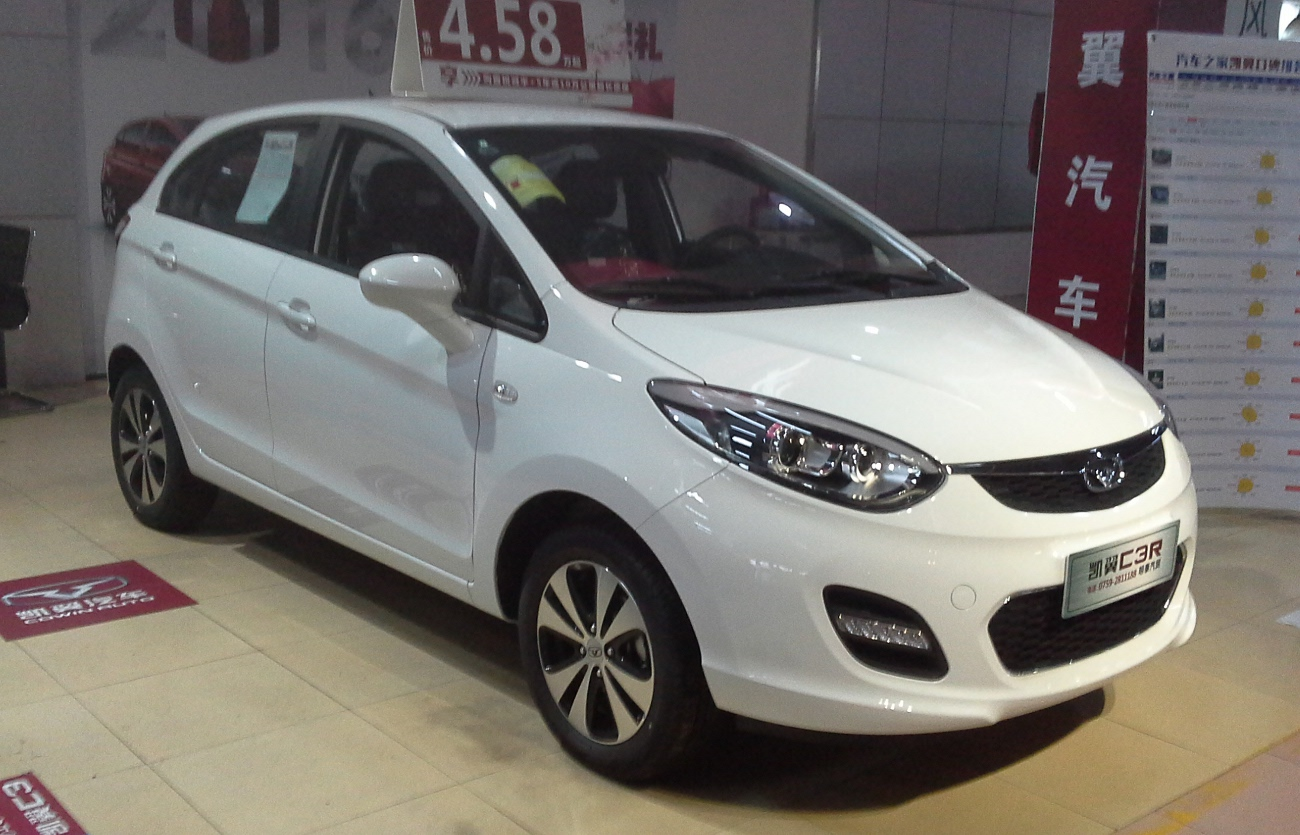
Cowin C3R

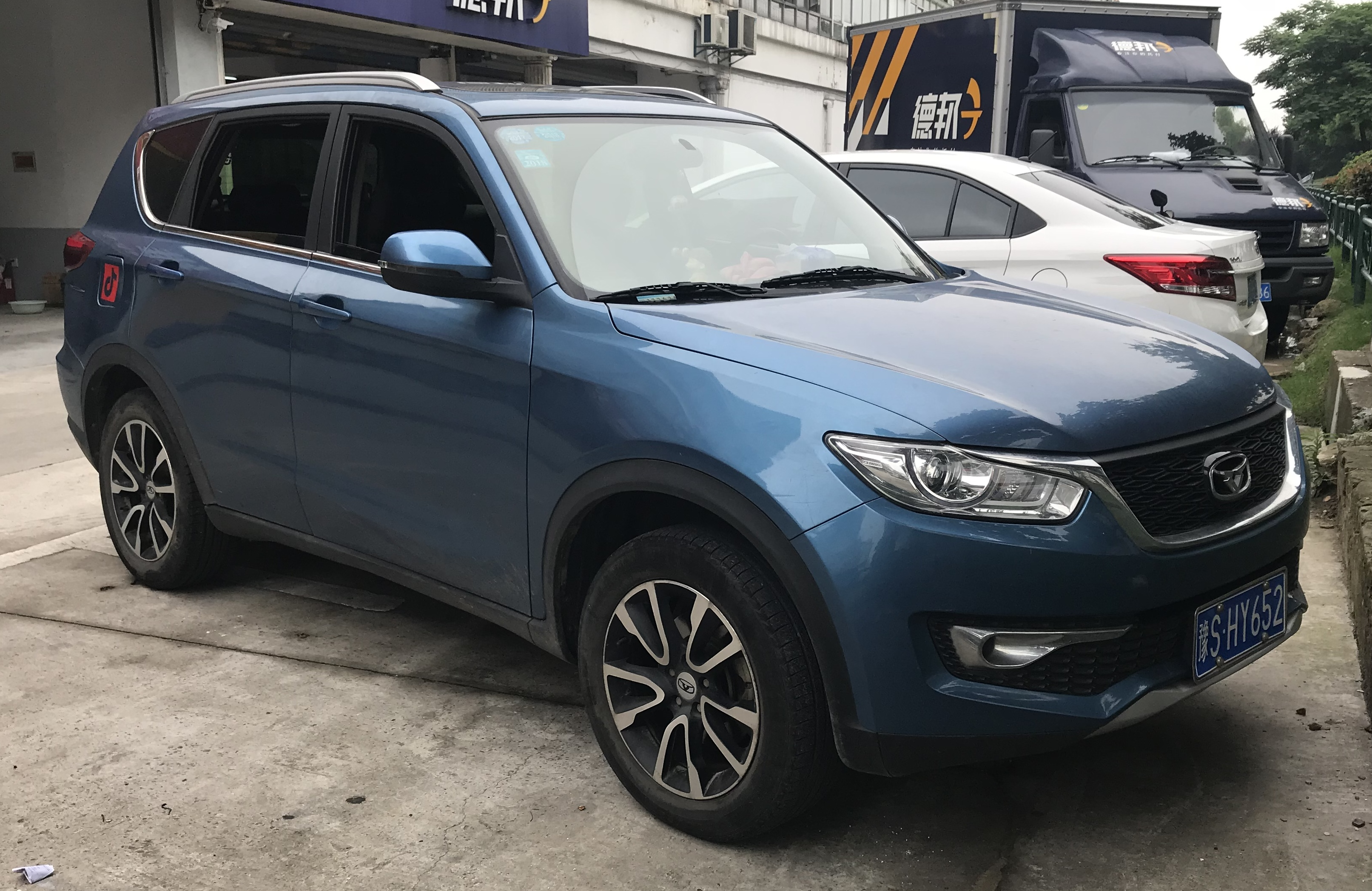
Cowin X3

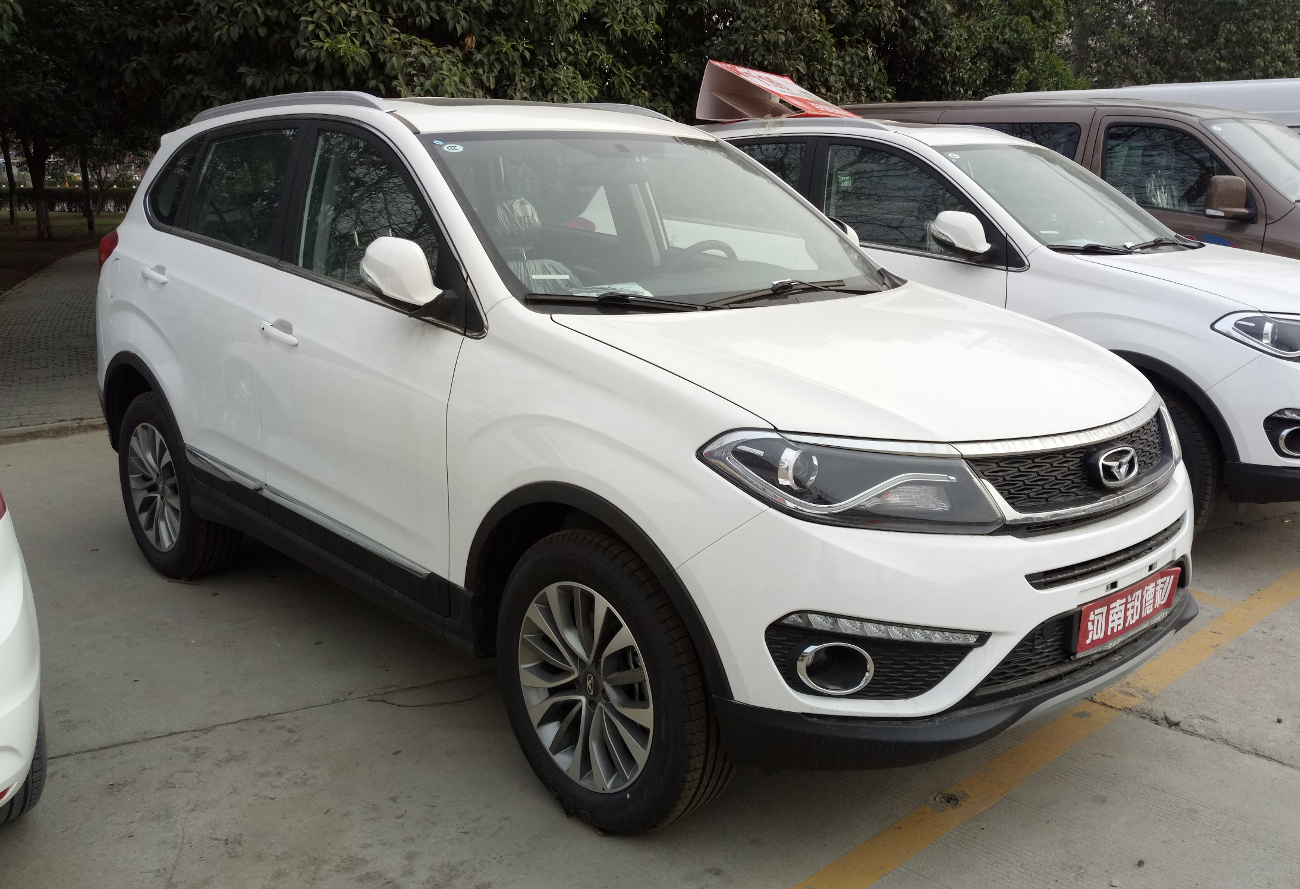
Cowin X5

== Sales ==
Sales of Kaiyi Auto
Year	Total
2015	24,000
2016	51,142
2017	43,000
2018	41,556
2019	32,900
2020	33,300
2021	20,300
2022	34,500
2023	52,013
2024	48,507
2025	54,099
