= Pininfarina Nido =

Italian concept car

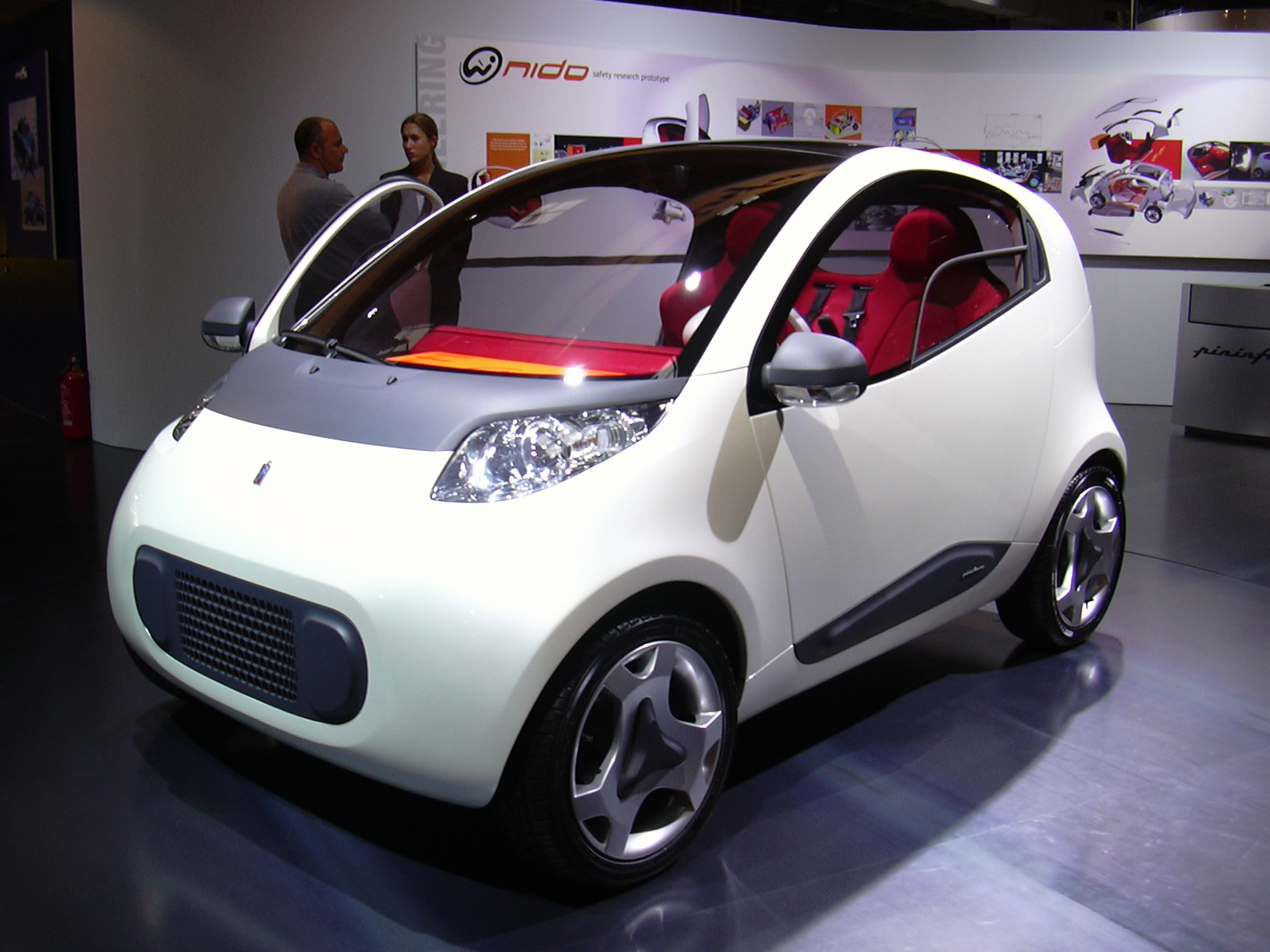

Overview
- Manufacturer: Pininfarina
- Designer: Lowie Vermeersch at Pininfarina

Body and chassis
- Class: Concept car
- Body style: 2-seater city car
- Layout: RR layout

Powertrain
- Engine: Rear engine
- Transmission: Automatic gearbox

Dimensions
- Wheelbase: 2,068 mm (81.4 in)
- Length: 2,890 mm (113.8 in)
- Width: 1,674 mm (65.9 in)
- Height: 1,534 mm (60.4 in)

The Pininfarina Nido is a concept car designed by Pininfarina and introduced at the 2004 Paris Motor Show. In Italian, the word Nido means nest, in fact the single-box shape of the car conveys an impression of a protective nest surrounding the occupants.

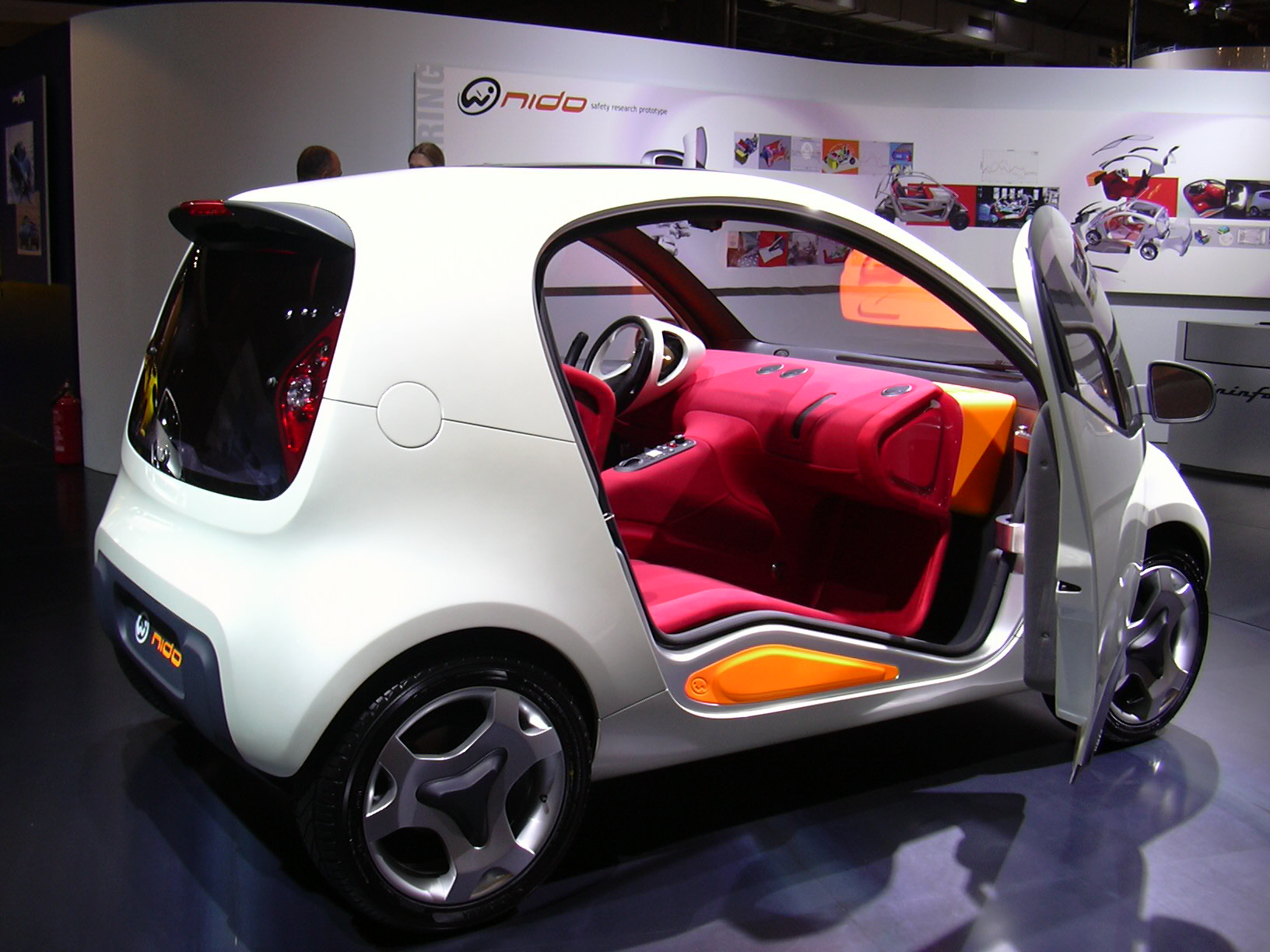
Pininfarina Nido (2004)

== Context ==
This small two-seater city car has been strongly oriented towards safety for both the occupants and pedestrians in the event of a collision, by means of structural solutions, the distribution of the spaces and the management of the shape of the car itself. The concept was conceived through an intense collaboration between design and engineering, with the goal of creating an attractive, small and safe vehicle.

According to Lowie Vermeersch, the design director who led the Nido project, this vehicle is a clear example of how active Pininfarina is in the fields of innovation and research into the mobility of the future.

Nido consists of 3 principal elements:

1. A chassis made of a deformable front section and a rigid safety cell surrounding the occupants.
2. A shell for the occupants, which is actually a sled able to run horizontally along a central runner within the rigid cell.
3. Two energy dissipating absorbers with controlled rigidity achieved by the combination of three honeycomb sections of different density that connect the rigid cell and the sled.

== Awards ==
The Pininfarina Nido was awarded the Most Beautiful Car in the World in the Prototypes and concept cars category; the ADI Compasso d'Oro 2008 in the section dedicated to projects which anticipate new trends in transportation design; and was displayed in the temple of modern art, the Museum of Modern Art of New York.

== Style ==
The essential body styling of the prototype reflects the concept and highlights the project’s consistency of shape and structure. The shape and finishings contribute to emphasise the elements correlated to safety and confers a friendly and reassuring character to the car. The surfaces appear as a skin stretched over a structure, thus emphasising the shape of the structure itself. The front of the vehicle is characterised by horizontal lines that refer to the motion of the sled shell, while the rear is more raked to confer a dynamic quality and features a low waistline, a very wide windscreen and a transparent roof to ensure excellent visibility. The front moulding is completely covered with a cushion of energy absorbing material to present safer surfaces in the event of collision with a pedestrian, and thus minimise injury. The headlights are mounted high to increase the deformable area presented during collision with a pedestrian.

== Nido EV ==
In 2010, on the occasion of Pininfarina 80th anniversary, was presented the Pininfarina Nido EV, the electric version of the 2004 concept car.

The Nido EV was designed and built entirely by the Pininfarina Design and Engineering Centre of Cambiano (Turin) to explore the concept of a small electric car for urban use. The Nido EV is a two-seater small city car (900 kg, 2.95 m long 1.5 m high) with a rear-mounted 60 kW electric motor powered by a Li-ion battery rated at 22 kWh giving it a range of 140 km, an electronically limited top speed of 120 km/h and a 0 – 60 km/h time of 4.4 seconds. Retaining the external appearance of the original Nido, the prototype Nido EV uses a modular tubular steel frame that allows different body versions (2 seater, 2+1 seater, ‘pick up’ and light van) and different mechanical layouts to be implemented, including hybrid versions.

== Next Generation Nido EV ==
To show the potential of new materials for reducing the weight of electric and hybrid vehicles and hence increasing their range the existing Nido EV was selected as a demonstrator test bed for the EVolution project. Evolution is a four-year collaborative project between 24 European organisations funded by the European Commission under the 7th Framework Programme.

The existing Nido EV design is being further developed by using a Multifunctional-Rolling-Chassis (MRC) enabled by a new generation of highly hybridized structural components and complemented by a non-structural upper-body. Advanced polymer based materials and aluminium alloys and foams are being used to create novel super-lightweight hybrid components complying with safety standards and recycling constraints. The EVolution goal is to demonstrate the sustainable production of a 600 kg weight Nido EV by the end of 2015.
