= Chery Arrizo 7 =

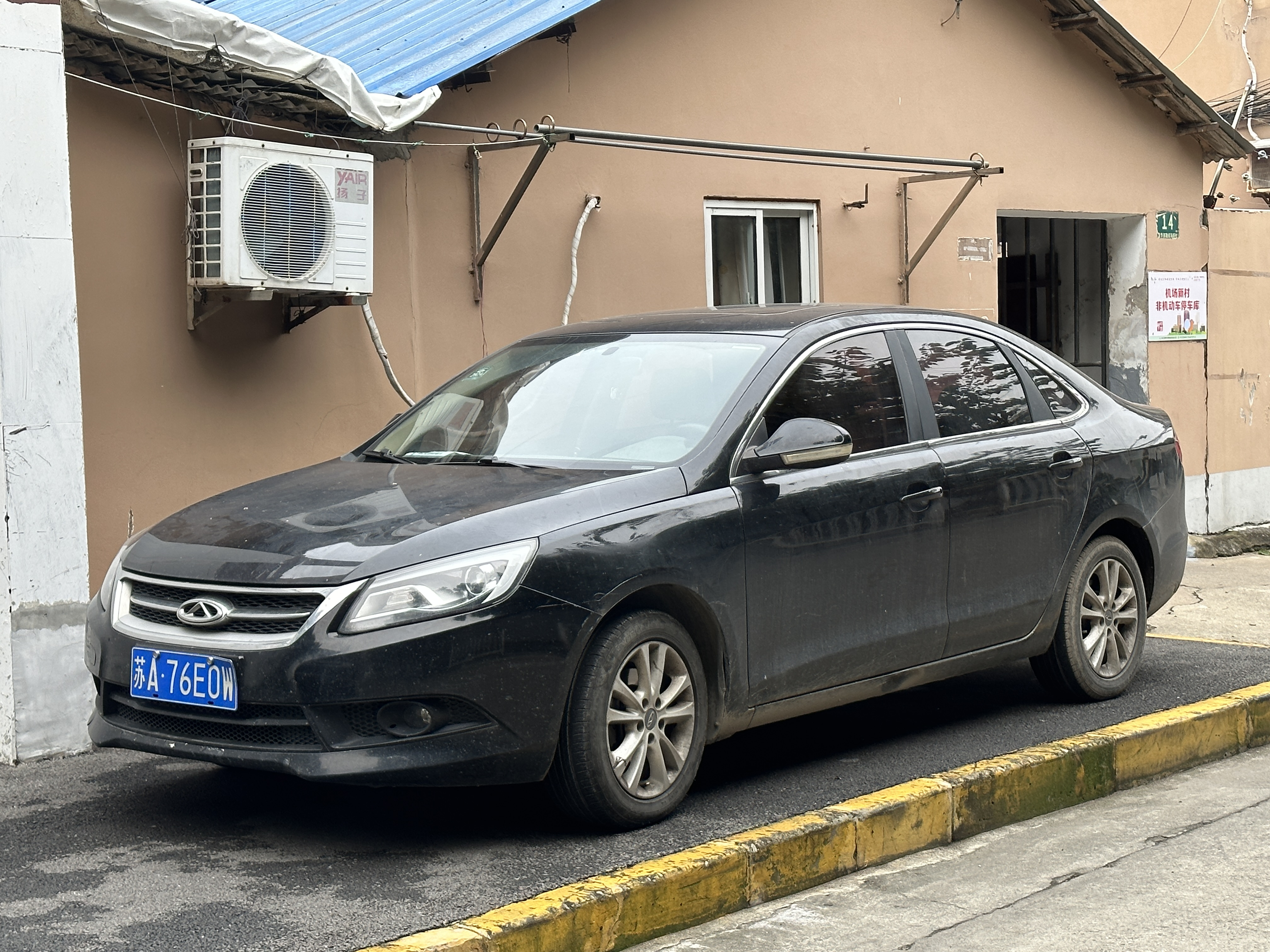

Overview
- Manufacturer: Chery
- Production: 2013–present

Body and chassis
- Class: Compact sedan (C)
- Body style: 4-door sedan

The Chery Arrizo 7 (Chinese: 艾瑞泽7) is a compact sedan produced by Chinese automobile manufacturer Chery. It is the first vehicle of the Arrizo series. The first generation Arrizo 7 was produced from 2013 to 2018 as a A+ segment sedan in the Chinese market, which is a slightly larger compact sedan. The second generation was planned to be unveiled during the 2026 Chengdu Auto Show in August 2026.

== First generation (2013) ==
Chery Arrizo 7 I
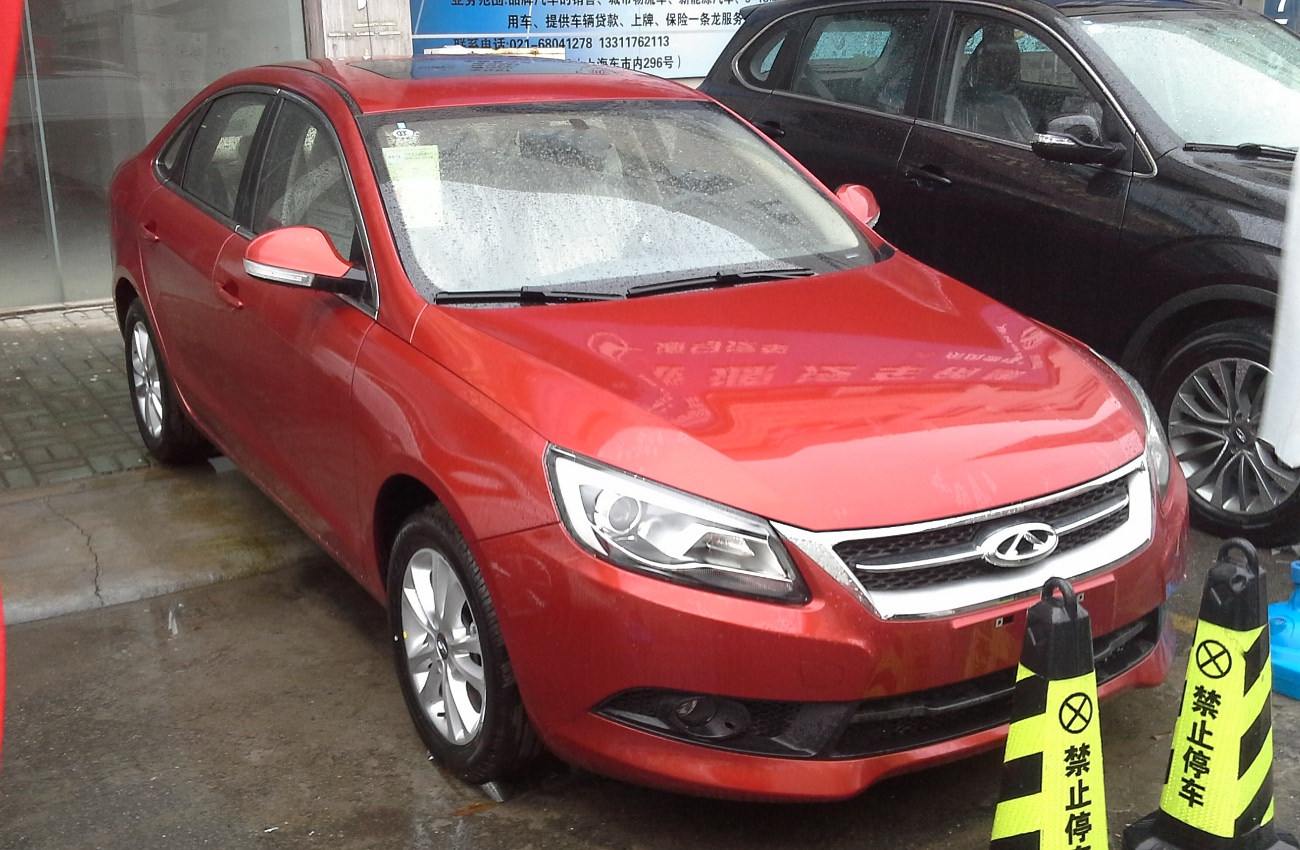

Overview
- Manufacturer: Chery
- Also called: Chery A4
- Production: 2013–2018
- Assembly: Wuhu, Anhui, China
- Designer: James Brain Hope; Hakan Saracoğlu; Klaus Badenhausen; Qiu Yan

Body and chassis
- Class: Compact car (C)
- Body style: 4-door sedan
- Layout: Front-engine, front-wheel-drive
- Platform: Chery M1X
- Related: Kaiyi Xuandu

Powertrain
- Engine: 1.5 L SQRE4T15 I4 turbo (petrol); 1.6 L SQRE4G16 I4 (petrol)
- Transmission: 5-speed manual CVT

Dimensions
- Wheelbase: 2,700 mm (106.3 in)
- Length: 4,650 mm (183.1 in)
- Width: 1,820 mm (71.7 in)
- Height: 1,480 mm (58.3 in)

Chronology
- Predecessor: Chery Eastar

The first generation Arrizo 7 was previewed by the Chery Alpha 7 concept that debuted on the 2013 Shanghai Auto Show. The production version was launched on the Chinese auto market in late 2013 with prices ranging from 78,900 to 126,900 yuan.

Power of the Arrizo 7 comes from two engine options, one being a 1.6 liter engine producing 126 hp and 160 nm, mated to a 5-speed manual gearbox or a CVT. The later added 1.5 liter turbo engine option produces 147 hp and 220 nm, and is mated to the same 5-speed manual gearbox or a CVT.

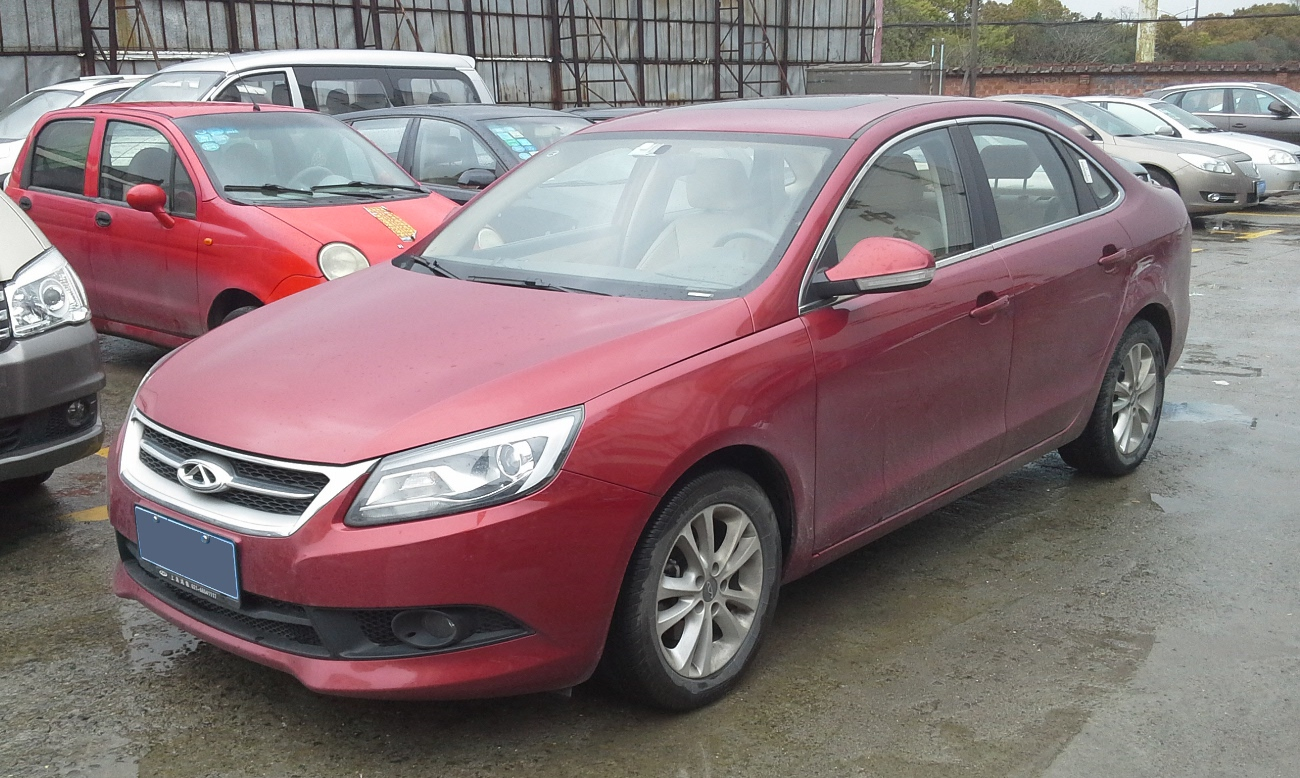
Chery Arrizo 7 front

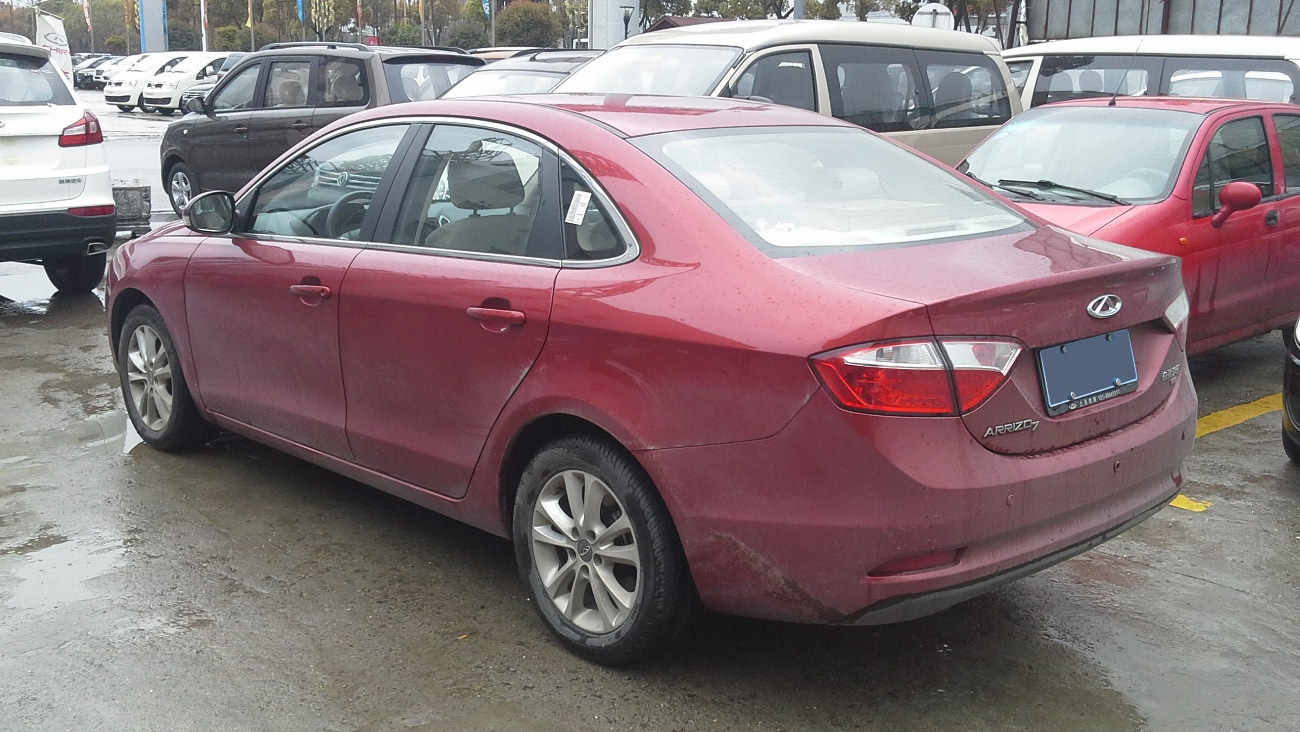
Chery Arrizo 7 rear

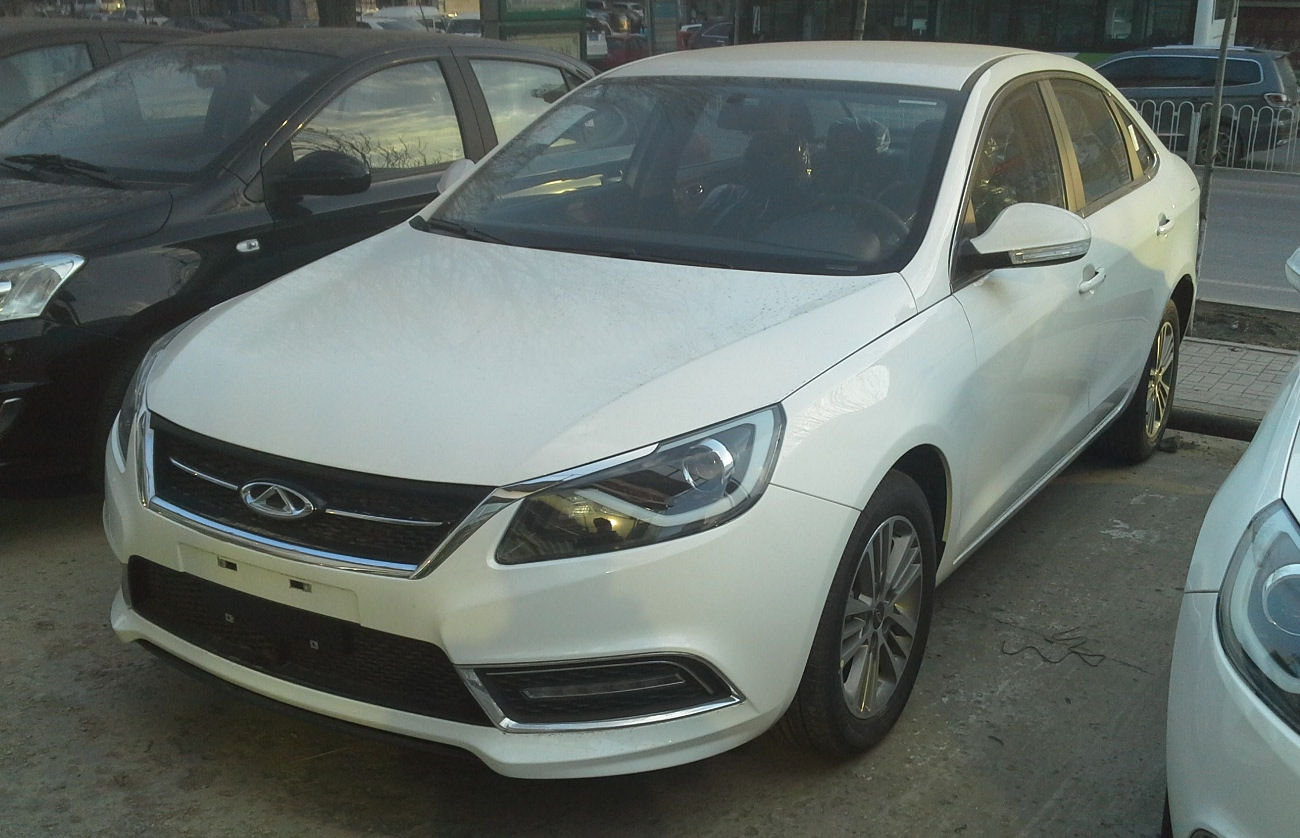
Chery Arrizo 7 facelift front

=== Arrizo 7e ===
The Chery Arrizo 7e is the plug-in hybrid electric vehicle (PHEV) variant of the Arrizo 7 sedan. Being launched in the Chinese market in early 2016, the pricing of the Arrizo 7e starts from 179,900 yuan. The plug-in hybrid system consists of a 126 hp (94 kW; 128 PS) 1.6L I4 engine and an electric motor with 75 hp (56 kW). The battery capacity is 9.3 kWh, producing a range of 50 kilometers on pure electric power and a 5 hours charging time. Fuel consumption is 2.2 liters per 100 kilometers. Top speed is 180 km/h (112 mph) with a total weight of 1,590 kilograms (3,510 lb).

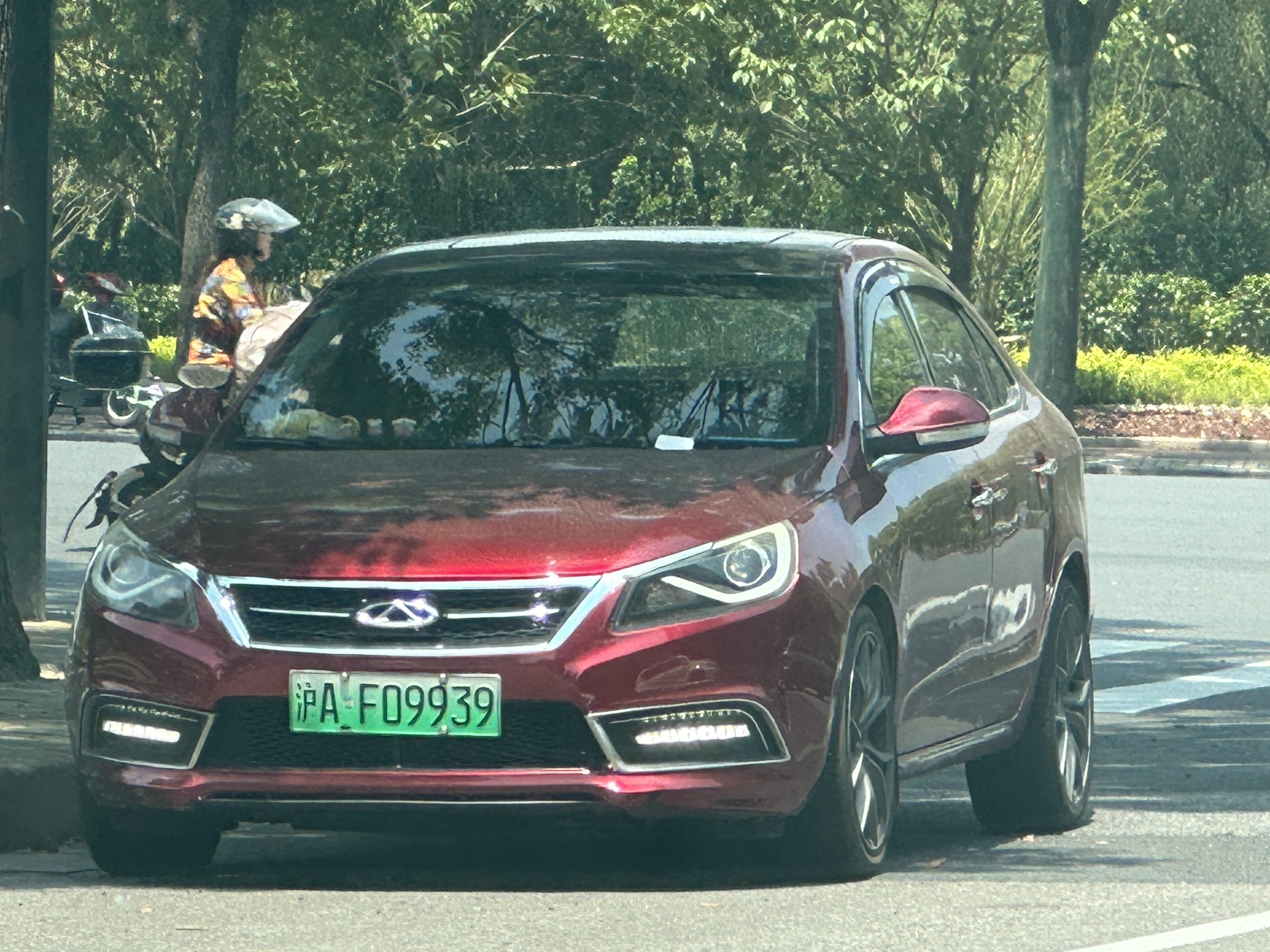
Chery Arrizo 7e

== Second generation (2026) ==
Chery Arrizo 7 II

Overview
- Manufacturer: Chery
- Production: To be commenced
- Assembly: Wuhu, Anhui, China
- Designer: Peter Gong

Body and chassis
- Class: Compact car (C)
- Body style: 4-door sedan
- Layout: Front-engine, front-wheel-drive

The second generation Arrizo 7 was originally designed to be the next generation Arrizo 5. First leaked in February 2025 as a more concept-car-like patent images that was originally submitted in May 2024. A later leak in September 2025 includes patent images showing a more production-like design of two versions of front and rear end styling for the compact sedan. The last patent images that surfaced was from August 17 2026, showing sharp designs of one of the previous front and rear end styling directions that evolved from the earliest leak of the more conceptual design with a confirmed connection to the Arrizo 7 name. 2 days later in August 19 2026, Chery officially unveiled a set of press images showing the second generation Arrizo 7 sedan in the more conservative styling direction with a planned launch date set during the 2026 Chengdu Auto Show.
