= Granstudio =

Granstudio S.p.A.
- Industry: Automotive
- Founded: Turin, Italy (2011)
- Founder: Lowie Vermeersch
- Headquarters: Turin, Italy
- Key people: Lowie Vermeersch, CEO & creative director; Giovanni Piccardo, chief styling; Goran Popović, chief design development
- Services: Automotive design Mobility design Interaction design
- Number of employees: 74 (2026)
- Website: www.granstudio.com

Granstudio is an international creative consultancy, headquartered in Turin, Italy. It was founded in 2011 by Lowie Vermeersch, a Flemish designer and the former design director at Pininfarina.

As a design consultancy, the studio defines, designs and develops cars and other mobility means for a variety of international companies. The studio specializes in three core areas: automotive design, interaction design, and mobility design. In addition to its design activities, it also provides strategic support to enhance the design process through innovation and the integration of advanced technologies.

The studio is headquartered in Turin, Italy, with a secondary office in Kortrijk, Belgium.

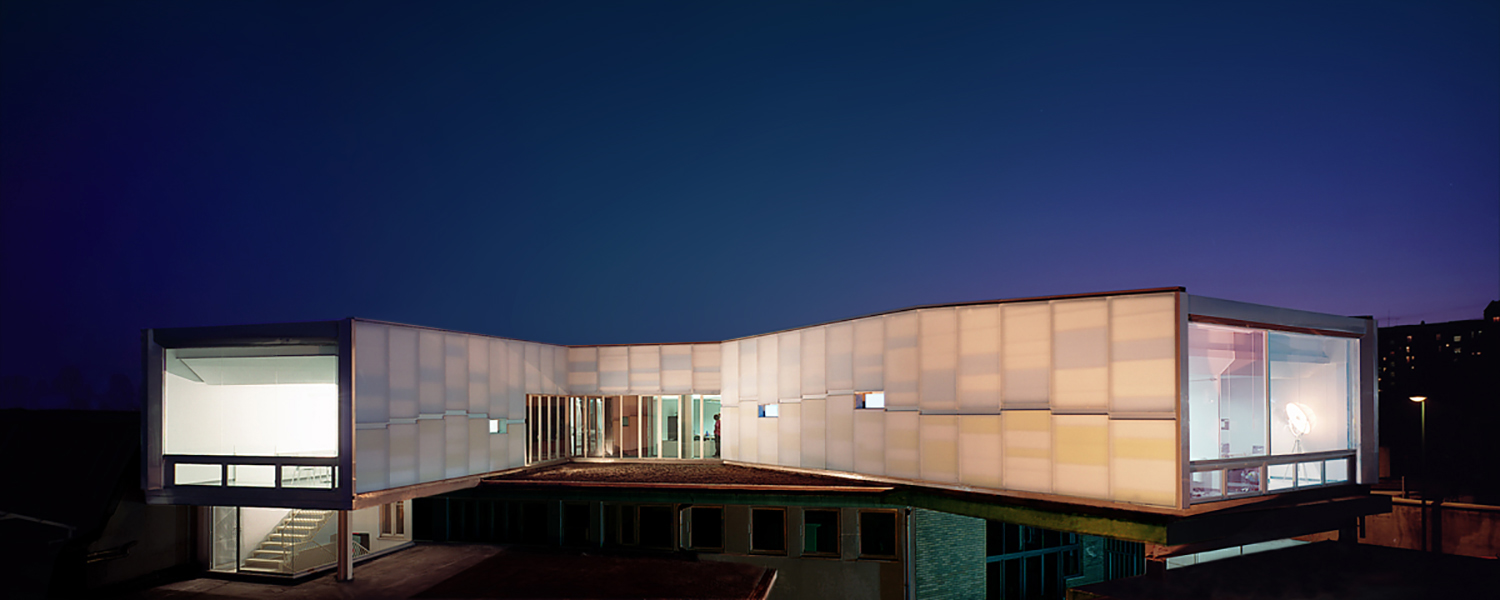
Granstudio's Headquarter in turin

== History ==
Granstudio is an international design studio founded in 2011 by Lowie Vermeersch, former design director of Pininfarina.

The studio operates within the broader mobility ecosystem, designing and developing mobility systems for a variety of international companies.

Over the years, the studio has received numerous international awards and recognitions for design excellence, including acknowledgements from Car Design News, participation in the Compasso d’Oro selection, and features in major industry exhibitions such as the Auto Show in Shanghai.

== Vehicles designed by Granstudio ==
- Chery TX concept (2012)
- Cowin i-CX concept (2014)
- Scuderia Cameron Glickenhaus SCG 003 (2015)
- Cowin X3 (2016)
- Chery Tiggo 7 (2016)
- Senova D70 Offspace Concept (2016)
- BAIC Senova Offspace concept (2016)
- Dallara Stradale (2017)
- Senova D70/Zhidao (2018)
- BAIC Suit concept (2018)
- Massey Ferguson NEXT concept (2019)
- Mobjects - Autonomous Urban Furniture (2019)
- Drako Motors Drako GTE (2019)
- Cowin Xuandu (2021)
- Lightyear 0 (2022)
- Drako Motors Drako Dragon (2022)
- Komma Vehicle (2023)
- Hitachi Landcros One (2025)
