= ERA HSS =

- Category: Single-seater
- Constructor: Tiger Racing

Technical specifications
- Chassis: Round tubular space frame chassis, GRP body with carbon fibre
- Suspension (front): Adjustable shock absorbers
- Suspension (rear): Trailing arm, adjustable shock absorbers
- Length: 3,500 mm (137.8 in)
- Axle track: 1,335 mm (52.6 in) front 1,350 mm (53.1 in) rear
- Wheelbase: 2,215 mm (87.2 in)
- Engine: Ford Zetec, 1,800 cc (109.8 cu in) or 2,000 cc (122.0 cu in), 16 valve DOHC straight-four Naturally aspirated Mid-engined
- Transmission: Hewland Mk.9 historic box 5-speed manual
- Weight: 460 kg (1,014 lb)
- Tyres: 205-50-15 front 225-50-15 rear

Competition history

The ERA HSS, or ERA SS, is a single-seater track car produced by Tiger Racing. Tiger Racing says that the styling of the ERA HSS is influenced by early Lotus and BRM vehicles.
