= Chery A1 =

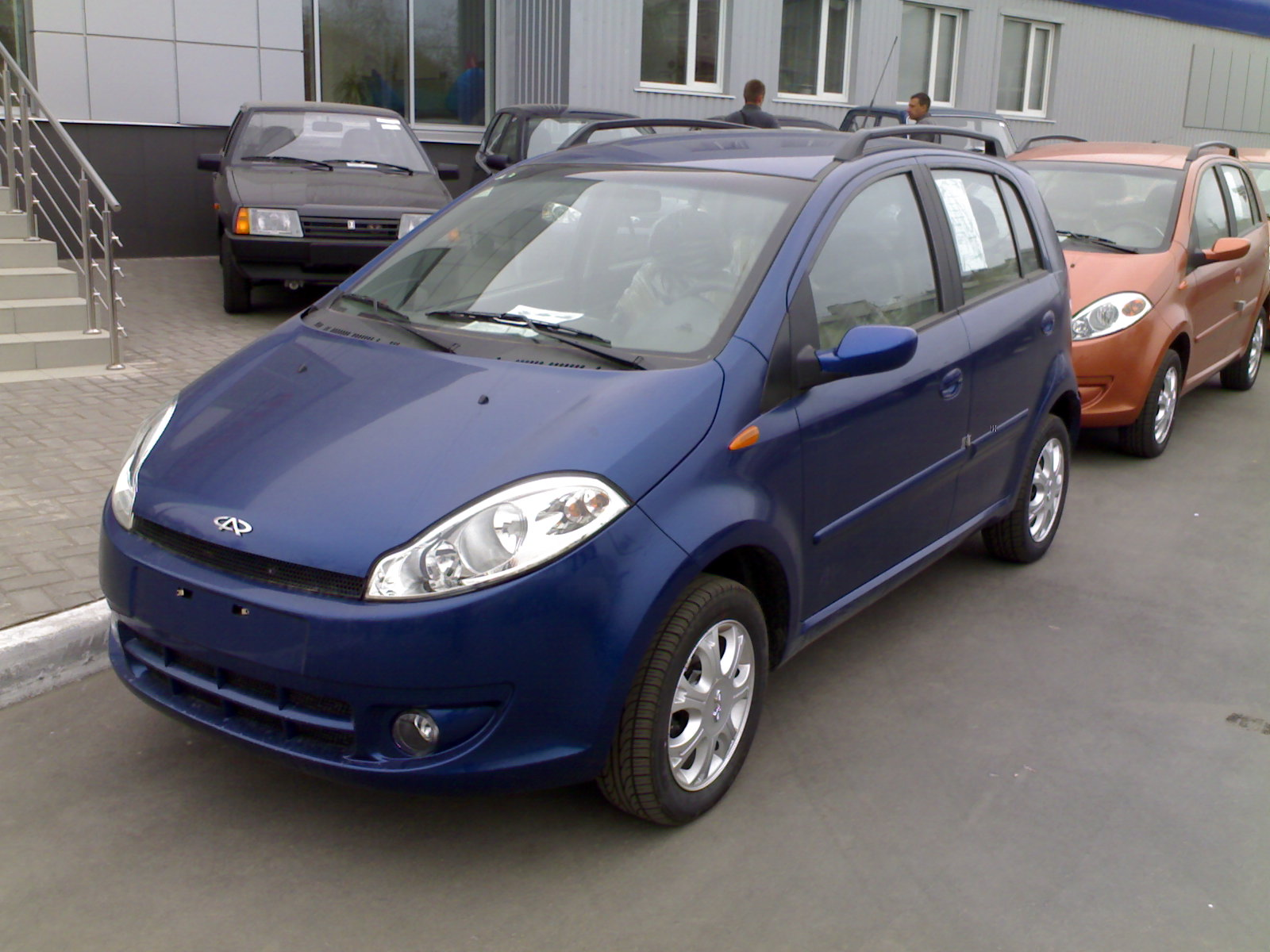

Overview
- Manufacturer: Chery
- Also called: DR2 (Italy); Chery A113; Chery Arauca (Venezuela); Chery Campus (Indonesia); Chery Ego (Serbia, Macedonia); Chery Kimo (Ukraine, Russia, Belarus, Turkey); Chery J1 (Australia, South Africa); Chery Face (Argentina, Brazil, Uruguay, Chile); Chery Fresh (Taiwan); Speranza A113 (Egypt)
- Production: 2007–2015
- Assembly: Wuhu, Anhui, China; Taichung, Taiwan; Macchia d'Isernia, Italy (DR Motor); Cairo, Egypt (Speranza); Aragua, Venezuela (ZGT); Barra de Carrasco, Uruguay (SOCMA)
- Designer: Bertone

Body and chassis
- Class: Supermini
- Body style: 5-door hatchback
- Layout: Front-engine, front-wheel-drive

Powertrain
- Engine: 1.0 L SQR317F I3; 1.3 L SQR473F I4
- Transmission: 5-speed manual 5-speed automatic

Dimensions
- Wheelbase: 2,390 mm (94.1 in)
- Length: 3,700 mm (145.7 in)
- Width: 1,580 mm (62.2 in)
- Height: 1,527 mm (60.1 in)
- Curb weight: 1,040 kg (2,293 lb)

The Chery A1 is a supermini car produced by the Chinese manufacturer Chery from 2007 to 2015.

== Engines and equipment ==
=== Engines ===
It was available with a 1.3-litre Acteco SQR473F engine, that has double overhead camshafts and 4 valves per cylinder, giving a peak power output 61 kW (82 hp) and peak torque of 114 N⋅m (84 lb⋅ft).

=== Trim levels ===
There are three trim levels available Standard, Comfortable and Luxury. Both Comfortable and Luxury include air conditioning, alloy wheels, ABS, EBD, CD/MP3 player, electric windows, power steering, trip computer, rear reverse radar and central locking. The Luxury model includes front three-point seat belts with emergency locking retractor (ELR).

== Marketing ==
=== Europe ===
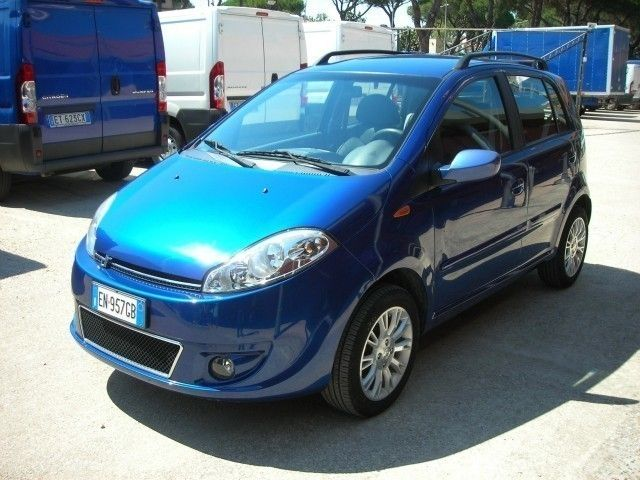
DR 2

In Italy, it was assembled by the DR Motor Company from semi-knocked down kits and marketed under its own brand, as the DR2. It was introduced at the 2009 Geneva Motor Show, as the third model marketed by the Italian company. It is available with 15-inch alloy rims and Euro V-compliant engine, and can be fitted with leather upholstery and an LPG kit.

In Europe, it is also marketed in Russia, Ukraine, Serbia, Macedonia and Turkey.

=== Australia ===
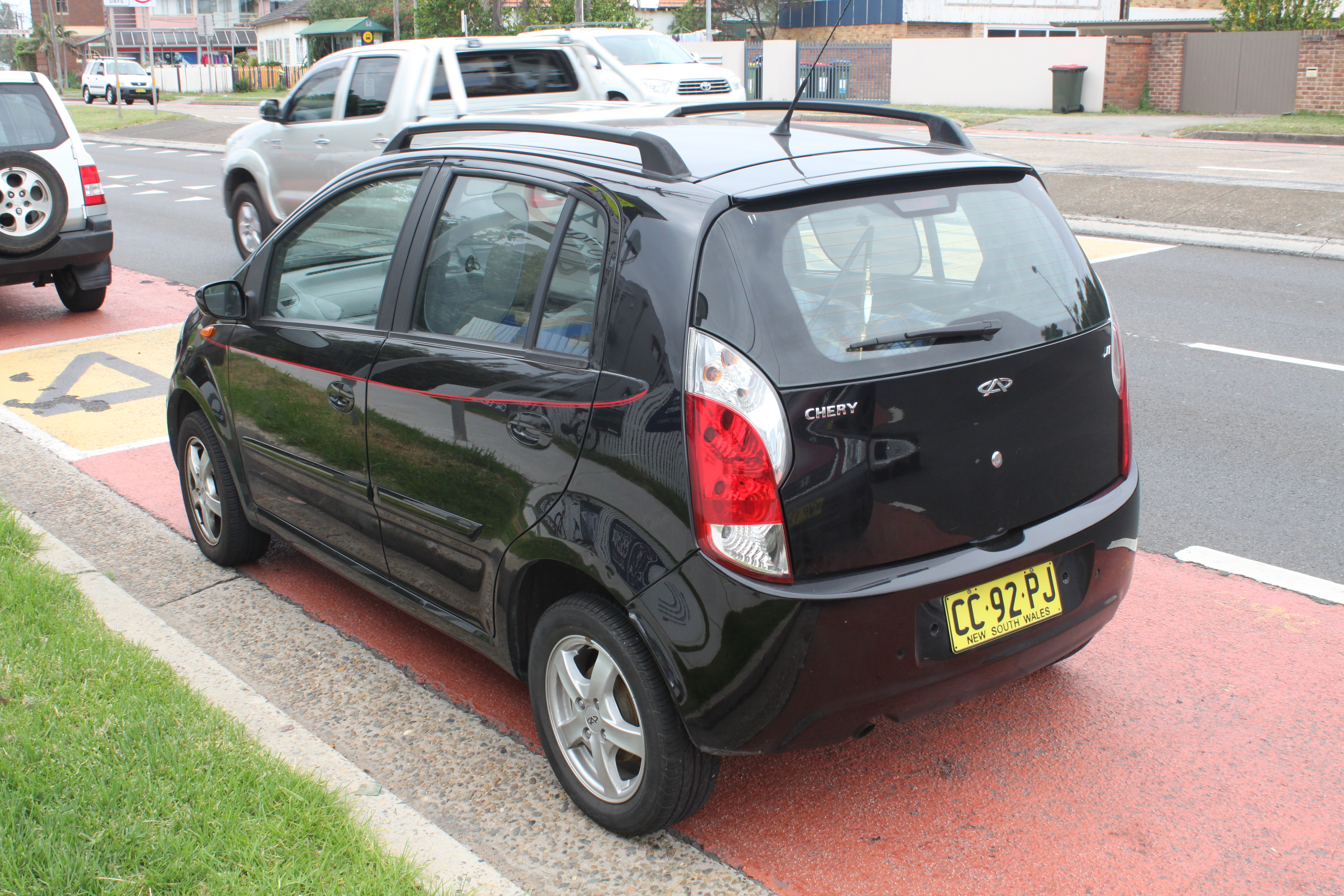
2011 Chery J1 (S2X) hatchback rear

In Australia, sales commenced in 2011 (in all states except Victoria), under the name of J1 (as Audi sells the A1 model there). The initial release price was $11,990 AUD; however, a $1,000 cashback offer was made available. This made it one of the cheapest new cars available in Australia, along with the Proton S16, Suzuki Alto and Geely MK (sold in Western Australia only).

It was equipped with more features for the Australian market, including 14-inch alloy wheels, front fog lamps, two front airbags, a six-speaker CD player, air-conditioning, electric windows and side mirrors and a rear windscreen wiper along with a strengthened body and grille. Optional features were floor mats, reversing sensors, Bluetooth connectivity and headlight covers.

== Safety ==
In Australia safety features such as ABS and EBD were included; however, electronic stability control was unavailable. Because of this, the vehicle was never sold in the state of Victoria, which requires all new vehicles sold after 1 January 2011 to come with ESC. This requirement became Australia-wide as from 1 November 2013, effectively banning the car along with some others. Also, it does not have side airbags. With these shortfalls, the Chery J1 scored a three star result in Australian ANCAP tests, making it one of the equal least-safe vehicles sold in the country. Indeed, ANCAP states that it "does not recommend purchasing vehicles with less than 4 stars". A defect in the seat frame necessitated a safety recall in August 2011.

ANCAP test results Chery J1 (2011)
Test	Score
Overall	3 /5 stars
Frontal offset	5.23/16
Side impact	11.73/16
Pole	Not Assessed
Seat belt reminders	0/3
Whiplash protection	Not Assessed
Pedestrian protection	Poor
Electronic stability control	Not Available
