= Tiger Racing =

Automobiles manufacturer

Tiger Racing Ltd
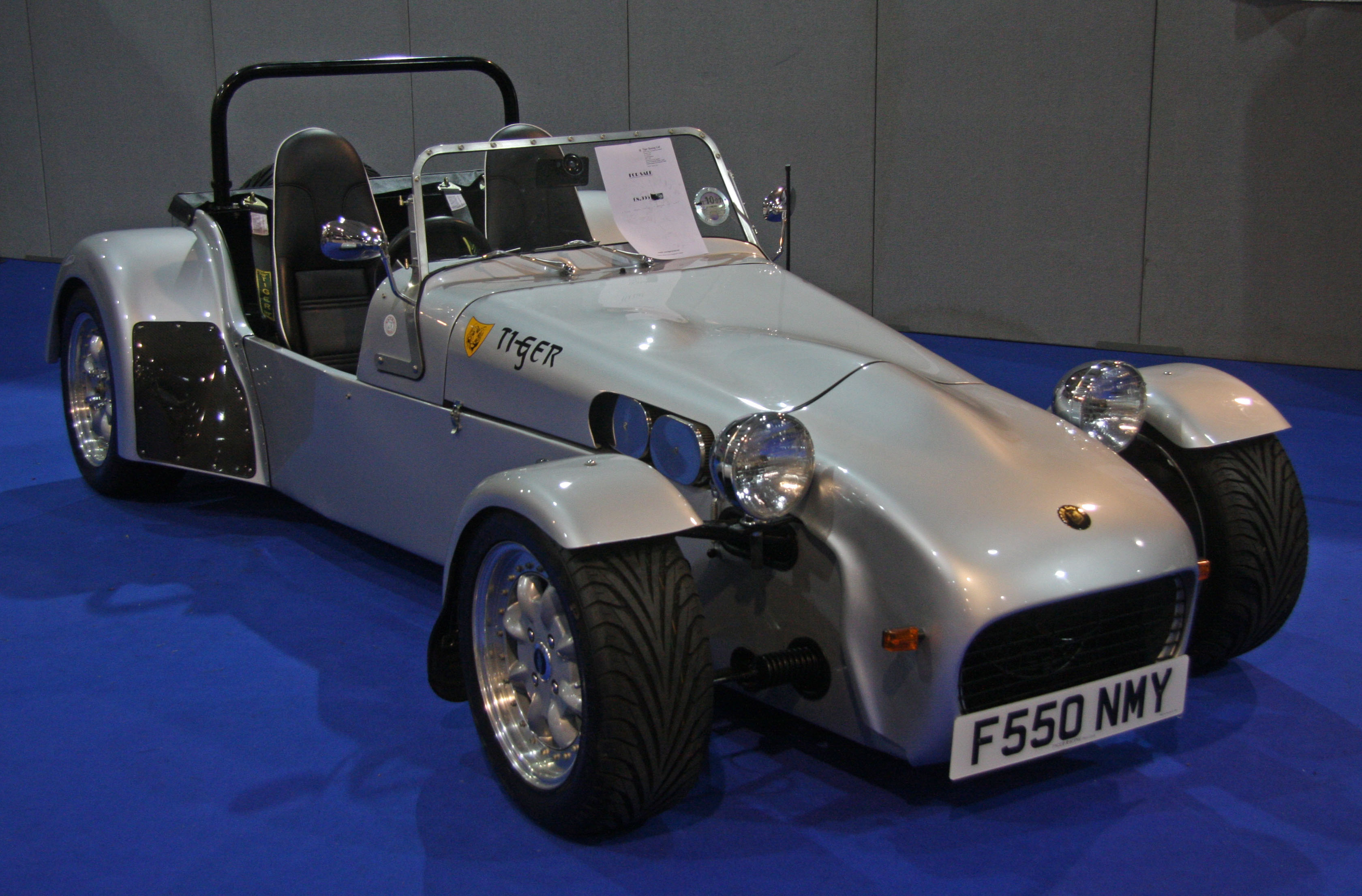
- Company type: Subsidiary
- Industry: Automotive
- Founded: 1989; 36 years ago
- Founder: Jim Dudley
- Headquarters: Wisbech, England
- Area served: Worldwide
- Products: Automobiles
- Owner: DR Automobiles
- Parent: DR Automobiles
- Website: www.tigerracing.com

Tiger Racing Ltd is an English kit car manufacturer, formed in 1989 by Jim Dudley.

In 1998 they moved to new premises in Peterborough, Cambridgeshire.

Their facilities include a moving floor, two engineering shops, a paint department, a sales and show area, MOT Station, trimming shop and a filled parts department. Tiger also has worldwide agents for shipping their sports cars globally.

Their Z100 model, which is no longer in production, held a 0–60 mph (0.00–96.56 km/h) record at 2.8 seconds.

The company was sold in 2022 to the Italian DR Automobiles.

== Models ==
ERA tm

- ERA 30 tm
- ERA HSStm
- Tiger Aviator tm
- Tiger Avon
- Tiger B6
- Tiger R6
- Tiger RS6
- Tiger Z100
- Tiger Cat E1/Supercat/XL

Previous models include:

- Super Six tm
- Tiger Hawke
- Tiger Cub
- Tiger "D" type
- Tiger storm
- Tiger 250lm

== Motorsport ==
Tiger Racing have their own motorsport series in which owners and drivers race. They compete with other owners at Silverstone, Brands Hatch, Mallory Park, Cadwell Park, Donington Park, Rockingham, Snetterton, Castle Combe and Lydden Hill. They also run a hire drive service of works cars for people to experience racing. They often have racing battles with Caterham and Westfield. They sometimes race in the Intermarque run by the South Eastern Centre of the British Automobile Racing Club.

== See also ==
- DR Automobiles
