= Chery Kimo =

Two cars have been sold by Chery as the Chery Kimo in certain countries:

- Chery A1, a supermini manufactured from 2007 to 2015
- Chery QQ3, a city car manufactured beginning in 2012
