= DR Automobiles =

Italian automobile company

DR Automobiles S.r.l.
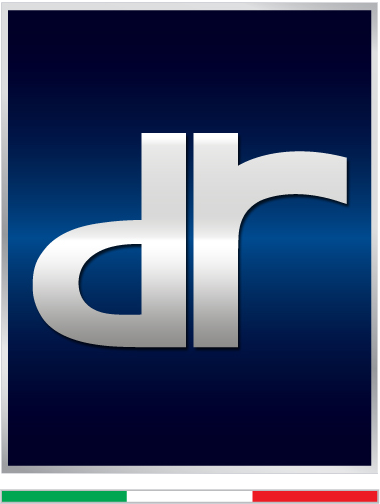
- Type: Private
- Industry: Automotive
- Founded: 1985; 41 years ago
- Founder: Massimo Di Risio
- Headquarters: Macchia d'Isernia, Italy
- Area served: Italy
- Key people: Massimo Di Risio (Chairman)
- Products: Automobiles
- Brands: DR; EVO; Sportequipe; ICH-X; Tiger; Birba; Katay; Stilnovo
- Revenue: ▲€1.3 billion (2025) ▲€700 million (2023)
- Website: www.drautomobilesgroupe.com

DR Automobiles Groupe is an Italian automobile company established in 2006. It mainly sells rebadged vehicles from Chinese automakers BAIC Group, Chery Automobile, Dongfeng Motor Corporation, Changan Automobile (since end of 2025) and JAC Motors.

It produces vehicles under 8 brands: DR, EVO, Sportequipe, ICH-X, Tiger, Birba, Katay, and Stilnovo.

== History ==
The company was founded by Massimo Di Risio in 1985. In 2006 the DR brand was launched. As of 2008, the company had offices in Rome, Campobasso and Pescara.

Since November 2007, DR partners with Chery to assemble and distribute Chery vehicles in Italy under the DR brand. Some Chery vehicles are assembled at a facility in Macchia d'Isernia to be sold as DR vehicles. The original Chery Tiggo was marketed as the DR 5, while the Riich M1 became the DR 1.

The company had a network of 20 dealers in Italy at the end of 2018.

In 2020, DR launched their first subbrand called EVO, which at the same year, the company started rebranding vehicles from BAIC Group.

In 2022, DR added a more "premium" brand called Sportequipe, which are also rebranded Chery vehicles. It also introduced the ICKX brand (later renamed to ICH-X due to a legal dispute with former motorsport driver Jacky Ickx), initially with one model in offer, the ICH-X K2, based on the first-generation Beijing BJ40; at the same year, the company acquired the OSCA brand from the Maserati family.

In February 2023, DR started selling its first electric vehicle, the DR 1.0, a rebranded Chery eQ1.

Following the acquisition of Tiger Racing in 2023, in 2024 DR introduced the Tiger sub-brand, which at the same year, the company started rebranding vehicles from Dongfeng Motor Corporation.

In 2025, DR Automobiles presented at the Turin Auto Show, a new brand that is going to be part of DR Motor Company, which is the brand Stilnovo.

== Brands ==
=== Own brands ===
The active own brand portfolio of DR Automobiles as of 2026 is shown below.

Brand	Origin	Established
DR	Italy	2006
EVO	Italy	2020
Sportequipe	Italy	2022
Birba	Italy	2025
Katay	Italy	2025
Stilnovo	Italy	2026

=== Own brands retired ===
Brand	Origin	Established	Retired
ICKX†/ICH-X	Italy	2022	2024

† Brand subject to legal dispute with Jacky Ickx. Renamed ICH-X.

=== Historic English brands ===
The active acquired brand portfolio of DR Automobiles as of 2026 is shown below.

Brand	Origin	Established
Tiger	United Kingdom	1989

=== Historic Italian brands ===
Brand	Origin	Established
Itala	Italy	1904
OSCA	Italy	1947

== Products ==
=== Current models ===
==== DR ====
- DR 3 / 3.0 (2016–present, based on the Chery Tiggo 3x)
- DR 5 / 5.0(2020–present, based on the Chery Tiggo 5x)
- DR 5 Stilnovo (2026–present, based on the Changan CS35 Plus)
- DR 6 / 6.0(2022–present, based on the second-generation Chery Tiggo 7)
- DR 8 / 7.0(2023–present, based on the first generation Chery Tiggo 8)
- DR PK8 (2023–present, based on the JAC Shuailing T8)
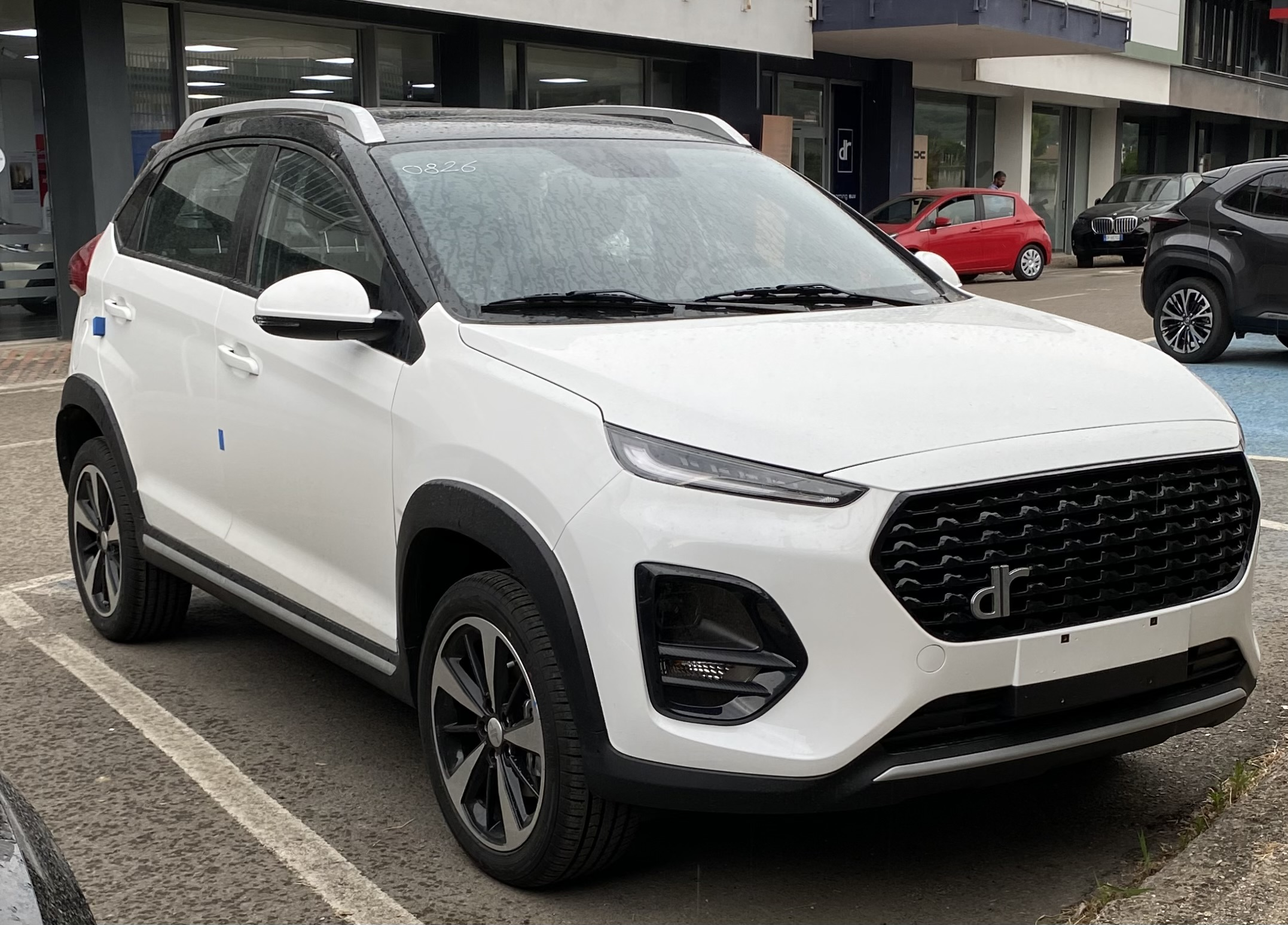
DR 3.0

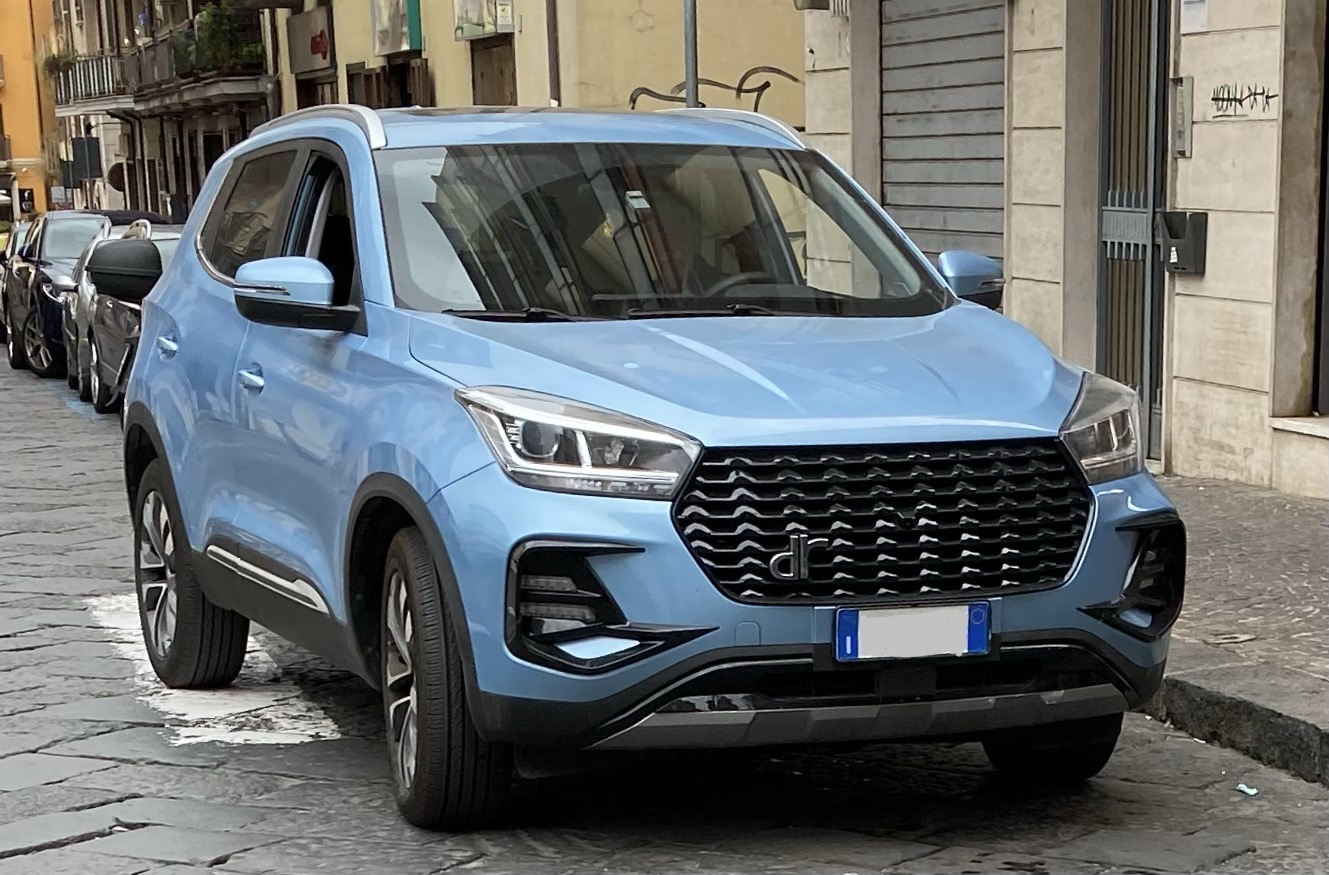
DR 5.0

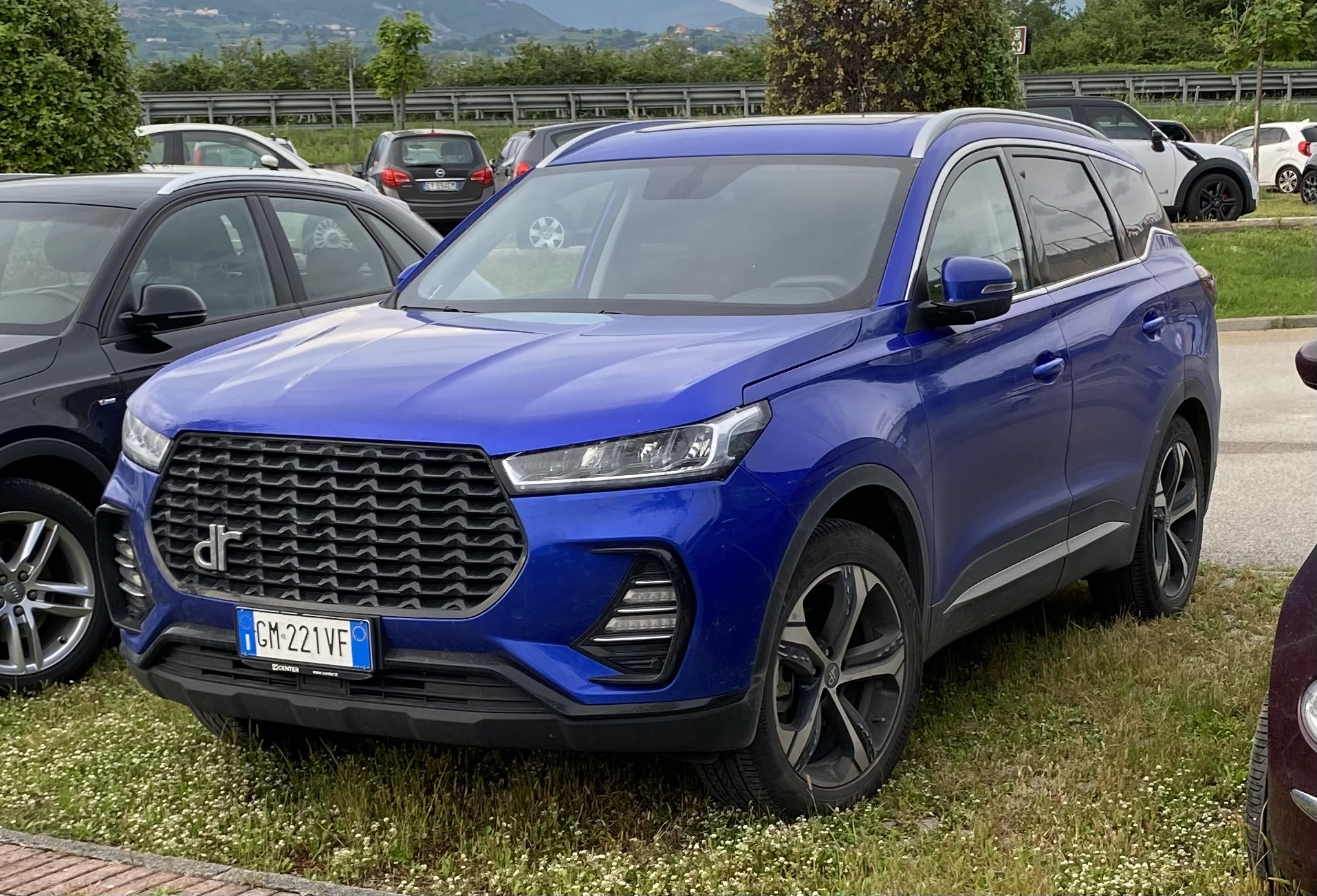
DR 6.0

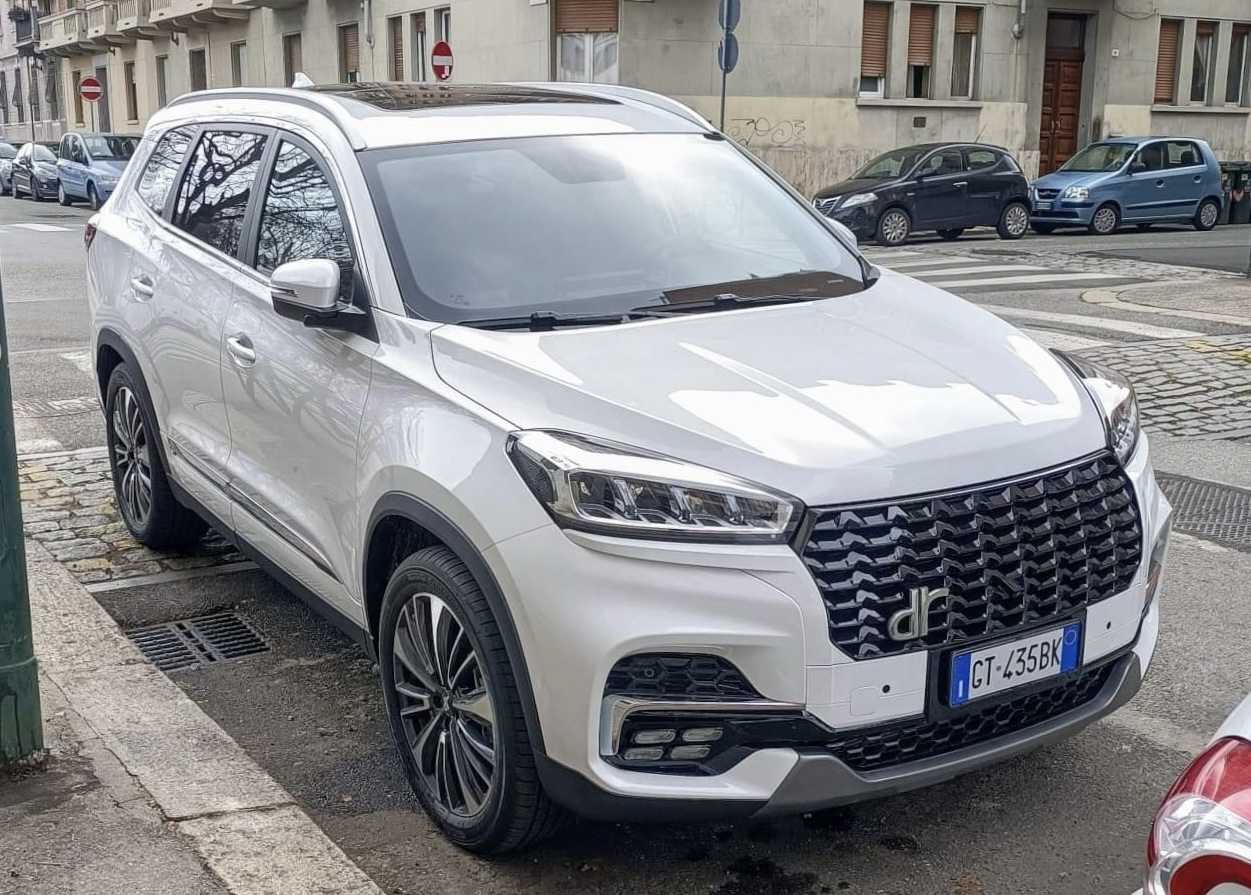
DR 7.0

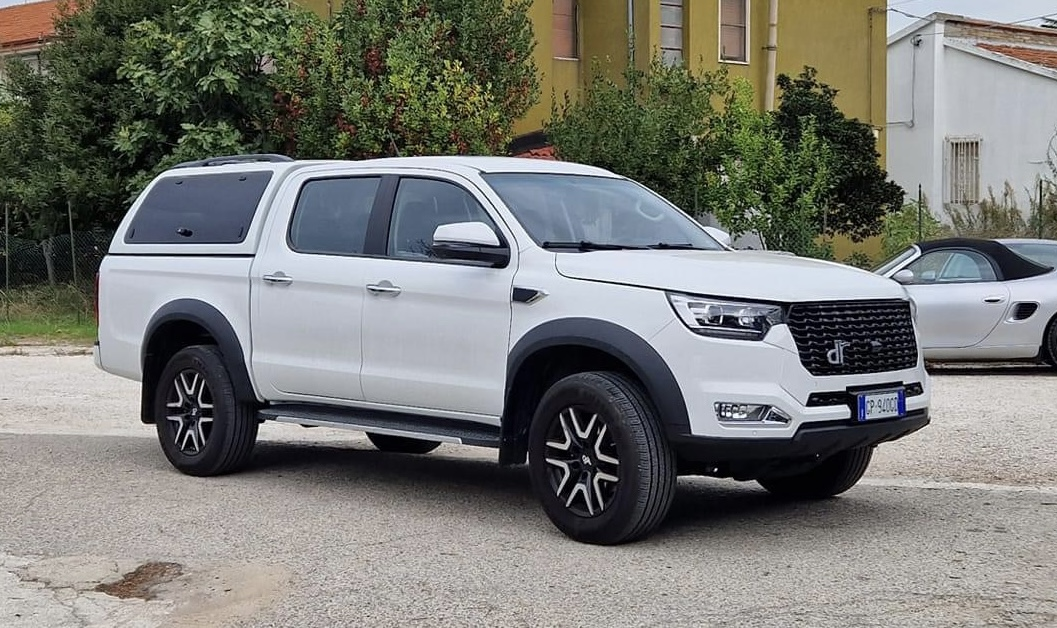
DR PK8

==== EVO ====
- EVO 3 (2020–present, based on the JAC Refine S2)
- EVO 4 (2020–present, based on the JAC Refine S3)
- EVO Cuatro (2025–present, Spanish model based on the Kaiyi Showjet)
- EVO 5 (2020–present, based on the Chery Tiggo 3 between 2020 and 2022, and later the second-generation Beijing X3 since 2023)
- EVO 6 (2020–present, based on the Chery Tiggo 5 between 2020 and 2021, and later the second-generation Forthing T5 EVO since 2024)
- EVO 7 (2023–present, based on the Sehol X8)
- EVO 7 Kairos (2025–present, based on the JAC QX)
- EVO 8 (2024–present, based on the Kaiyi Kunlun)
- EVO Cross 4 (2022–present, based on the JAC Shuailing T8)
- EVO Spazio (2024–present, based on the Forthing Yacht)
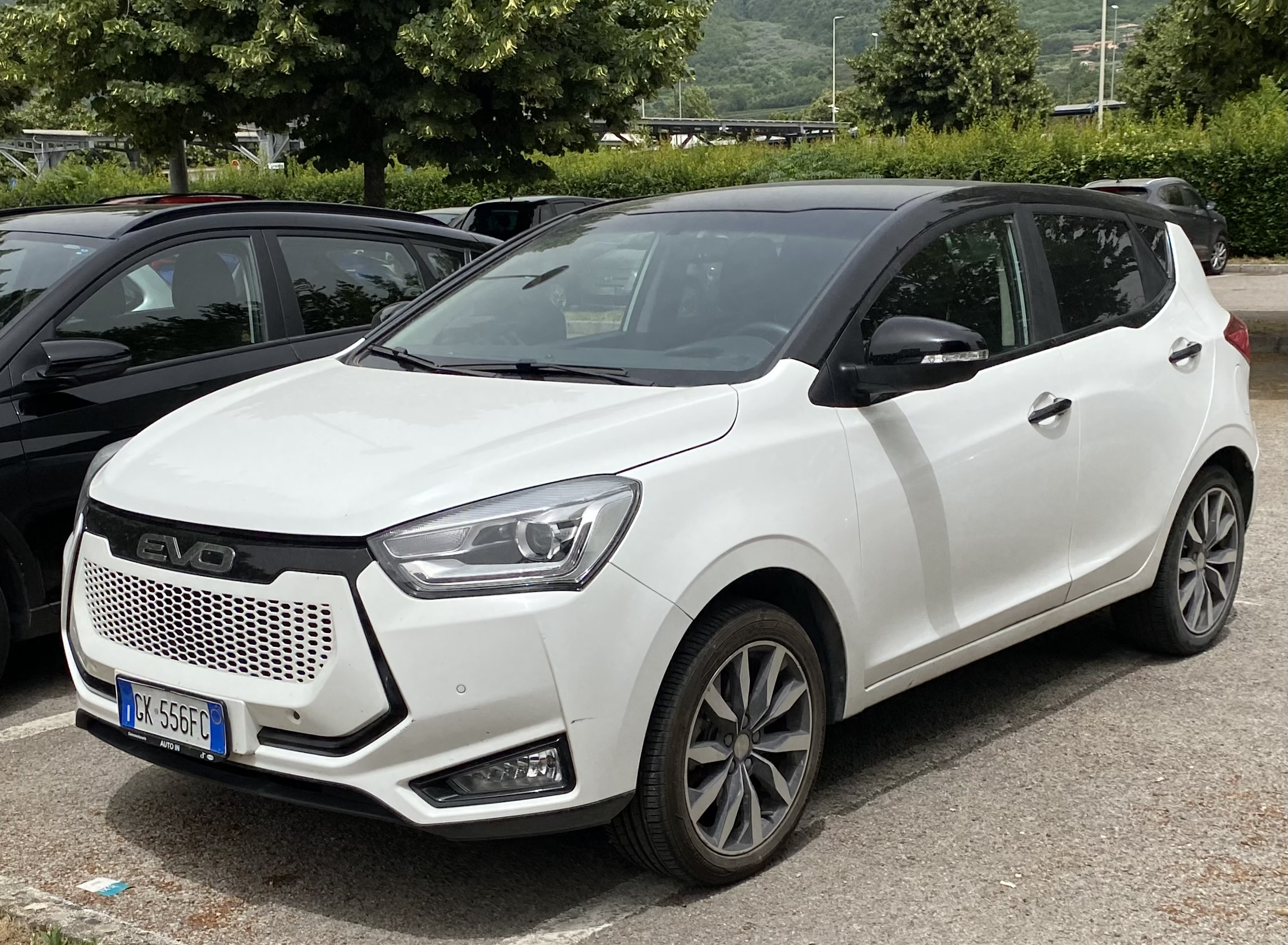
EVO 3

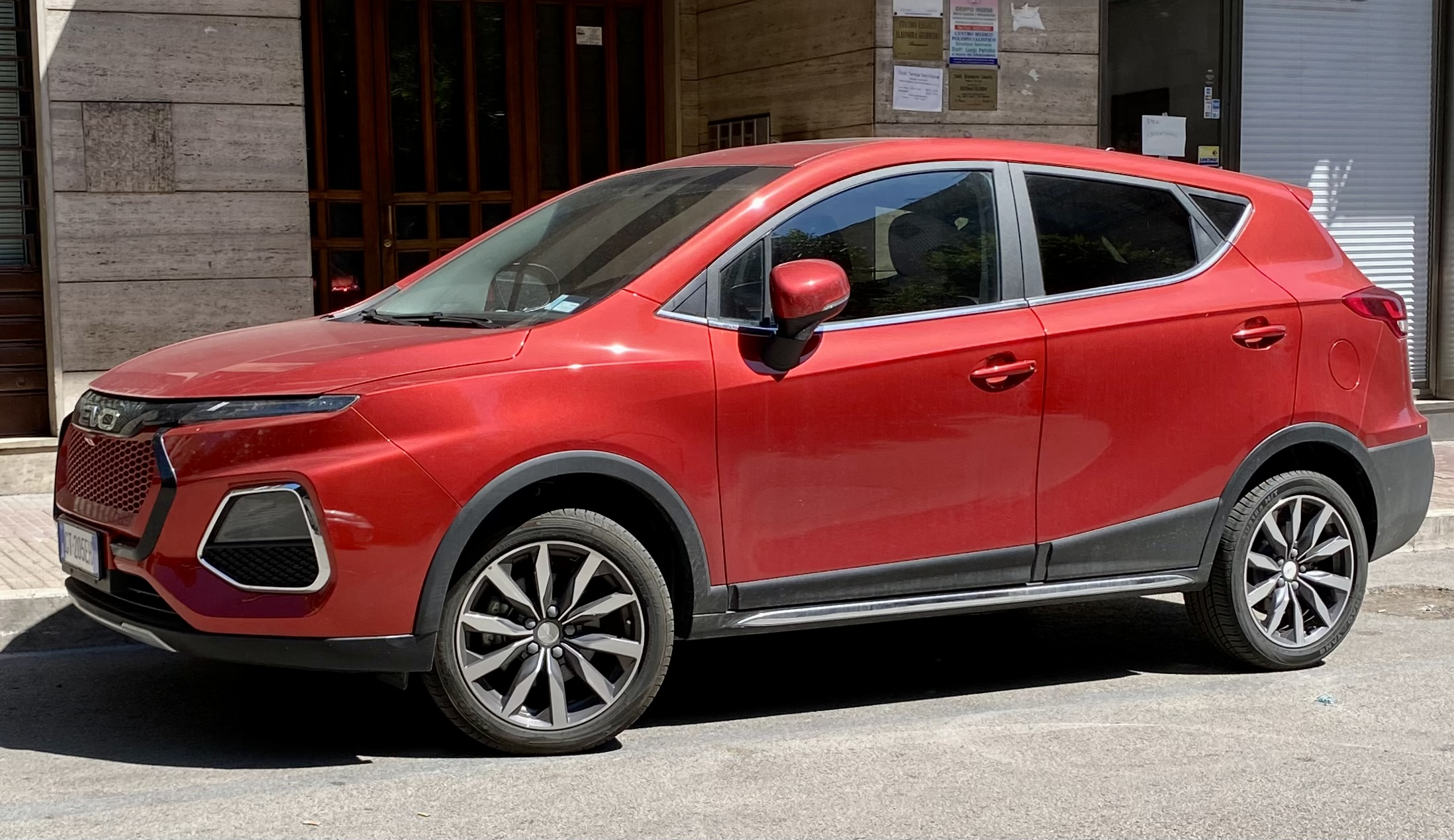
EVO 4

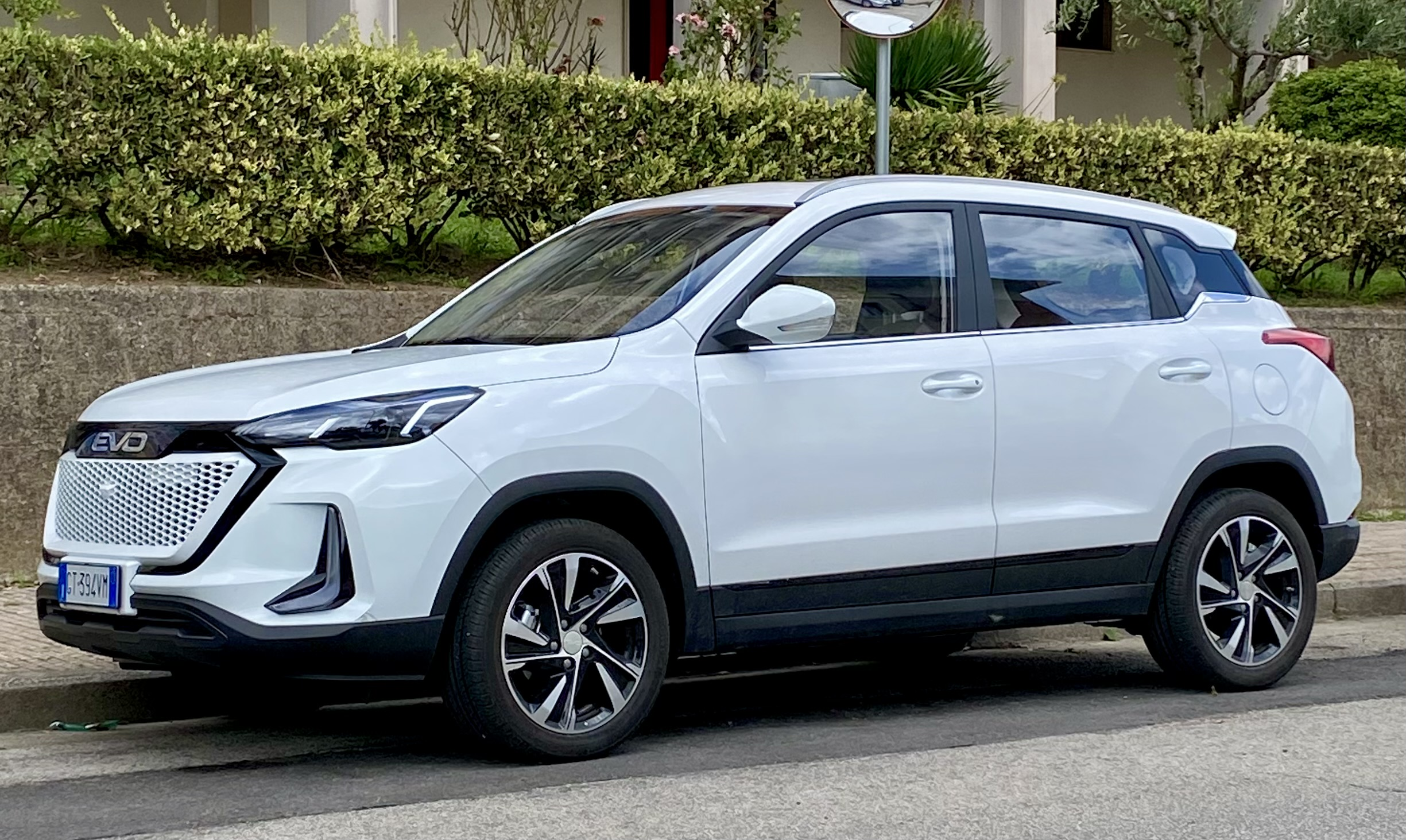
EVO 5 (Second-generation)

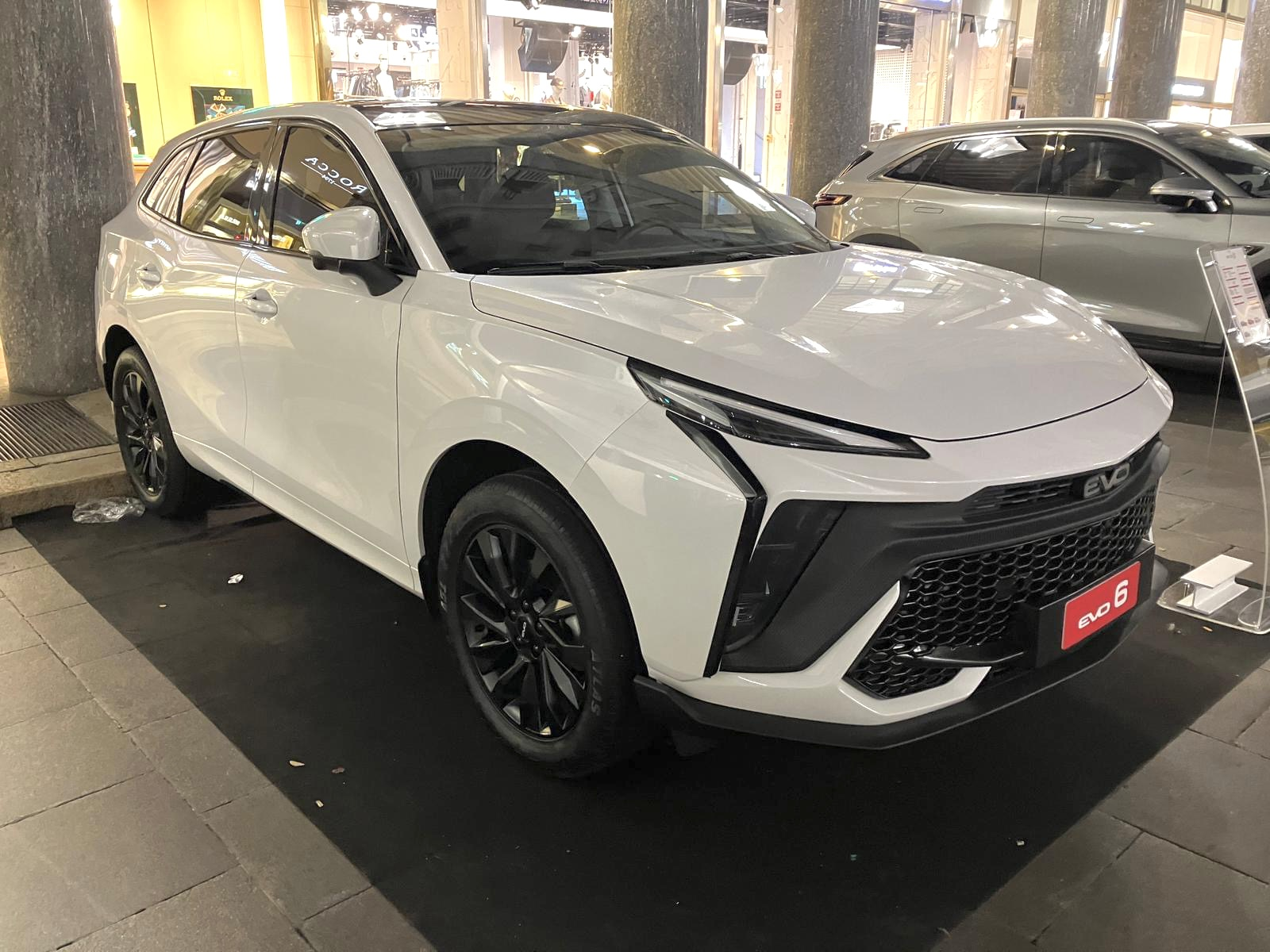
EVO 6 (Second-generation)

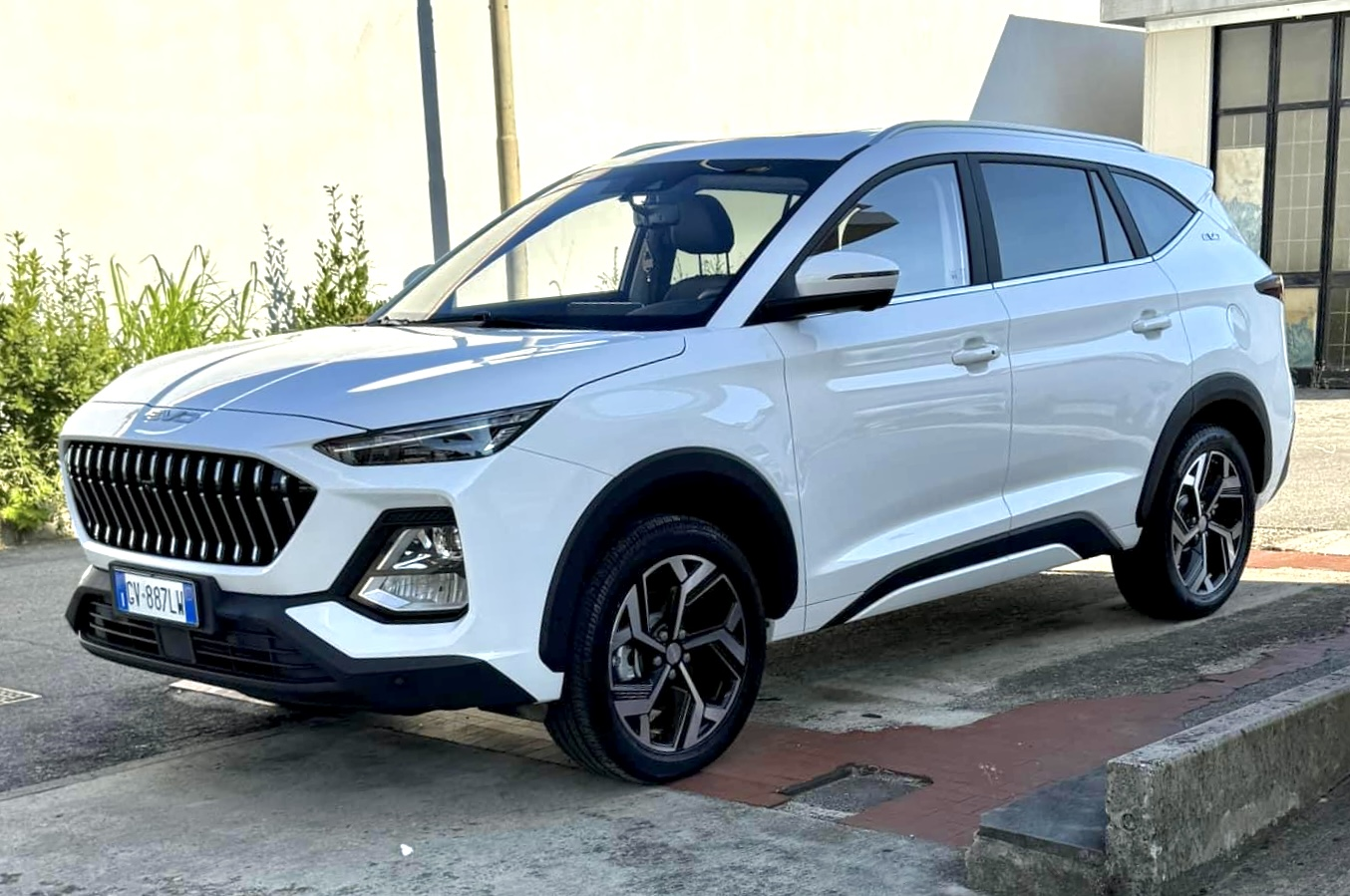
EVO 7

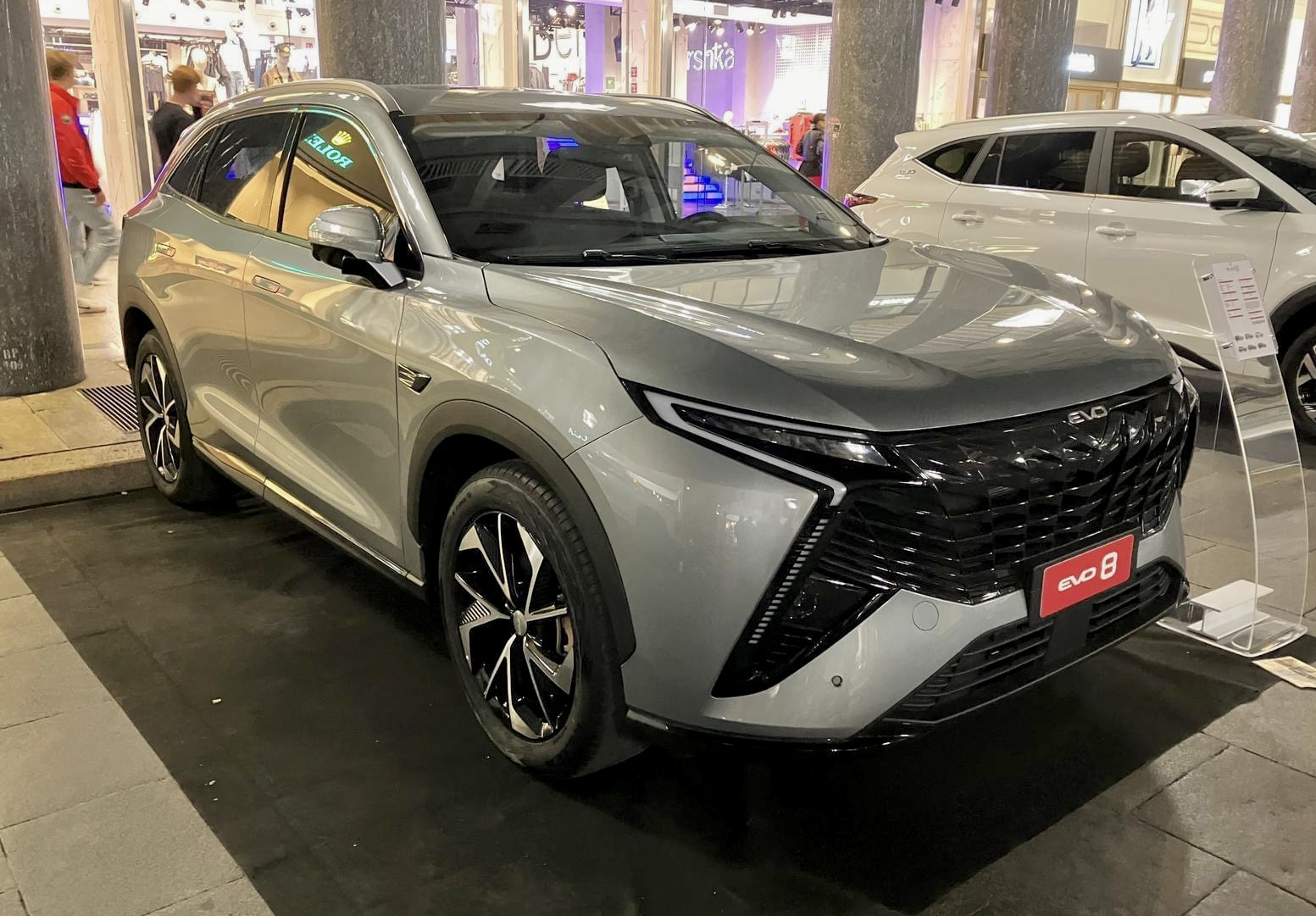
EVO 8

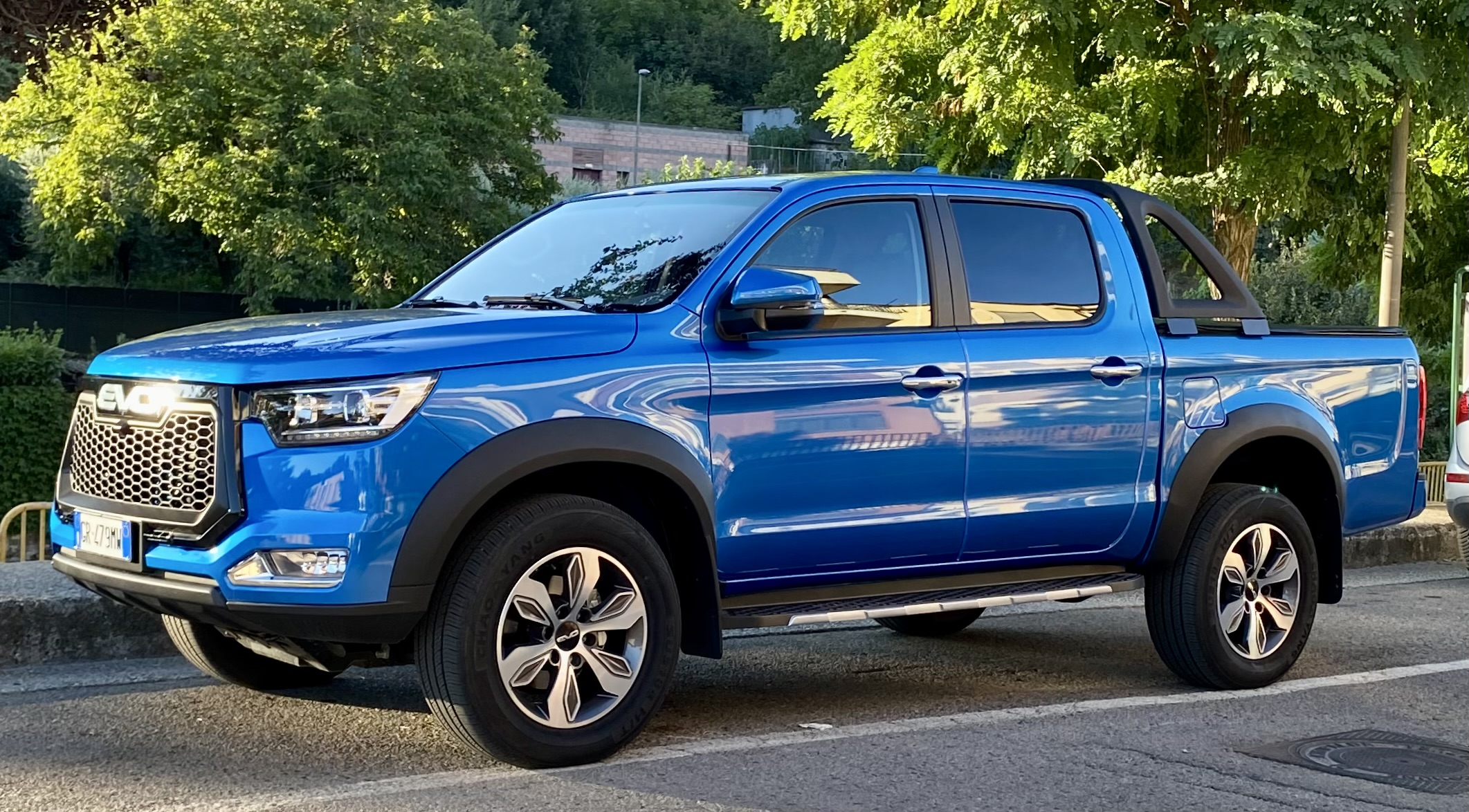
EVO Cross 4

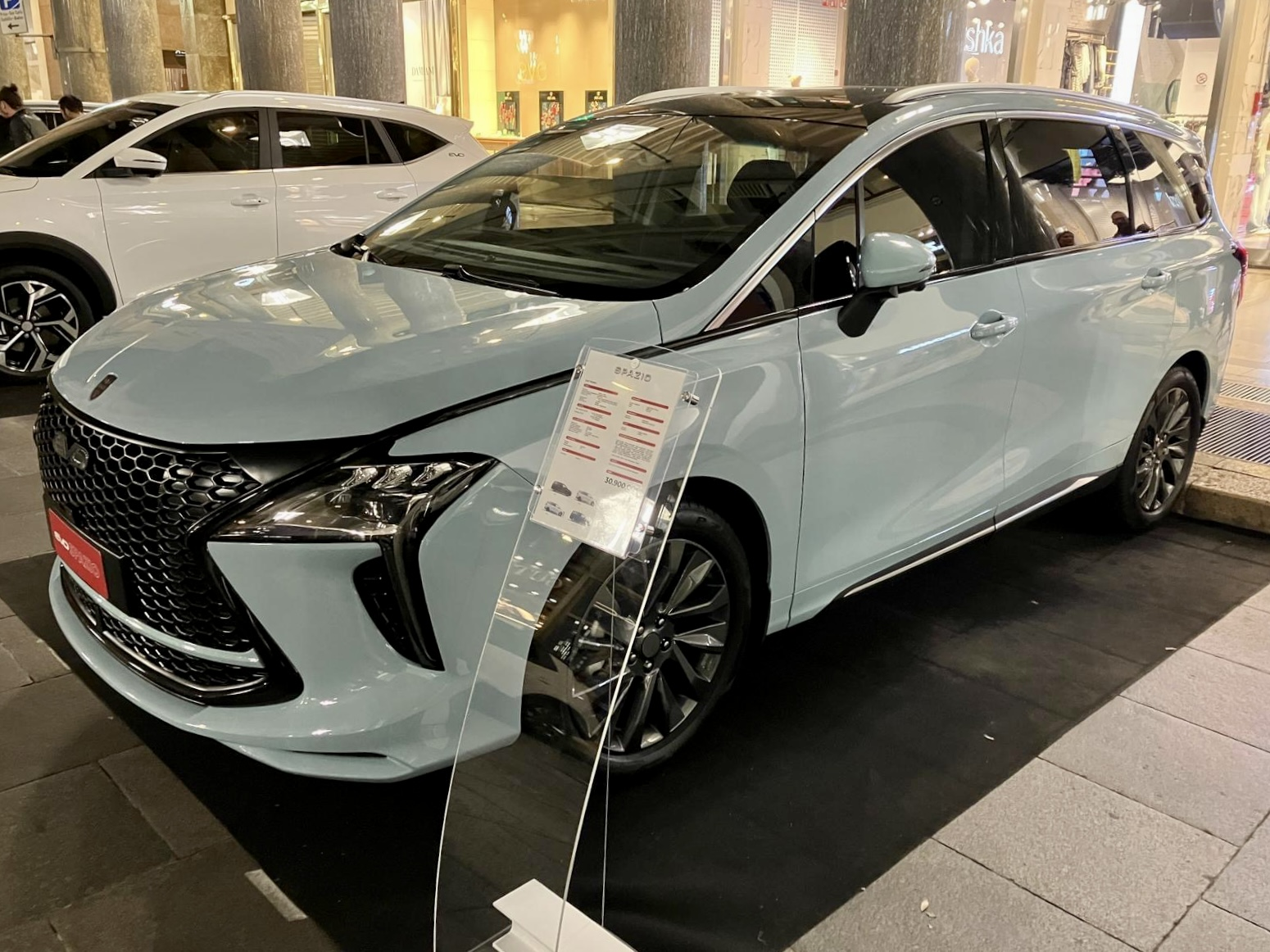
EVO Spazio

==== ICH-X ====
Formerly known as ICKX between 2022 and 2024.

- ICH-X K2 (2023–present, based on the first-generation Beijing BJ40)
- ICH-X K3 (2024–present, based on the Jetour T2)
- ICH-X K4 (2024–present, based on the JAC Hunter)
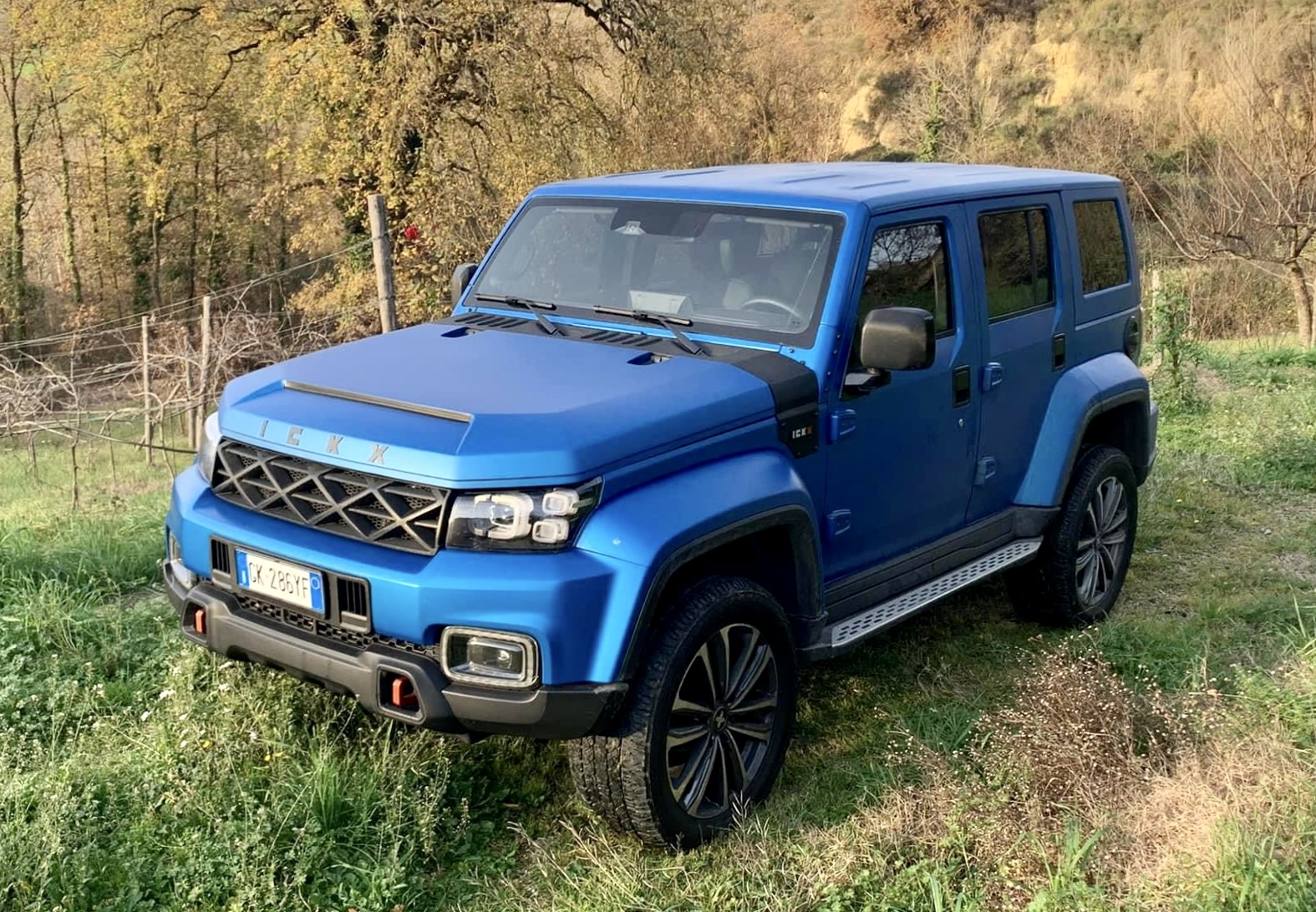
ICH-X K2

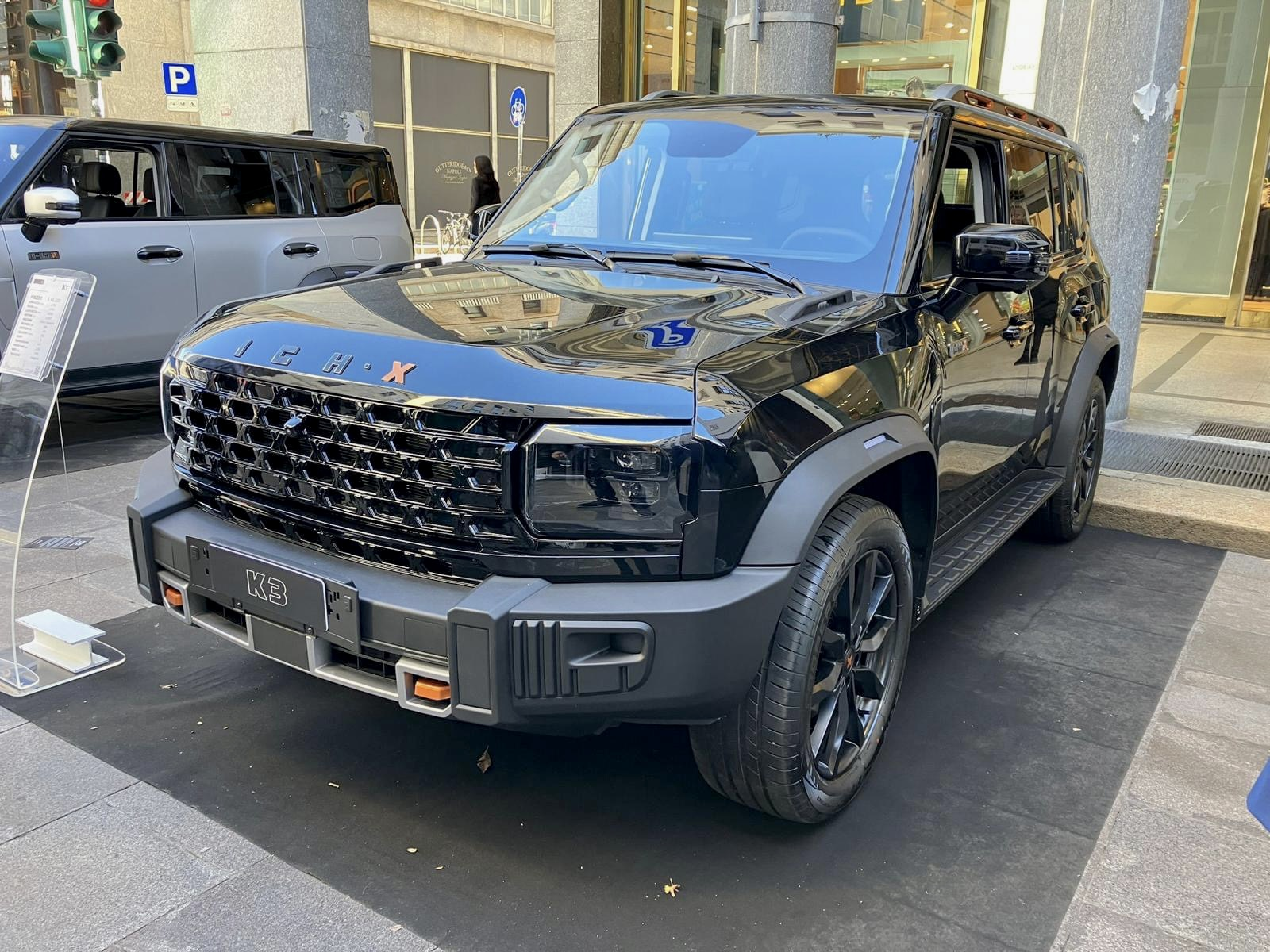
ICH-X K3

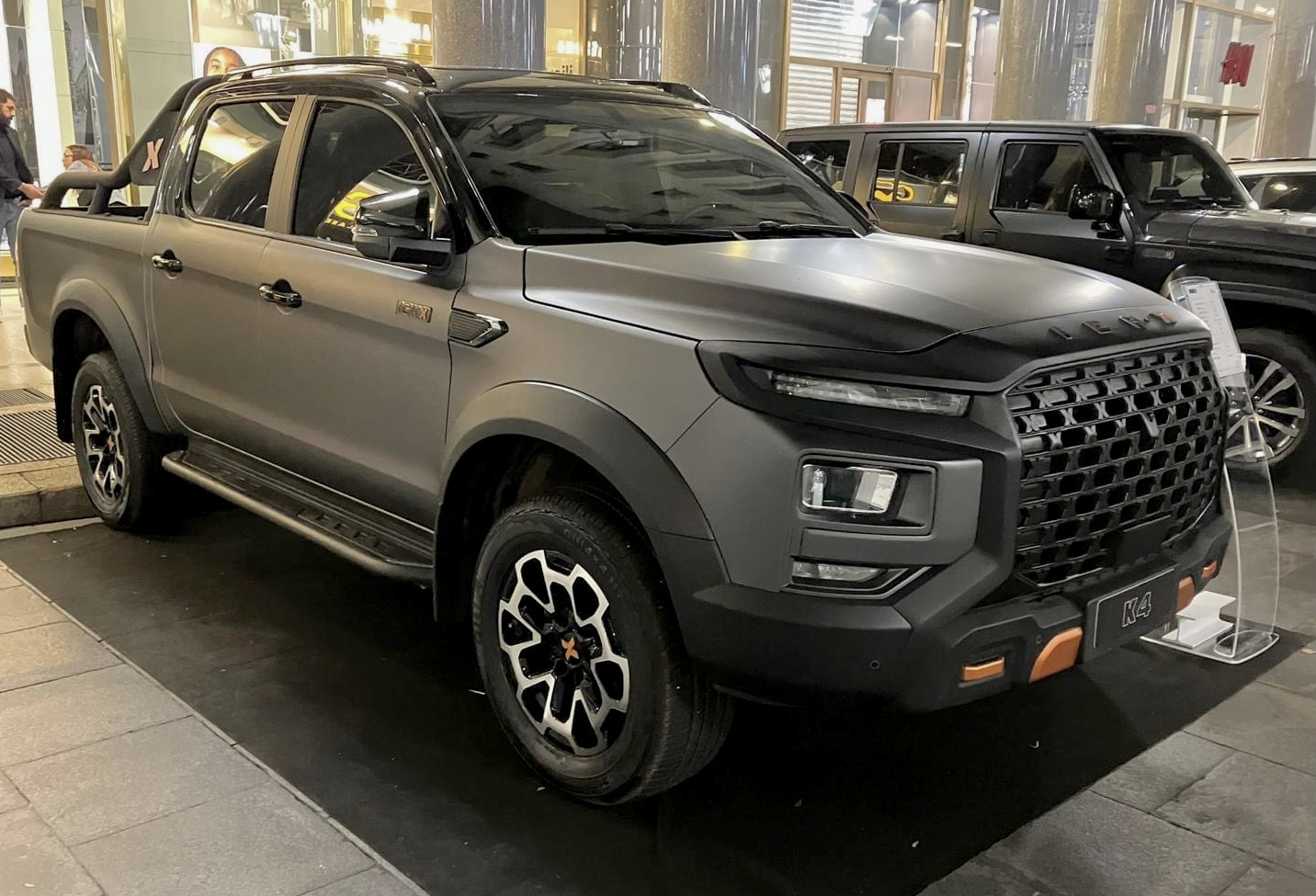
ICH-X K4

==== Sportequipe ====
- Sportequipe 6 GT (2024–present, based on the Jetour Dashing)
- Sportequipe 7 GTW (2024–present, based on the Jetour X70)
- Sportequipe 8 GT (2025–present, based on the Kaiyi Kunlun)
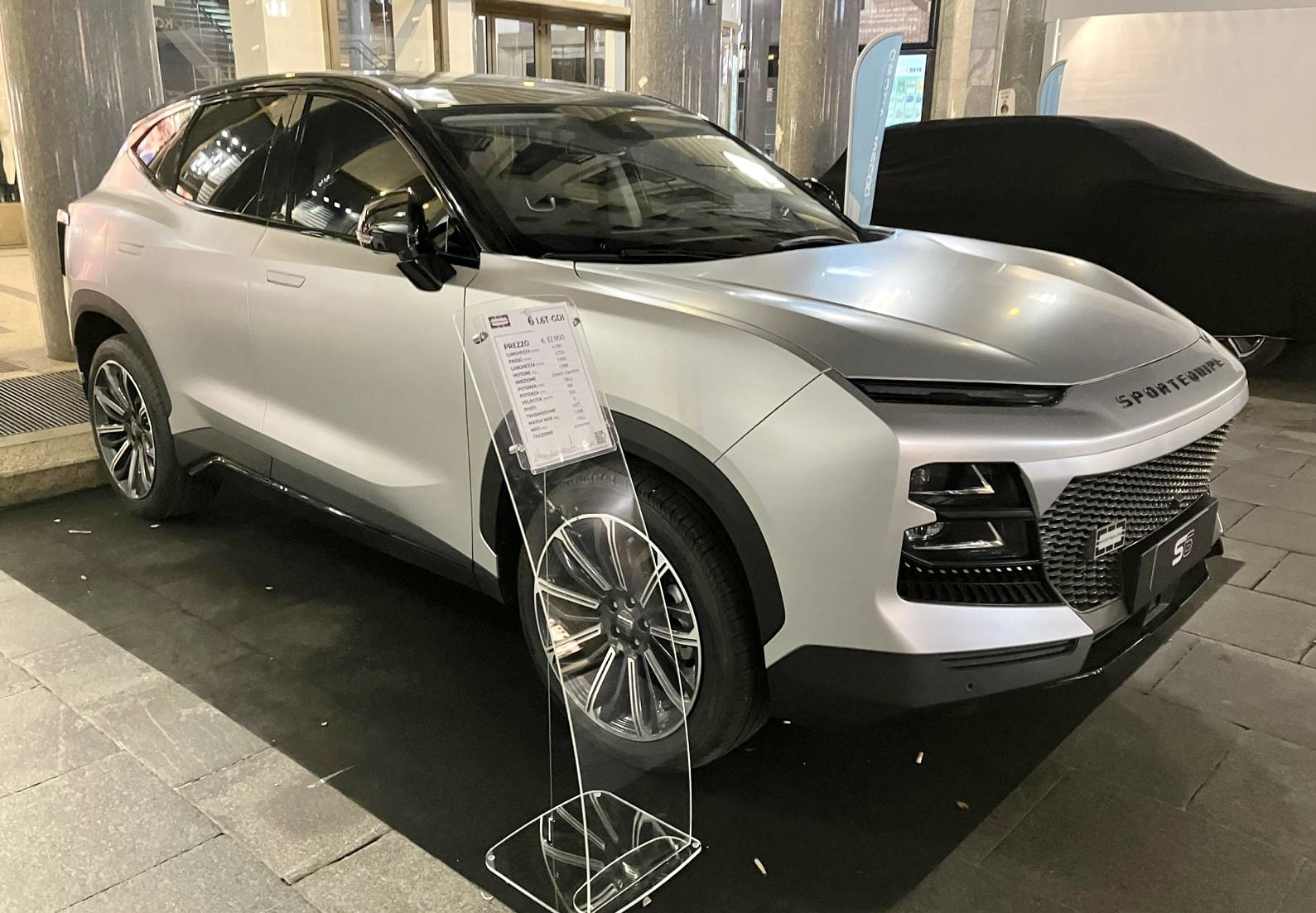
Sportequipe 6 GT

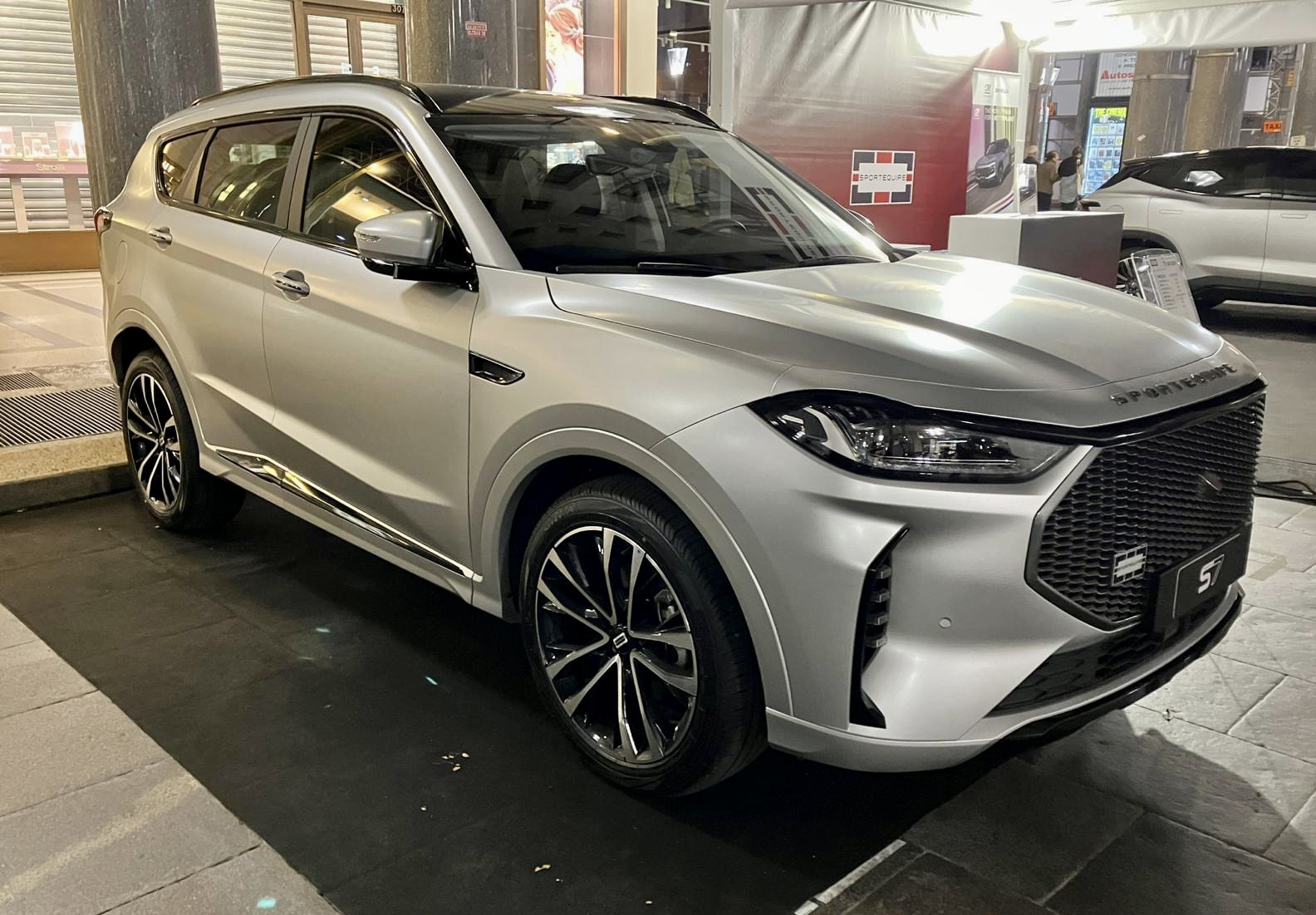
Sportequipe 7 GTW

==== Tiger ====
- Tiger Six (2024–present, based on the Beijing Mofang)
- Tiger Seven (2024–present, based on the Sehol QX)
- Tiger Eight (2024–present, based on the Beijing X7)
- Tiger Nine (2025–present, based on the Forthing Xinghai V9)

==== Birba ====
- Birba (2025–present, based on the Chery QQ Ice Cream), which is their first heavy quadricycle.
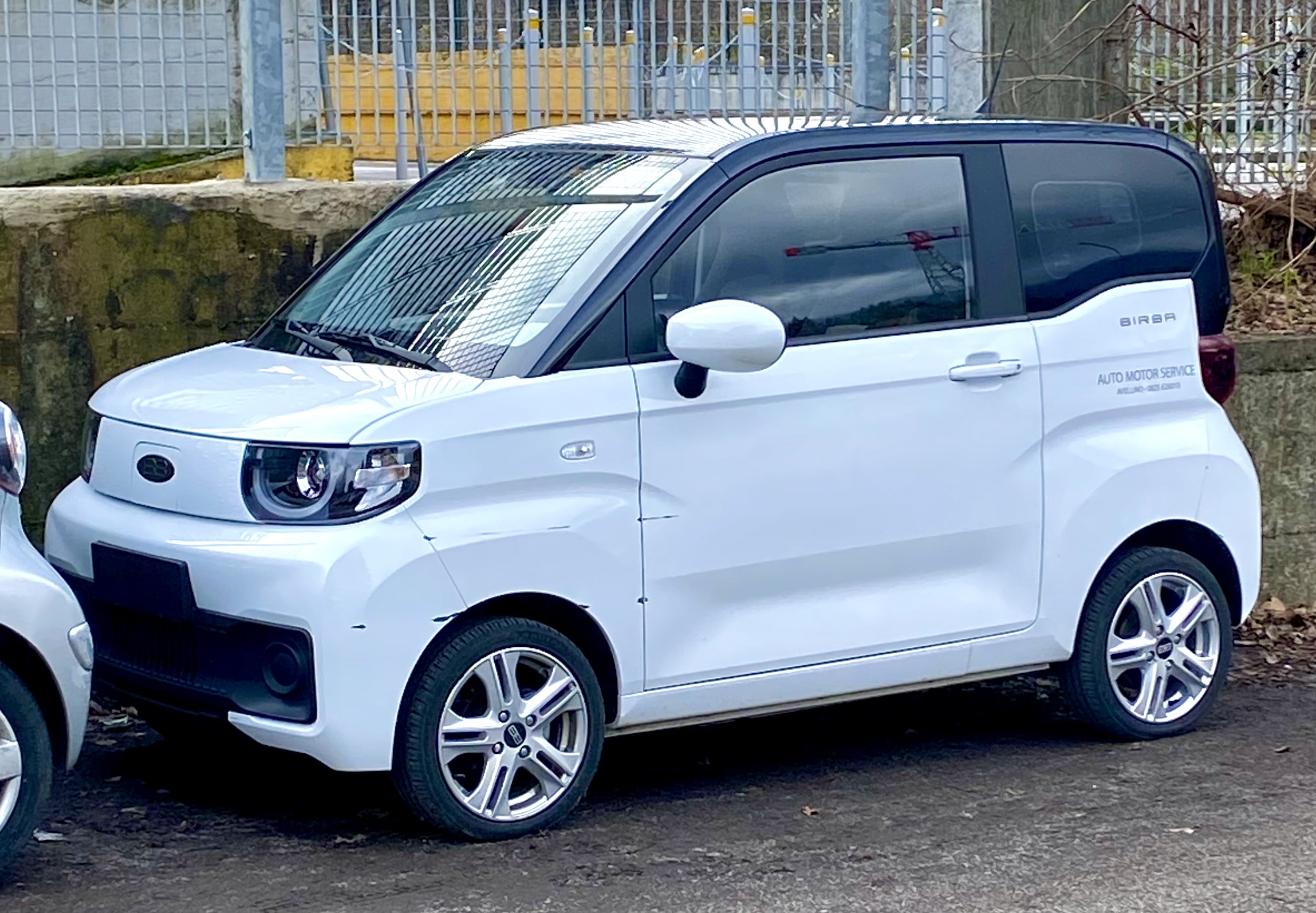
Birba

==== Katay ====
- Katay 35C (2025–present, based on the Karry X6)
- Katay 24C (2025–present, based on the Foton Xiangling Q)
- Katay 16 (2025–present, based on the Linxys G050p)

==== Stilnovo ====
- Stilnovo 5 (2026–present, based on the Changan CS35 Plus)
- Stilnovo 6 (2026–present, based on the Changan CS55 Plus)

==== Itala ====
- Itala 35 (2026 protoype, based on the GAC Emzoom)

==== OSCA ====
- OSCA MT6 (2026 prototype, based on the Changan UNI-T)

=== Former models ===
==== DR ====
- DR 1 (2009–2014, based on the Riich M1)
- DR 1.0 (2023–2026, based on the Chery eQ1)
- DR 2 (2010–2014, based on the Chery A1)
- DR 4 (2016–2020, based on the JAC Refine S3)
- DR 5 (2007–2020, based on the Chery Tiggo 3)
- DR 6 (2016–2020, based on the Chery Tiggo 5)
- DR 4.0 (2022–2024, based on the Chery Tiggo 5x, continuation of the pre-facelift DR 5.0)
- DR CityCross / CityVan (2013–2016, based on the Riich X1)
- DR F35 (2020–2023, based on the first-generation Chery Tiggo 7)
- DR Zero (2015–2019, based on the second-generation Chery QQ3)
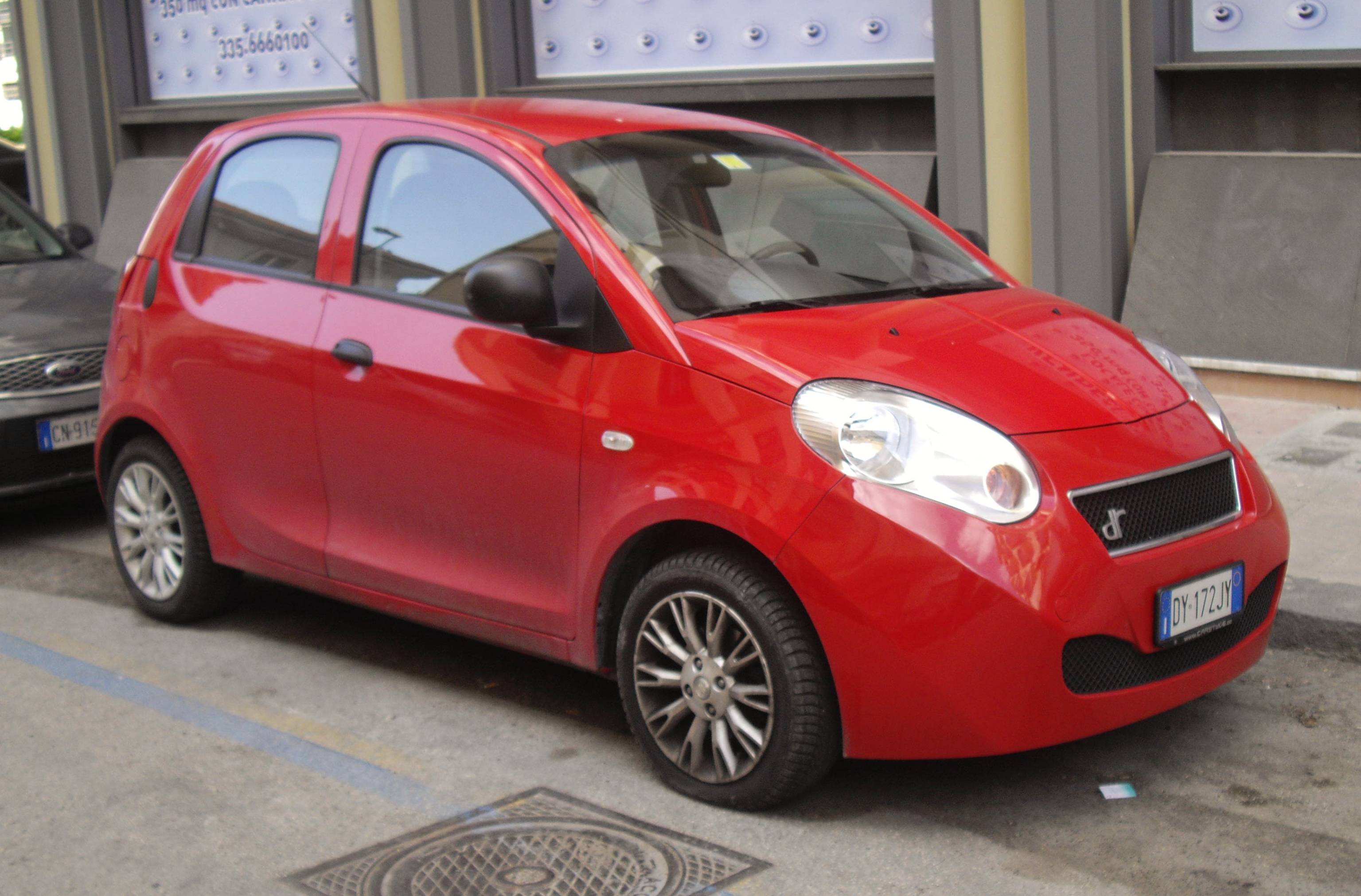
DR 1

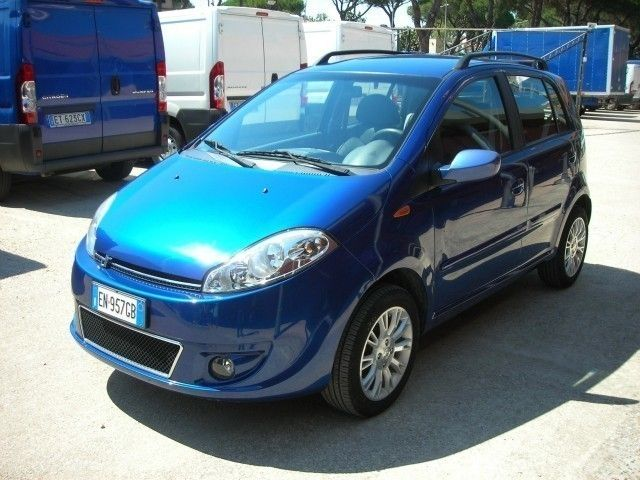
DR 2

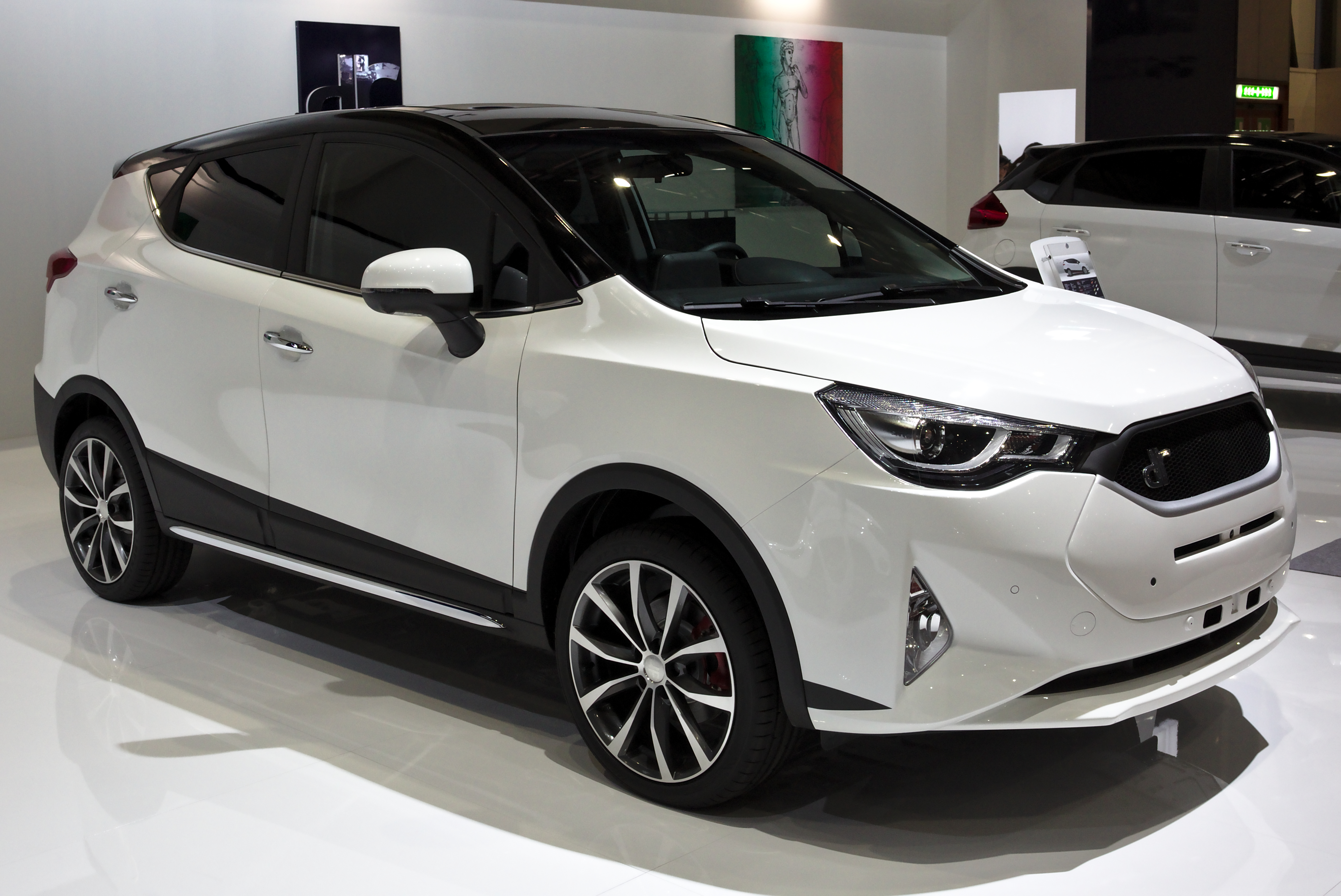
DR 4

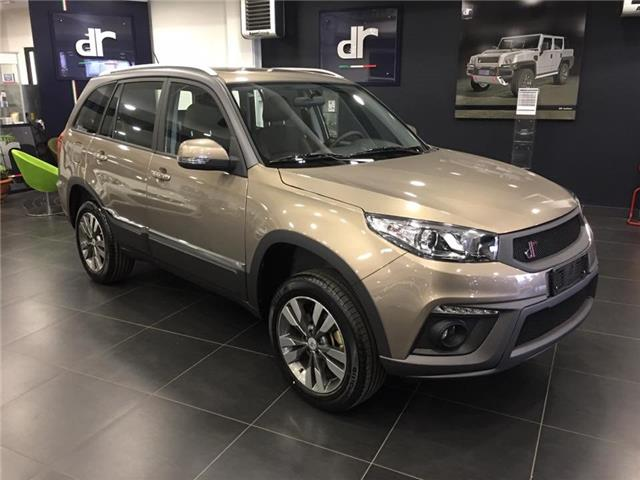
DR 5

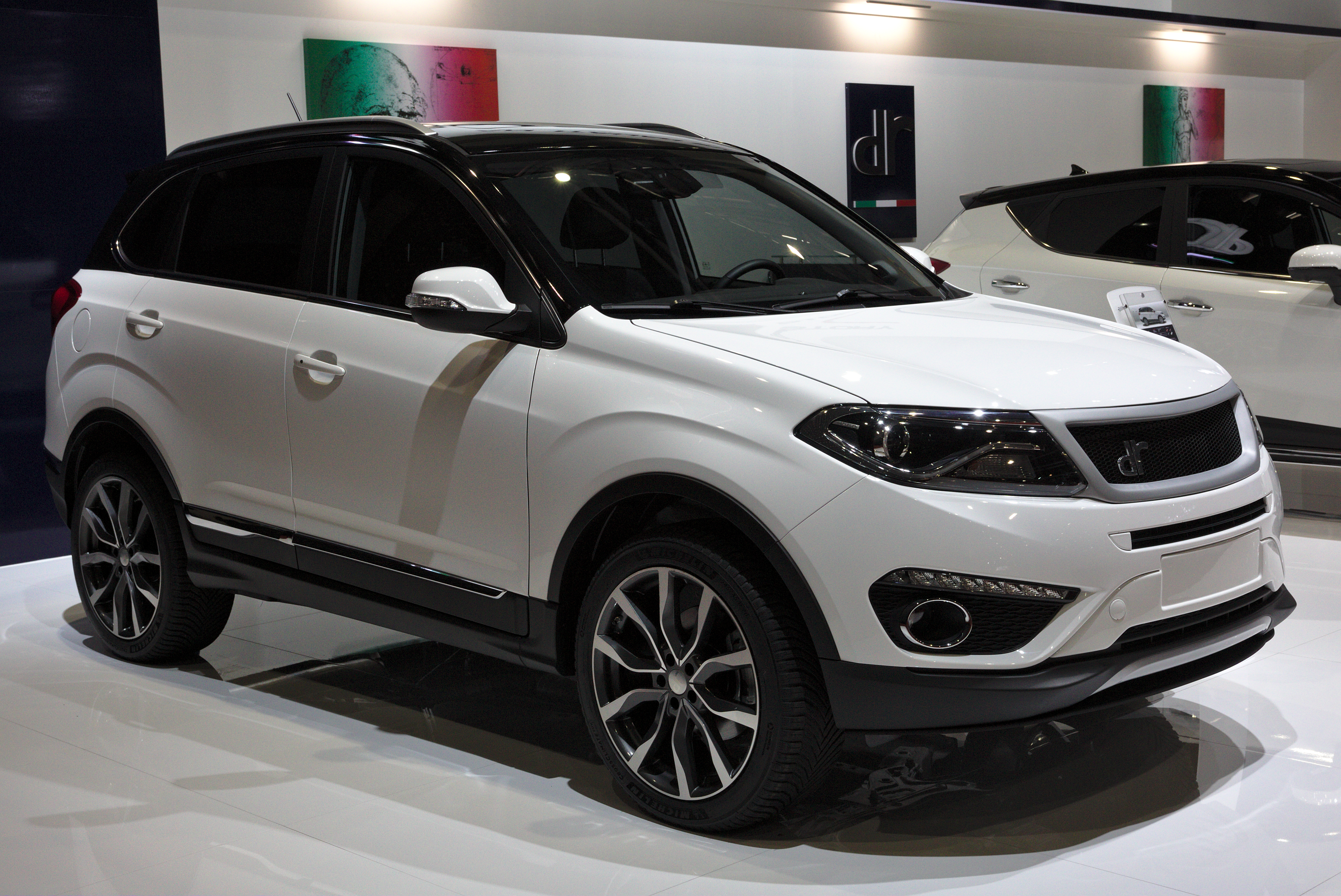
DR 6

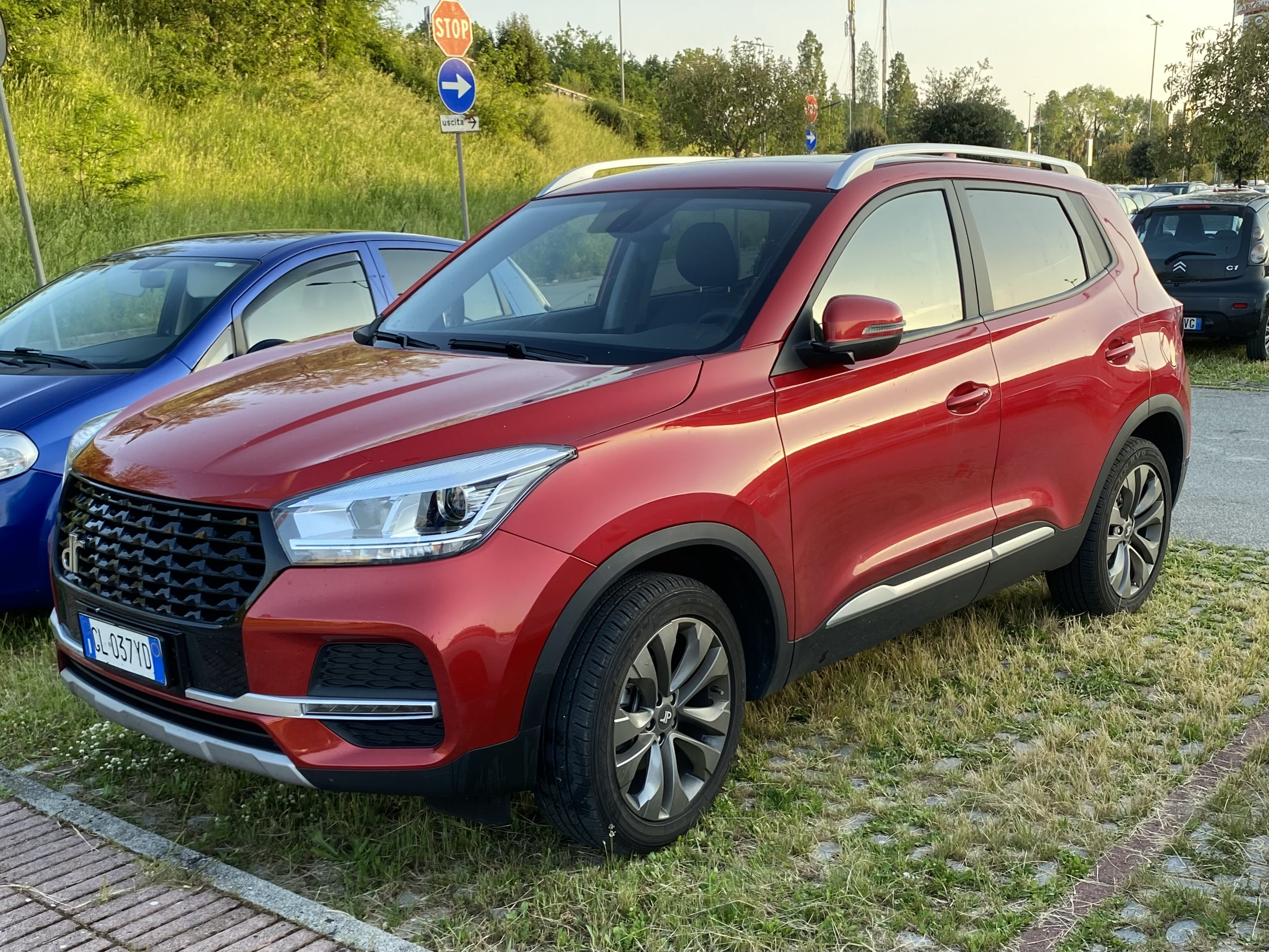
DR 4.0

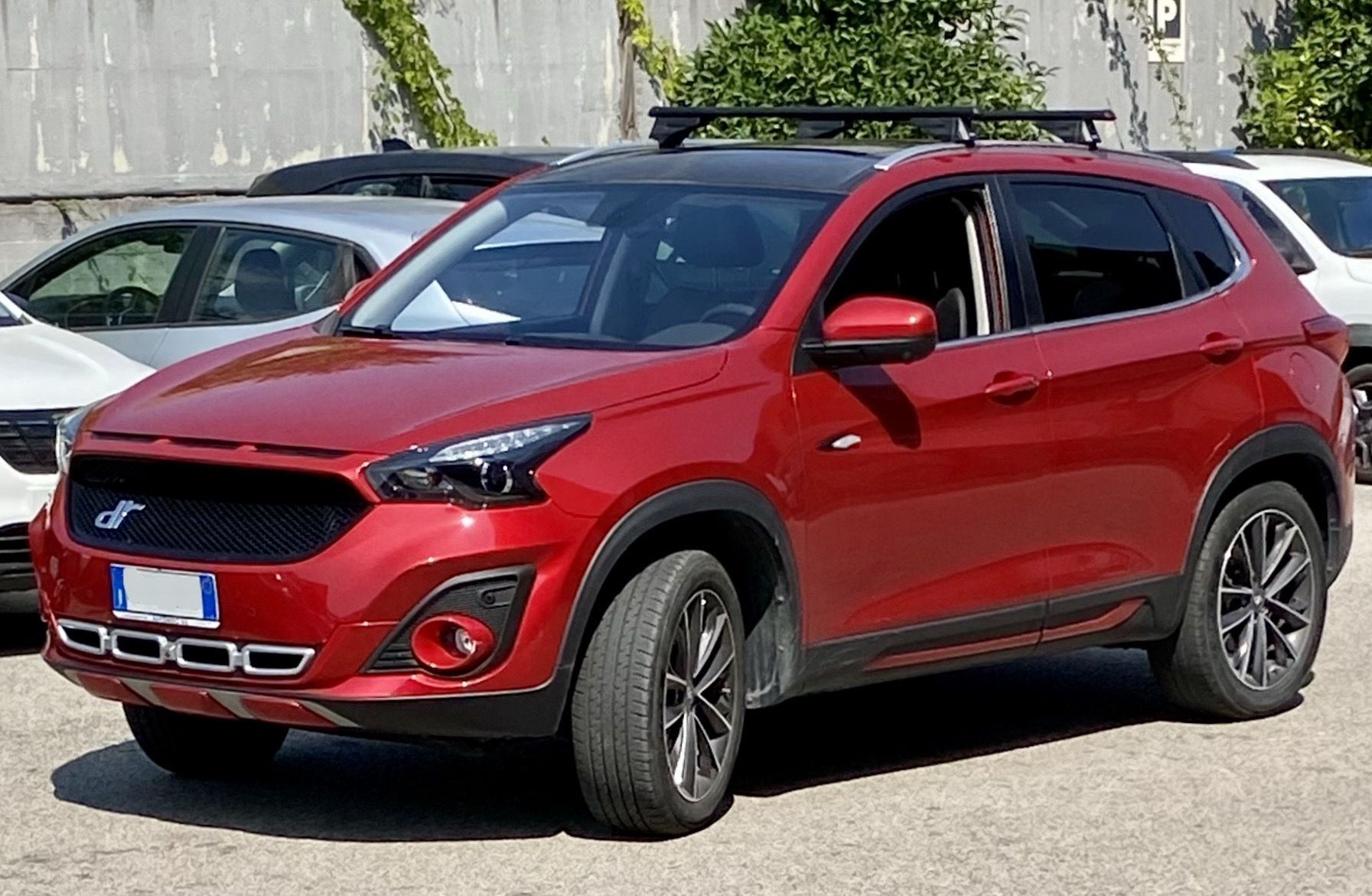
DR F35

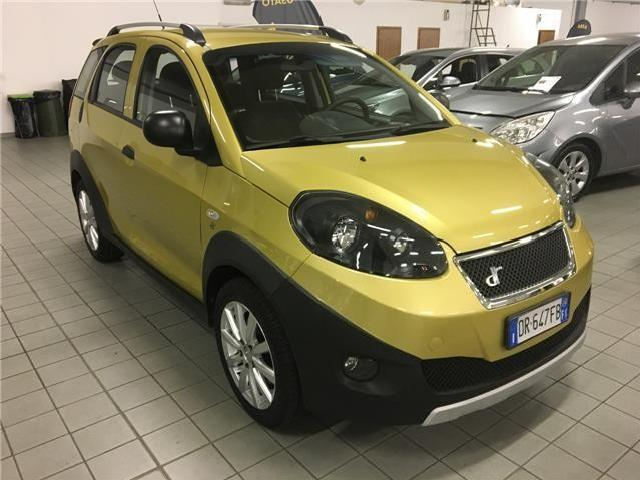
DR CityCross / CityVan

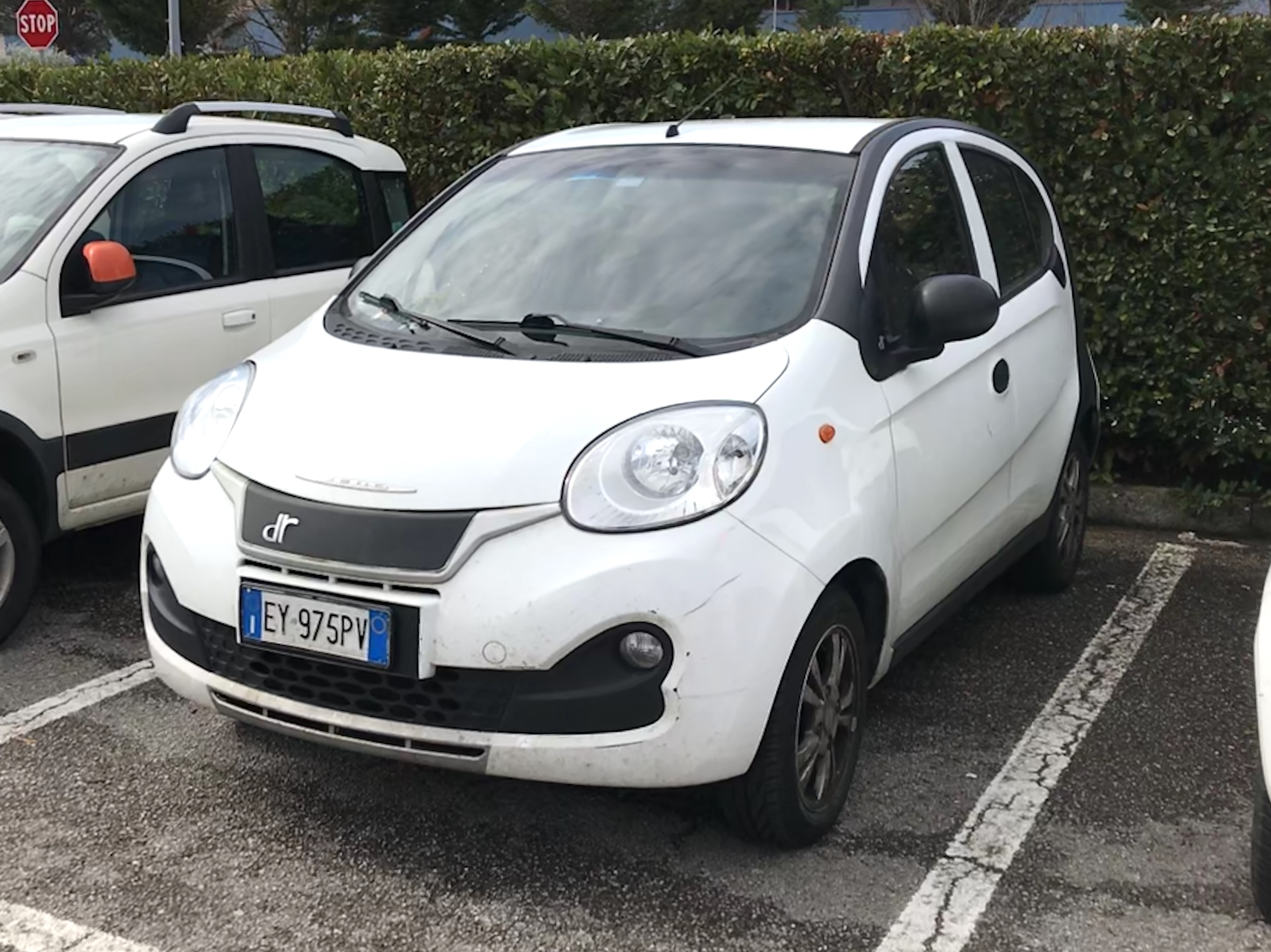
DR Zero

==== EVO ====
- EVO 5 first generation (2020–2023, based on the Chery Tiggo 3)
- EVO 6 first generation (2021, based on the Chery Tiggo 5)
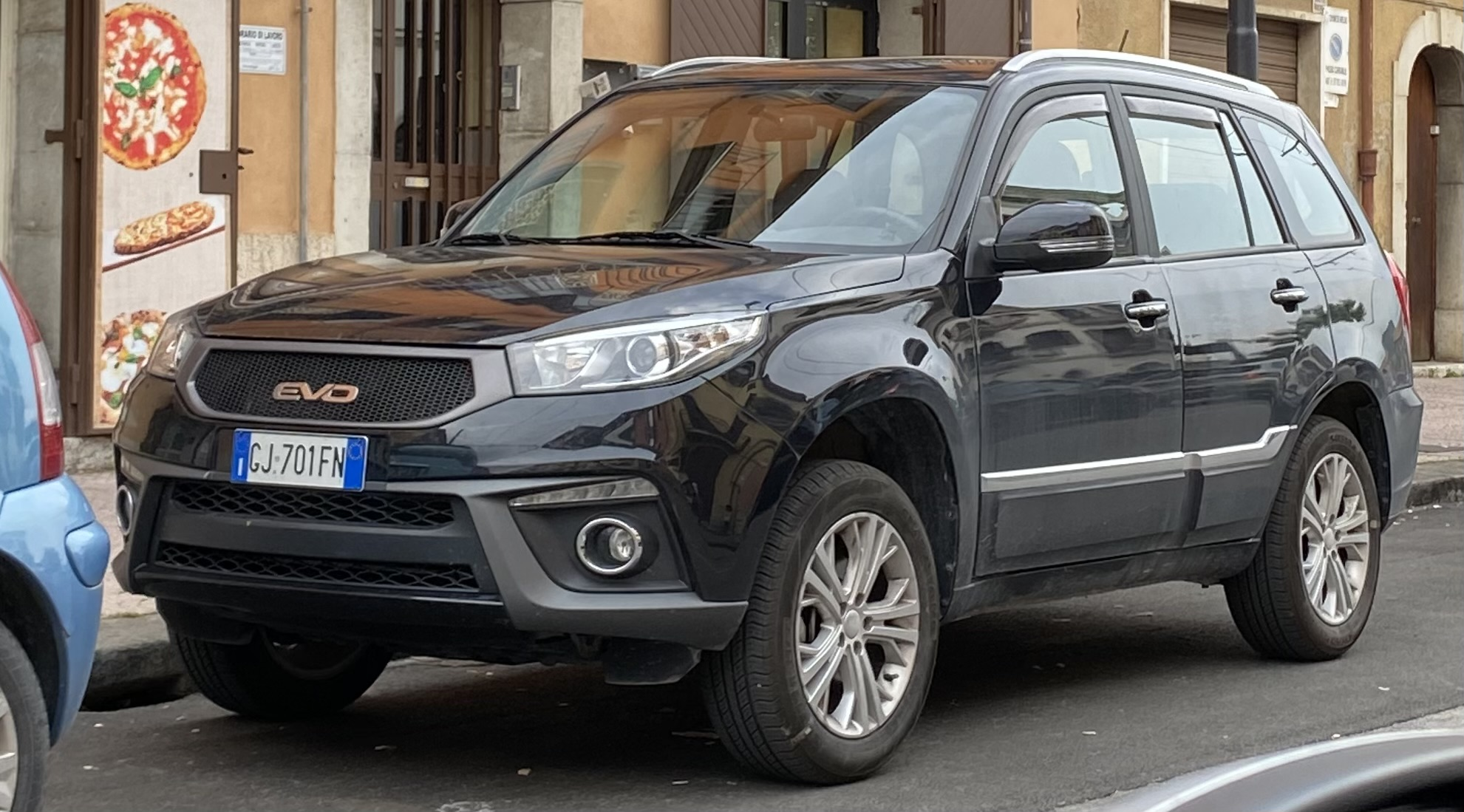
EVO 5 (First-generation)

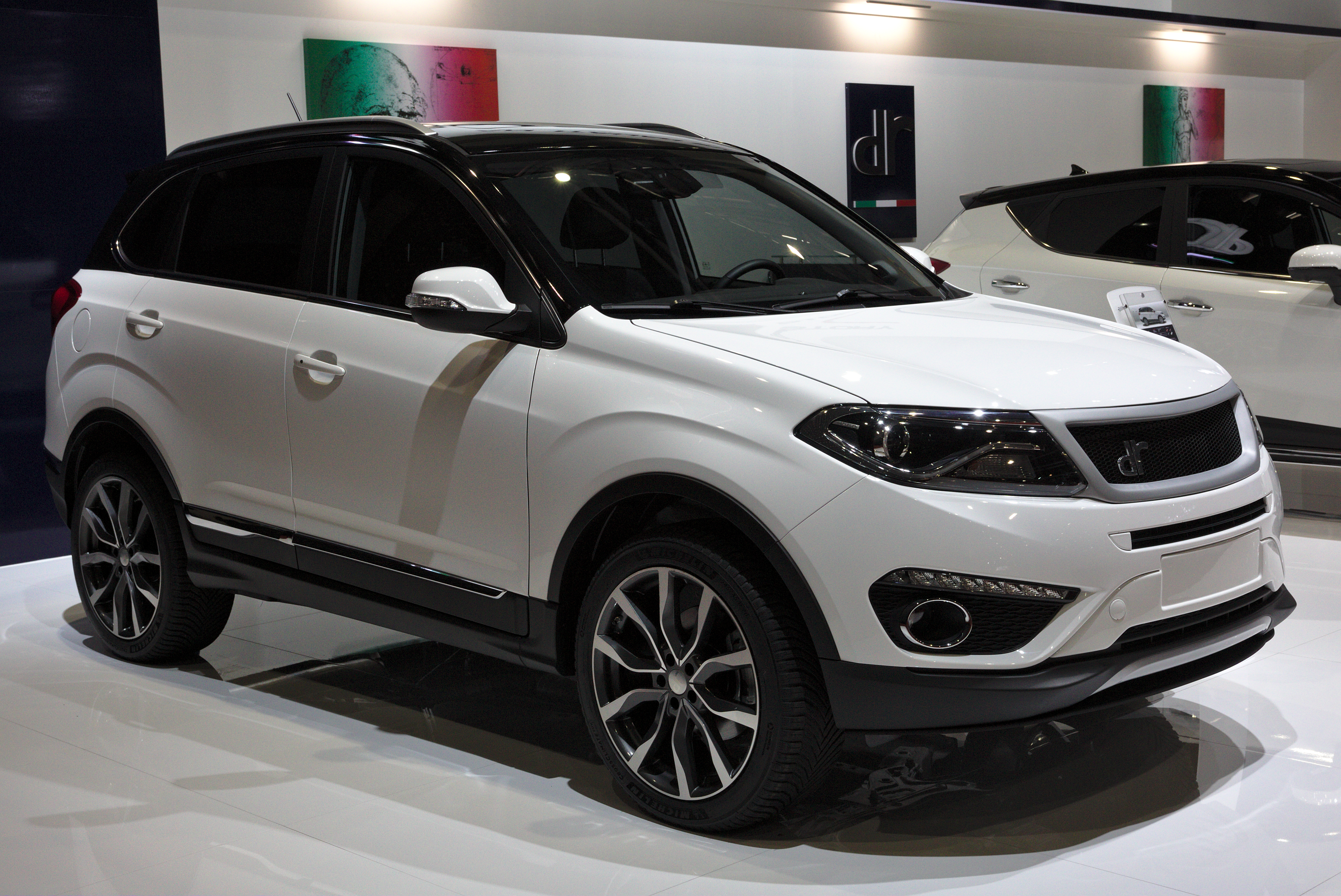
EVO 6 (First-generation)

==== Sportequipe ====
- Sportequipe 1 (2022 prototype, based on the Chery eQ1)
- Sportequipe 5 (2023–2025, based on the Chery Tiggo 5x)
- Sportequipe 6 (2023–2026, based on the second-generation Chery Tiggo 7)
- Sportequipe 7 (2023–2025, based on the Chery Tiggo 8)
- Sportequipe 8 (2023–2026, based on the Chery Tiggo 8 Pro Max)
- Sportequipe SK (2022 prototype, based on the JAC Shuailing T8)
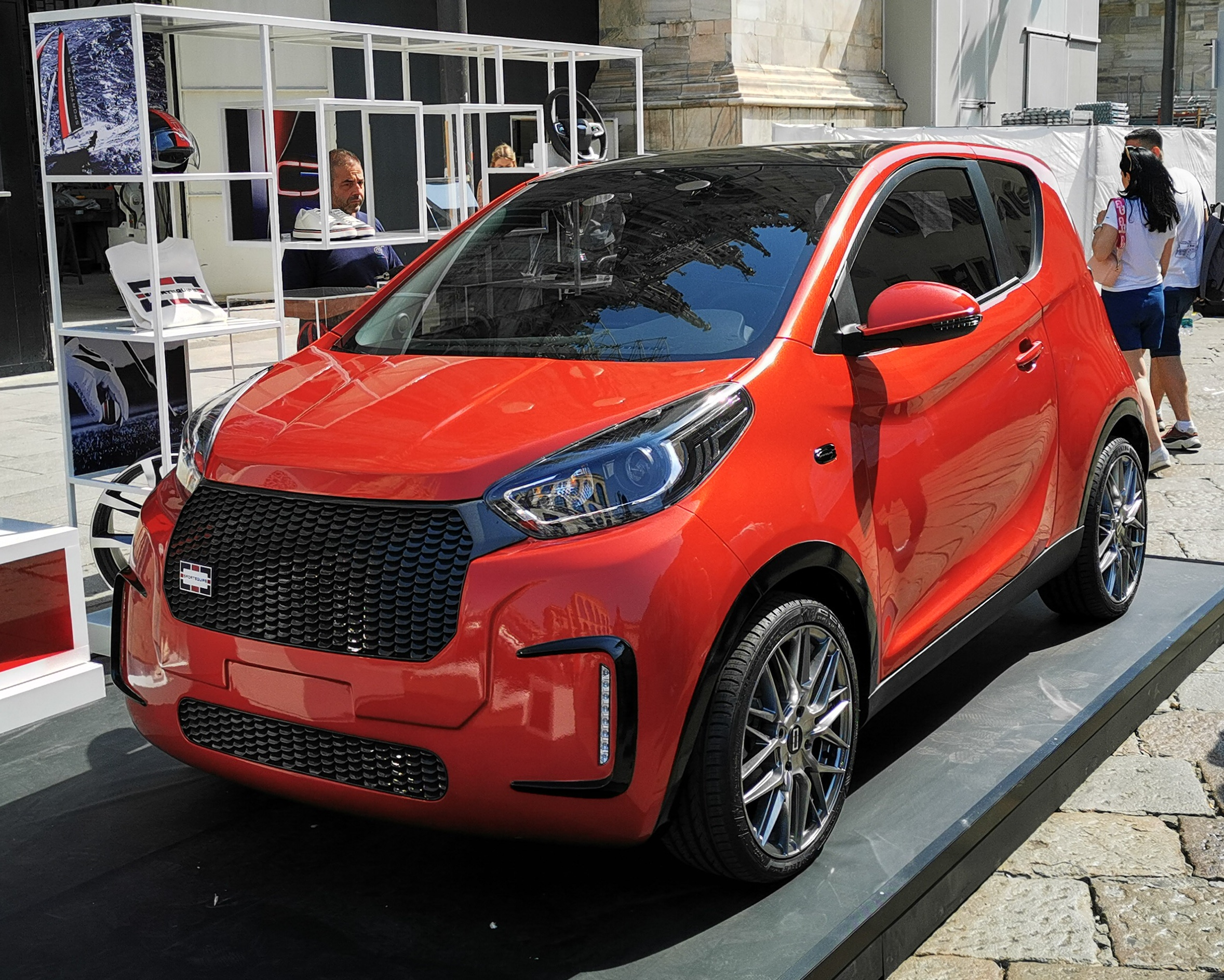
Sportequipe 1

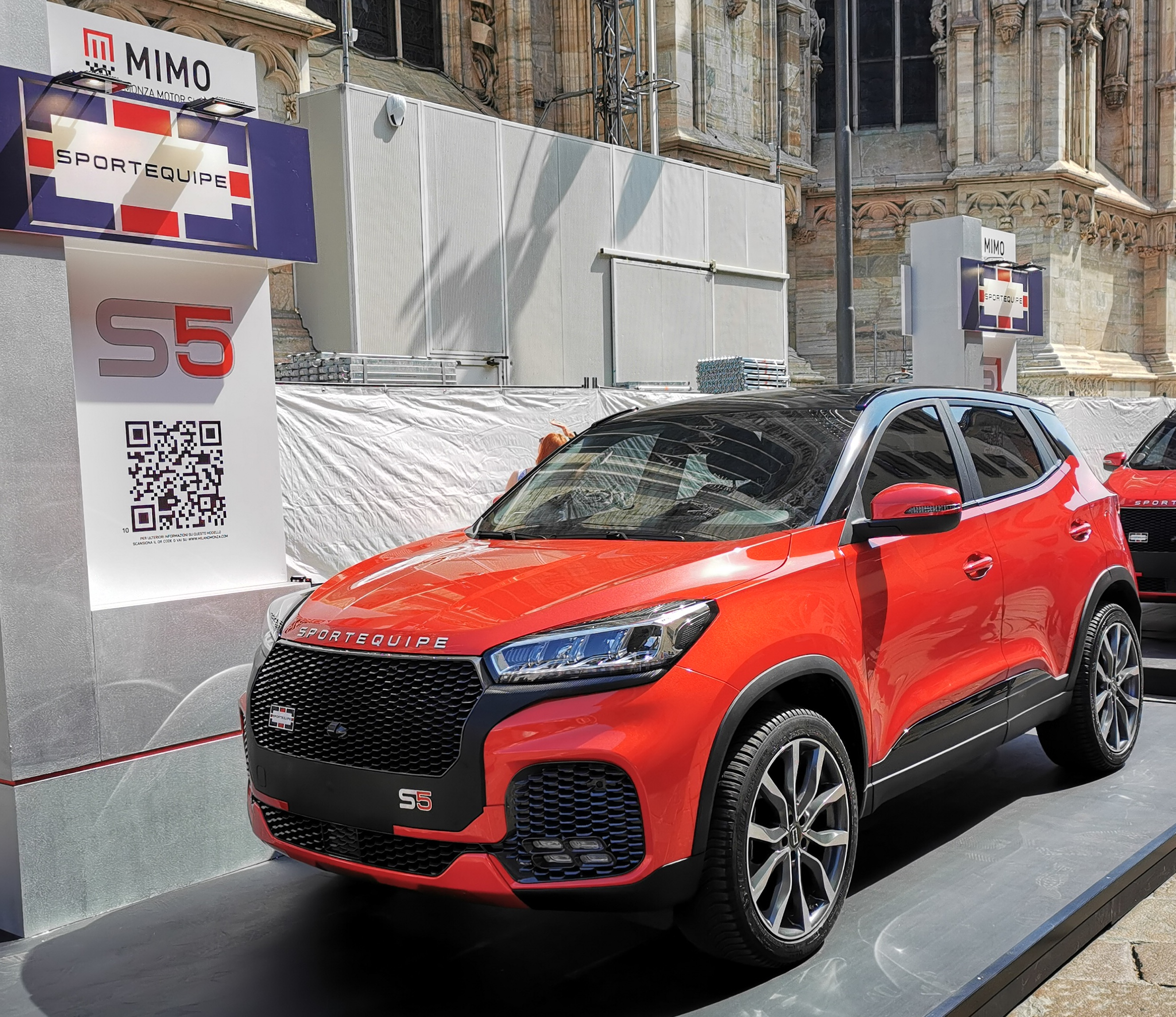
Sportequipe 5

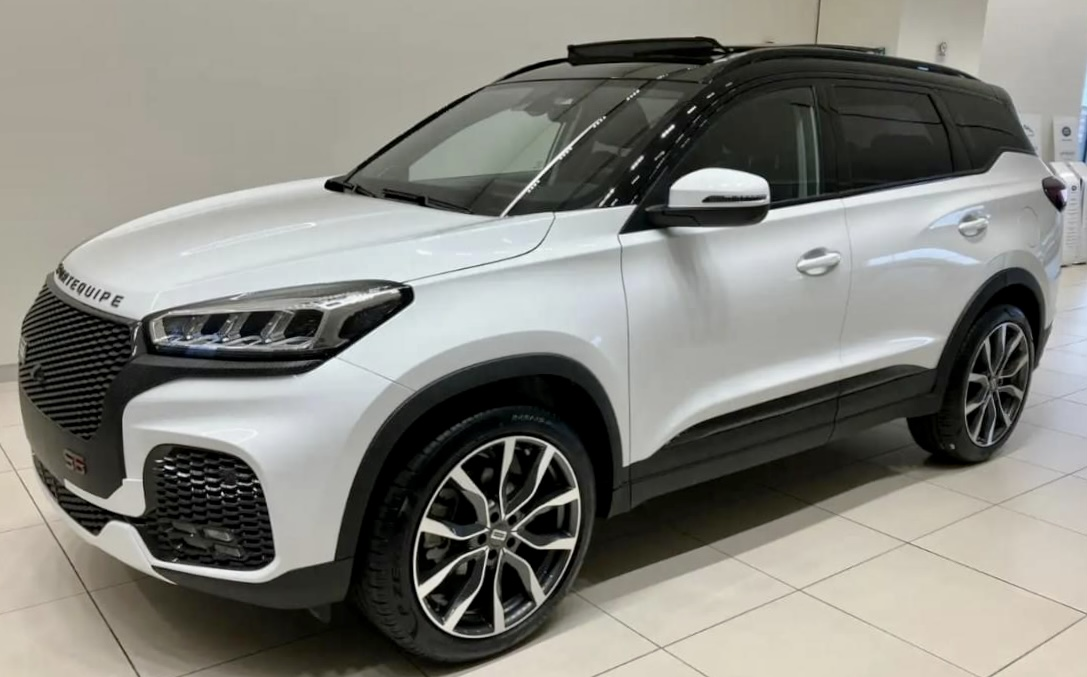
Sportequipe 6

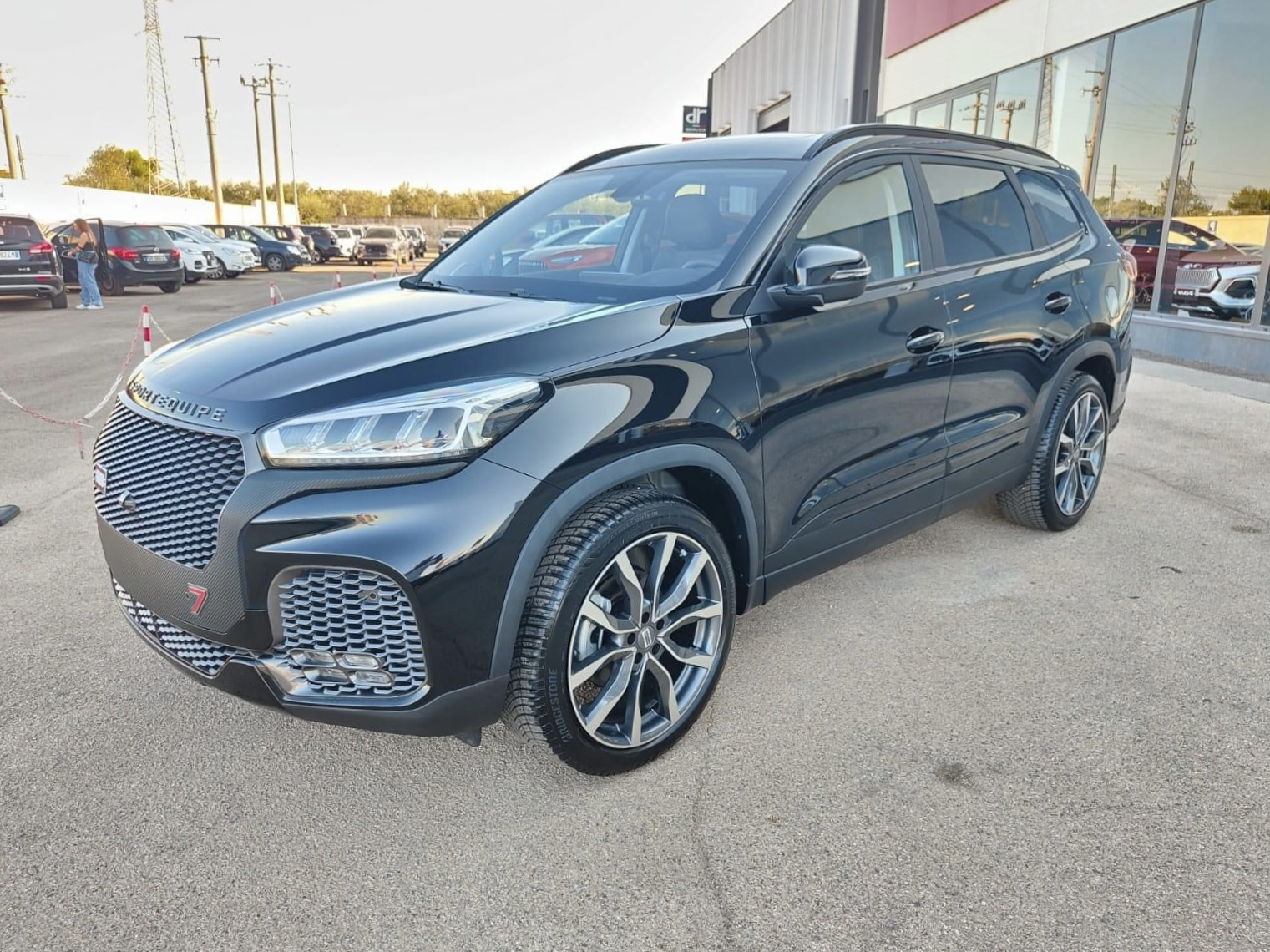
Sportequipe 7

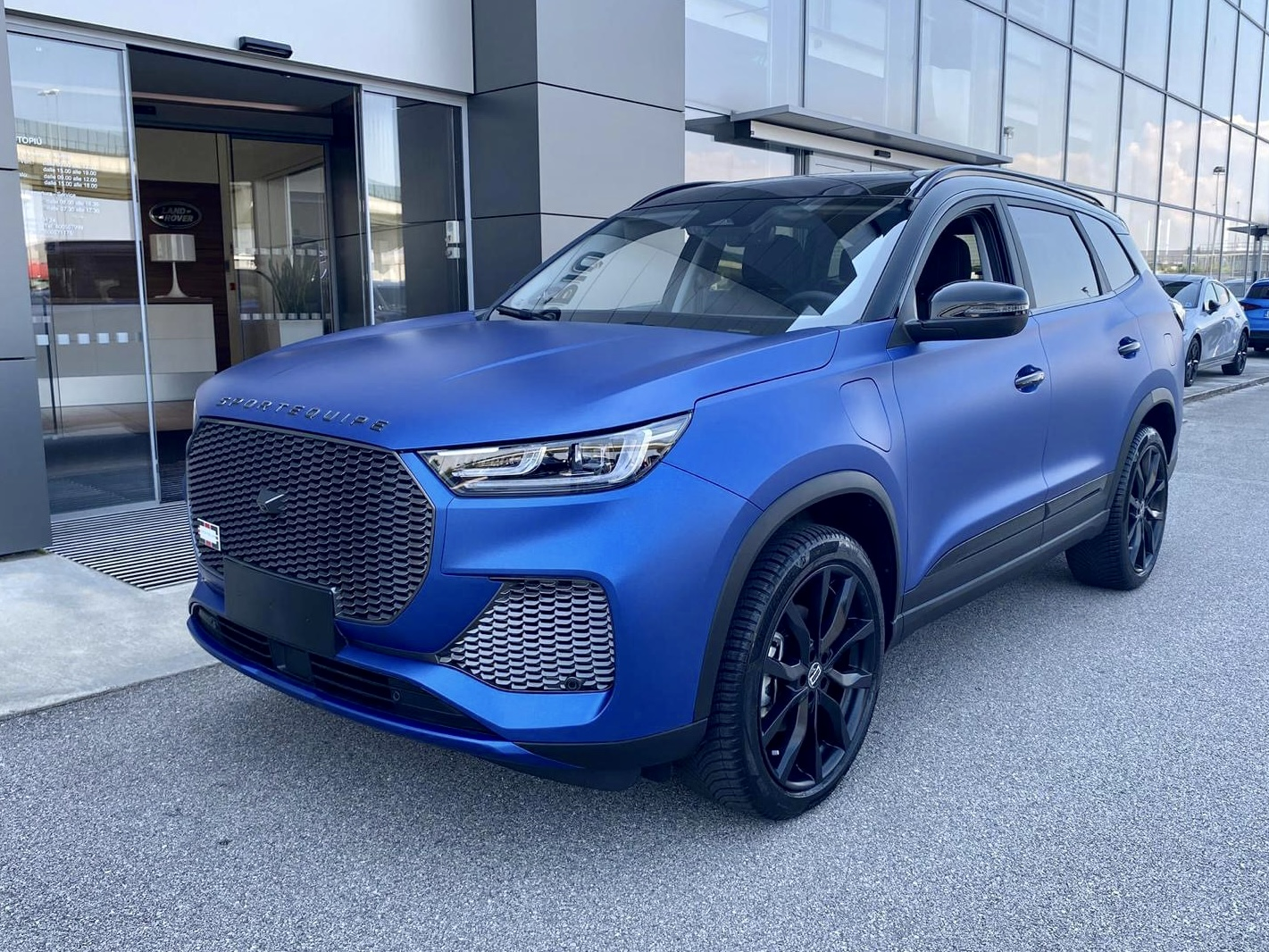
Sportequipe 8

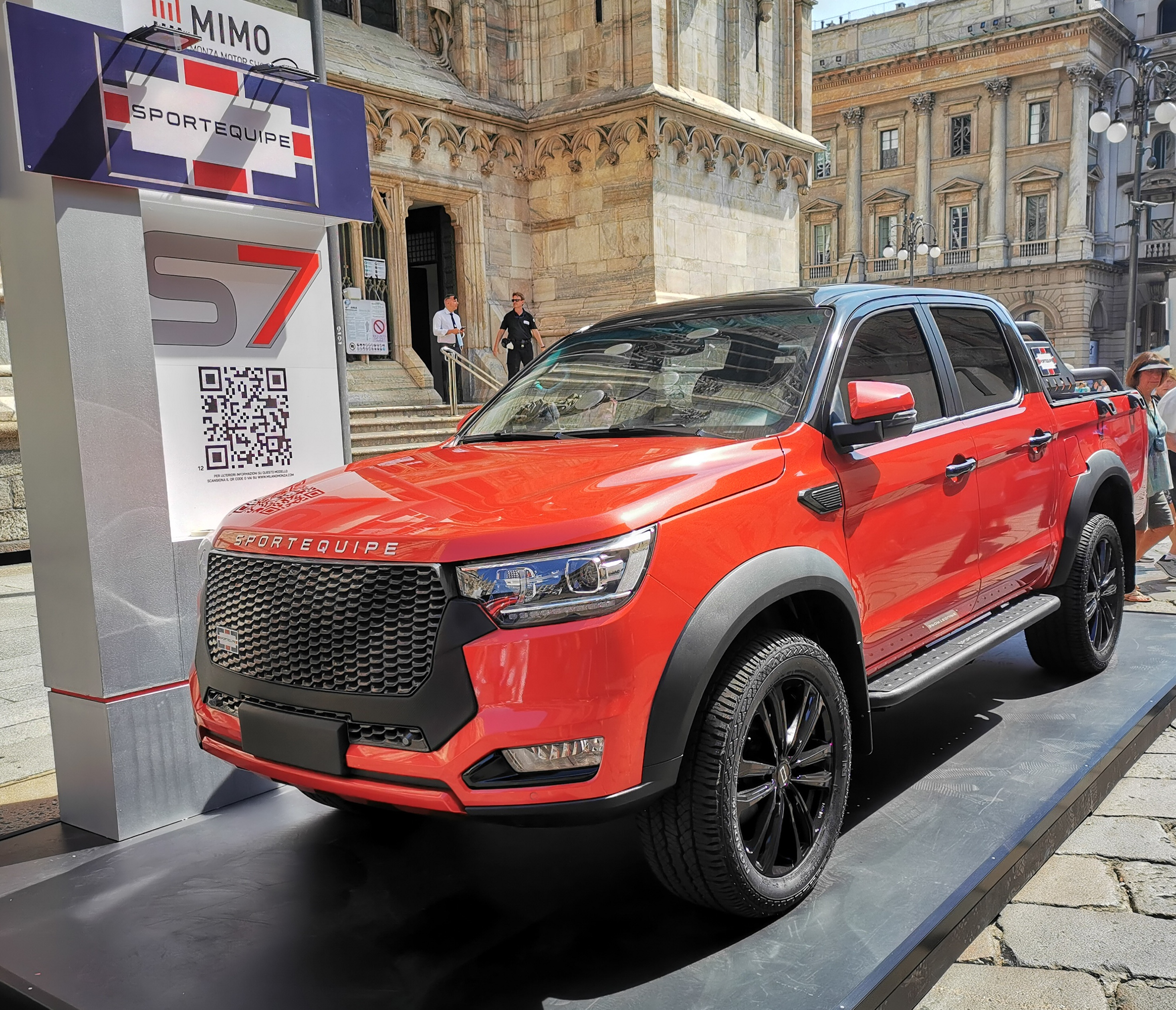
Sportequipe SK

==== Katay ====
- Katay 17 (2025–2026, based on the Reach T10)
