= Tiger Avon =

British kit car

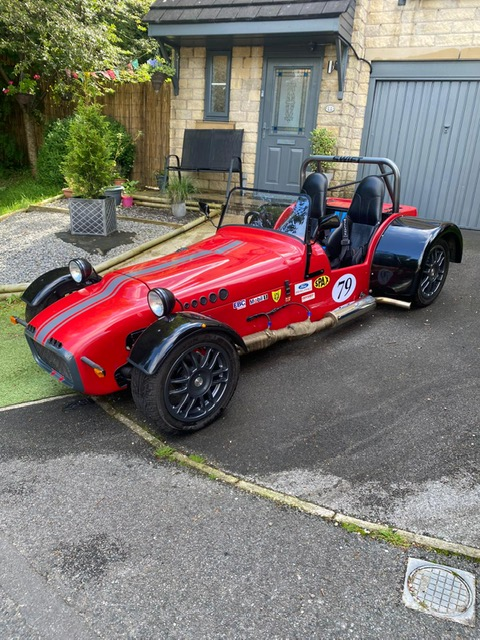

The Tiger Avon is a British kit car from Tiger Racing, a manufacturer formed in 1989 specialising in Lotus Seven type cars and racing cars.

The Tiger Avon is Tiger's entry-level model, and can be fitted with different engines including the Ford Zetec, the Ford OHC and some motorcycle engines. The car consists of a steel spaceframe chassis with fully independent suspension and a fibreglass body. The Tiger Avon was formerly the Phoenix Automotive Avon Sprint. Tiger purchased this project, and modified the chassis and suspension to their requirements.

== Specifications ==
- Chassis: Space frame 1 inch box steel
- Body: GRP
- Engine: OHC Ford(pinto), Zetec, or motorcycle. (Other engines can be fitted.)
- Transmission: Ford Sierra type 9
- Steering: Rack and pinion 3.7 turns(option quick)
- Brakes: Disc front, drum rear, option disc rear
- Suspension: Adjustable front and rear shocks
- Front track: 1300mm
- Rear track: 1485mm
- Wheelbase: 2280mm
- Overall length: 3240mm
- Weight: 595 kg with Zetec
- Wheels: Standard Sierra offset
- Tyres: 185-60-14 (option 15 inch)
