= Modiran Vehicle Manufacturing Company =

Iranian car firm

- Type: Subsidiary
- Industry: Automotive
- Founded: 2002
- Headquarters: Tehran, Iran
- Products: Automobiles; Engines
- Website: www.mvmco.ir

Modiran Vehicle Manufacturing Company (MVM) (Persian: شرکت صنایع خودروسازی مدیران) is an Iranian automobile firm. MVM is a joint venture between Kerman Motor and Chery. MVM was described in 2022 by Donya-e-Eqtesad as having the largest share of the domestic market among private firms and in 2025 by Bloomberg as the most popular foreign car brand in Iran, though in 2026 Pedal reported MVM's parent Kerman Motor under its KMC portfolio passed MVM in sales.

== History ==
MVM, a joint venture between Kerman Motor, an Iranian assembler of Volkswagen cars, and Chery, a Chinese automobile manufacturer, was founded in 2004. MVM was the first significant company to sell Chinese cars in Iran, and enjoyed an early advantage due to the high quantity of standard features provided by Chinese automakers as compared to European-patterned cars. The joint venture has been highly significant for Chery, accounting in 2016 for more than half of its sales abroad. In 2017, MVM production peaked at more than 70,000 vehicles. In response to the growing effects of stricter international sanctions against the Iranian government, Chery adopted an unusual trading structure compared by Bloomberg News to barter, wherein Chery supplied parts and technology to a third party in China, which then shipped the parts to Iran, in return receiving, rather than currency, an equivalent amount of Iranian metals in unprocessed ores and concentrates. However, macroeconomic difficulties continue to keep MVM production rates below capacity as of 2023.

In 2023, Modiran was Iran's largest private consumer of the central bank's controlled foreign currency reserves, using 13% of all currency spent on imports. Mardomsalari, the newspaper published by Iran's Democracy Party, described Modiran as receiving preferential treatment, arguing Modiran consumes a disproportionate amount of Iran's foreign currency considering the Iran Customs Administration's claim that only around a thousand dollars of foreign currency denominated imports are needed per Modiran car. Mardomsalari has taken the stance that foreign currency reserves allocated towards Modiran should instead be allocated towards rendering SAIPA or Iran Khodro more competitive, particularly in light of Modiran pricing its cars more aggressively than do its competitors. The decision to set the price of the X77 at 1.75 billion tomans prompted extensive controversy, and spurred an ultimately unsuccessful attempt to set mandatory price controls for car prices.

== Productions ==
Donya-e-Eqtesad has described MVM as offering more available models than any other Iranian automaker. As of 2022, the most sold MVM model was the MVM x22, a crossover SUV sold in China as the Cherry Tiggo 3x, selling 13,750 units of MVM's total 38,283 units sold. The second-best-selling car was the MVM X77, sold in China as the Chery Tiggo 7.

MVM segments their cars along three brands: MVM branded cars are designated for the lower end of the market, competing with Peugeot and SAIPA; FOWNIX for the medium to high-end, competing with the Bahman Group's Fidelity and Kerman Motor cars; and XTRIM for luxury cars, competing with used imported vehicles. MVM was noted by Pedal to have been one of the first Iranian automakers to distinguish their lineup in this way.

=== MVM ===
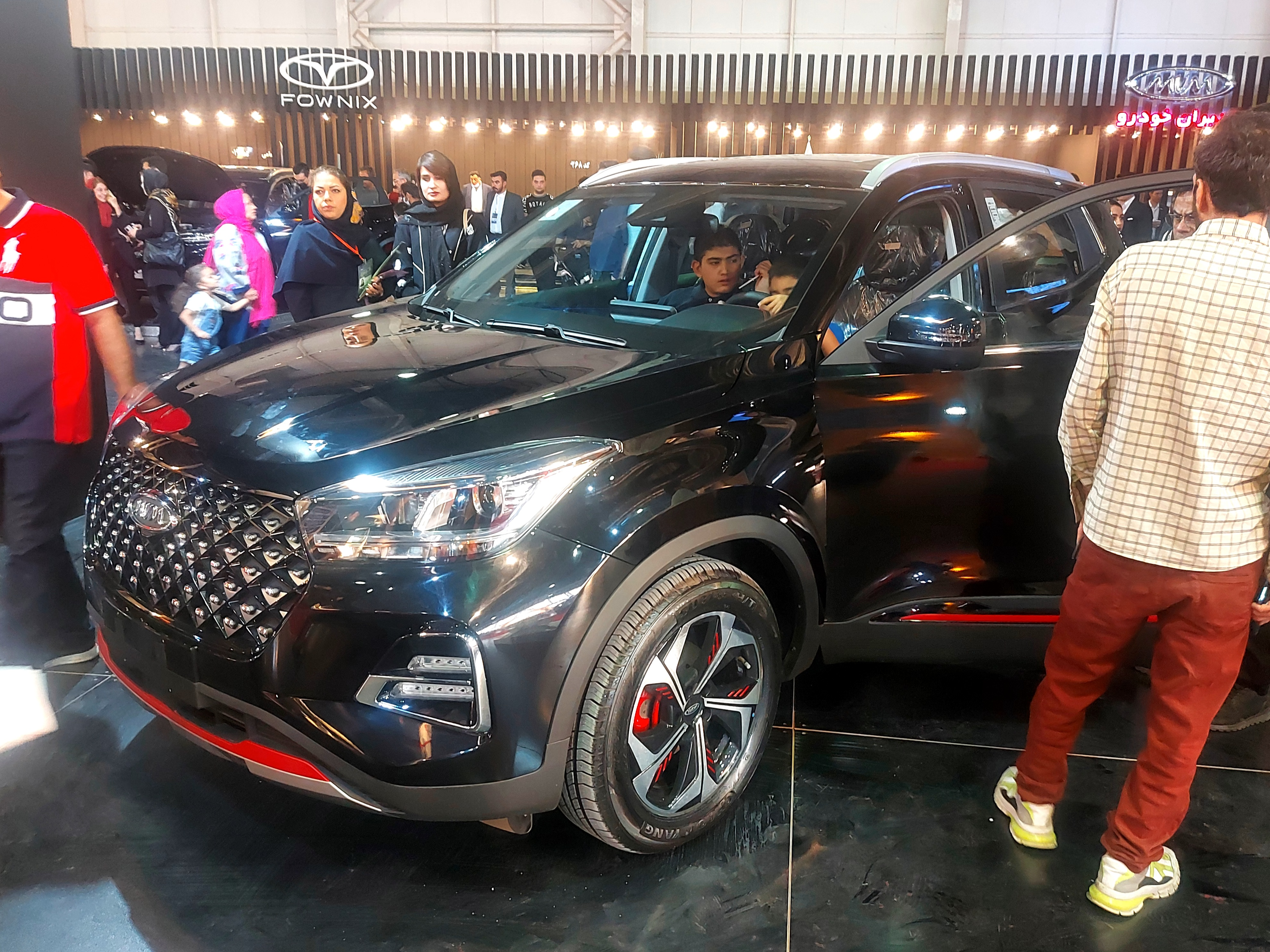
MVM X55 Pro

- MVM 110 - hatchback (Stop Production)
- MVM 110S - hatchback (Stop Production)
- MVM 315 - sedan & hatchback (Stop Production)
- MVM 530 - sedan (Stop Production)
- MVM 550 - sedan (Stop Production)
- MVM X22 - crossover SUV (Stop Production)
- MVM X22 Pro - crossover SUV
- MVM X33 - crossover SUV (Stop Production)
- MVM X33S - crossover SUV (Stop Production)
- MVM X33 Cross - crossover SUV
- MVM X55 - crossover SUV (Stop Production)
- MVM X55 Pro - crossover SUV
- MVM X77 - crossover SUV
- MVM M5 Pro - sedan (Stop Production)
- Chery Arrizo 5 - sedan (Stop Production)
- Chery Arrizo 5S - sedan (Stop Production)
- Chery Arrizo 5 EV - sedan (Stop Selling)
- Chery Arrizo 6 - sedan (Stop Production)
- Chery Tiggo 5 - crossover SUV (Stop Production)
- Chery Tiggo 7 - crossover SUV (Stop Production)

=== Fownix ===
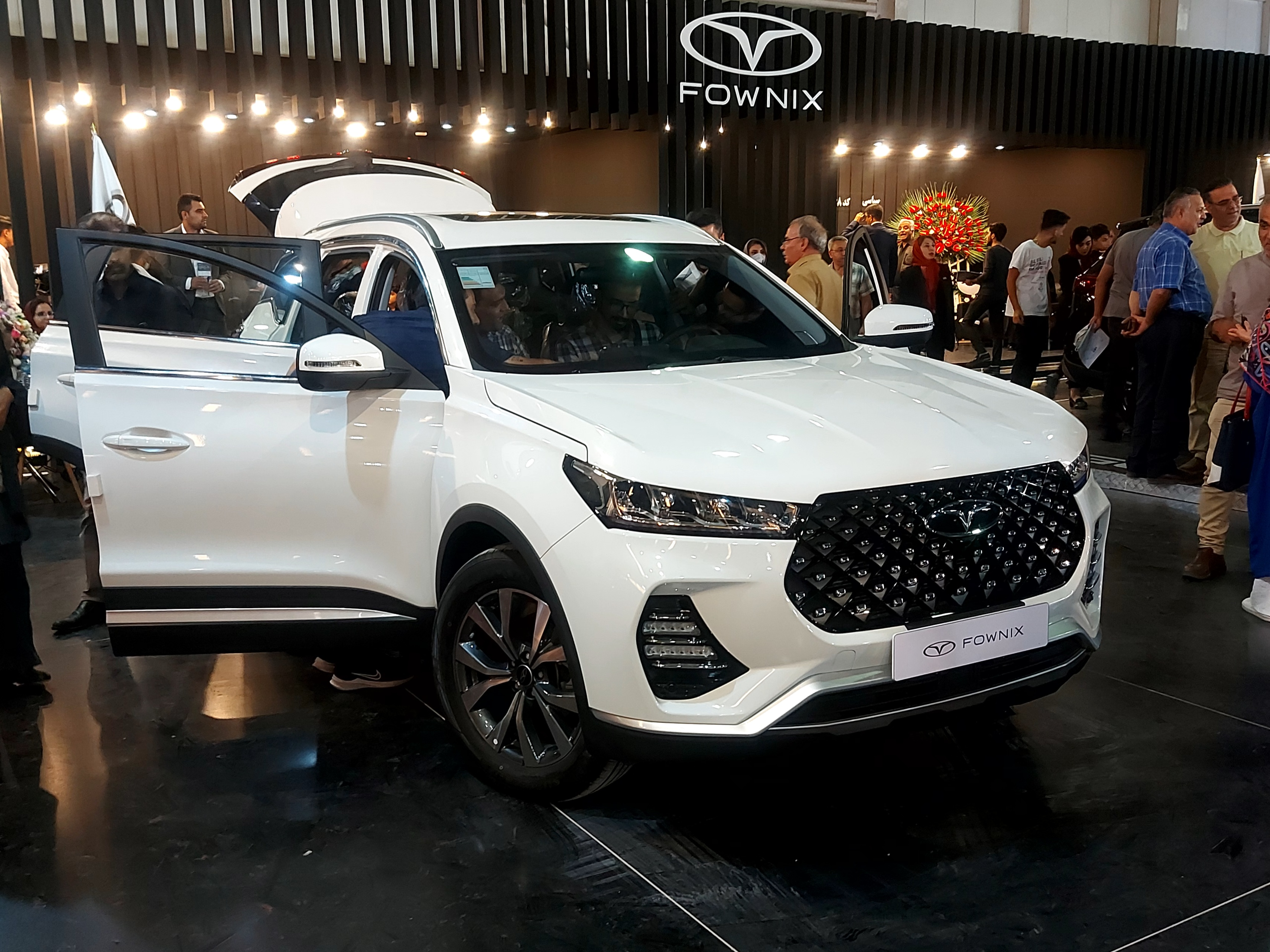
Fownix Tiggo 7 (Laterly F7) Pro

- Fownix Arrizo 6 Pro - sedan (Stop Production)
- Fownix Arrizo 6/Z6 GT - sedan
- Fownix Arrizo 8/Z8 - sedan
- Fownix Arrizo 8/Z8 Hybrid - sedan
- Fownix Tiggo 7/F7 Pro - crossover SUV
- Fownix Tiggo 7/F7 Pro Max - crossover SUV
- Fownix Tiggo 7/F7 Pro Hybrid e+ - crossover SUV
- Fownix Tiggo 8 Pro - crossover SUV (Stop Production)
- Fownix Tiggo 8/F8 Pro Max - crossover SUV
- Fownix Tiggo 8/F8 Pro Hybrid e+ - crossover SUV
- Fownix F9 - crossover SUV
- Fownix FX - crossover SUV
- Fownix FX EV - crossover SUV

=== Xtrim ===
- Xtrim LX - crossover SUV
- Xtrim TXL - crossover SUV
- Xtrim VX - crossover SUV
