= Omoda O5 =

Omoda O5 can refer to 2 vehicles produced by Chery under the Omoda brand:

- Omoda C5, sold in some markets as the Omoda O5
- Chery Arrizo 5 Plus, sold in some markets as the Omoda O5
