= Chery Arrizo 5 =

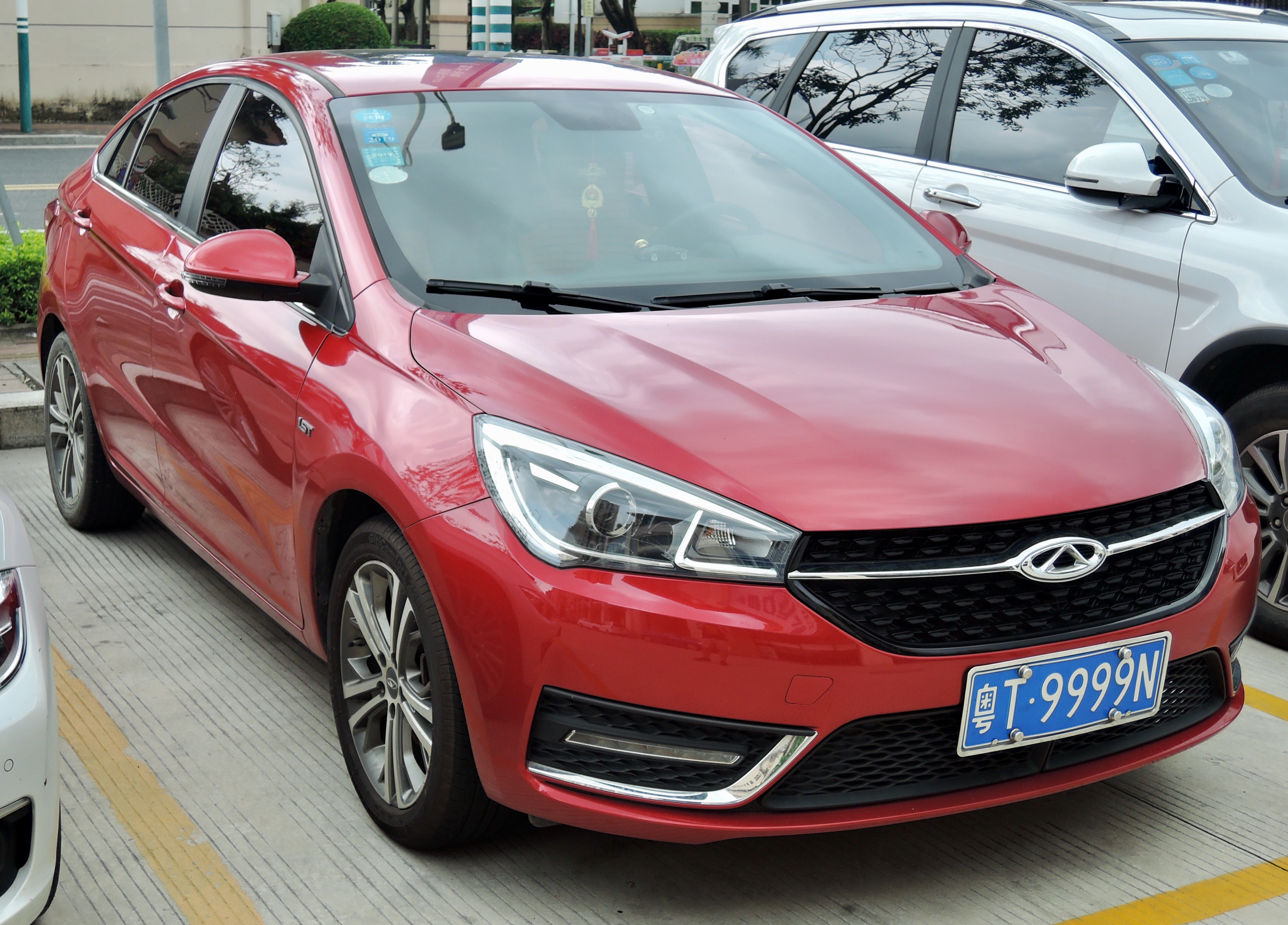

Overview
- Manufacturer: Chery
- Also called: Chery Arrizo EX (2019–2020); Cowin E5; Sinogold Junxing (2022–2024)
- Production: 2016–present
- Assembly: China: Wuhu, Anhui; China: Shandong (Sinogold); Brazil: Jacareí; Iran: Bam, Kerman Province (MVM); Egypt: Cairo (GB Corp)
- Designer: Lowie Vermeersch of Granstudio

Body and chassis
- Class: Compact car
- Body style: 4-door saloon
- Layout: Front-engine, front-wheel-drive
- Platform: Chery M1X
- Related: Chery Arrizo 5 Plus

Powertrain
- Engine: 1.5 L E4G15C I4 (petrol); 1.6 L E4G16C I4 (CNG); 1.5 L E4T15B turbo I4 (petrol)
- Electric motor: Arrizo 5e/e: 120 kW (161 hp) permanent magnet motor/generator
- Transmission: 5-speed manual 9-speed CVT
- Battery: Arrizo 5e/e: 53.6 kWh lithium-ion
- Electric range: Arrizo 5e/e: 401 kilometres (249 mi) (NEDC)

Dimensions
- Wheelbase: 2,670 mm (105.1 in)
- Length: 4,572 mm (180.0 in)
- Width: 1,825 mm (71.9 in)
- Height: 1,482 mm (58.3 in); 1,496 mm (58.9 in) (Chery Arrizo 5e/e/Sinogold Junxing)

Chronology
- Predecessor: Chery E5
- Successor: Cowin Xuandu (Cowin E5)

The Chery Arrizo 5 (Chinese: 艾瑞泽5) is a compact sedan produced by Chery. The Chery Arrizo 5 received a name change to Chery Arrizo EX from 2019 to 2020 and the name was changed back to Chery Arrizo 5. The Arrizo 5 also spawned a more upmarket model based on the same platform called the Arrizo 6 or Arrizo GX that debuted during the 2018 Beijing Auto Show, with the model name being changed again to Arrizo 5 Plus after the facelift in 2021.

== Overview ==
The Arrizo 5 was previewed by the Chery Concept Alpha that debuted on the 2014 Beijing Auto Show and the Chery Alpha 5 concept that was unveiled at the 2015 Shanghai Auto Show.

The engines available includes a 1.5 liter engine with 116 hp and 148 nm, mated to a five-speed manual transmission or a CVT. Later adding a 1.2 liter turbo engine producing 132 hp and 212 nm and a 1.5 liter turbo engine with 145 hp and 220 nm. The production version of the Chery Arrizo 5 sedan debuted during the 2015 Guangzhou Auto Show and pricing for the Arrizo 5 will be from 63,900 to 82,900 yuan.

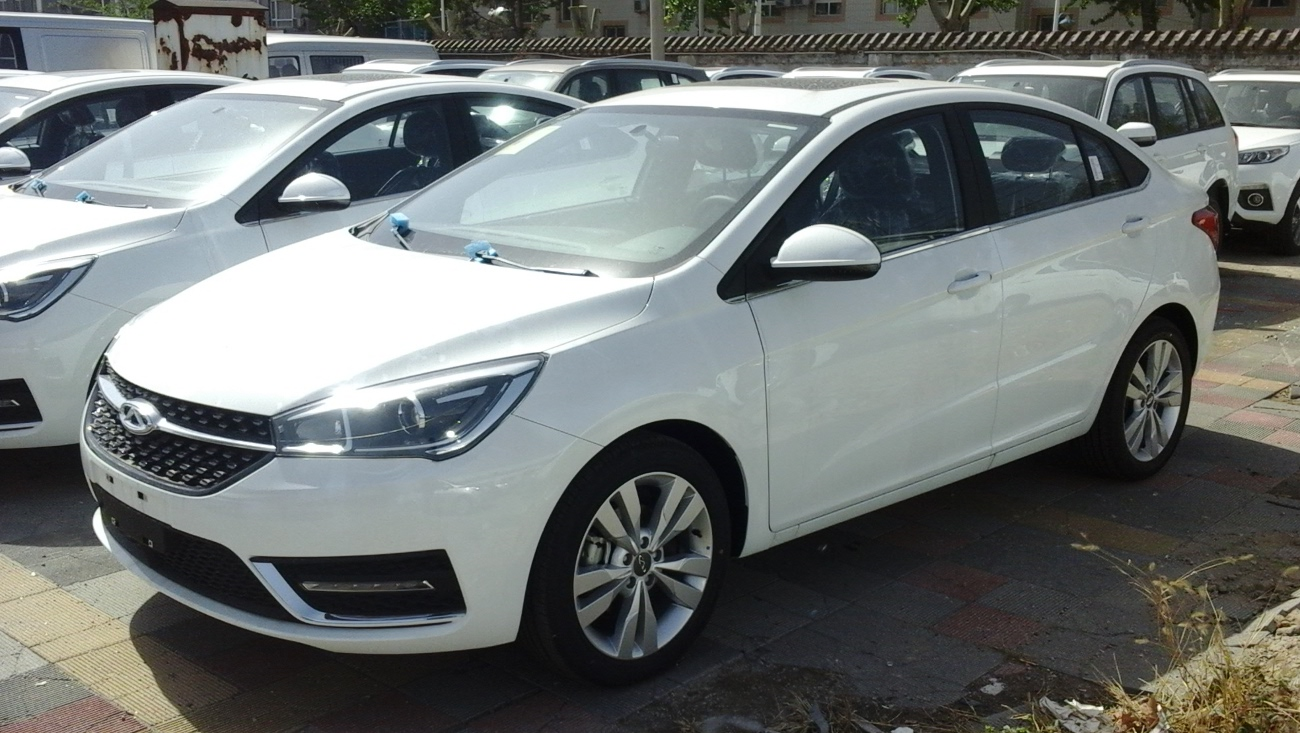
Chery Arrizo 5 front

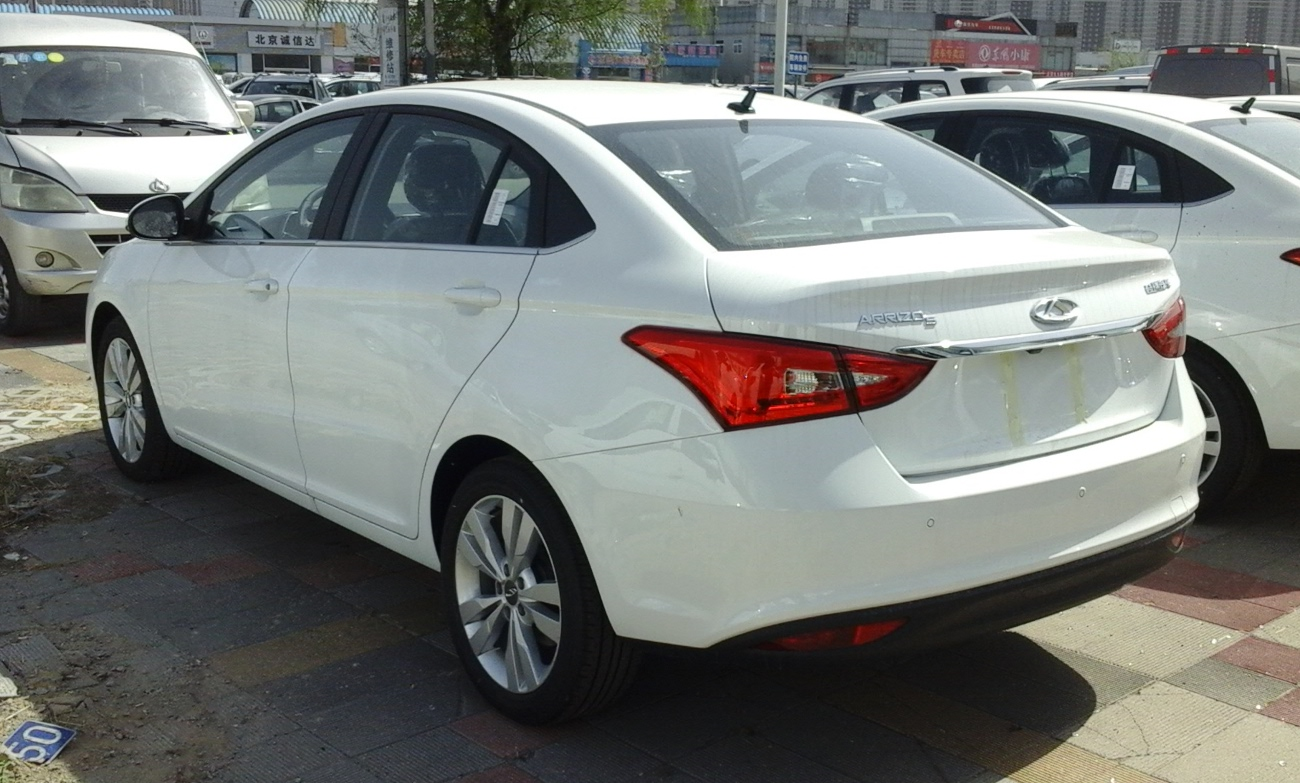
Chery Arrizo 5 rear

=== 2024 facelift ===
The Arrizo 5 received a facelift in October 2023 for the 2024 model year, updating the front bumper design.The update also includes an updated powertrain, with a new generation 1.5 liter high efficiency Miller cycle engine producing a maximum output of 88kW and 148N·m. The transmission is either a 5-speed manual gearbox or a CVT with simulated 9-speed.

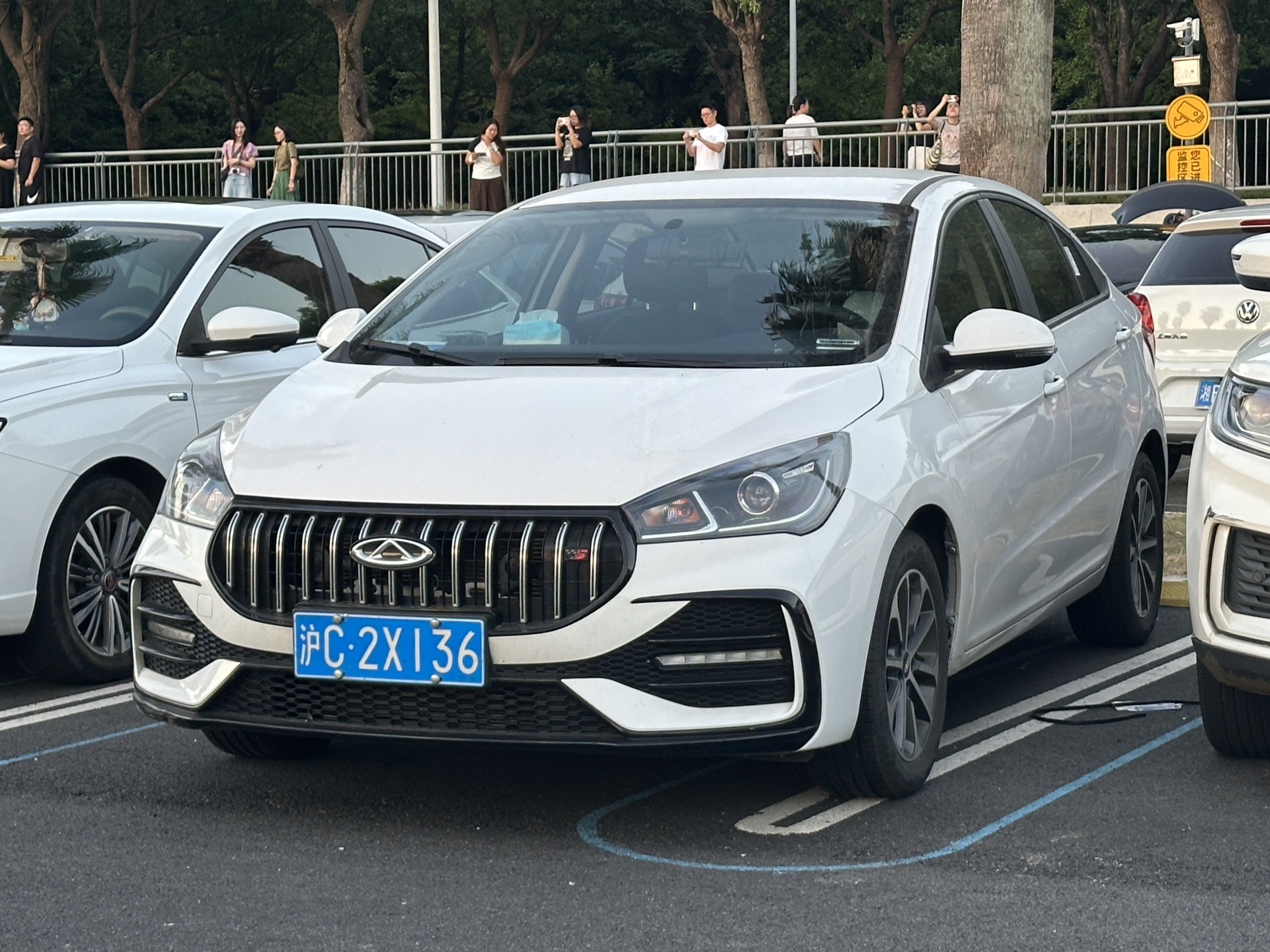
Chery Arrizo 5 2024 facelift

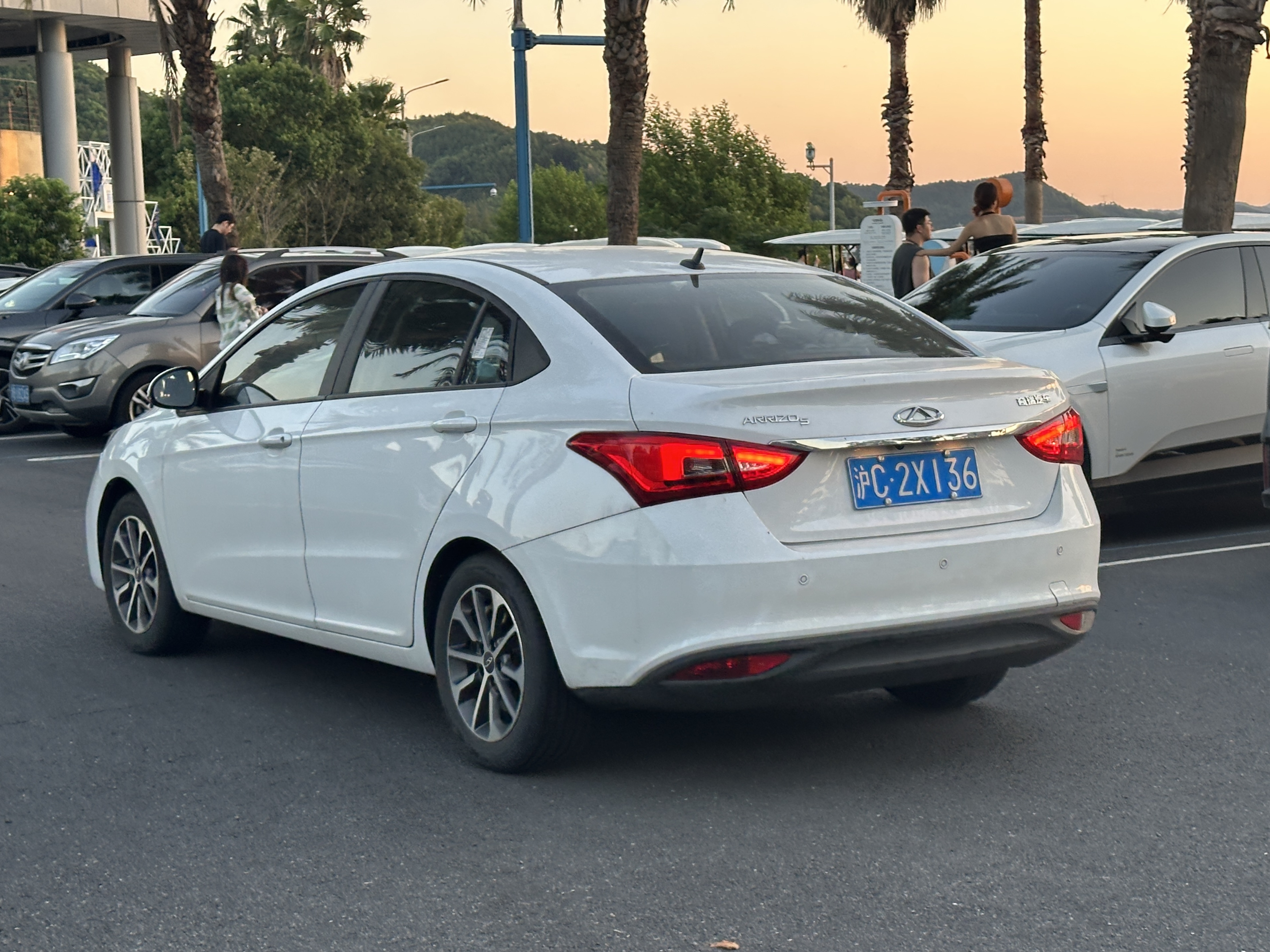
2024 facelift rear

== Arrizo EX ==
From 2019 to 2020 the facelift model of the Arrizo 5 was briefly sold as the Arrizo EX with the slightly more upmarket Arrizo GX being sold alongside as a more premium option. The name was changed back to Arrizo 5 in 2020 and the Arrizo GX was changed to Arrizo 5 Plus for the facelift of the 2021 model year.

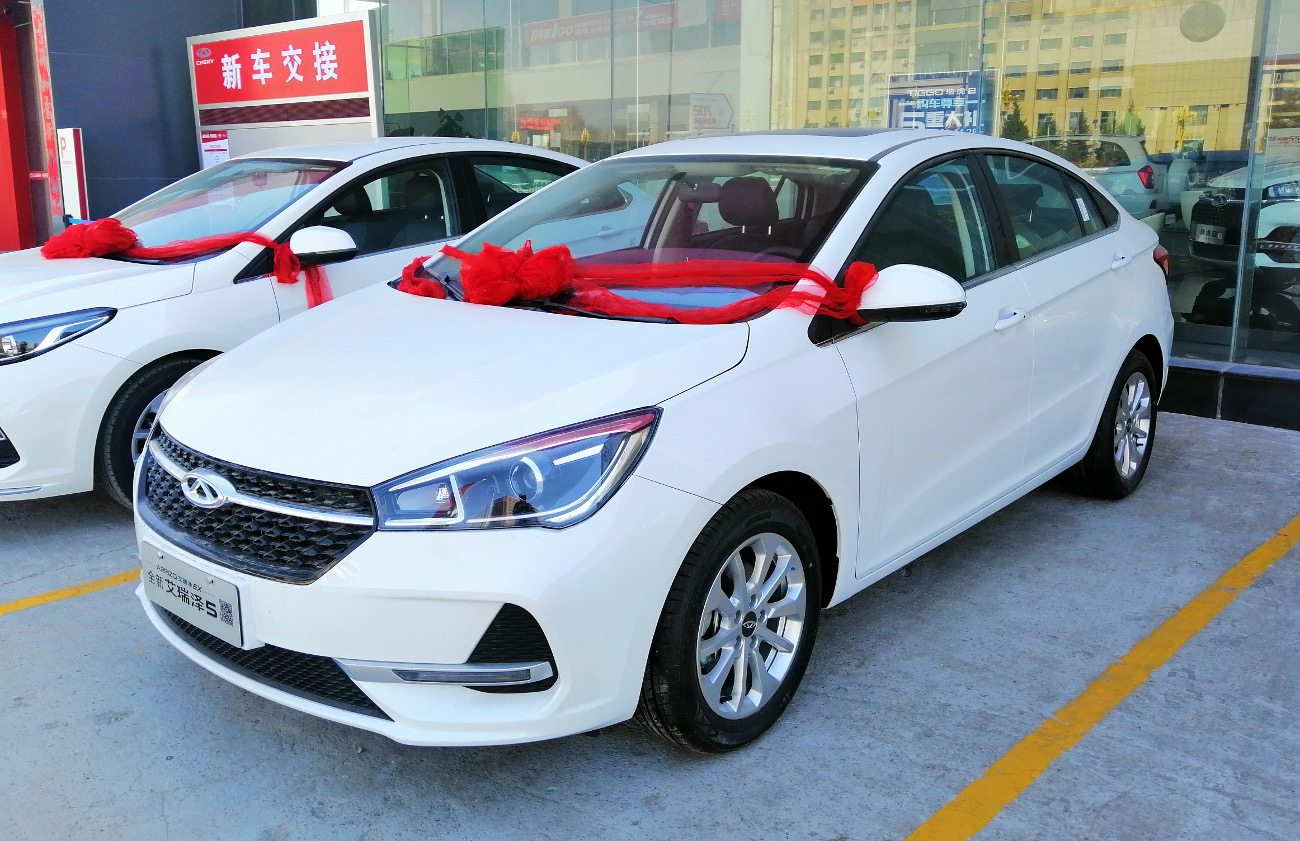
Chery Arrizo EX front

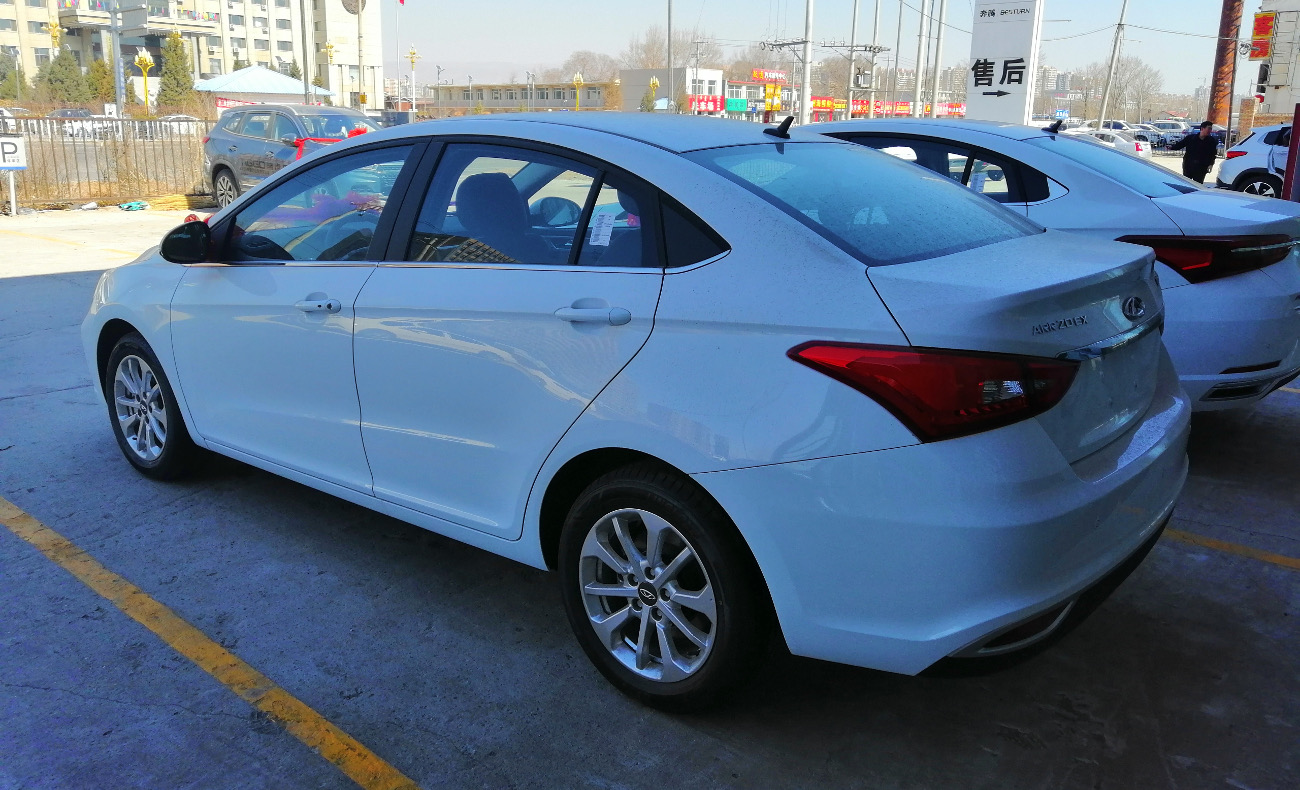
Chery Arrizo EX rear

== Arrizo 5 Sport ==
The Arrizo 5 Sport is the performance variant of the Arrizo 5. The engine is a 1.5L turbo with 144 hp (107 kW; 146 PS) and 210 N⋅m (155 lb⋅ft) of torque, mated to a five-speed manual or a CVT. The Arrizo 5 Sport gets a body kit including a redesigned front bumper, side skirts, new 5 spoke alloys, red brake calipers, a spoiler on the rear deck, and red interior trim. Pricing for the Arrizo 5 Sport starts from 76,900 yuan to 97,900 yuan.

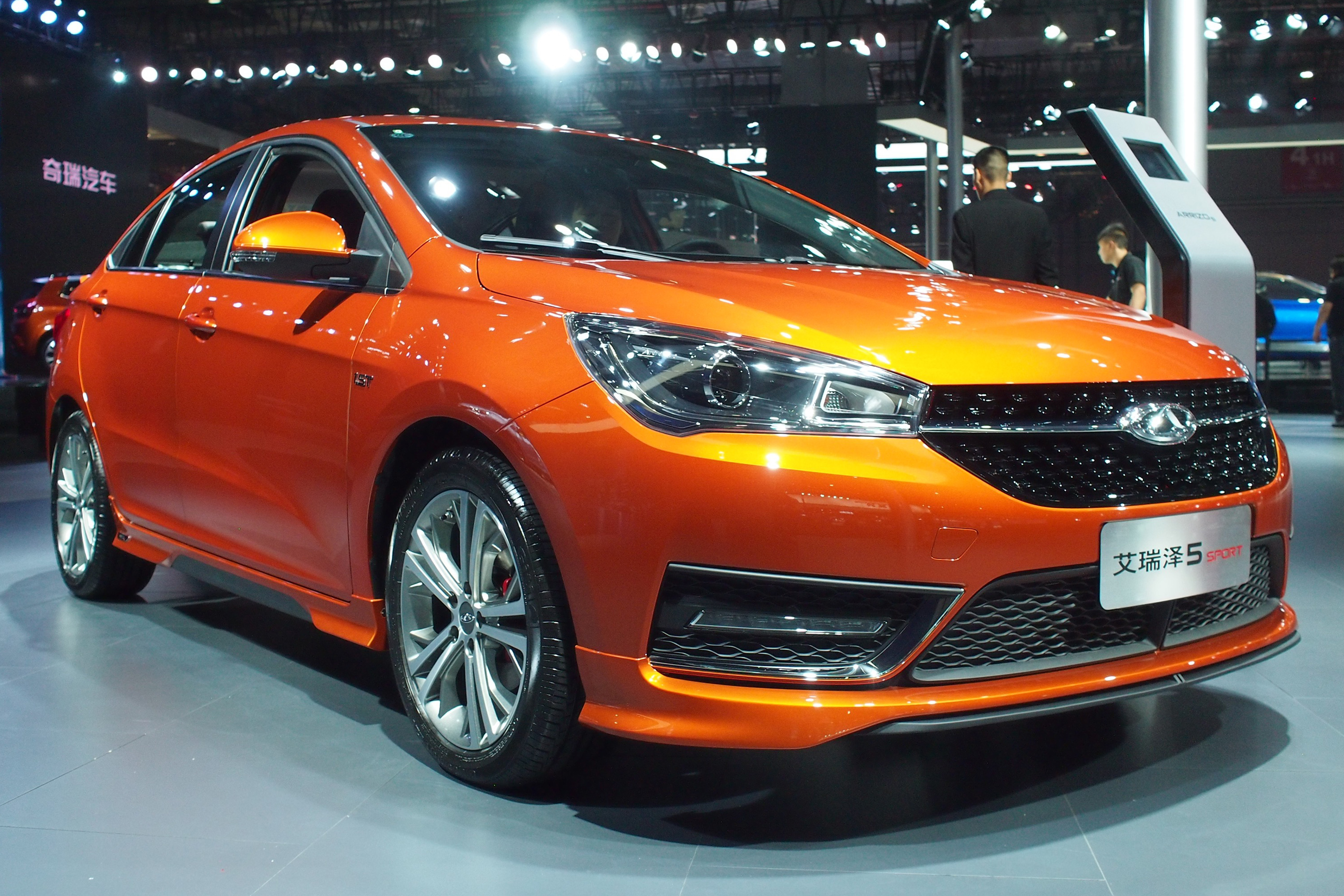
Chery Arrizo 5 Sport front

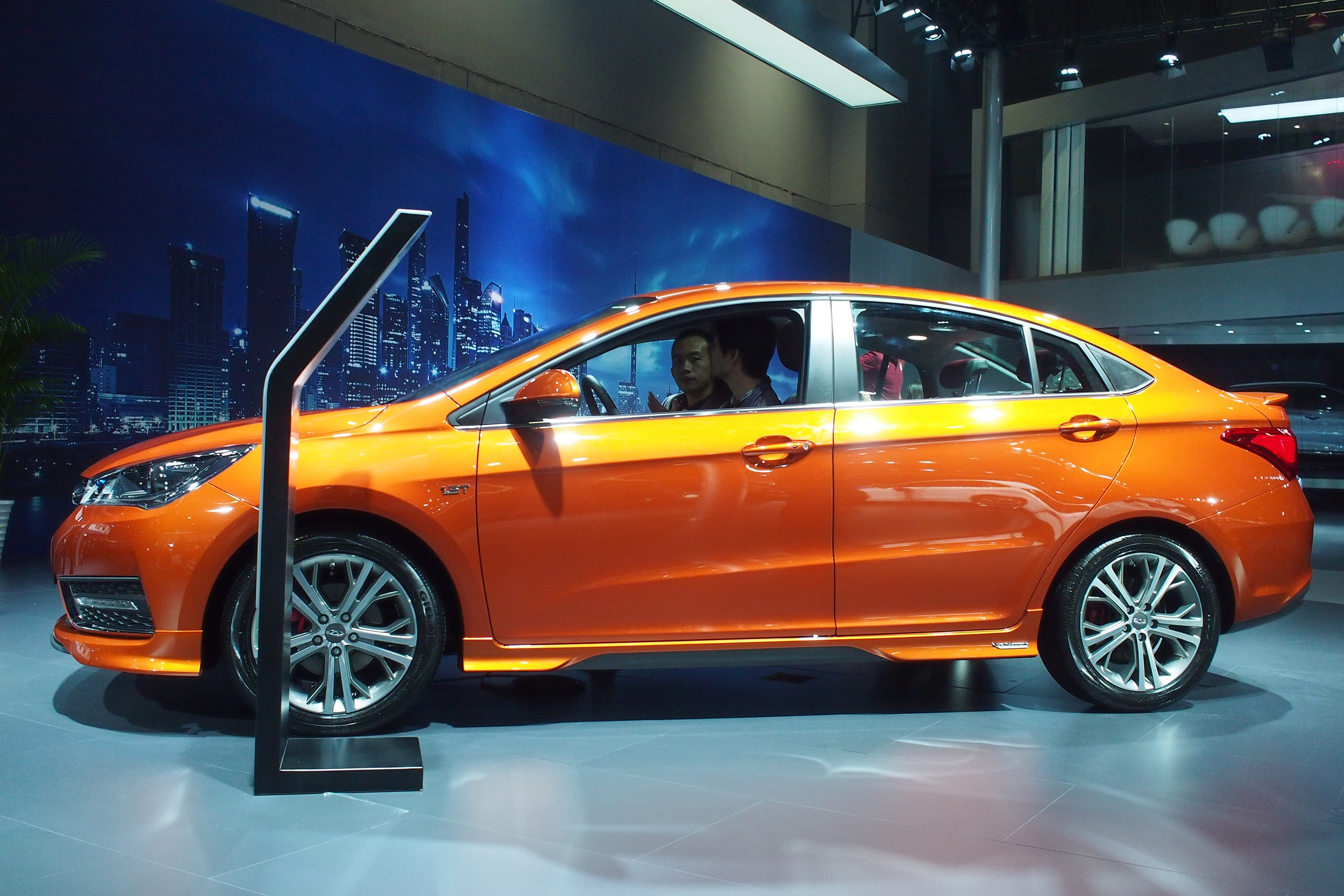
Chery Arrizo 5 Sport side

== Arrizo 5e/e ==
=== Arrizo 5e ===
The Chery Arrizo 5e is an electric car based on the Arrizo 5 sedan. It debuted in June 2017 with a range of 410 kilometers.

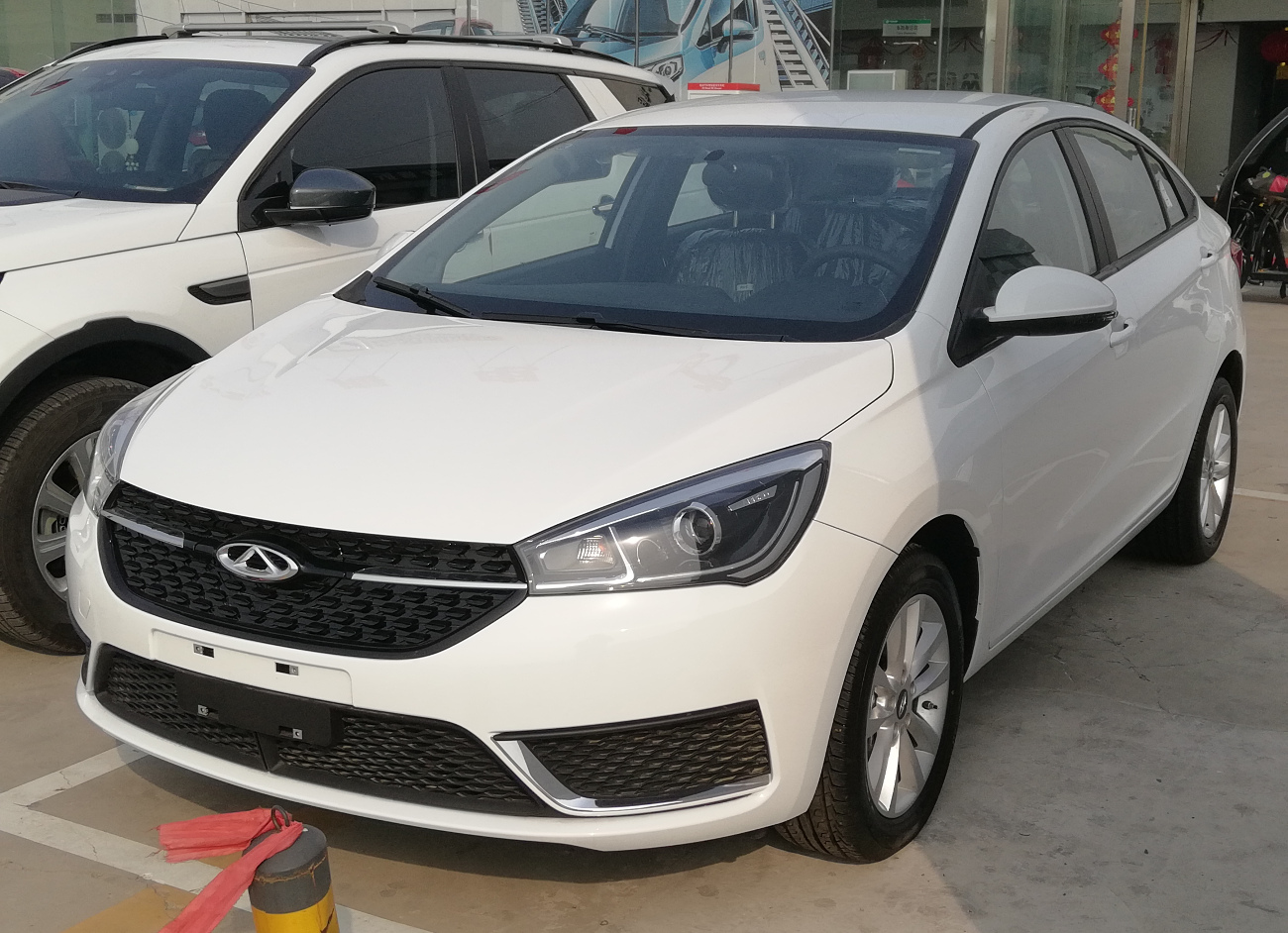
Chery Arrizo 5e front

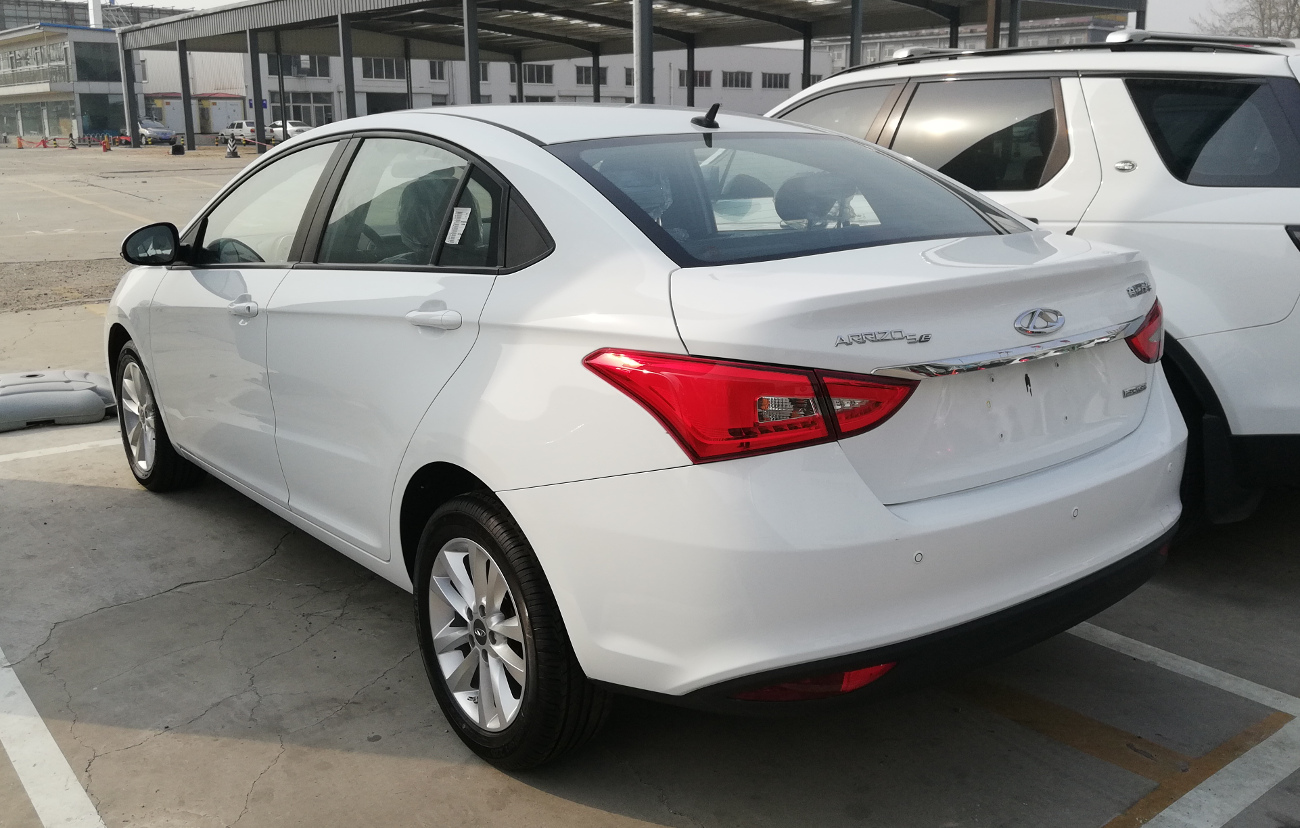
Chery Arrizo 5e rear

=== Arrizo e ===
In 2019 Chery launched the Arrizo e, the facelift version of Arrizo 5e. Compared to the Arrizo 5e, the Arrizo e has a maximum power upgrade of 30 kW to 120 kW and is equipped with a 54.3 kWh ternary lithium battery pack, which is 0.7 kWh more than the 53.6 kWh battery pack in the Arrizo 5e. Its NEDC range reaches 401 kilometers.

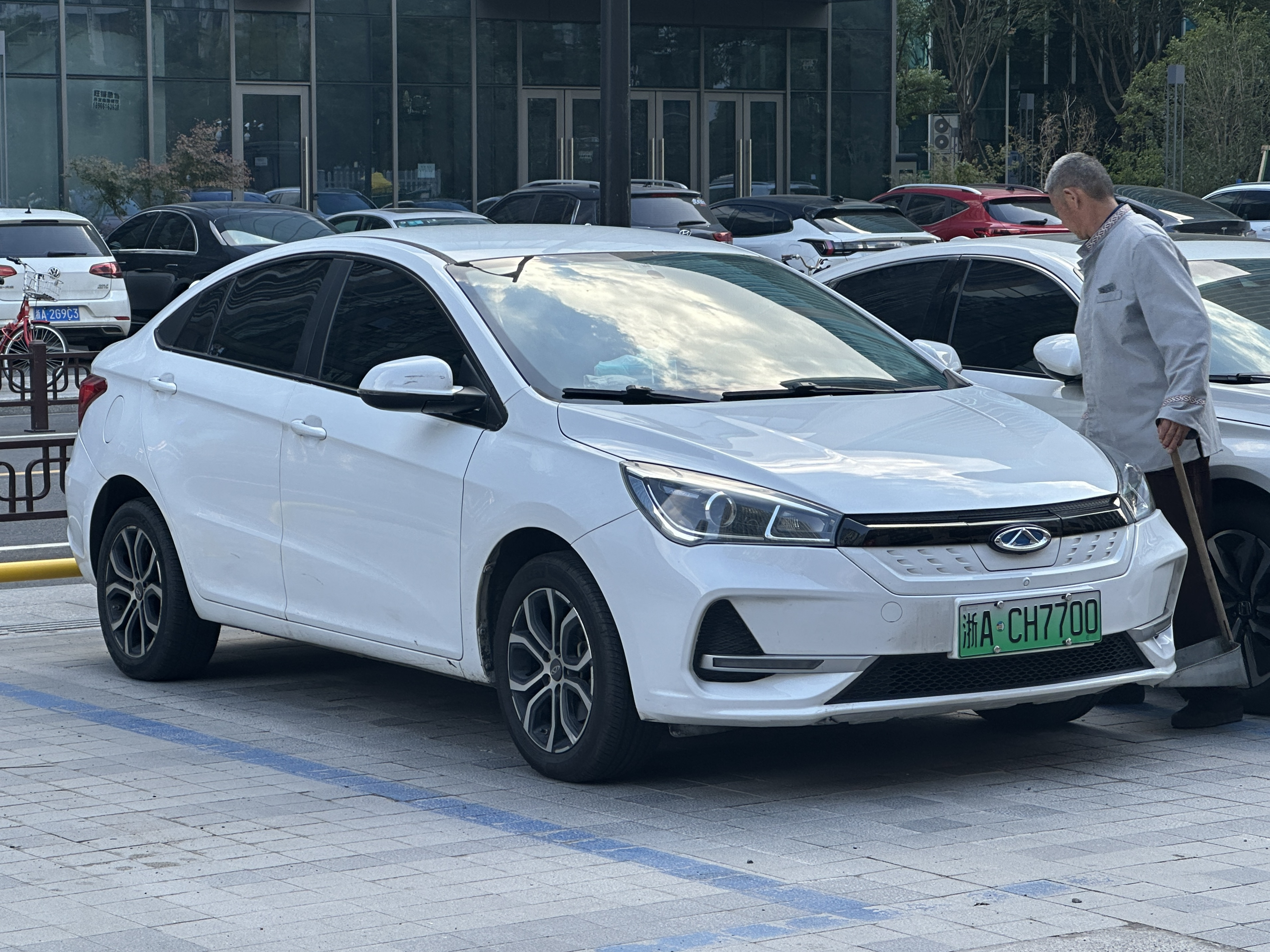
Chery Arrizo e

== Sinogold Junxing ==
A rebadged variant called the Junxing (骏行) was produced under the Sinogold brand following the takeover of the Sinogold brand by Chery due to the previous slow sales and high debt of Sinogold. The model was registered for production in December 2021 with the code name SGA7000BEV3 used for the Sinogold variant. It was reported to be produced from February 2022 with a power output of 120 kW.

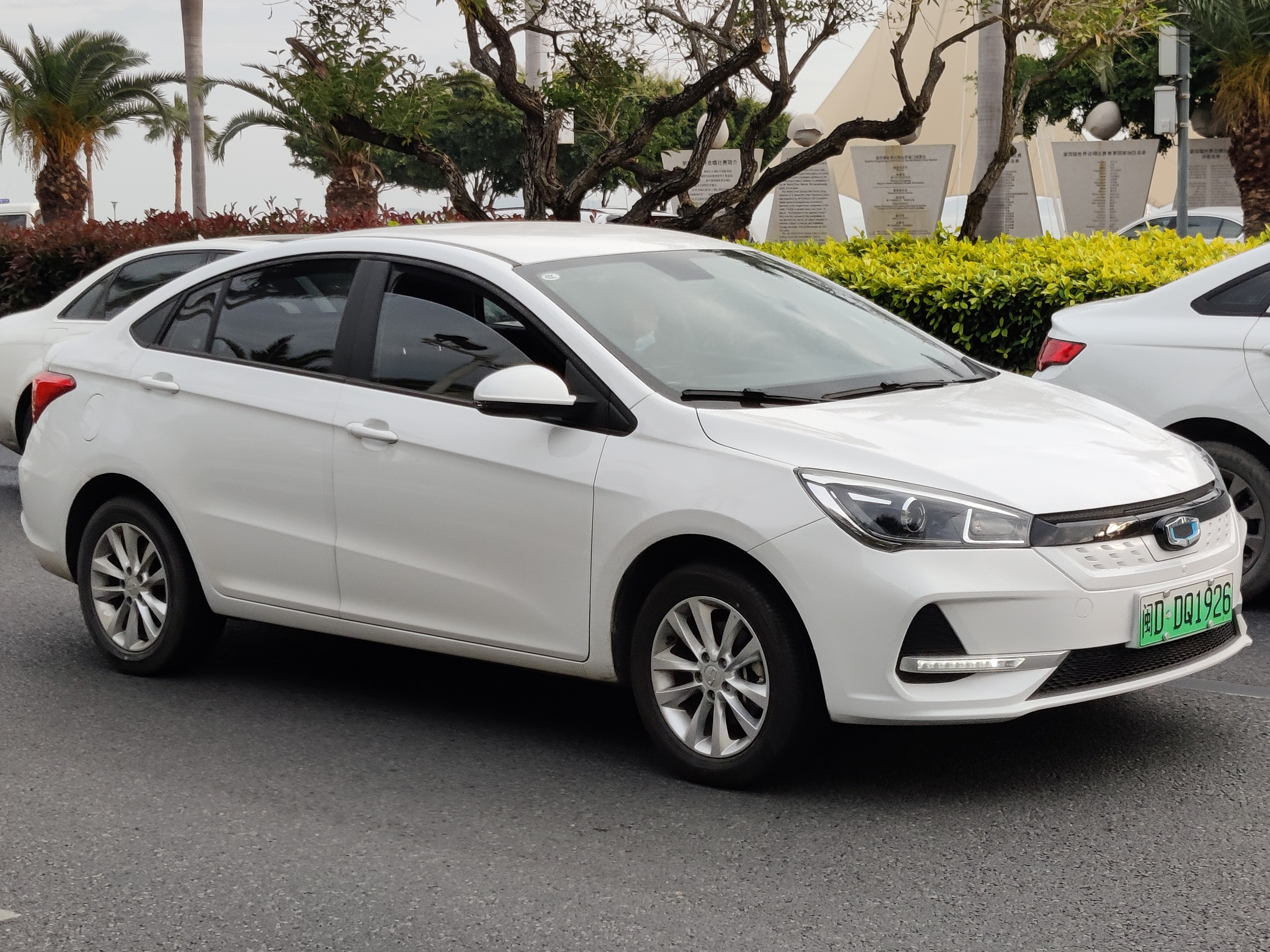
Sinogold Junxing front

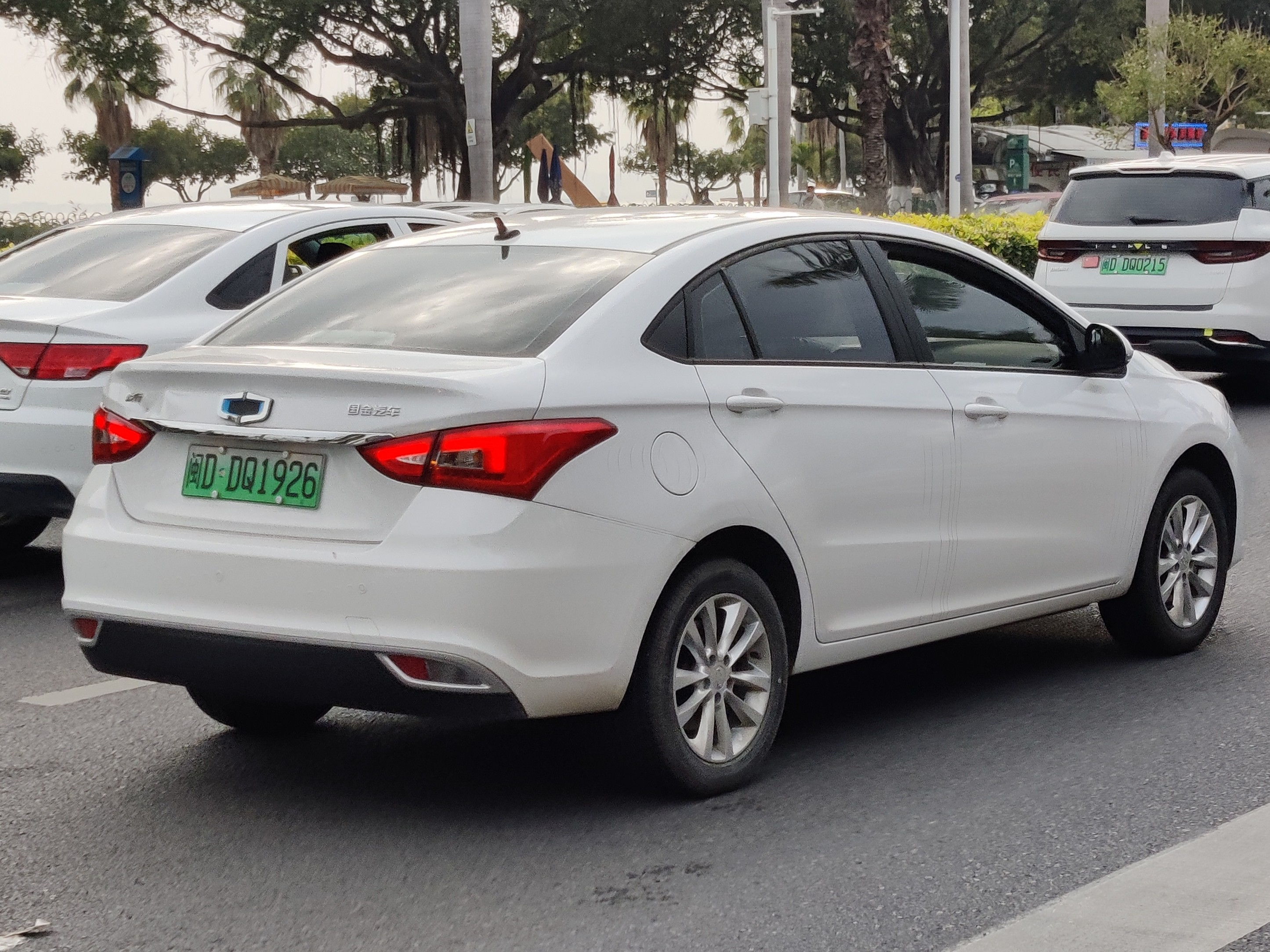
Sinogold Junxing rear
