= Chery Arrizo 8 =

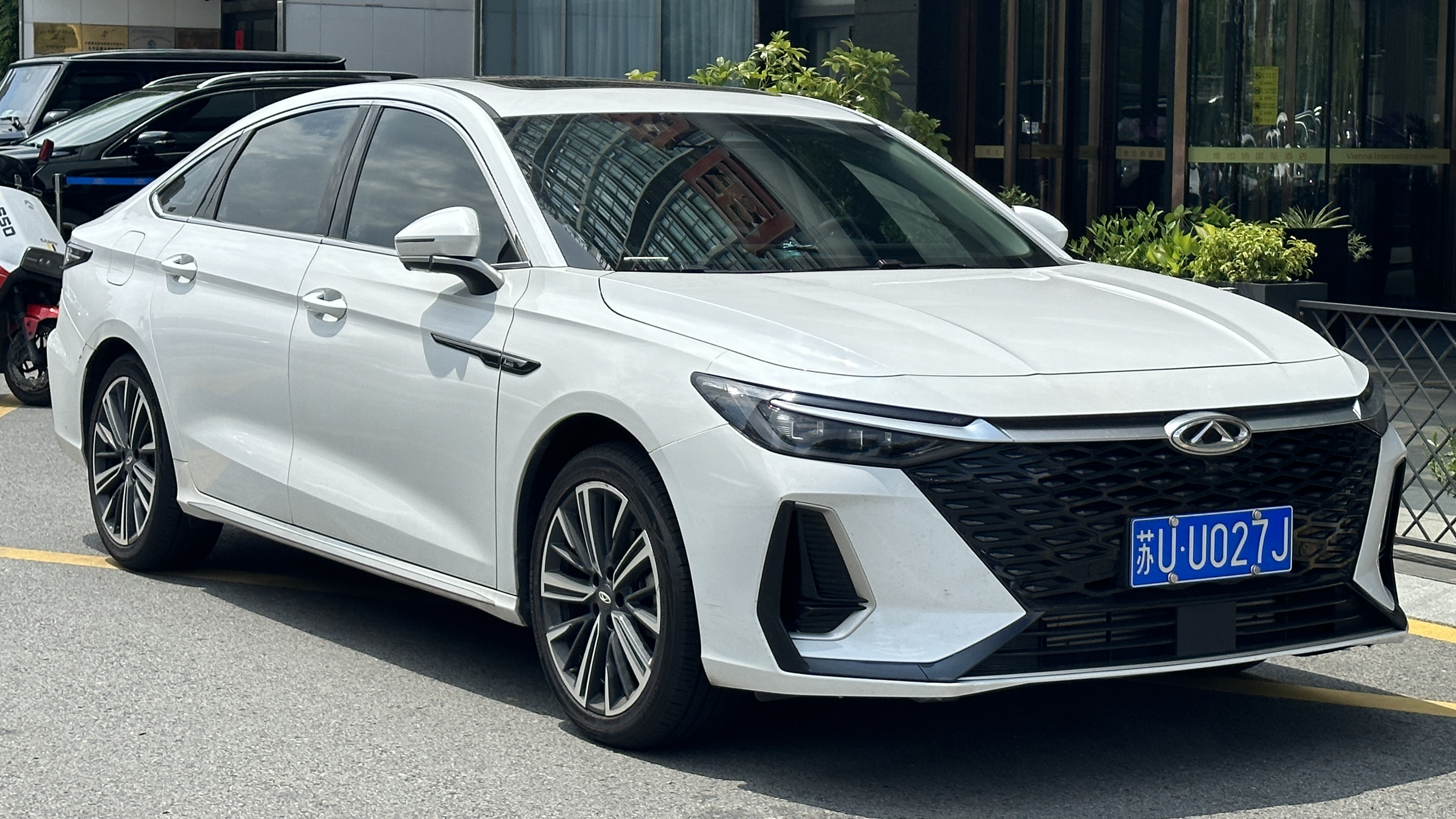

Overview
- Manufacturer: Chery
- Model code: M1E
- Also called: Chery Fulwin A8 (2023–2026); Chery Fulwin A8 Pro (2023); Chery Fulwin A8L (2024–present); Fownix Arrizo 8 (Iran); Fownix Z8 (Iran); Tenet A8 (Russia)
- Production: 2022–present
- Assembly: China: Wuhu, Anhui; Iran: Kerman, Bam

Body and chassis
- Class: Mid-size car (D)
- Body style: 4-door sedan
- Layout: Front-engine, front-wheel-drive
- Platform: M1X

Powertrain
- Engine: Petrol: 1.6 L I4; 2.0 L I4 turbo; Petrol plug-in hybrid: 1.5 L SQRH4J15 I4 (Fulwin A8/A8 Pro/A8L); 1.5 L SQRH4J15 I4 turbo (Fulwin A8/A8 Pro/A8L)
- Electric motor: 201 hp (204 PS; 150 kW) Front-mounted electric motor
- Power output: 194 hp (197 PS; 145 kW) (1.6); 250 hp (253 PS; 186 kW) (2.0 turbo); 302–355 hp (306–360 PS; 225–265 kW) (Fulwin A8/A8 Pro/A8L)
- Transmission: 7-speed dual-clutch; 1-speed DHT (Dedicated Hybrid Transmission)
- Hybrid drivetrain: PHEV (Fulwin A8/A8 Pro/A8L)
- Battery: 18.67 kWh LFP Gotion (PHEV)

Dimensions
- Wheelbase: 2,790 mm (109.8 in)
- Length: 4,780 mm (188.2 in)
- Width: 1,843 mm (72.6 in)
- Height: 1,469 mm (57.8 in)
- Curb weight: 1,428–1,471 kg (3,148.2–3,243.0 lb)

The Chery Arrizo 8 (Chinese: 奇瑞艾瑞泽8; Chinese: 奇瑞艾瑞澤8; pinyin: Qíruì Àiruìzé 8) is a mid-size sedan produced by Chery.

== Overview ==
The Arrizo 8 debuted in April 2022. It was launched on the Chinese market in September 2022.

Power of the Arrizo 8 comes from two engine options, one being a 1.6-litre engine producing 194 hp (145 kW) and 290 N⋅m (210 lbf⋅ft). The second is a 2.0 liter turbo option producing 250 hp (190 kW) and 390 N⋅m (290 lbf⋅ft), and both models are front wheel drive mated to the 7-speed dual-clutch transmission.

Sales began in Russia June 2023, and unlike the younger sedan Chery Arrizo 5 Plus, sold under the name Omoda S5, the model is sold under the original brand and name.

On the Russian market, Chery Arrizo 8 is sold in the following trim levels: Prestige, Ultimate and Ultimate SE.

According to the magazine Autoreview, it is assumed that the model will occupy the segment from which Toyota Camry and Kia K5 have left, although the Chinese sedan is slightly more compact.

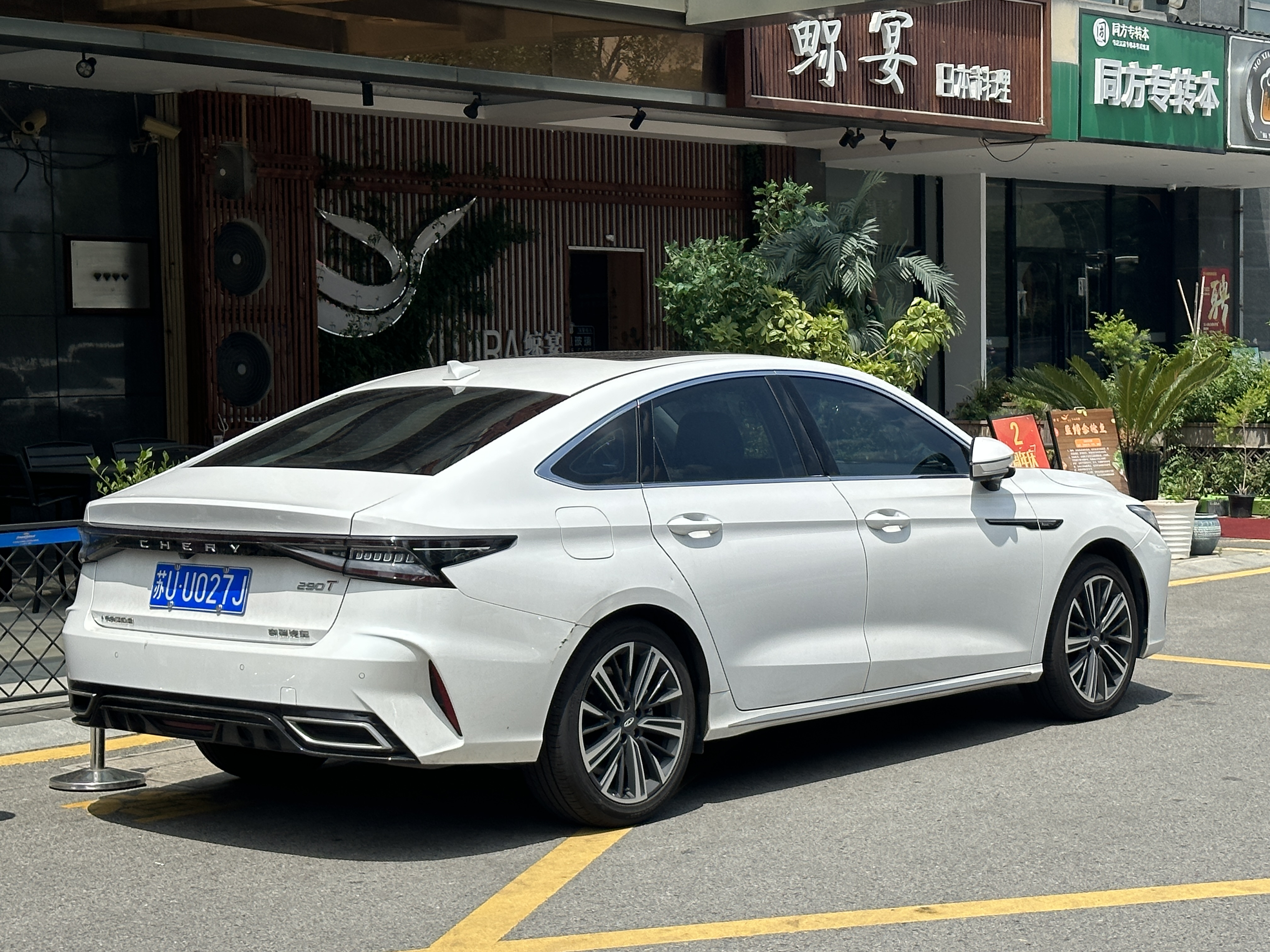
Rear view

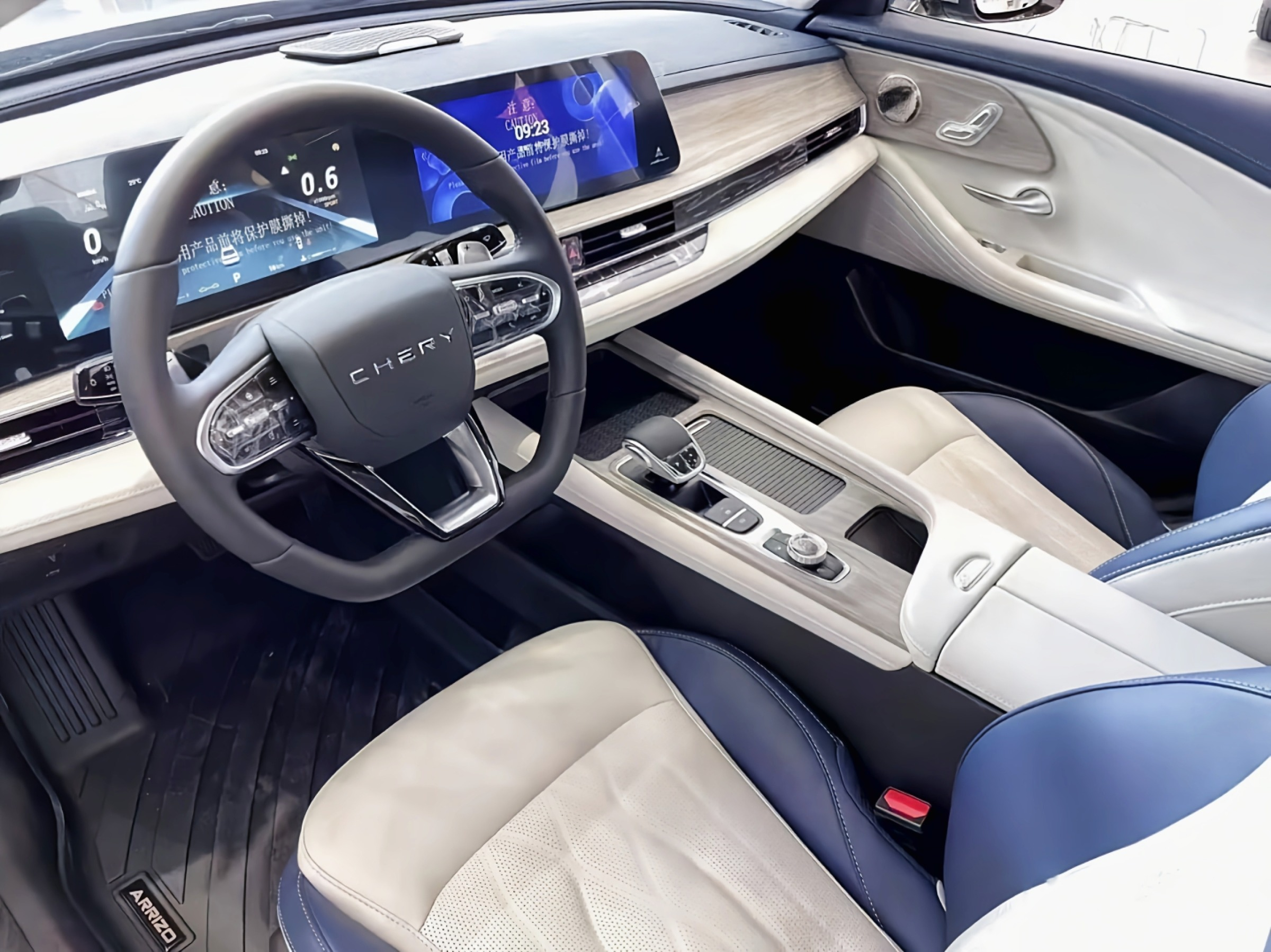
Interior

== Chery Arrizo 8 Pro ==
Based on the Arrizo 8, the Arrizo 8 Pro was launched in April 2025 and is equipped with Qualcomm Snapdragon 8155 chips.

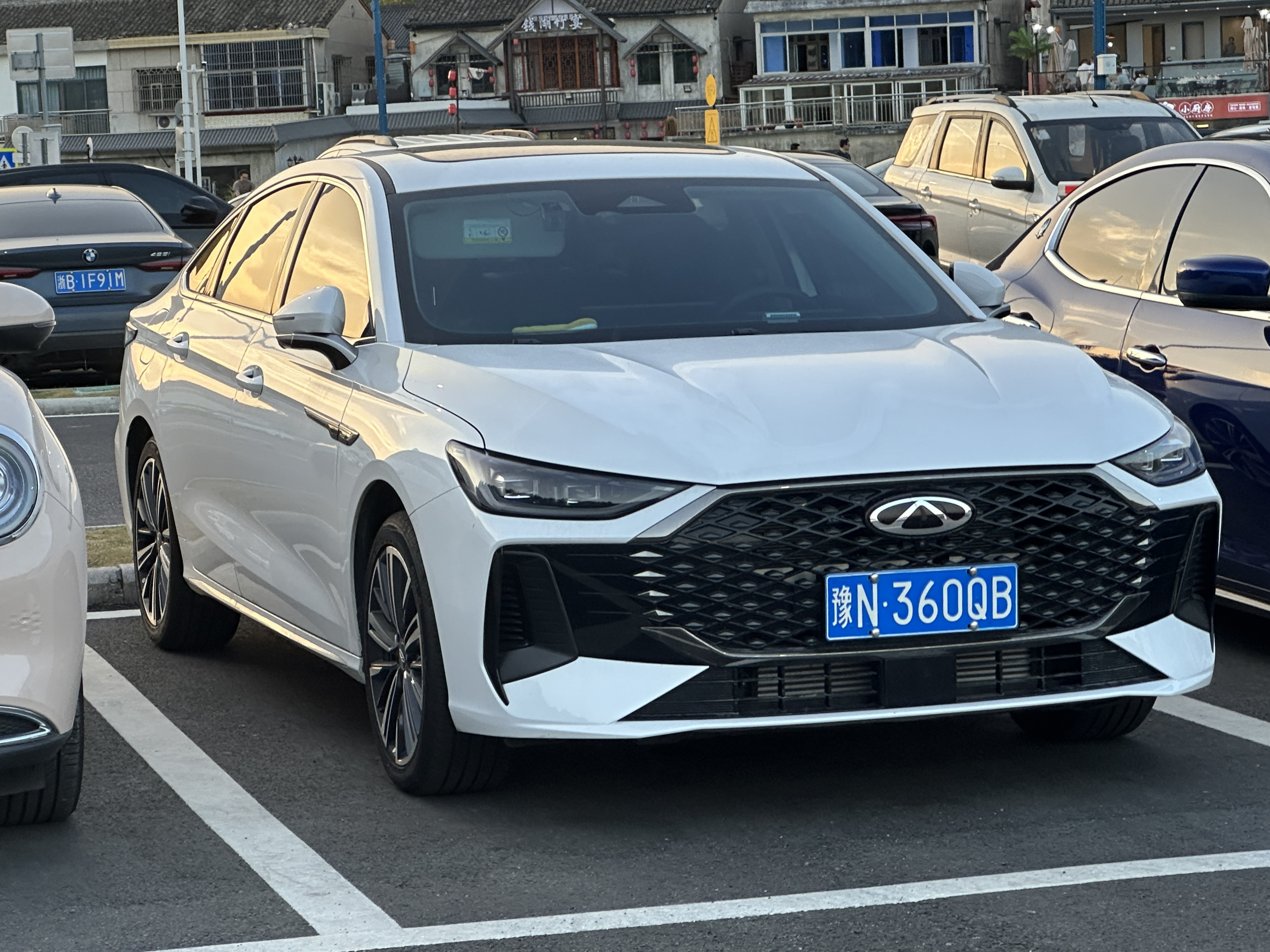
Chery Arrizo 8 Pro

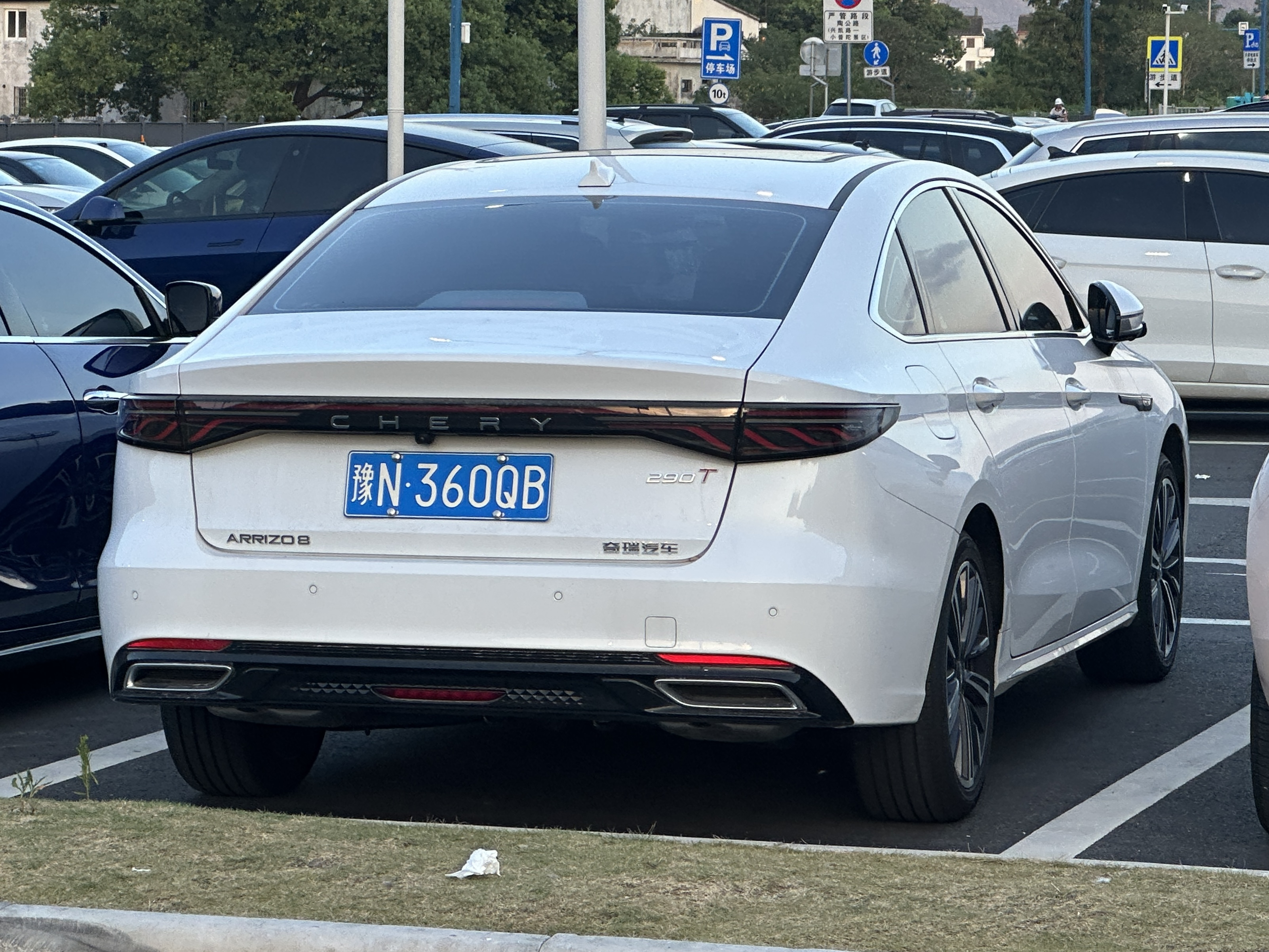
Rear view

=== 2027 (facelift) ===
A facelift for the Arrizo 8 Pro was launched on August 10, 2026 for the 2027 model year, introducing a restyled front bumper and Qualcomm Snapdragon 8255 chips for the infotainment system and Falcon 500 ADAS driving assist.

Chery Arrizo 8 Pro MY2027

== Chery Fulwin A8/A8 Pro/A8L ==
The Chery Arrizo 8 PHEV (codenamed M1E-PHEV) was launched during the 2023 Shanghai Auto Show with the name Arrizo 8 C-DM, while later in October 2023, Chery teased that the Chery Fulwin A8 would be launched, which is in fact the previous Arrizo 8 C-DM model. The Fulwin A8 is equipped with Chery's third generation hybrid system with a 1.5-liter turbo engine developed exclusively for the hybrid system and a 1DHT130 transmission. The pure electric range could exceed 100km, resulting in a combined 1300km range. The WLTC fuel consumption is 4L/100km.

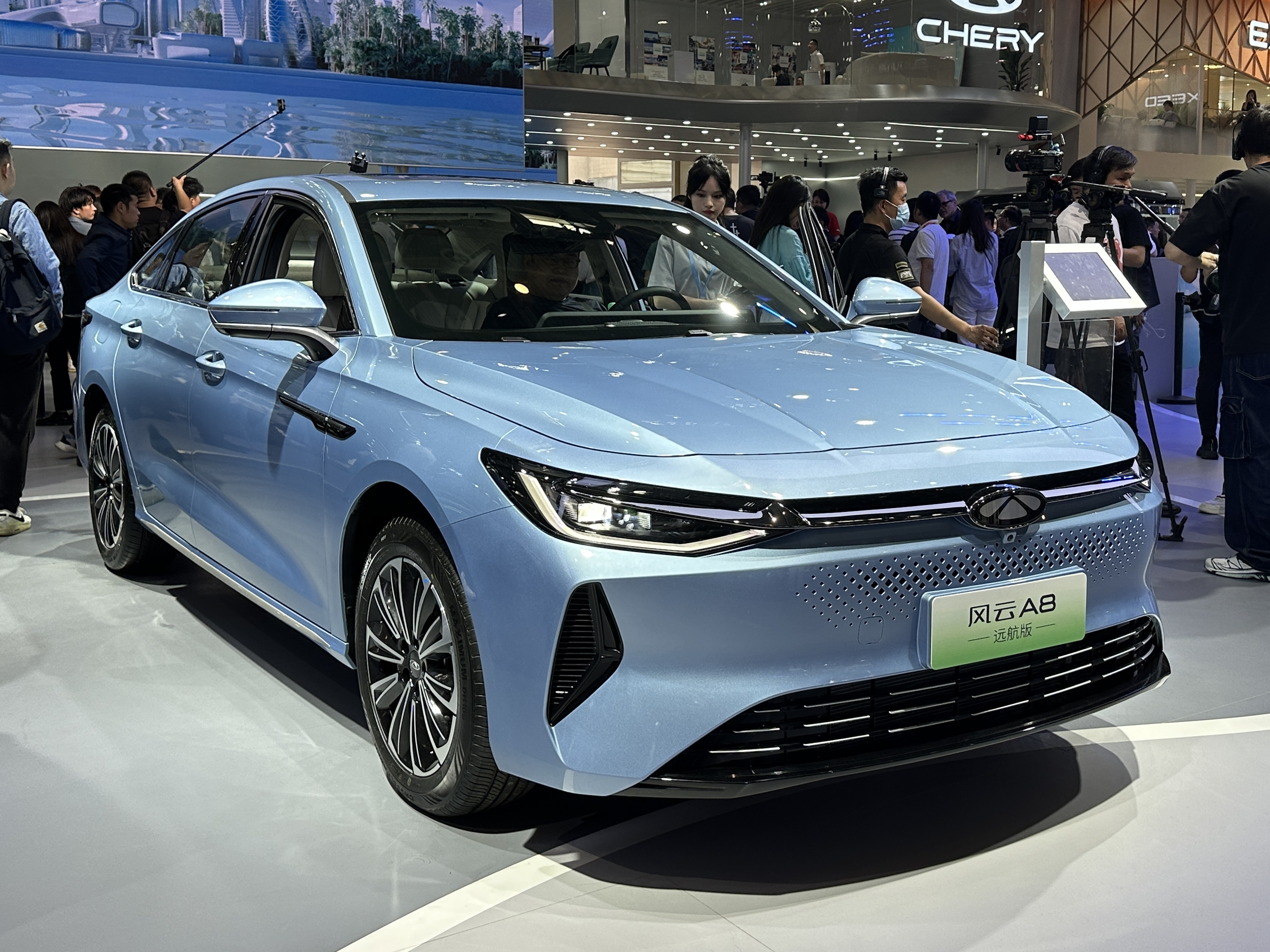
Chery Fulwin A8

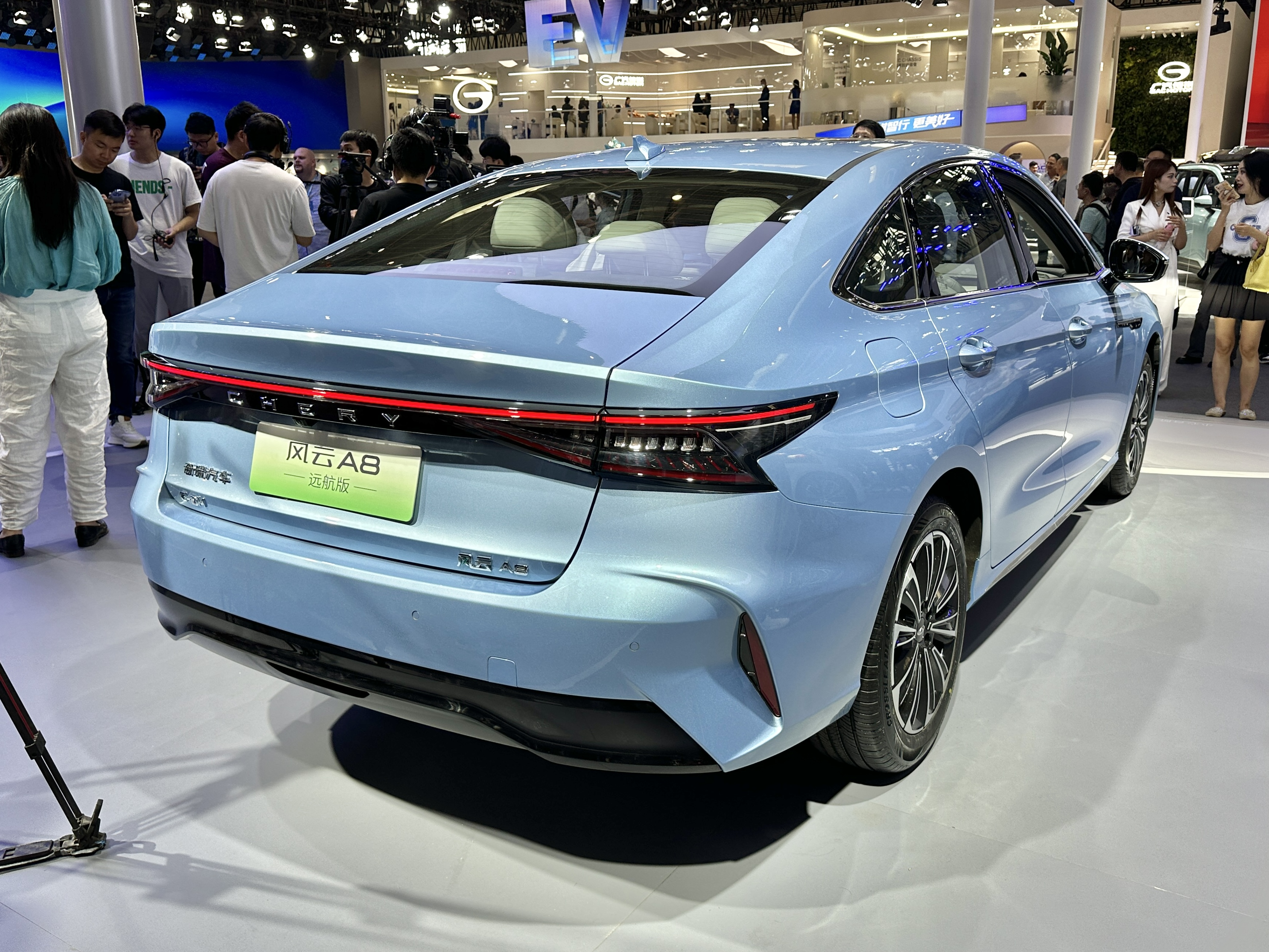
Rear view

The Fulwin A8L C-DM was unveiled during Auto Guangzhou 2024 as a longer C-DM variant of the Fulwin A8. Featuring restyled front and rear bumpers, it is 10mm longer than the regular Fulwin A8. It is powered by Chery’s Kunpeng Super Performance Electric Hybrid C-DM system with a 1.5 liter turbo engine and an electric motor. The C-DM powertrain can produce a maximum engine power output of 115 kW (154 hp) and a peak torque of 220 Nm. The car is equipped with a 18.67 kWh lithium iron phosphate battery pack supplied by Gotion High Tech, capable of a pure electric range of 106 km (CLTC conditions). The top speed of the Fulwin A8L C-DM is 185 km/h.

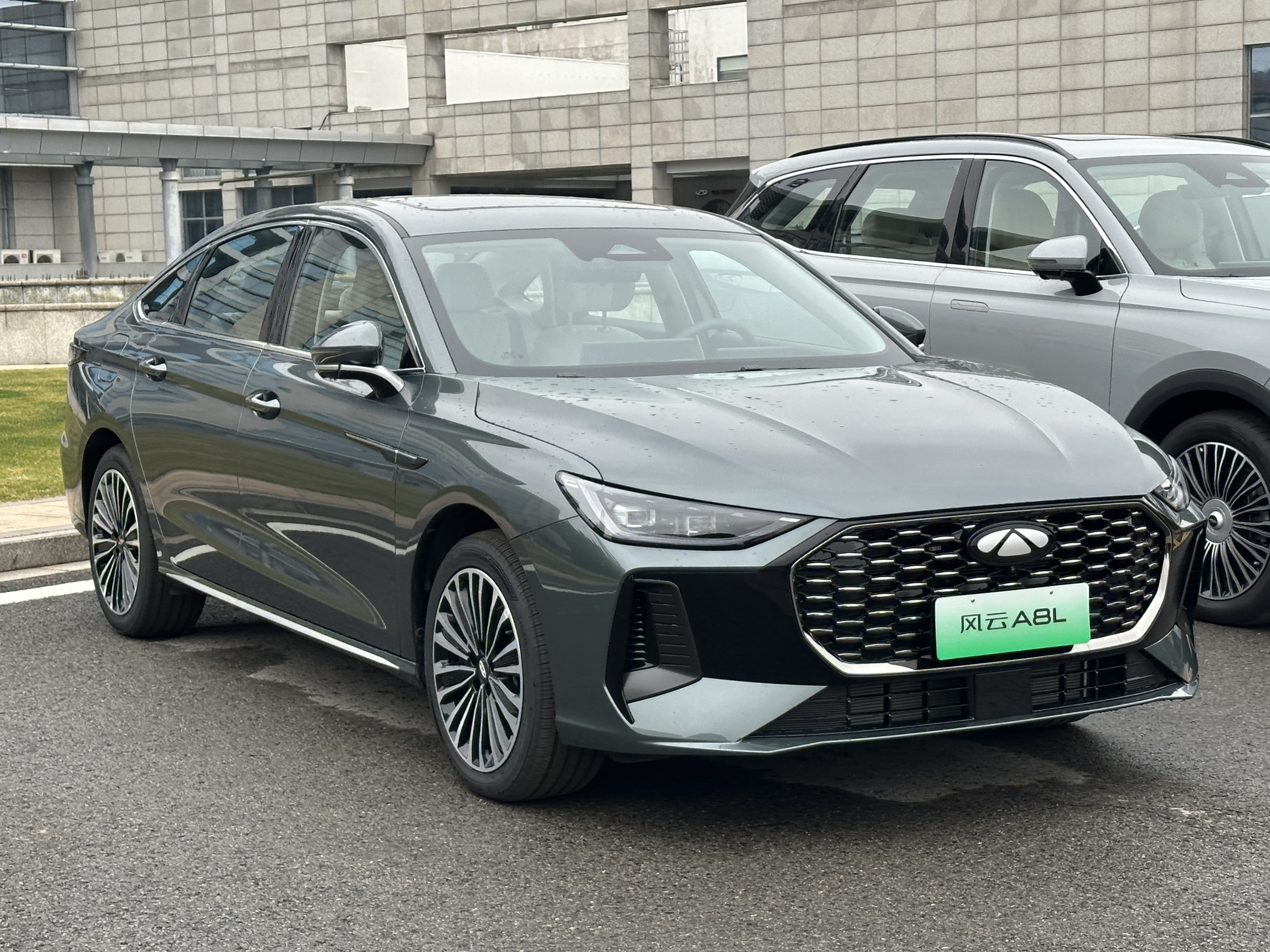
Chery Fulwin A8L

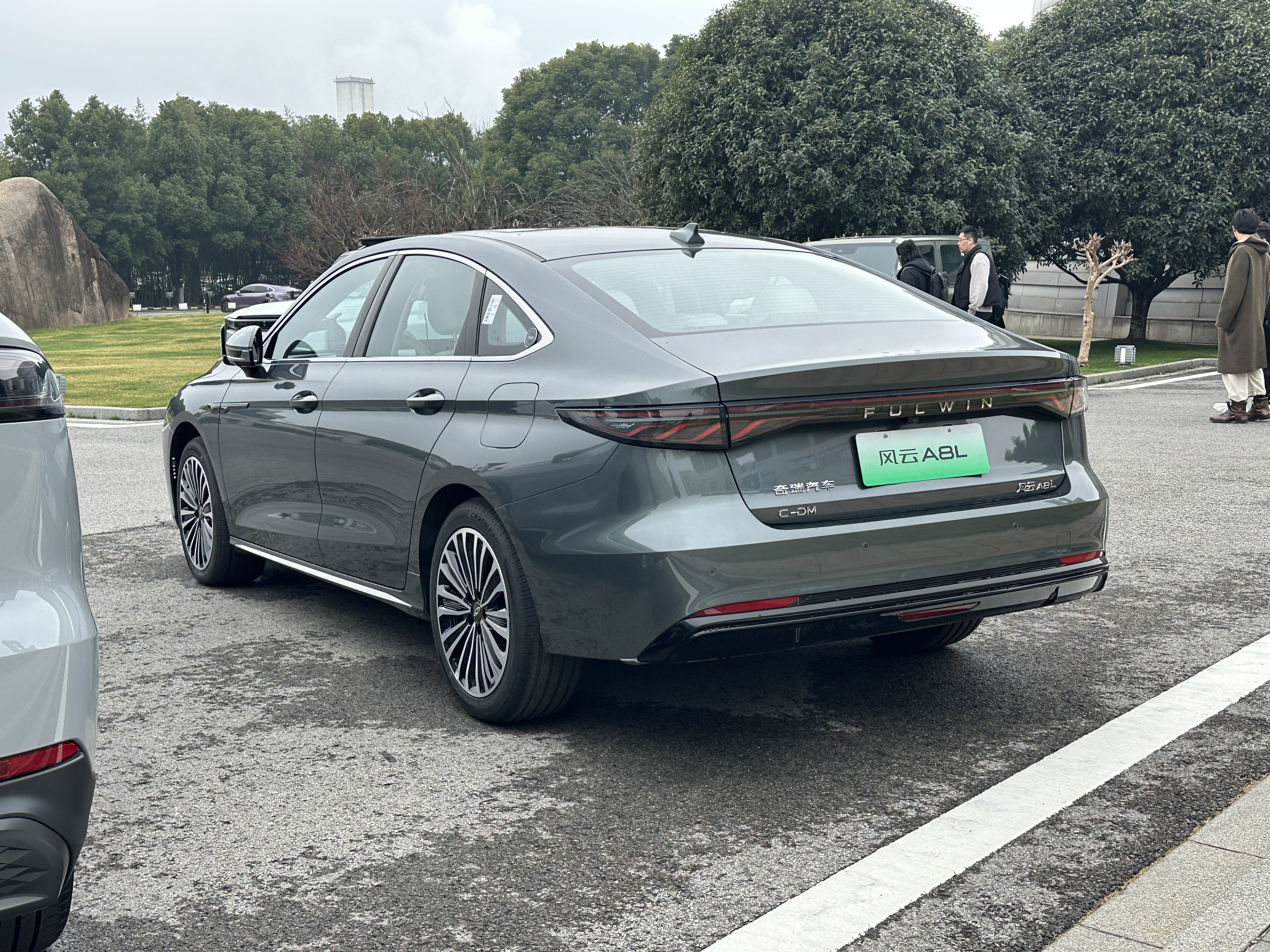
Rear view

== Sales ==
Year	China		Mexico
Year	Arrizo 8	Fulwin A8	Arrizo 8
2023	78,941	—	—
2024	136,500	26,650	503
2025	145,290	17,256	
