= Chery Arrizo 5 Plus =

Chinese automobile

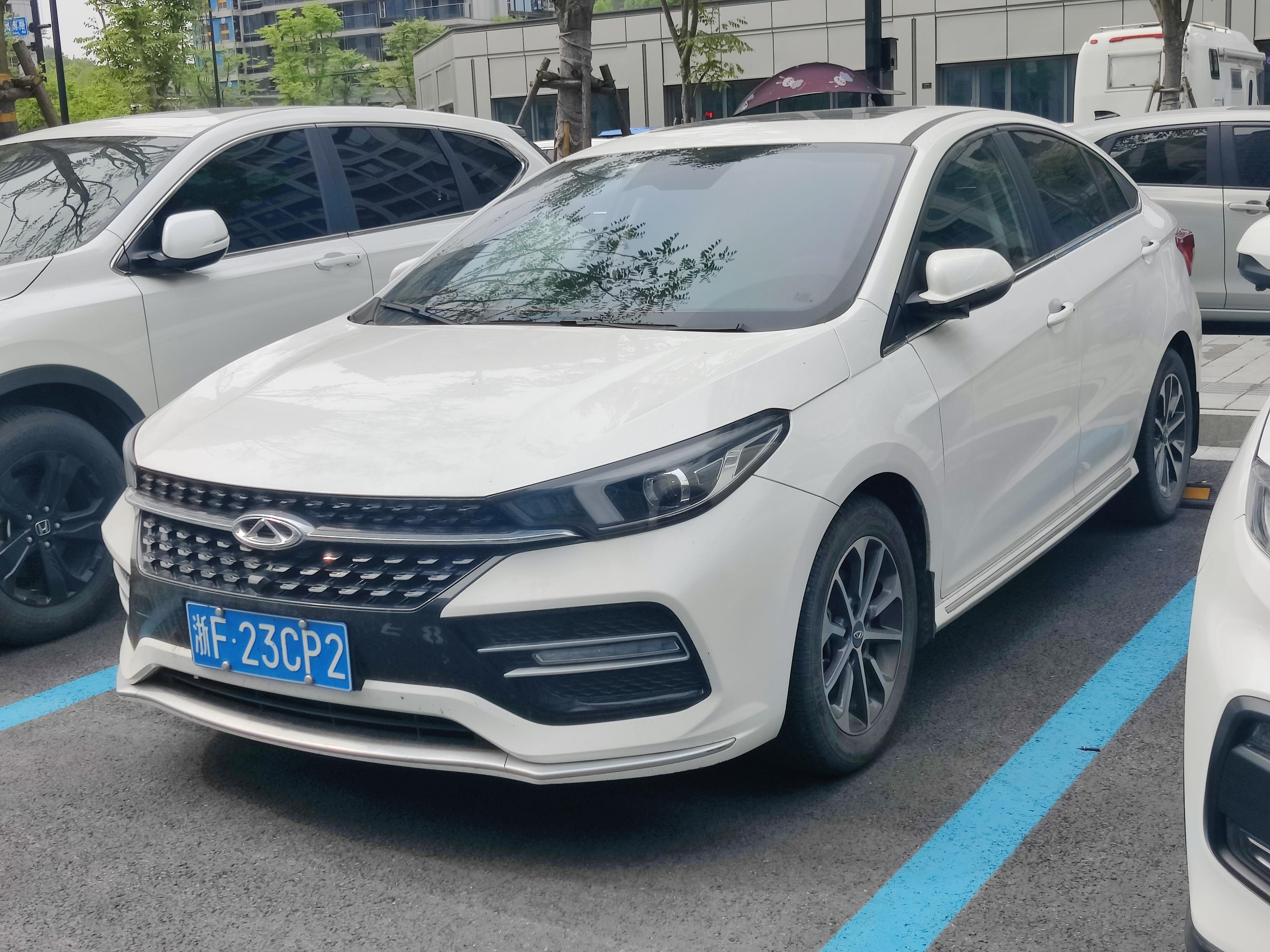

Overview
- Manufacturer: Chery
- Also called: Chery Arrizo 6; Chery Arrizo 6 Pro (facelift); Chery Arrizo GX (pre-facelift); Fownix Arrizo 6 Pro (facelift, Iran); Omoda S5 (Russia and Kazakhstan); Omoda O5 (Mexico)
- Production: 2018–2021 (Arrizo GX); 2021–2025 (Arrizo 5 Plus); 2022–2025 (Arrizo 5 GT); 2019–present (export)
- Assembly: China: Wuhu, Anhui; Brazil: Jacareí (Caoa Chery); Egypt: 6th of October; Iran: Bam, Kerman (MVM)

Body and chassis
- Class: Compact car (C)
- Body style: 4-door sedan
- Layout: Front-engine, front-wheel-drive
- Platform: Chery M1X
- Related: Chery Arrizo 5

Powertrain
- Engine: Petrol: 1.5 L E4G15C I4; 1.5 L E4T15B turbo I4; 1.5 L E4T15C turbo I4; 1.6 L F4J16 turbo I4
- Transmission: 5-speed manual; 7-speed DCT; 9-speed CVT

Dimensions
- Wheelbase: 2,670 mm (105.1 in)
- Length: 4,710 mm (185.4 in); 4,680 mm (184.3 in) (Arrizo 5 Plus)
- Width: 1,825 mm (71.9 in)
- Height: 1,490 mm (58.7 in)
- Curb weight: 1,328–1,365 kg (2,928–3,009 lb); 1,280 kg, 1,298 kg, 1,321 kg, 1,344 kg (Arrizo 5 Plus)

Chronology
- Predecessor: Chery Arrizo 7

The Chery Arrizo 5 Plus (Chinese: 艾瑞泽5 PLUS) or previously the Chery Arrizo GX (Chinese: 艾瑞泽GX) is a compact sedan produced by Chery. The Arrizo GX was based on the Chery Arrizo 5 and debuted during the 2018 Beijing Auto Show. The GX was later renamed to Arrizo 5 Plus for the 2021 facelift right after the Arrizo EX changed the name back to the previous name, Arrizo 5. A performance variant called the Arrizo 5 GT was launched in September 2022.

== Chery Arrizo GX ==
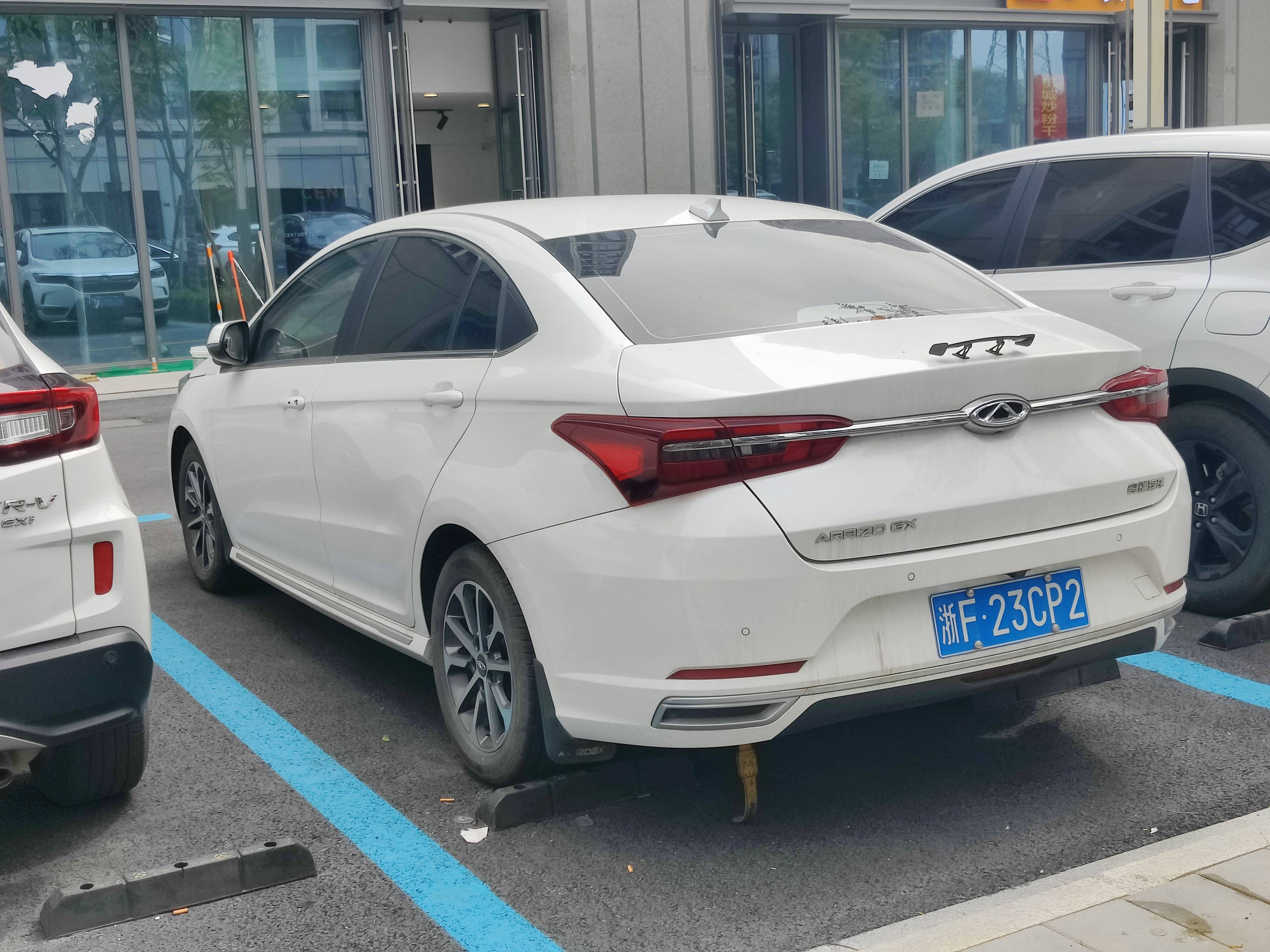
Chery Arrizo GX rear

Launched in 2018, the Chery Arrizo GX (codeproject M1D) was formerly known as the Chery Arrizo 6 during development phase, and was planned to be positioned between the Arrizo 5 and the Arrizo 7. Prices of the Arrizo GX ranges from 79,900 to 106,900 yuan. The introduction of the car took place at the 2018 Beijing Motor Show in April 2018 while sales in China started in October 2018. From 2019, it is also exported to the Middle East and Latin America where it is sold as the Chery Arrizo 6.

The Arrizo GX is a compact sedan (C-Segment) which is positioned within the manufacturer's range between the compact Arrizo 5 and the mid-size Arrizo 7. It was developed based on the platform of the Arrizo 5 and share the same basic chassis and the same skeleton as the bodywork but has additional engines and an unprecedented exterior and interior design.

Aesthetically, it was differentiated from the lower priced compact Arrizo 5 by introducing the updated design language with the muzzle characterized by the large black X-shaped grille that extends from the lights to the lower bumpers, the headlamps and the fog lights are LED, also the tailgate rear with a chronograph band that runs horizontally. The doors remained the same as in the Arrizo 5 but the chrome frames along the arch of the windows were changed. The drag coefficient has been reduced to 0.28.

=== Interior ===
The cockpit is completely new both in the dashboard skeleton and in the setting that eliminates almost all the buttons leaving only the essential one, the main controls are part of the new 7-inch infotainment system with touchscreen with integrated navigation, 360 degree video camera, radio and 4G internet connectivity, Bluetooth, Wi-Fi, Apple CarPlay and Android Auto. The climate controls are integrated into a second 8-inch LCD touchscreen. The instrumentation is mixed with two circular dials for speedometer and tachometer and in the middle a 9-inch LCD screen that can reproduce the navigator or other multimedia system functions such as the rear view camera.

=== Chassis ===
the car is based on a modular chassis (M1X platform). The front brakes are a ventilated disc and the rear ones a drum brakes. All models are available with six airbags, ABS and EBD, stability and traction control as standard. The body was made with high resistance steel of 1600 MPa in the frontal area and in the A and B pillars, and with programmed deformation steel in the rest of the skeleton.

== Powertrain ==
The engine range at the 2018 debut consisted of a China-V standard Acteco SQRE4T15B 1.5T engine producing 108 kilowatts (145 hp; 147 PS) at 5500 rpm and peak torque of 210Nm at 1750-4000 rpm, combined with a manual 5-speed gearbox or simulated 9 speed CVT gearbox. It continued to be sold in 2019 alongside the updated version.

In 2019, an updated version appeared, using an updated China-VI standard SQRE4T15C 1.5T engine, producing 115 kilowatts (154 hp; 156 PS) at 5500 rpm and peak torque of 230Nm at 1750-4000 rpm, paired with a simulated 9 speed CVT. This version was later renamed to Arrizo GX Pro.

== Chery Arrizo GX Pro ==
In June 2019, Chery introduced the Arrizo GX Pro naming.

It was rumoured to come with a choice of either the old 1.5T engine or a new 1.6-litre Acteco TGDI 16-valve engine, with 145 kilowatts (194 hp; 197 PS), both combined with a new seven-speed dual clutch automatic transmission by Getrag.

However, it did not appear and the name was eventually used for the China-VI engine versions of the 2019 Arrizo GX.

== Chery Arrizo GX Champion Edition ==
In September 2019 Chery introduced the Arrizo GX Champion Edition with similar styling to the GX and GX Pro, at a price of 75,900-91,900 yuan.

It comes with 1.5L SQRE4G15C engine generating 85 kW (116Ps) at 6150 rpm and peak torque of 143N.m at 4000 rpm, matching a simulated 7-speed CVT gearbox, similar to the Chery Arrizo 5 Pro.

As of 2022, it is the only variant using the Arrizo GX name still on sale.

== Chery Arrizo 5 Plus ==
The Arrizo 5 Plus is the facelift model of the GX. The Arrizo 5 Plus was introduced in 2021 in two different variants, namely Xiao Ai and Ozawa. The two different variants features different front face designs while the two variants have exactly the same design on the side view, rear, and interior. This car in the Iranian market is called Fownix Arrizo 6 Pro, and in Brazilian market is called Chery Arrizo 6 Pro.

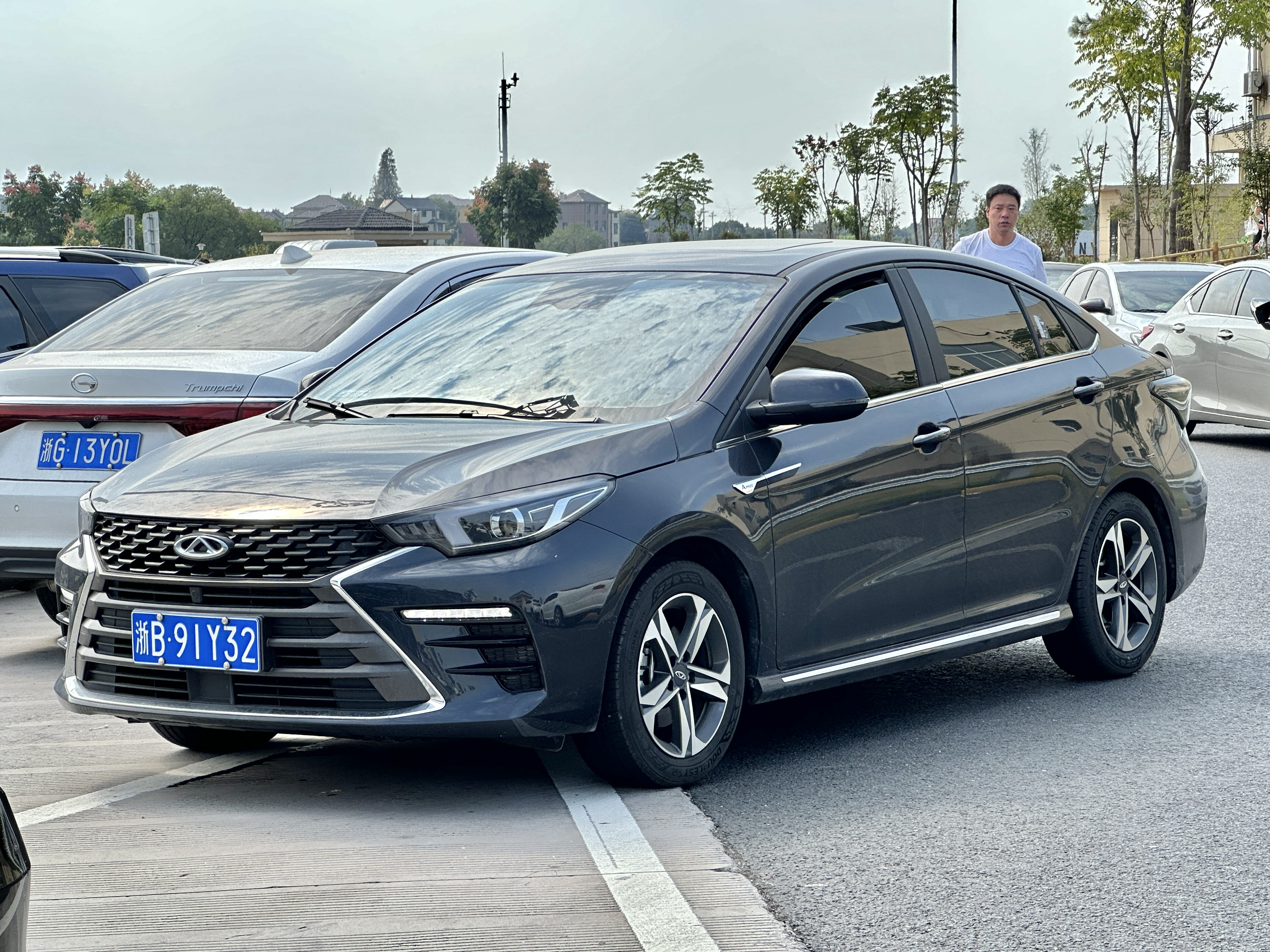
Chery Arrizo 5 Plus Xiao Ai front

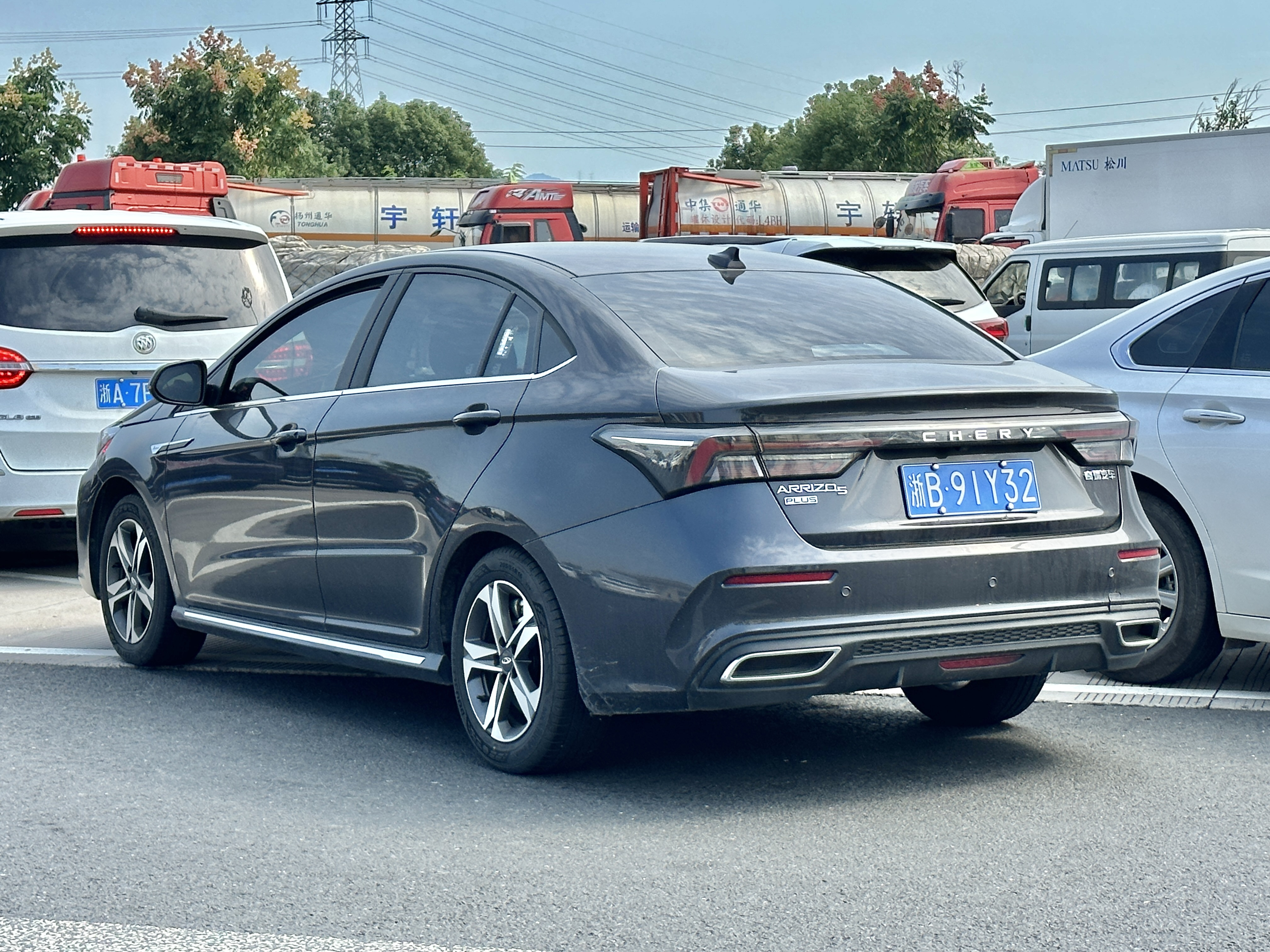
Chery Arrizo 5 Plus Xiao Ai rear

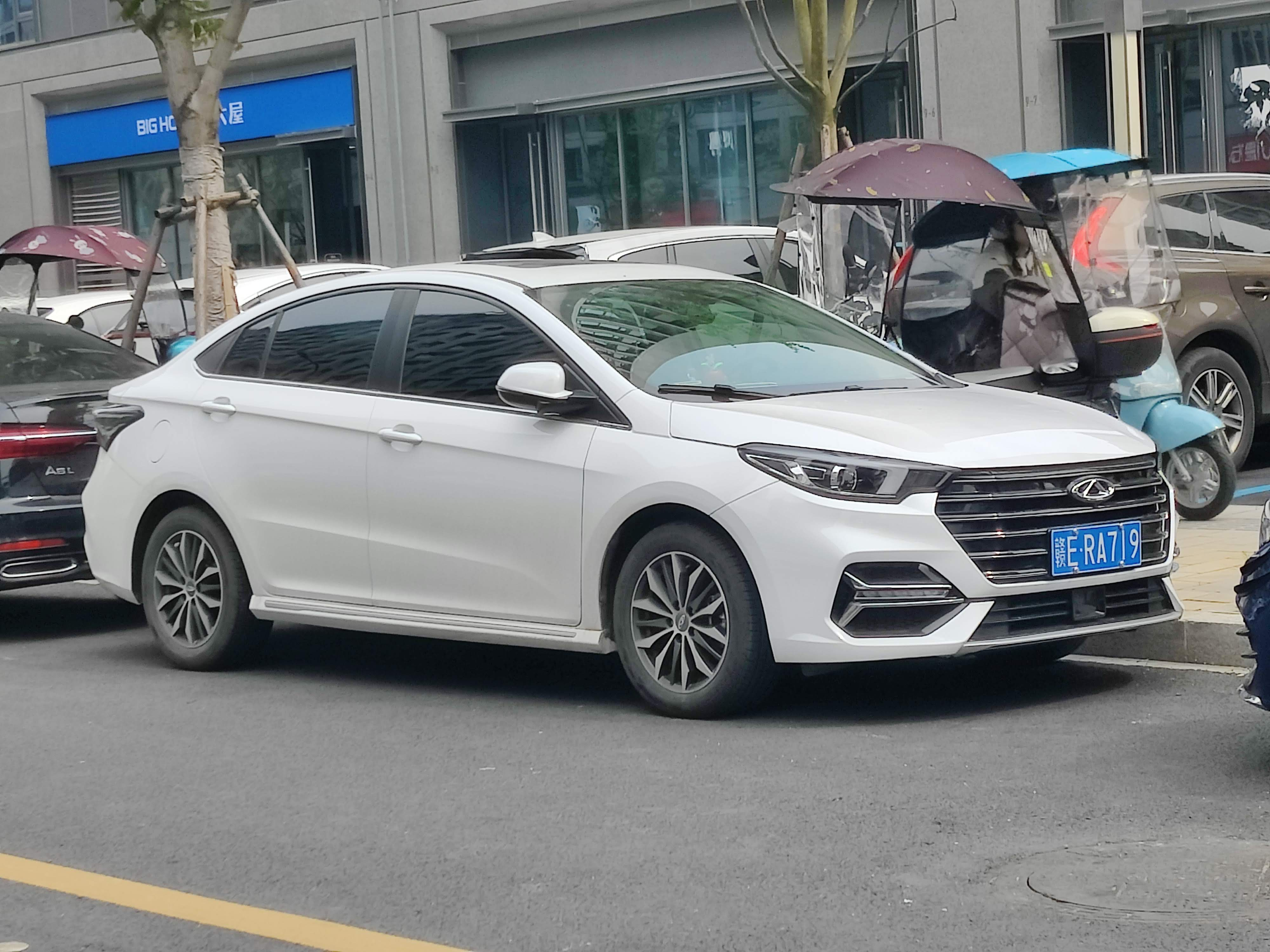
Chery Arrizo 5 Plus Ozawa front

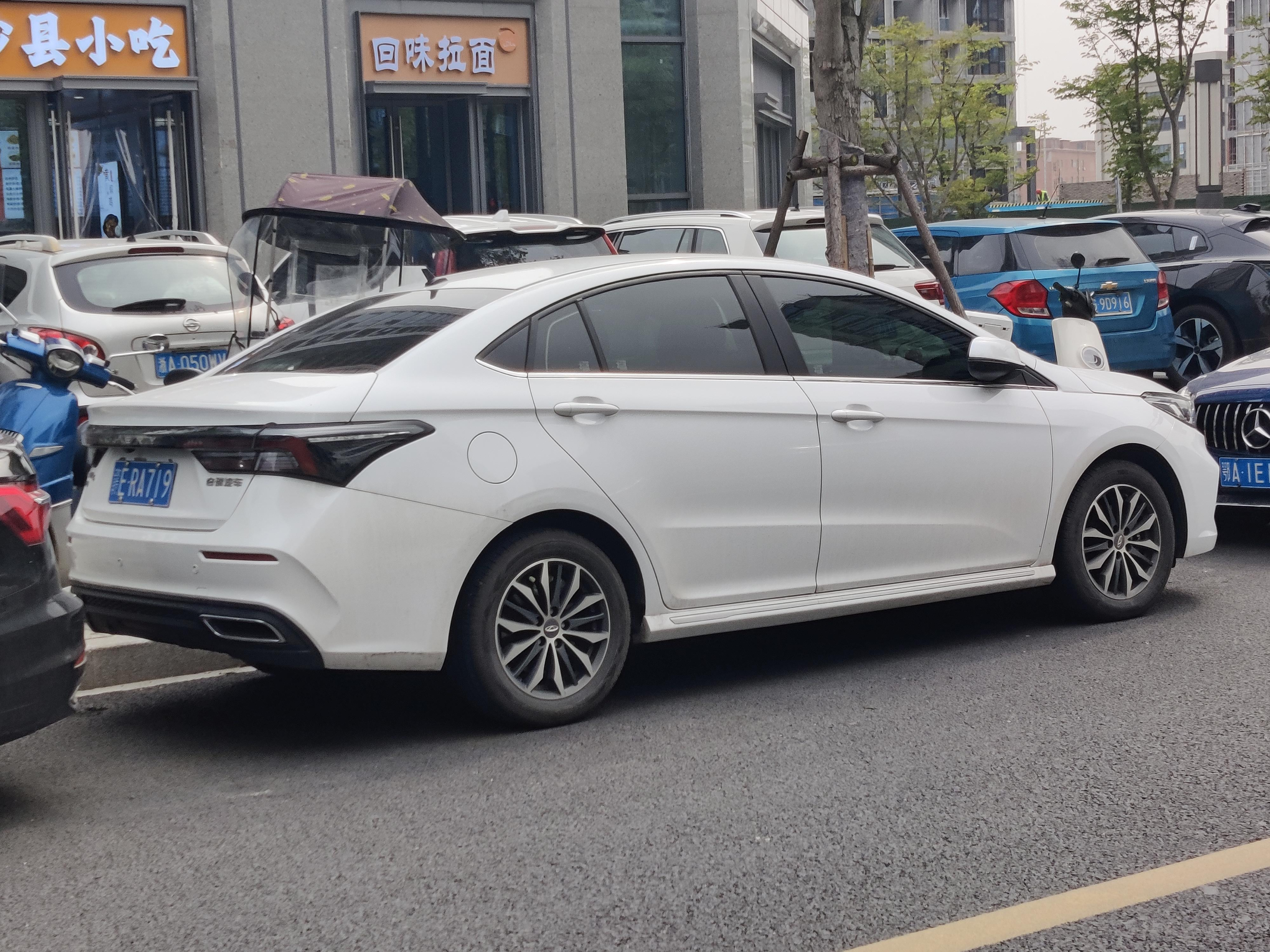
Chery Arrizo 5 Plus Ozawa rear

== Powertrain ==
The engine for the Arrizo 5 Plus is a SQRE4G15C 1.5-litre naturally aspirated petrol engine and a SQRE4T15C 1.5-litre petrol turbo engine developing 156 horsepower (116 kW; 158 PS)., paired with either a 5 speed manual or simulated 9 speed CVT.

== Chery Arrizo 5 GT ==
Based on the Arrizo 5 Plus, a performance variant called the Arrizo 5 GT was launched in September 2022 and is equipped with the Kunpeng SQRF4J16 1.6-litre four-cylinder turbocharged engine, with a maximum power of 197 Ps at 5500 rpm and torque of 290Nm at 2000-4000 rpm. The Arrizo 5 GT will be equipped with a 7-speed wet dual-clutch transmission. Acceleration from 0 to 100 km/h takes 6 seconds.

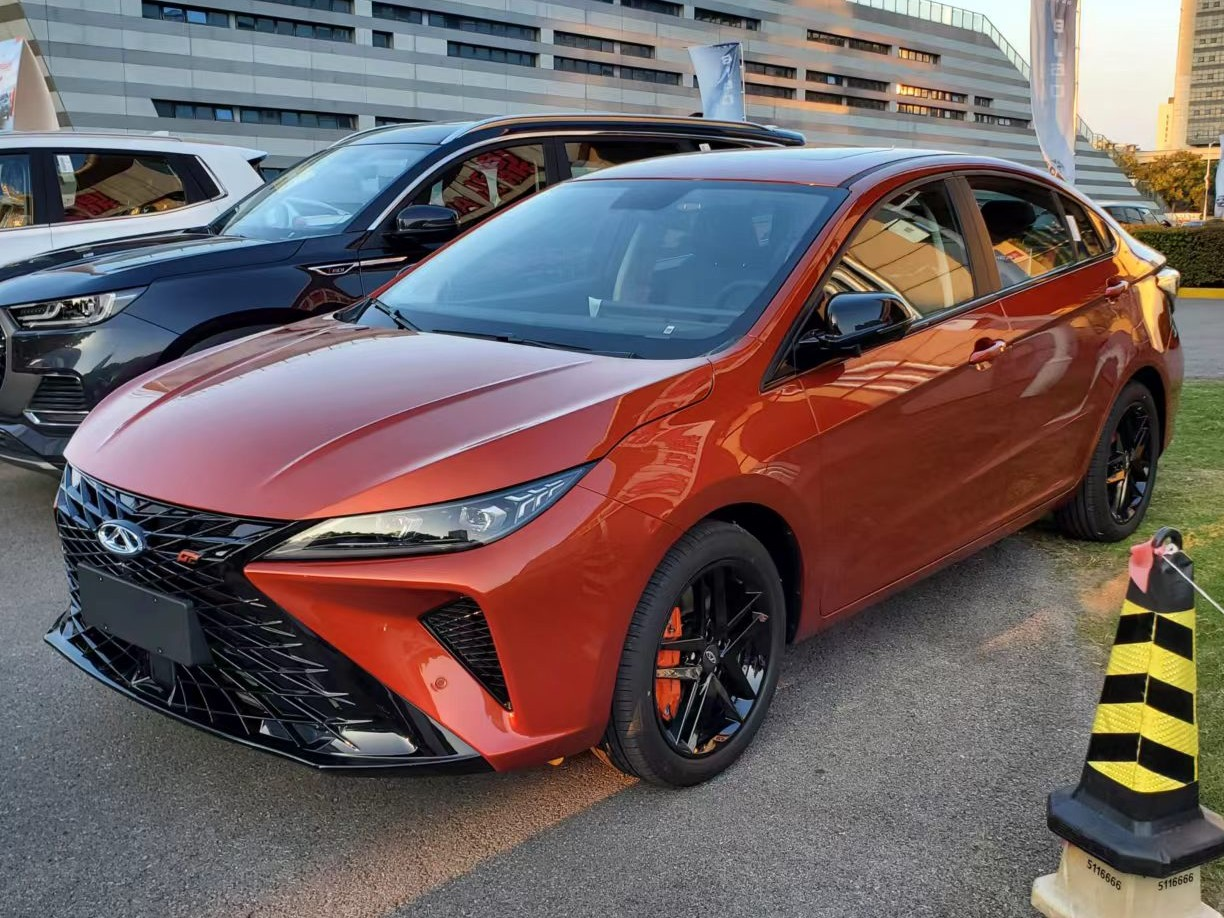
Chery Arrizo 5 GT
