= Chery Tansuo 06 =

Compact crossover SUV

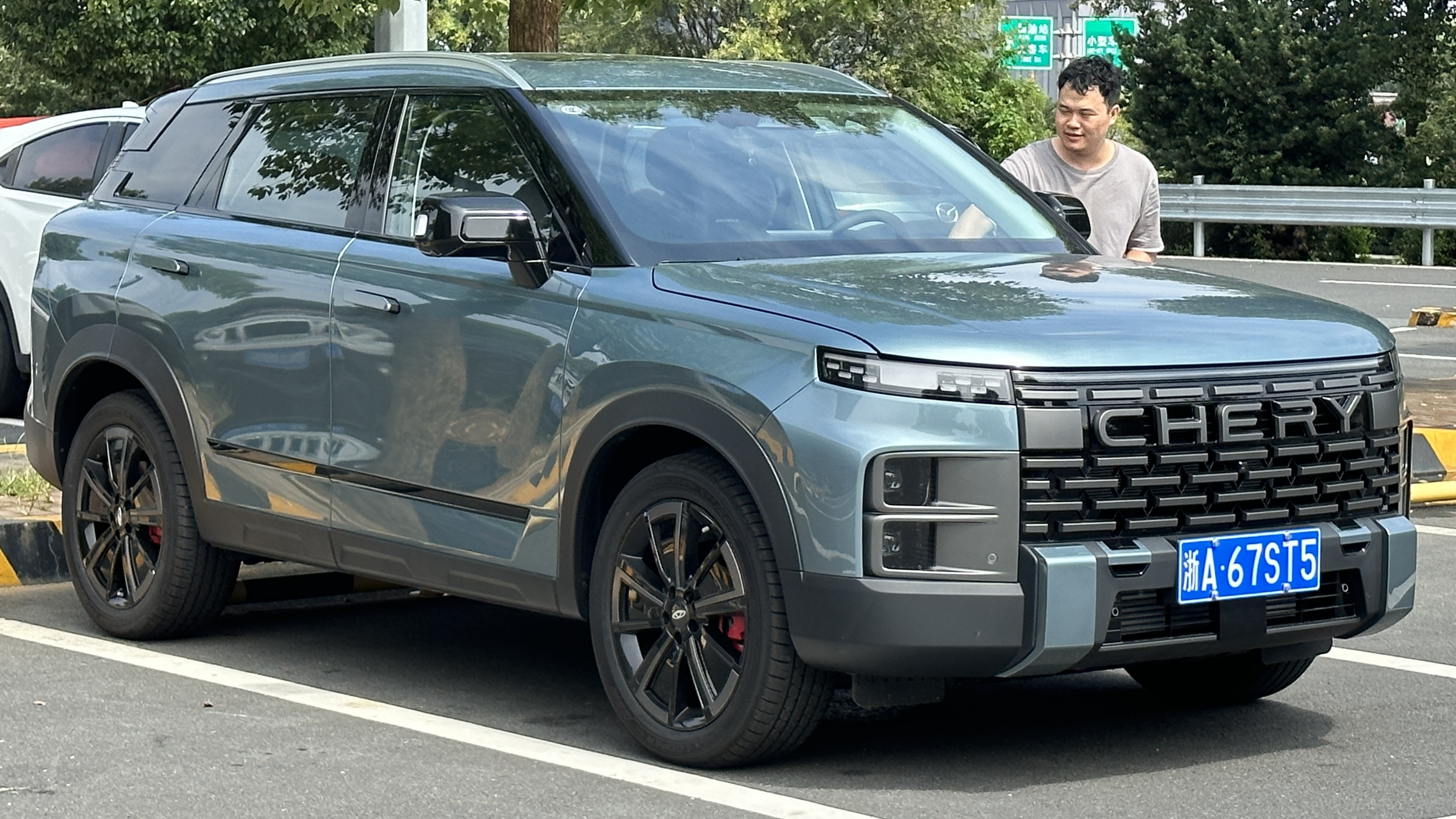
- 2023 Chery Tansuo 06

Overview
- Manufacturer: Chery
- Model code: T1EJ
- Also called: Chery Fulwin T6 (China, 2024–2025); Chery Tiggo 7 High Energy (China, 2024–present); Jaecoo J7/7; Lucano L7 (Iran)
- Production: 2023–2026 (Tansuo 06); 2024–present (Tiggo 7 High Energy)
- Assembly: China: Dalian, Liaoning

Body and chassis
- Class: Compact crossover SUV (C)
- Body style: 5-door SUV
- Layout: Front-engine, front-wheel-drive; Front-engine, all-wheel-drive
- Platform: T1X
- Related: Chery Tiggo 7; Chery Tiggo 8; Jaecoo J5; Omoda C5

Powertrain
- Engine: Petrol: 1.6 L Kunpeng SQRF4J16 turbo I4; Petrol plug-in hybrid: 1.5 L SQRH4J15 turbo I4
- Electric motor: Permanent magnet synchronous
- Transmission: 7-speed dual-clutch; Dedicated hybrid transmission (DHT) (PHEV)
- Hybrid drivetrain: Plug-in hybrid
- Battery: 18.32 kWh FinDreams LFP (C-DM)
- Electric range: WLTP: 88 km (55 mi) (SHS)

Dimensions
- Wheelbase: 2,650 mm (104.3 in)
- Length: 4,501–4,552 mm (177.2–179.2 in)
- Width: 1,865 mm (73.4 in)
- Height: 1,670 mm (65.7 in)

The Chery Tansuo 06 (Chinese: 奇瑞探索06; pinyin: Qíruì Tànsuǒ 06), also known as Chery Tiggo 7 High Energy (Chinese: 奇瑞瑞虎7 高能版; pinyin: Qíruì Ruìhǔ 7 Gāonéng Bǎn) or the PHEV variant Chery Fulwin T6 (Chinese: 奇瑞风云T6; pinyin: Qíruì Fēngyún T6) is a compact crossover SUV produced by Chery since 2023. The vehicle is rebadged as Jaecoo brand outside China.

== Overview ==
The vehicle was first introduced during the Auto Shanghai 2023 as the Chery TJ-1 C-DM prototype. It went on sale in China in August 2023 as the Chery Tansuo 06.

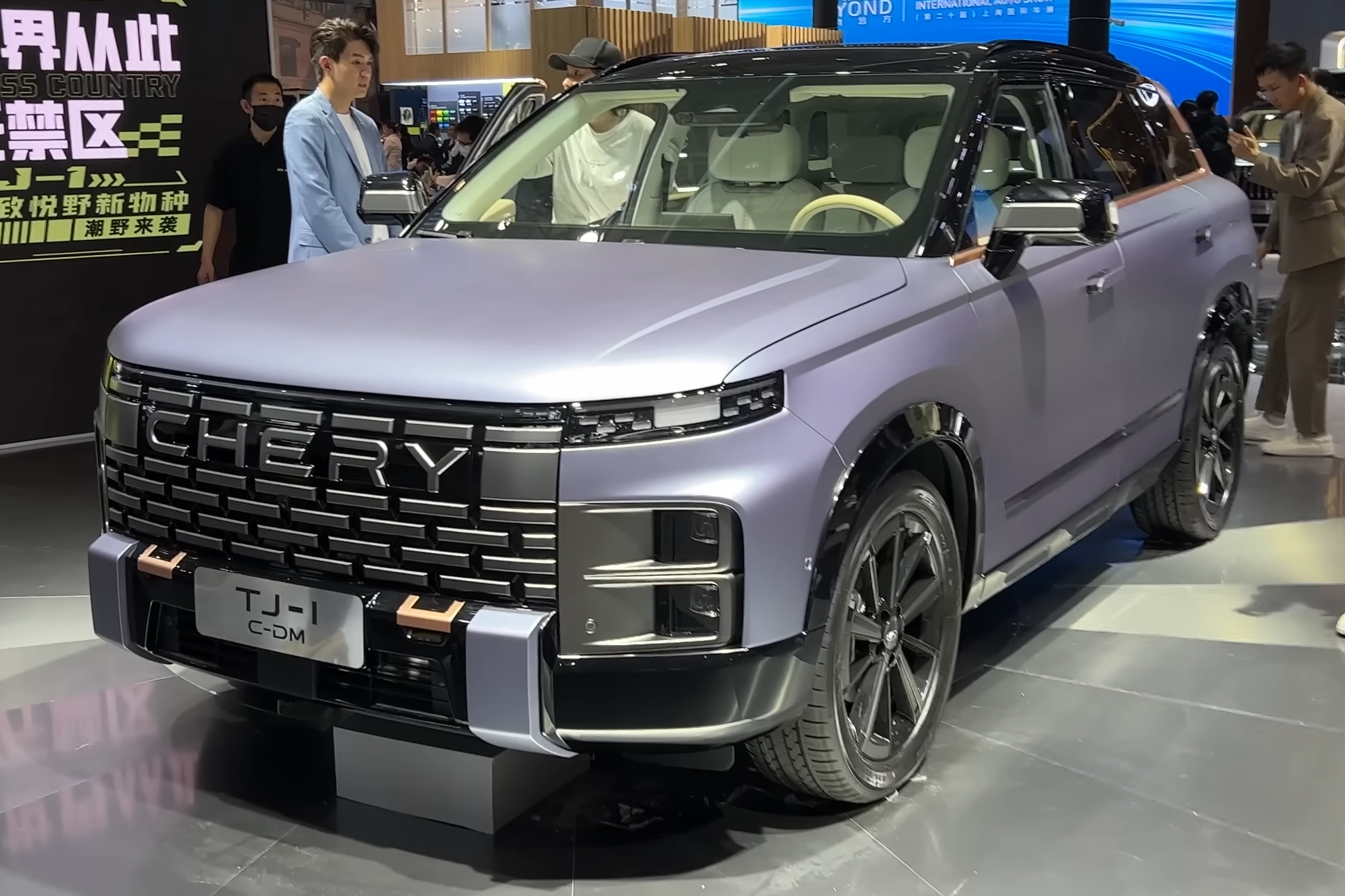
Chery TJ-1 C-DM

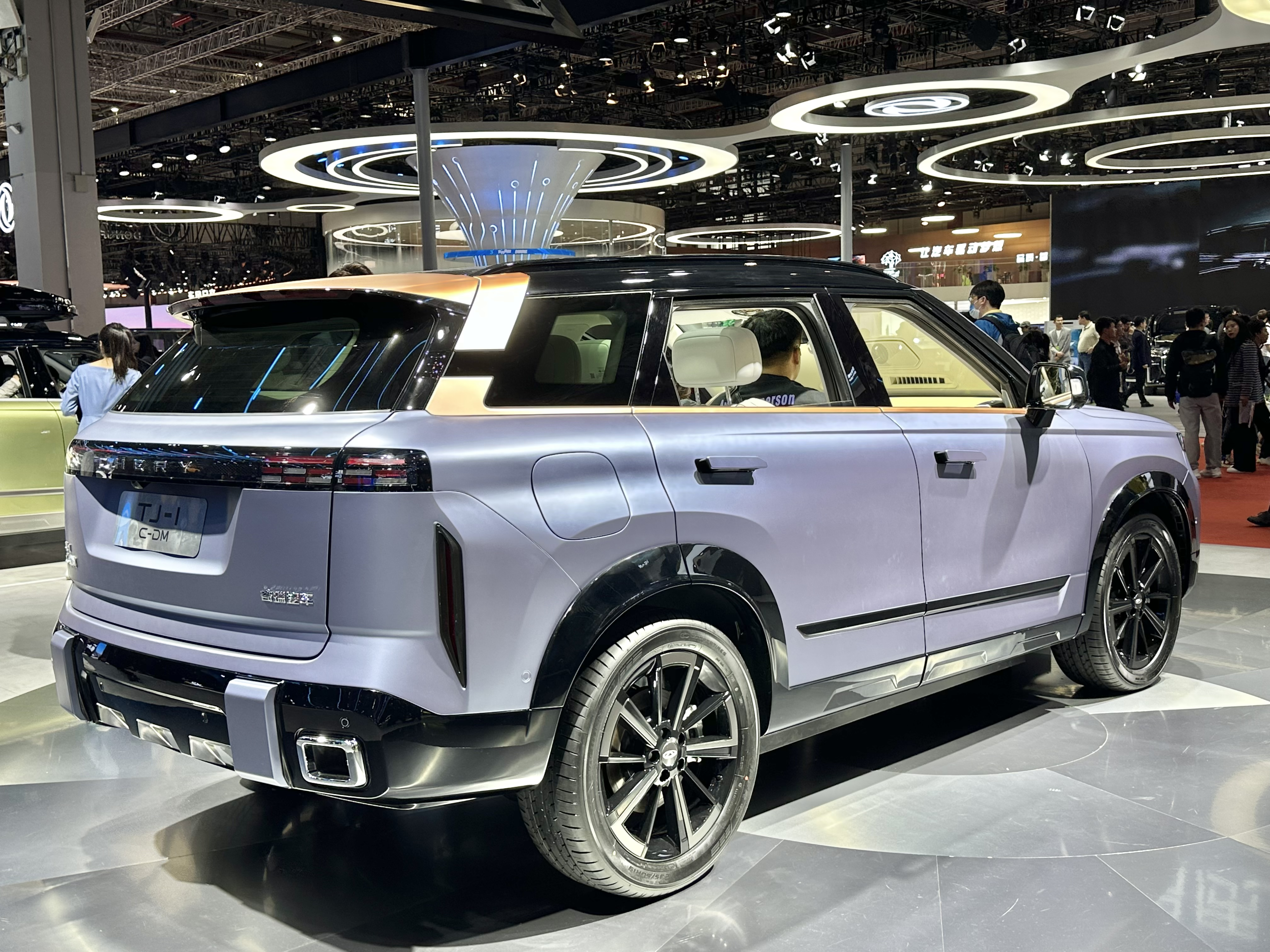
Rear view

The vehicle is powered by a 1.6-litre turbocharged petrol engine producing 145 kW (194 hp; 197 PS) and 290 N⋅m (214 lb⋅ft) mated to a 7-speed dual clutch transmission. All-wheel drive is available. Since 2024, the front-wheel drive 1.5-litre turbo plug-in hybrid version was available producing a combined output of 255 kW (342 hp; 347 PS) and 525 N⋅m (387 lb⋅ft), marketed as C-DM (Chery Dual Mode).

The interior is available in black and white with minimum physical buttons, a rectangular instrument panel, a 14.8-inch touchscreen, a head-up display, and a wireless charging pad. The infotainment screen is powered by a Qualcomm Snapdragon 8155 chip and supports FOTA, facial recognition, and a level 2+ driving assistance system.

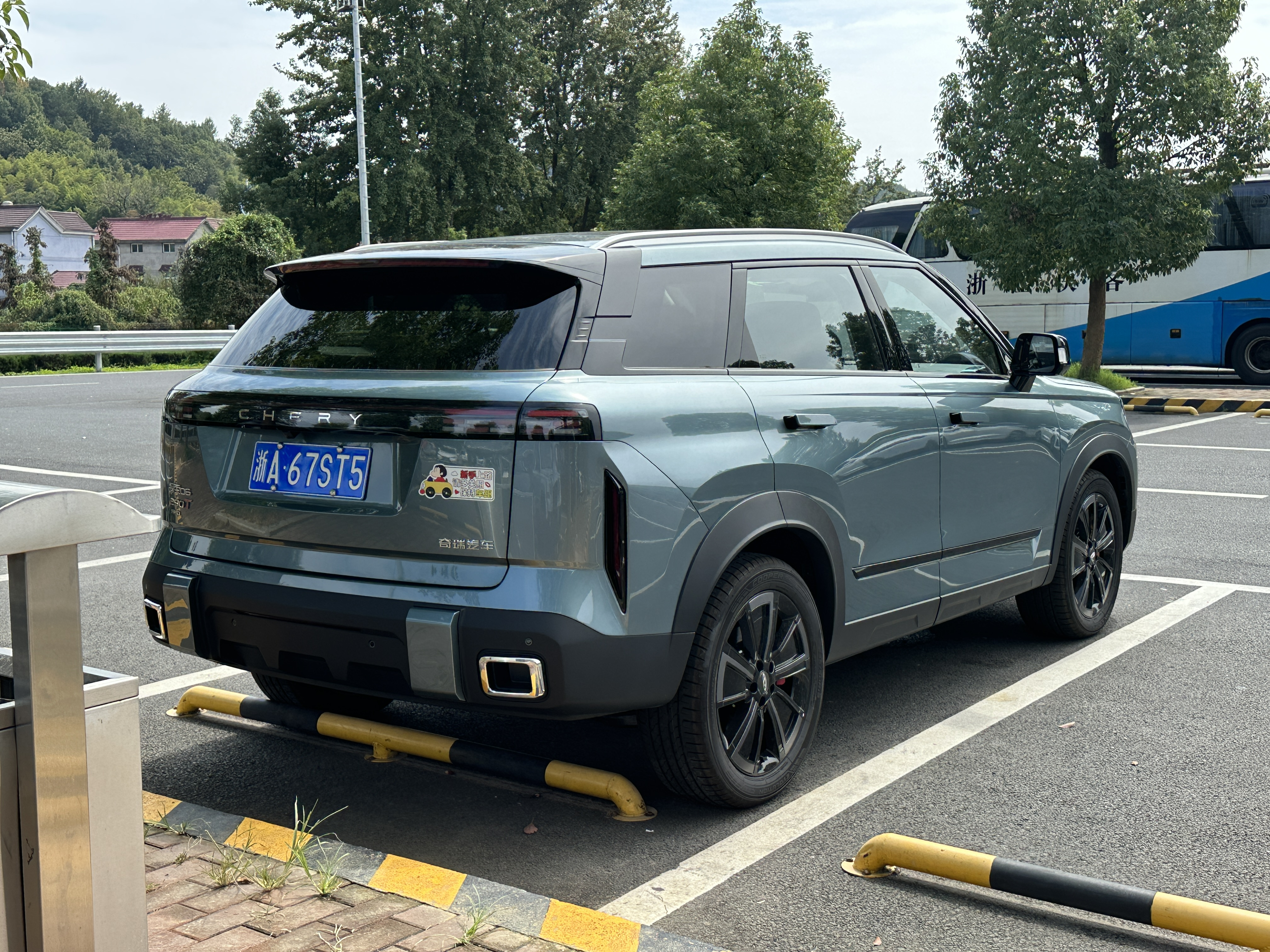
Rear view

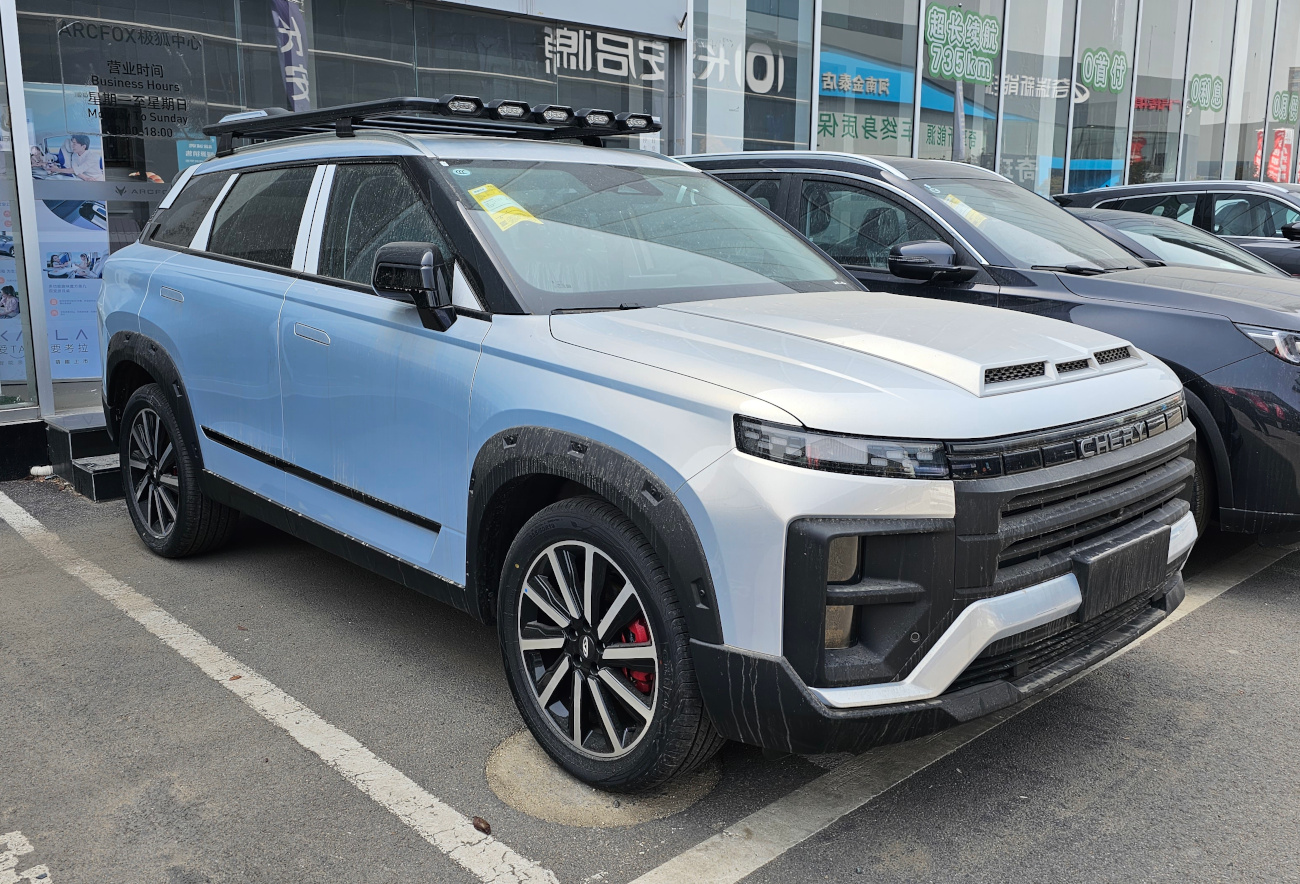
Chery Tansuo 06 Mystic Knight Edition

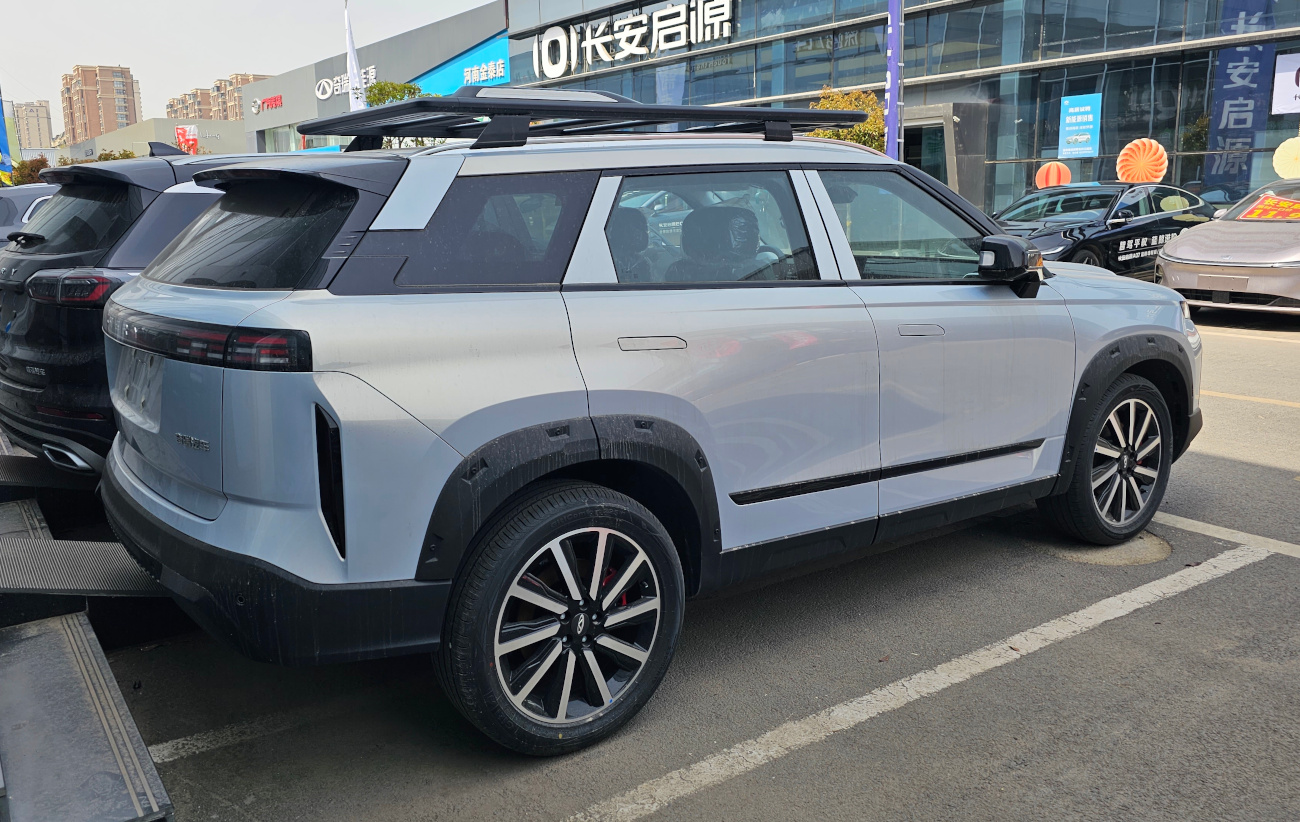
Rear view (Mystic Knight Edition)

== Plug-in hybrid ==
The plug-in hybrid version of the Tansuo 06 went on sale in April and November 2024 as the Chery Tansuo 06/Tiggo 7 C-DM alongside the petrol-powered variant as the Chery Tiggo 7 High Energy. The model is powered by Chery's latest plug-in hybrid system marketed as the Kunpeng Super Hybrid C-DM (Chery Dual Mode). It is a combination of the 1.5-litre turbocharged direct injection petrol engine, a dedicated hybrid transmission (DHT), with a power output of 115 kW (156 PS; 154 hp) and 220 N⋅m (22.4 kg⋅m; 162 lb⋅ft), and a 150 kW (204 PS; 201 hp) electric motor. The electric cruising range is rated at 120 km (75 mi), while overall cruising range is above 1,400 km (870 mi). A version marketed through the Chery Fulwin dealership network went on sale as the Chery Fulwin T6.

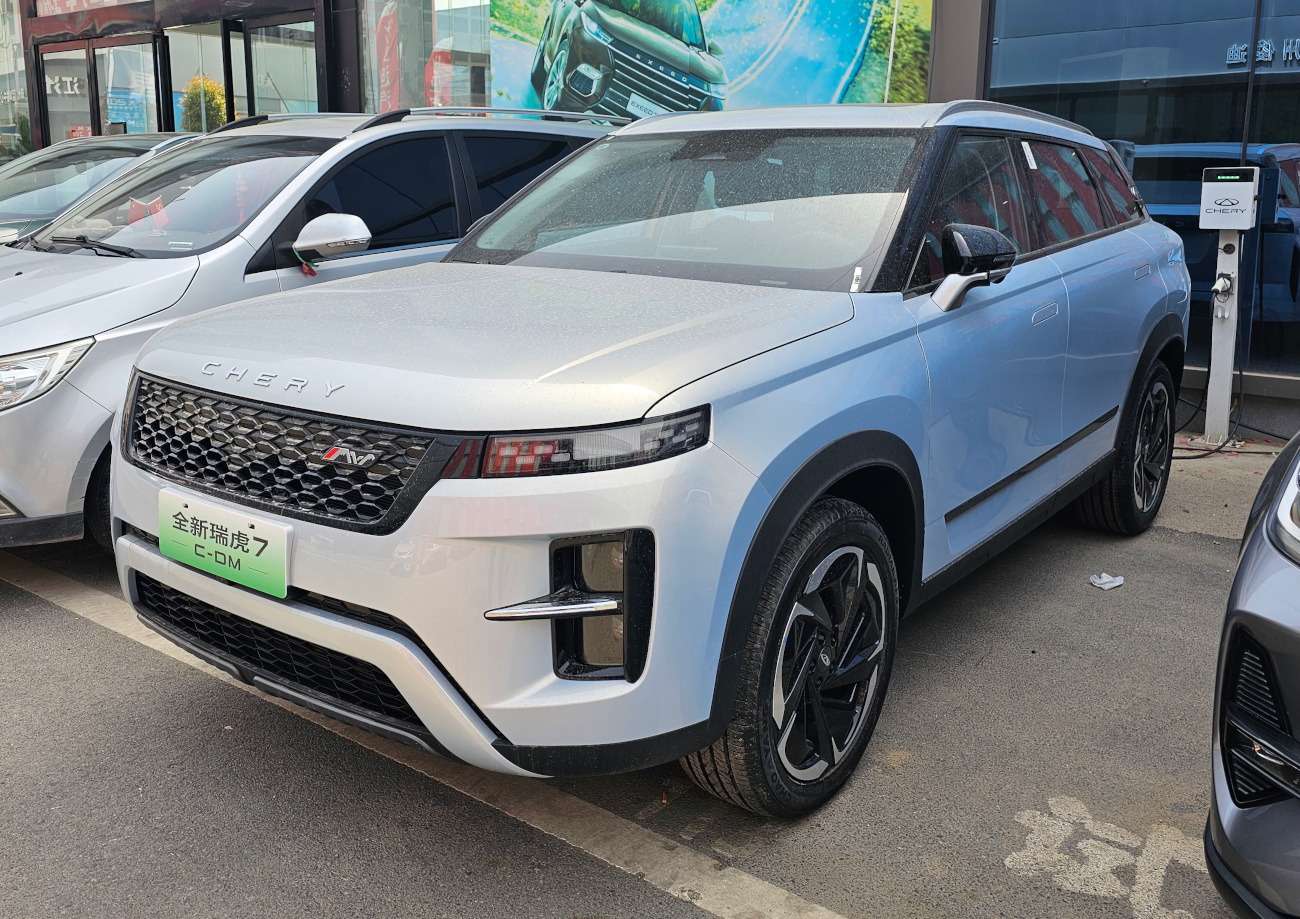
Chery Tiggo 7 High Energy C-DM

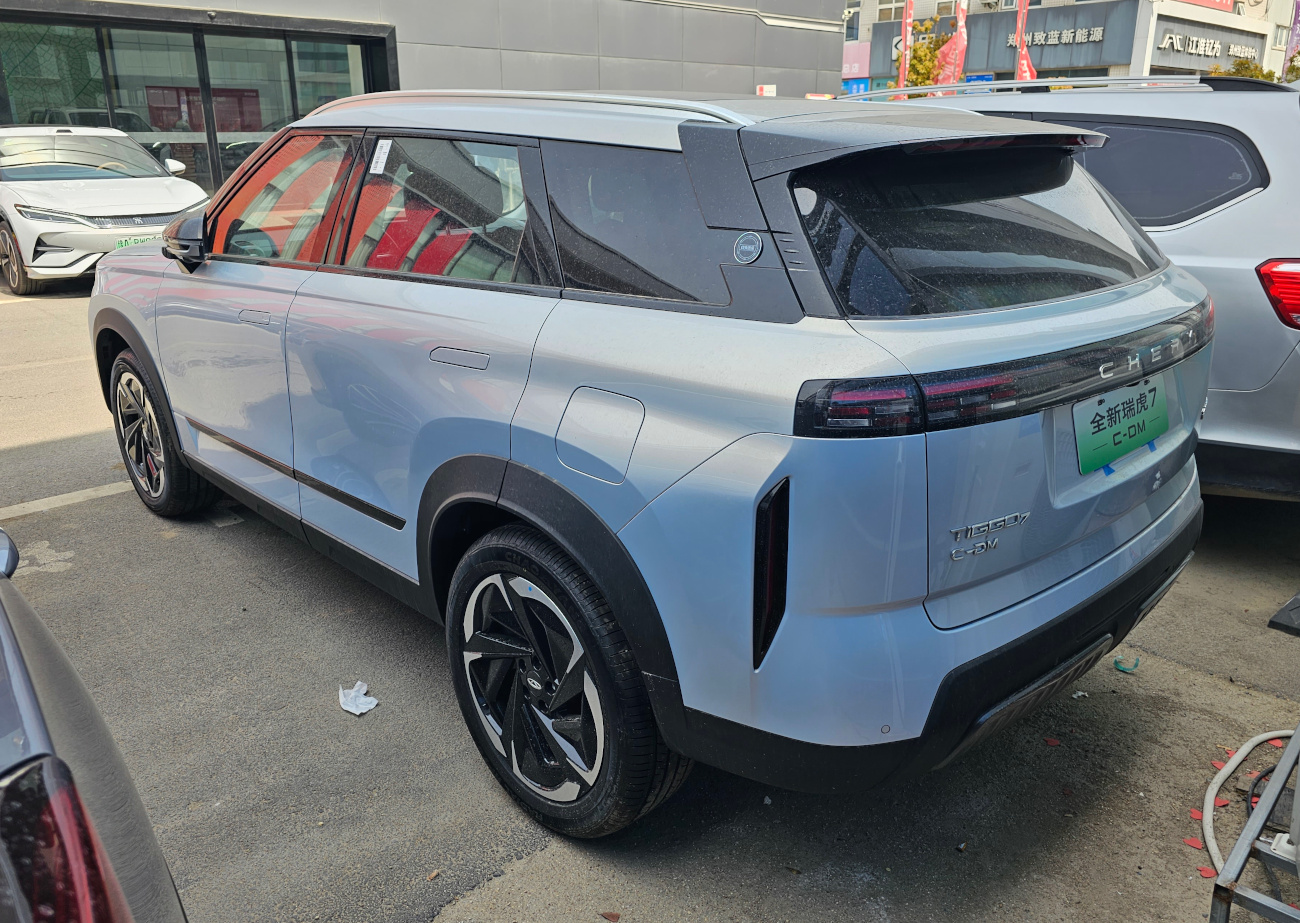
Rear view

== Sales ==
Year	Tansuo 06	Tansuo 06 C-DM	Fulwin T6	Tiggo 7 High Energy
2023	10,024	—	—	
2024	24,508	4,173	1,037	Unknown, merged with Tiggo 7
2025	6,783	—	1,289	
