= Jaecoo J7 =

Compact crossover SUV

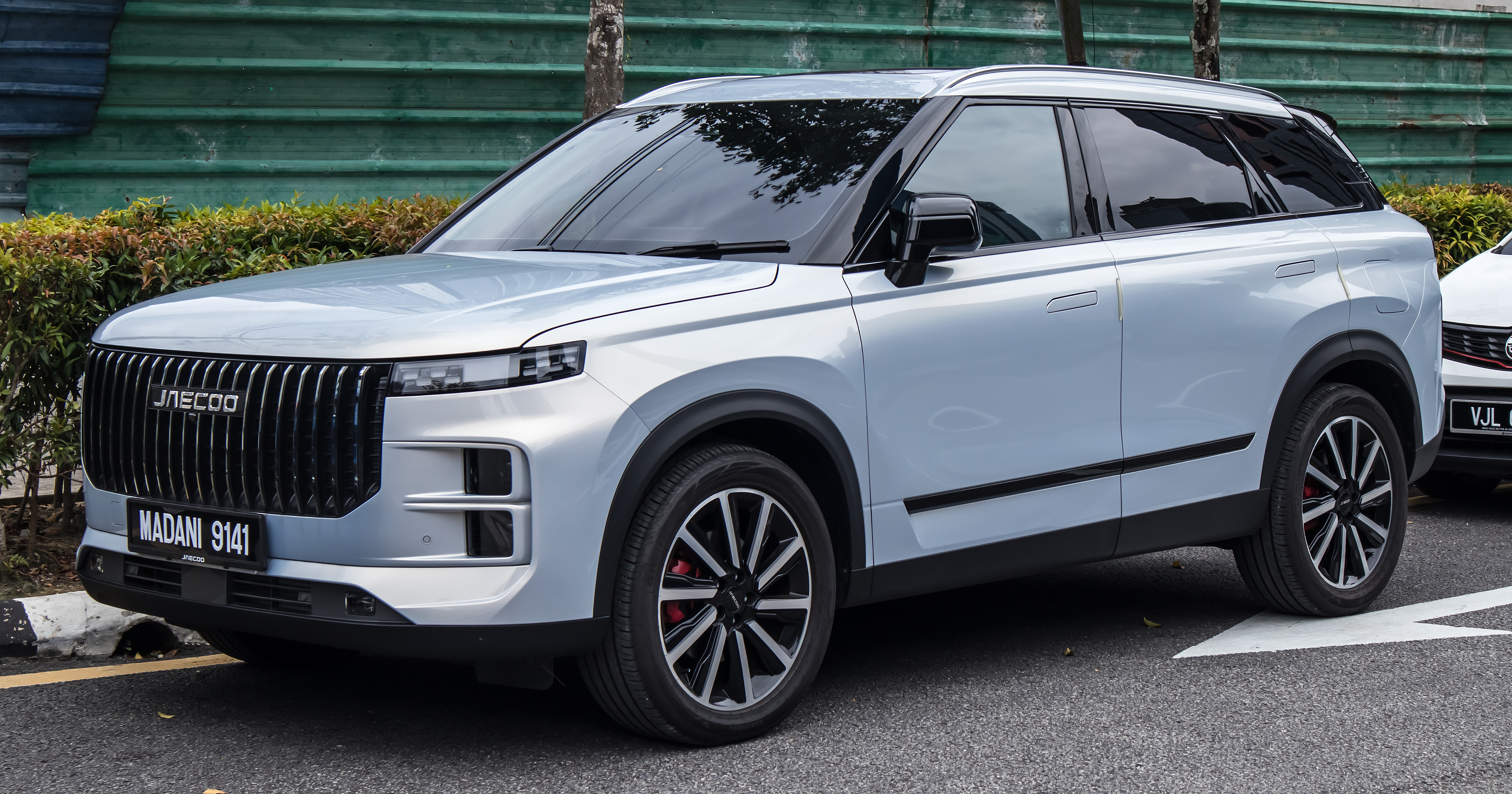

Overview
- Manufacturer: Chery
- Model code: T1EJ
- Also called: Jaecoo 7; Jeland J7 (Russia); Lucano L7 (Iran); Chery Tansuo 06 (China, 2023–2026); Chery Fulwin T6 (China, 2024–2025); Chery Tiggo 7 High Energy (China, 2024–present)
- Production: 2023–present
- Assembly: China: Dalian, Liaoning; Malaysia: Shah Alam, Selangor; Indonesia: Bekasi, West Java (HIM); Iran: Savojbolagh, Alborz (Mammut Group)
- Designer: Steve Eum

Body and chassis
- Class: Compact crossover SUV (C)
- Body style: 5-door SUV
- Layout: Front-engine, front-wheel-drive; Front-engine, all-wheel-drive
- Platform: T1X
- Related: Chery Tiggo 7; Chery Tiggo 8; Chery Omoda 5; Jaecoo J5

Powertrain
- Engine: Petrol: 1.6 L Kunpeng SQRF4J16 turbo I4; Petrol hybrid: 1.5 L turbo I4 (SHS-H); Petrol plug-in hybrid: 1.5 L SQRH4J15 turbo I4 (SHS-P)
- Electric motor: Permanent magnet synchronous reluctance (SHS-P)
- Transmission: 7-speed dual-clutch; Dedicated hybrid transmission (DHT) (SHS)
- Hybrid drivetrain: Series-parallel hybrid (SHS-H); Plug-in hybrid (SHS-P)
- Battery: 18.32 kWh FinDreams LFP (SHS-P/C-DM)
- Electric range: WLTP: 88 km (55 mi) (SHS-P)

Dimensions
- Wheelbase: 2,650 mm (104.3 in)
- Length: 4,451–4,501 mm (175.2–177.2 in)
- Width: 1,865 mm (73.4 in)
- Height: 1,670 mm (65.7 in)

The Jaecoo J7 (also known as Jaecoo 7) is a compact crossover SUV (C-segment) produced by Chery since 2023. Outside China, the vehicle is marketed under the Jaecoo brand as its first product. It is available in both a petrol variant and a plug-in hybrid.

In China, it is marketed as the Chery Tansuo 06 (Chinese: 奇瑞探索06; pinyin: Qíruì Tànsuǒ 06). It is also marketed as the Chery Fulwin T6 (Chinese: 奇瑞风云T6; pinyin: Qíruì Fēngyún T6) (plug-in hybrid only) and Chery Tiggo 7 High Energy (Chinese: 奇瑞瑞虎7高能; pinyin: Qíruì Ruìhǔ 7 Gāonéng) since 2024.

The car's "striking" resemblance to Range Rover models has led to the nickname "Temu Range Rover", a nod to its styling and features at approximately one third of the price; Chery has a joint venture with Jaguar Land Rover that produced some of its cars in China.

== History ==
The vehicle was first introduced during the Auto Shanghai 2023 as the Chery TJ-1 C-DM prototype. It went on sale in China in August 2023 as the Chery Tansuo 06.

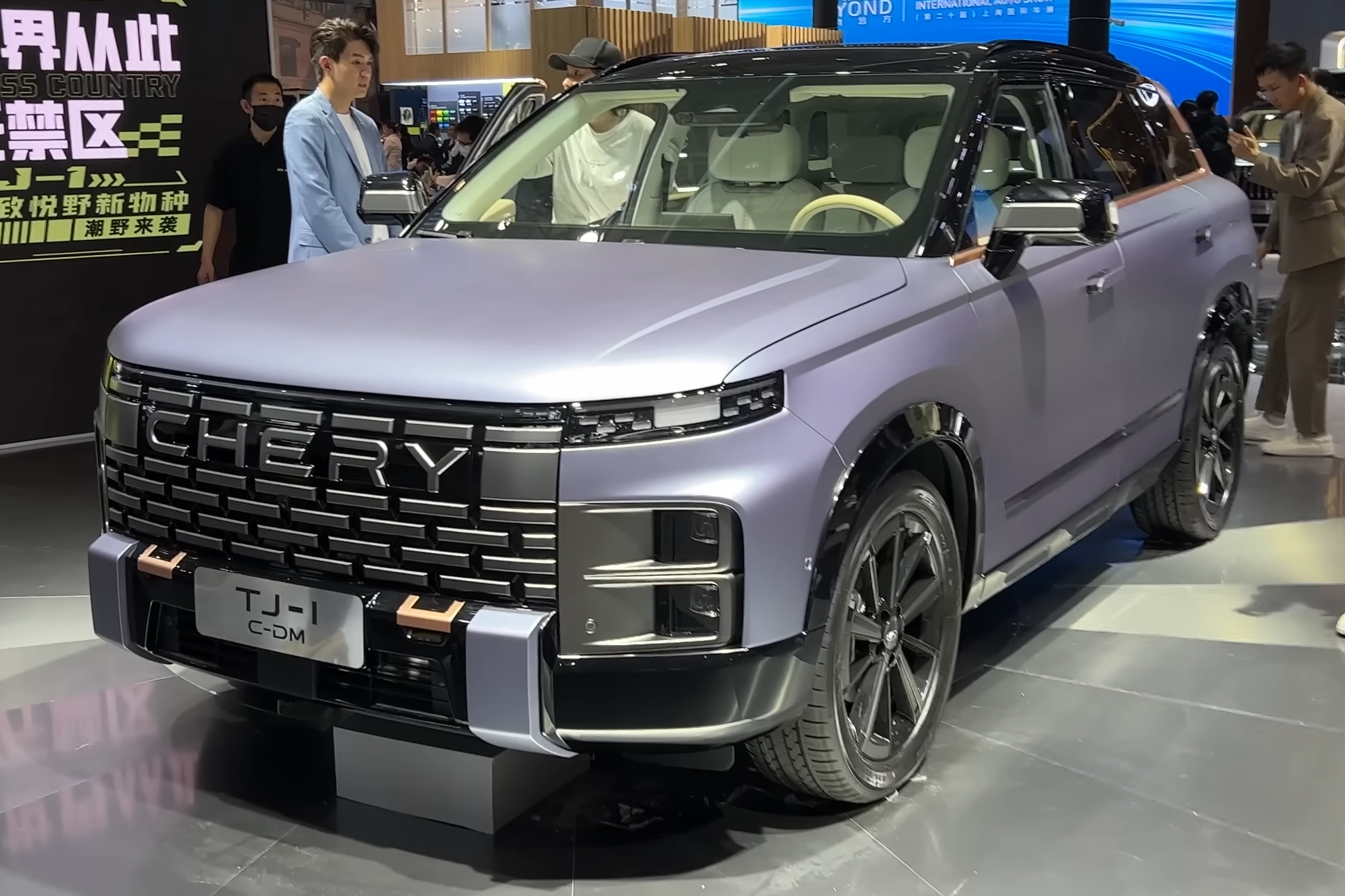
Chery TJ-1 C-DM

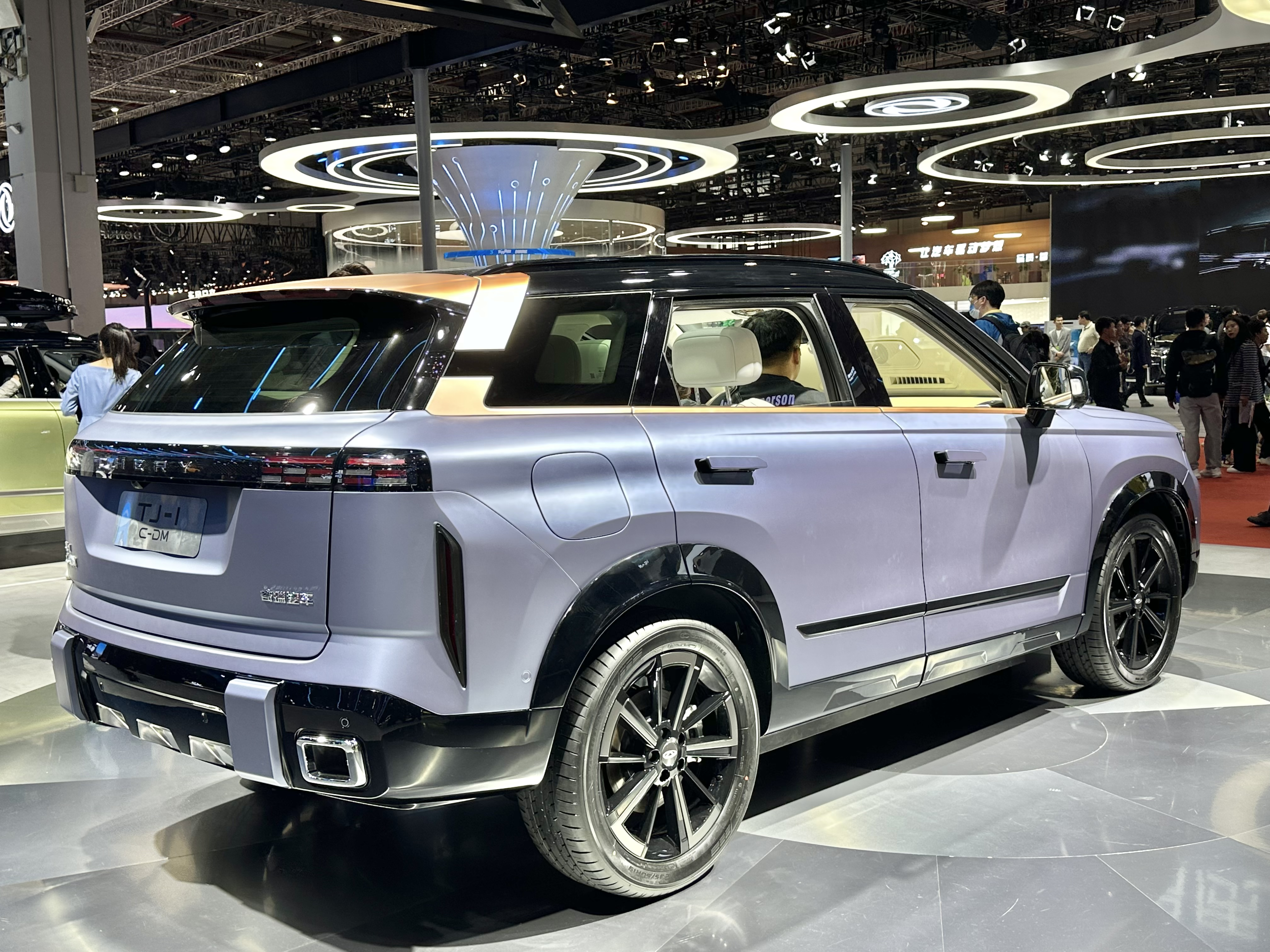
Rear view

== Specifications and equipment ==
The vehicle is powered by a 1.6-litre turbocharged petrol engine producing 145 kW (194 hp; 197 PS) and 290 N⋅m (214 lb⋅ft) mated to a 7-speed dual clutch transmission. All-wheel drive is available. Since 2024, the front-wheel drive 1.5-litre turbo plug-in hybrid version was available producing a combined output of 255 kW (342 hp; 347 PS) and 525 N⋅m (387 lb⋅ft), marketed as C-DM (Chery Dual Mode) in China and as SHS (Super Hybrid System) outside China.

The interior is available in black and white with minimal physical buttons, a rectangular instrument panel, a 14.8-inch touchscreen, a head-up display, and a wireless charging pad. The infotainment screen is powered by a Qualcomm 8155 chip and supports FOTA, facial recognition, and a level 2+ driving assistance system.

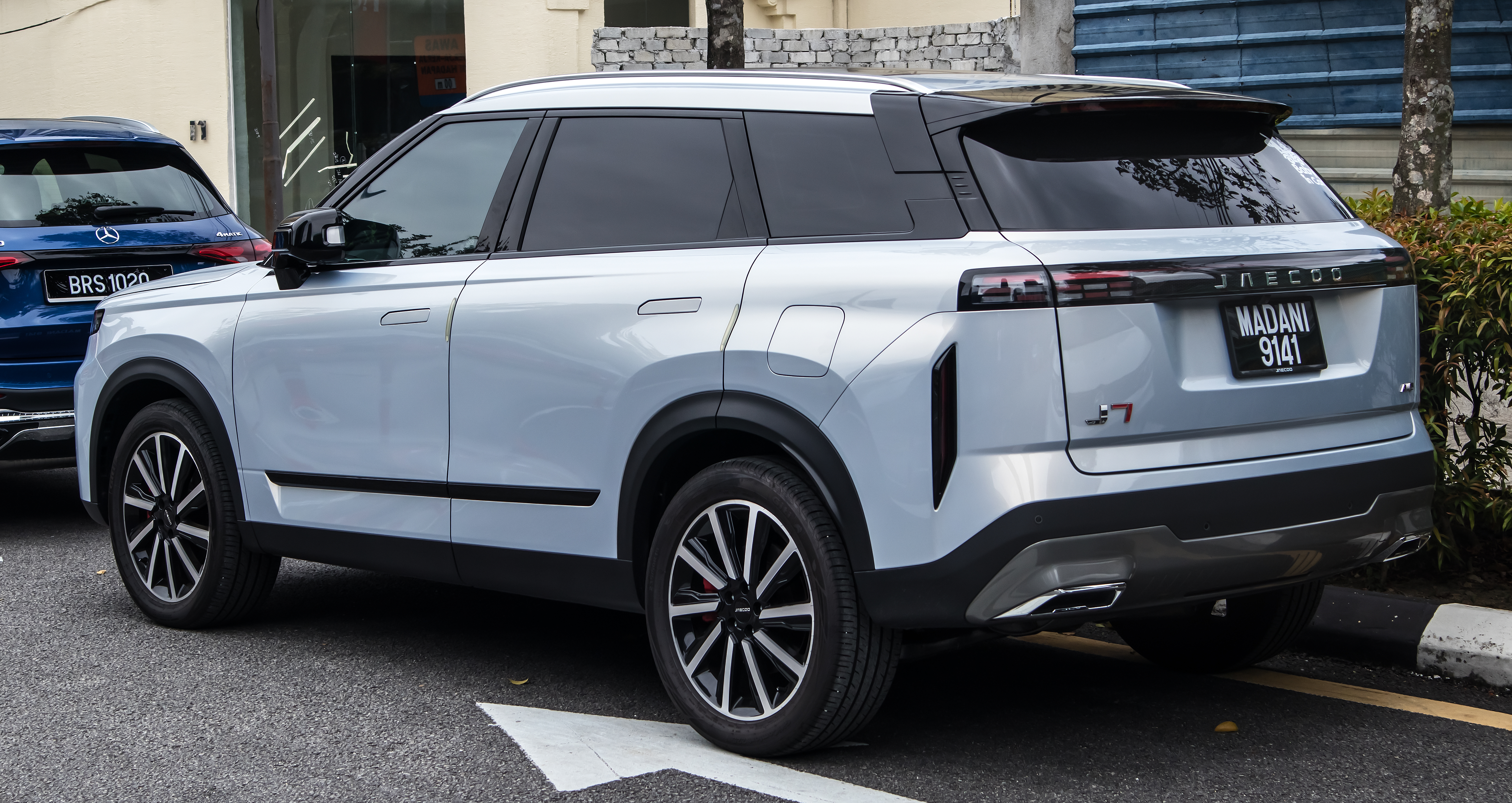
Rear view

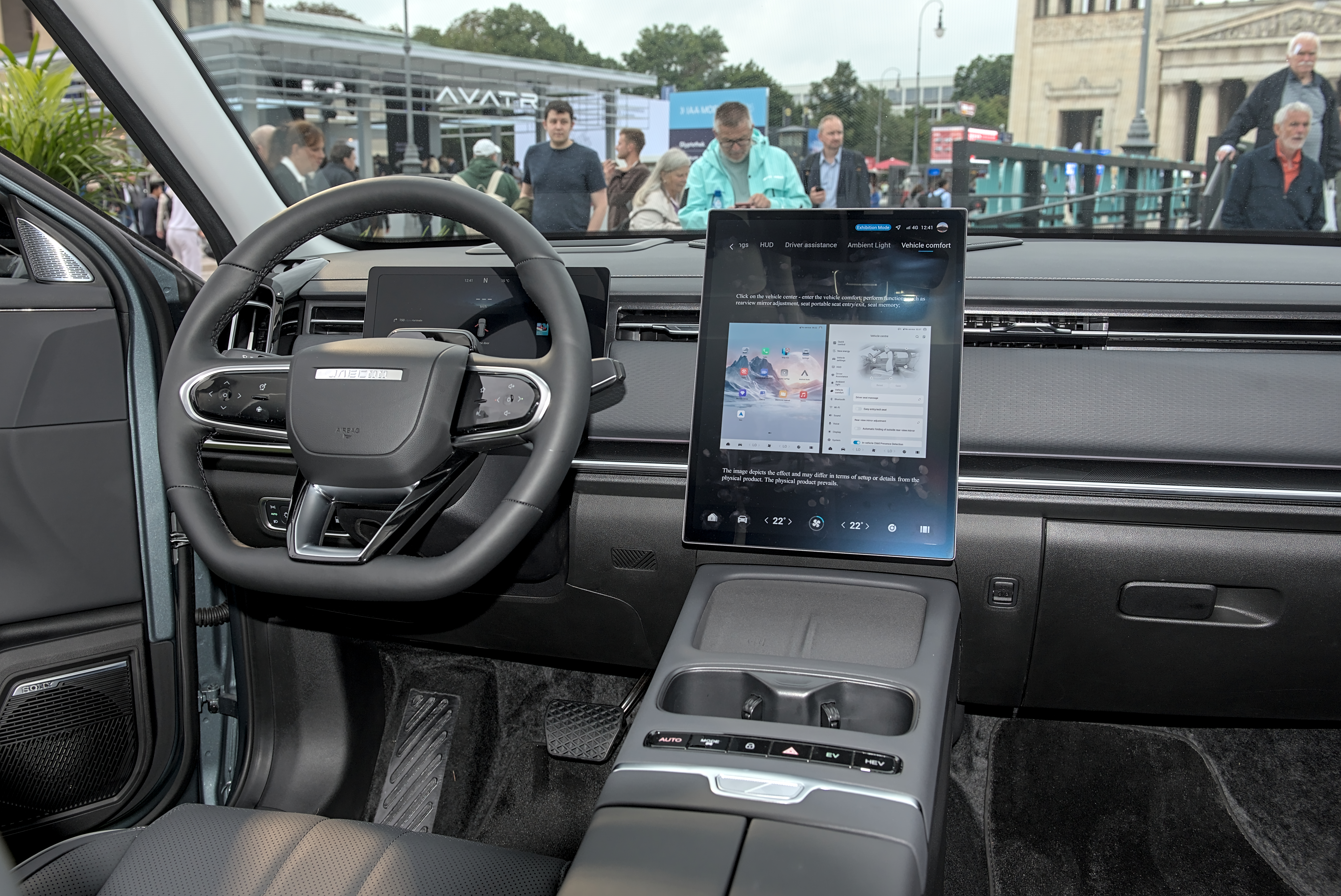
Interior

== Safety ==
Euro NCAP test results Jaecoo 7 PHEV Exclusive FWD (LHD) (2025)
Test	Points	%
Overall:	5 /5 stars	
Adult occupant:	32.8	81%
Child occupant:	39.5	80%
Pedestrian:	50.6	80%
Safety assist:	14.4	80%

ANCAP test results Jaecoo J7 PHEV (2025, aligned with Euro NCAP)
Test	Points	%
Overall:	5 /5 stars	
Adult occupant:	32.79	81%
Child occupant:	42.10	85%
Pedestrian:	50.56	80%
Safety assist:	15.28	84%

== Markets ==
=== China ===
The vehicle went on sale in China as the Chery Tansuo 06 in August 2023 with four trim levels. Its powertrain option was a sole 1.6-litre turbocharged petrol engine with a 7-speed dual clutch transmission, with front-wheel drive and all-wheel drive options.

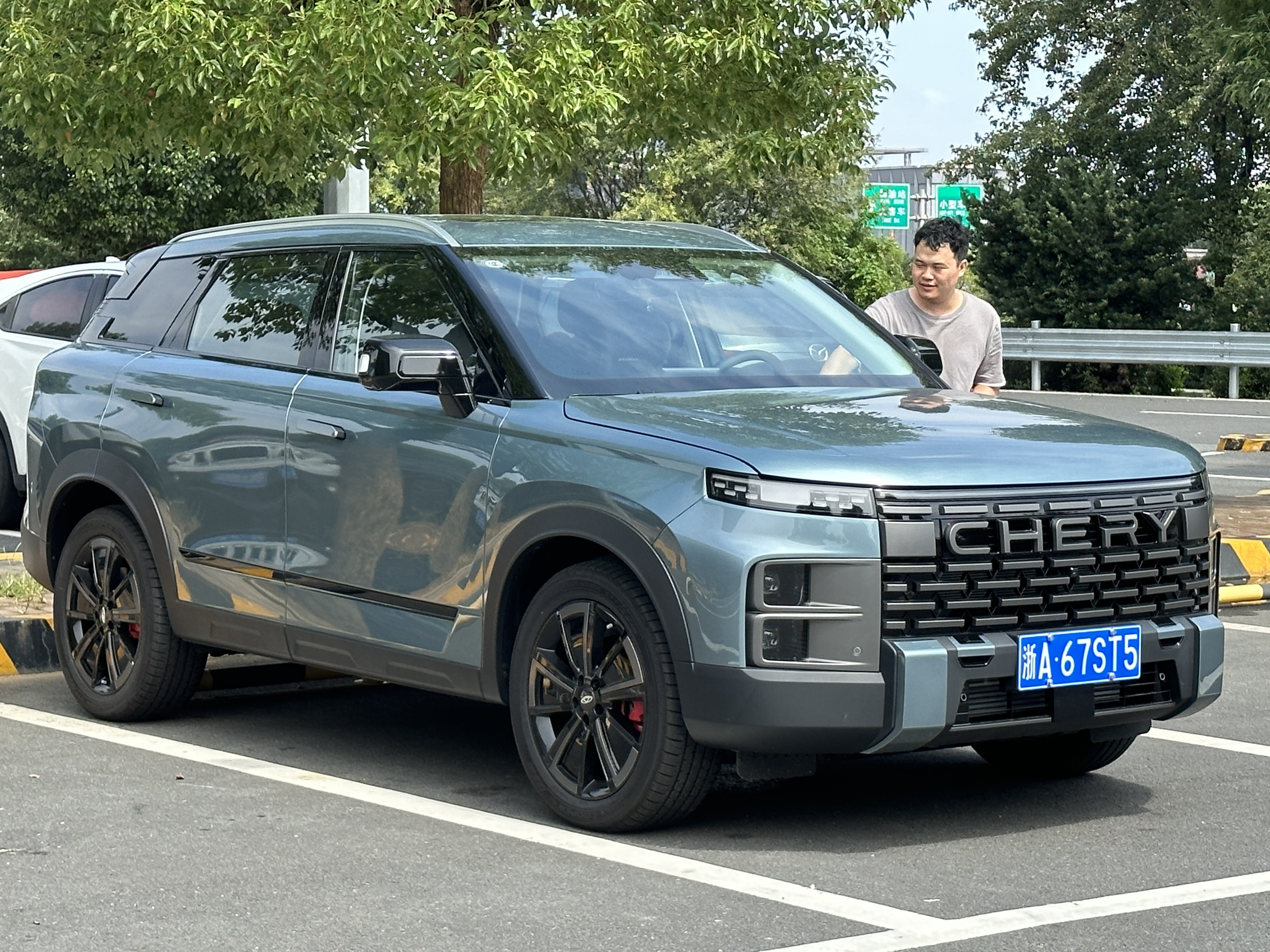
2023 Chery Tansuo 06

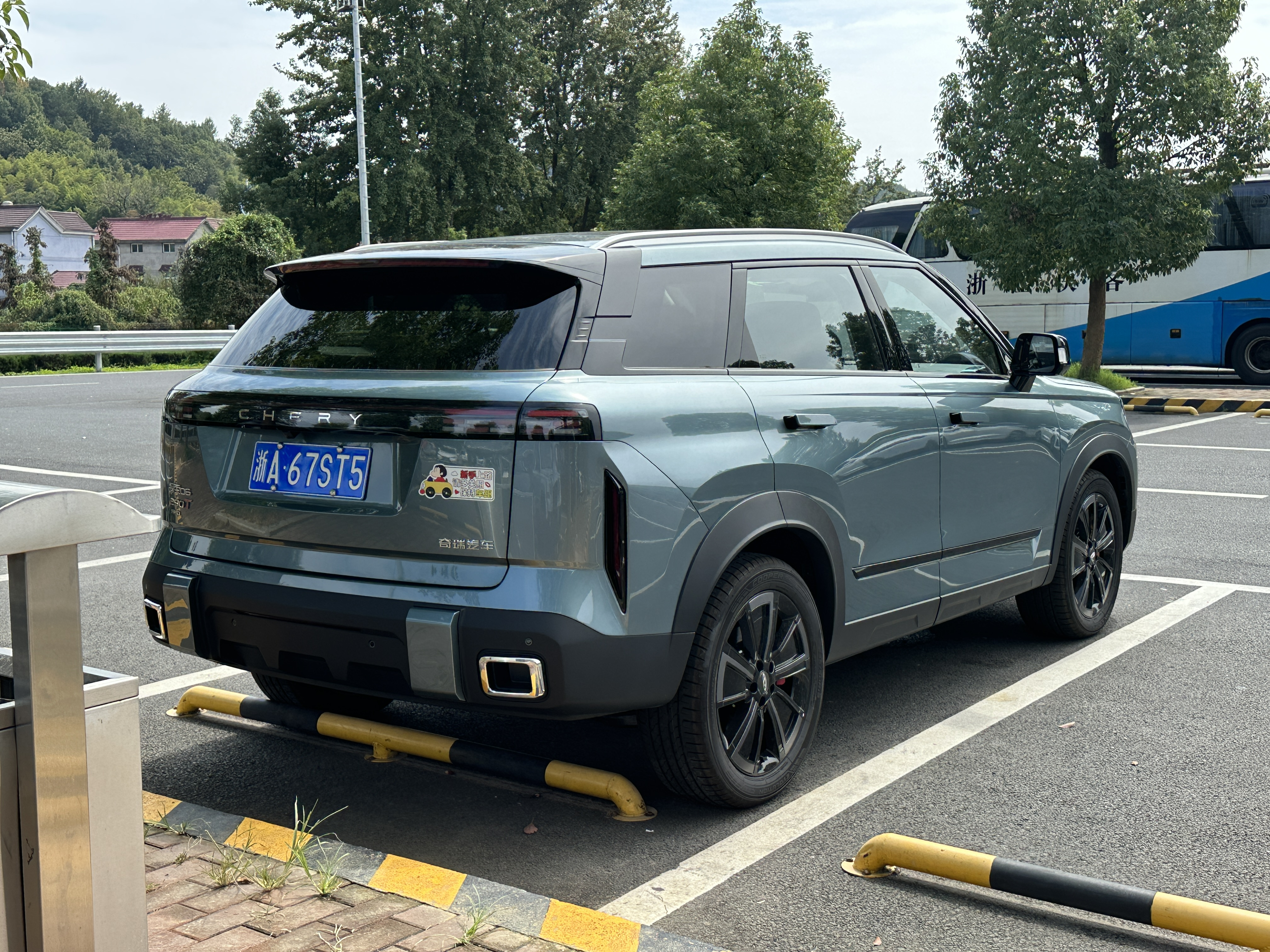
Rear view

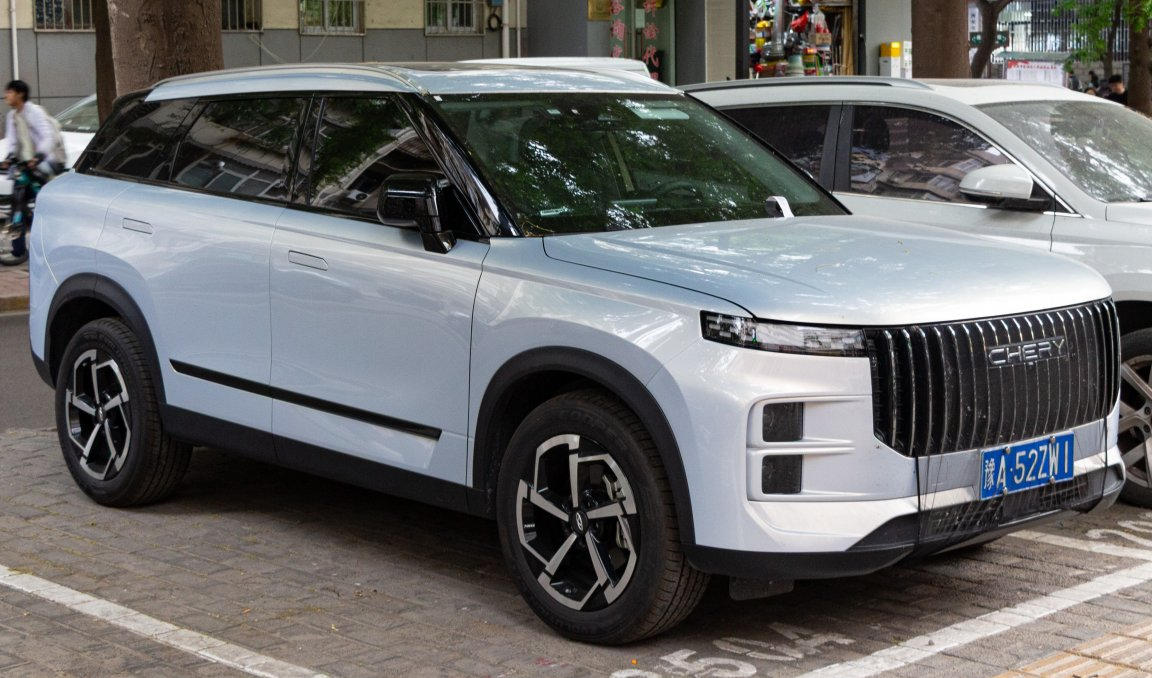
2023 Chery Tansuo 06

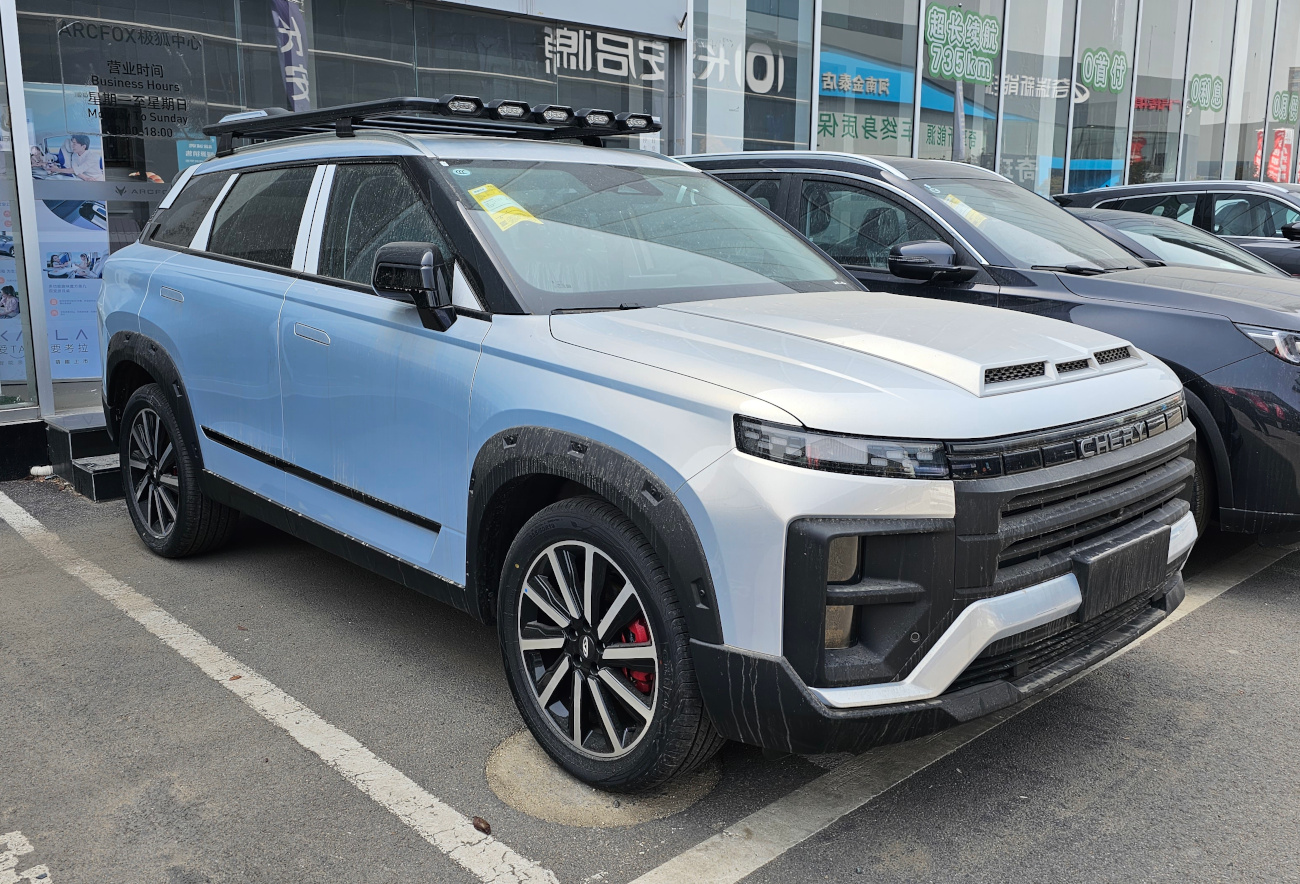
2025 Chery Tansuo 06

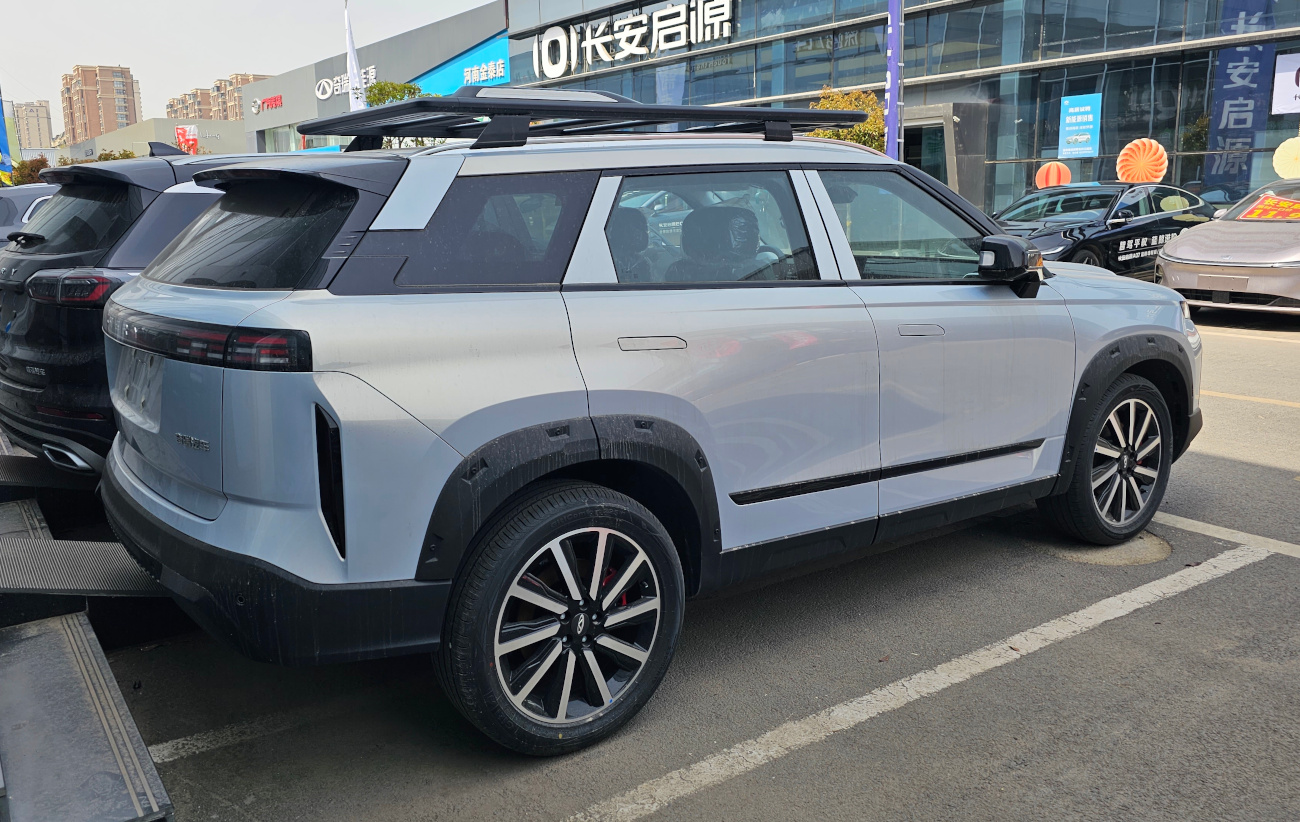
Rear view

==== Plug-in hybrid ====
The plug-in hybrid version of the Tansuo 06 went on sale in April and November 2024 as the Chery Tansuo 06/Tiggo 7 C-DM alongside the petrol-powered variant as the Chery Tiggo 7 High Energy. The model is powered by Chery's latest plug-in hybrid system marketed as the Kunpeng Super Hybrid C-DM (Chery Dual Mode). It is a combination of the 1.5-litre turbocharged direct injection petrol engine, a dedicated hybrid transmission (DHT), with a power output of 115 kW (156 PS; 154 hp) and 220 N⋅m (22.4 kg⋅m; 162 lb⋅ft), and a 150 kW (204 PS; 201 hp) electric motor. The electric cruising range is rated at 120 km (75 mi), while overall cruising range is above 1,400 km (870 mi). A version marketed through the Chery Fulwin dealership network went on sale as the Chery Fulwin T6.

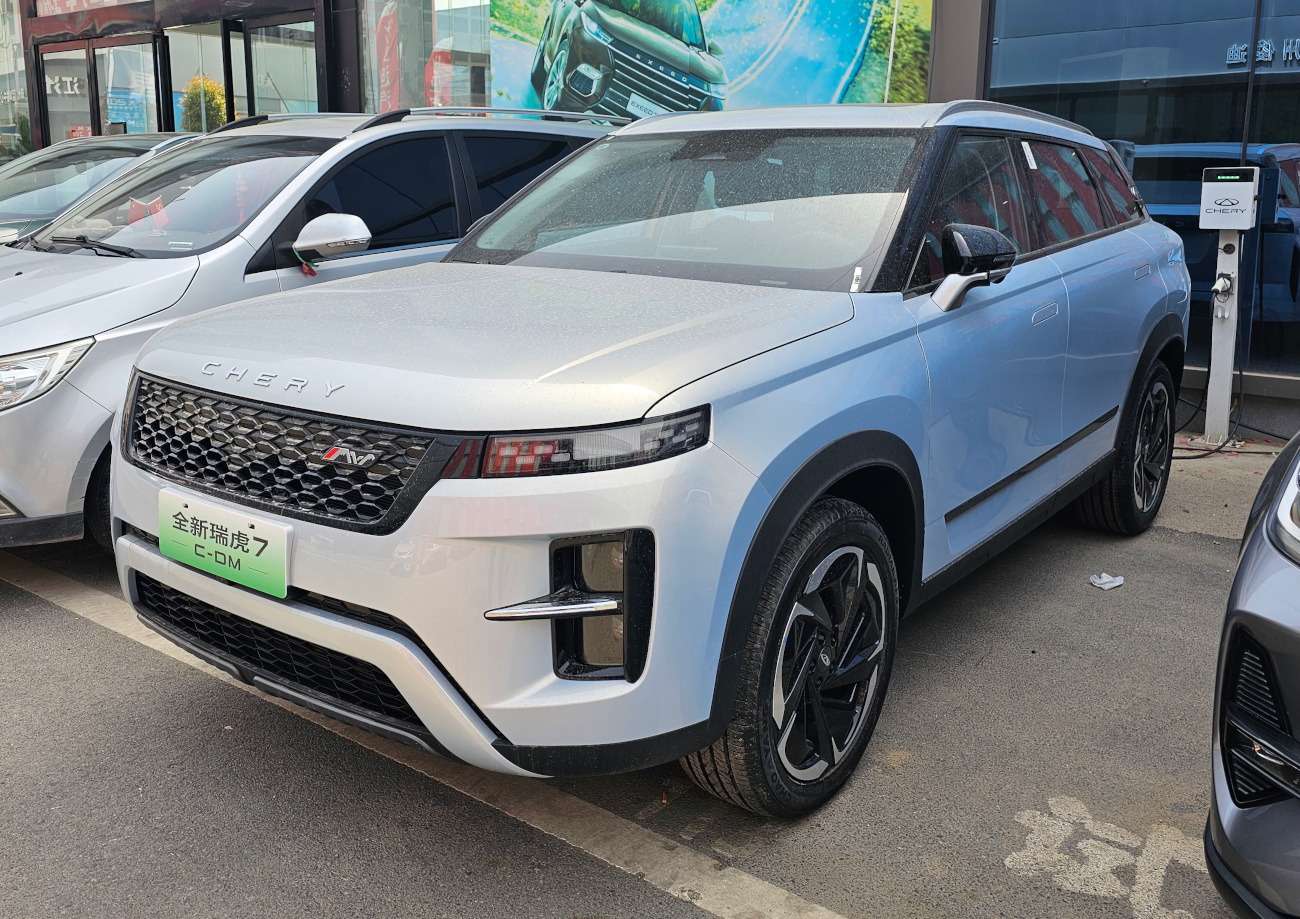
Chery Tiggo 7 High Energy C-DM

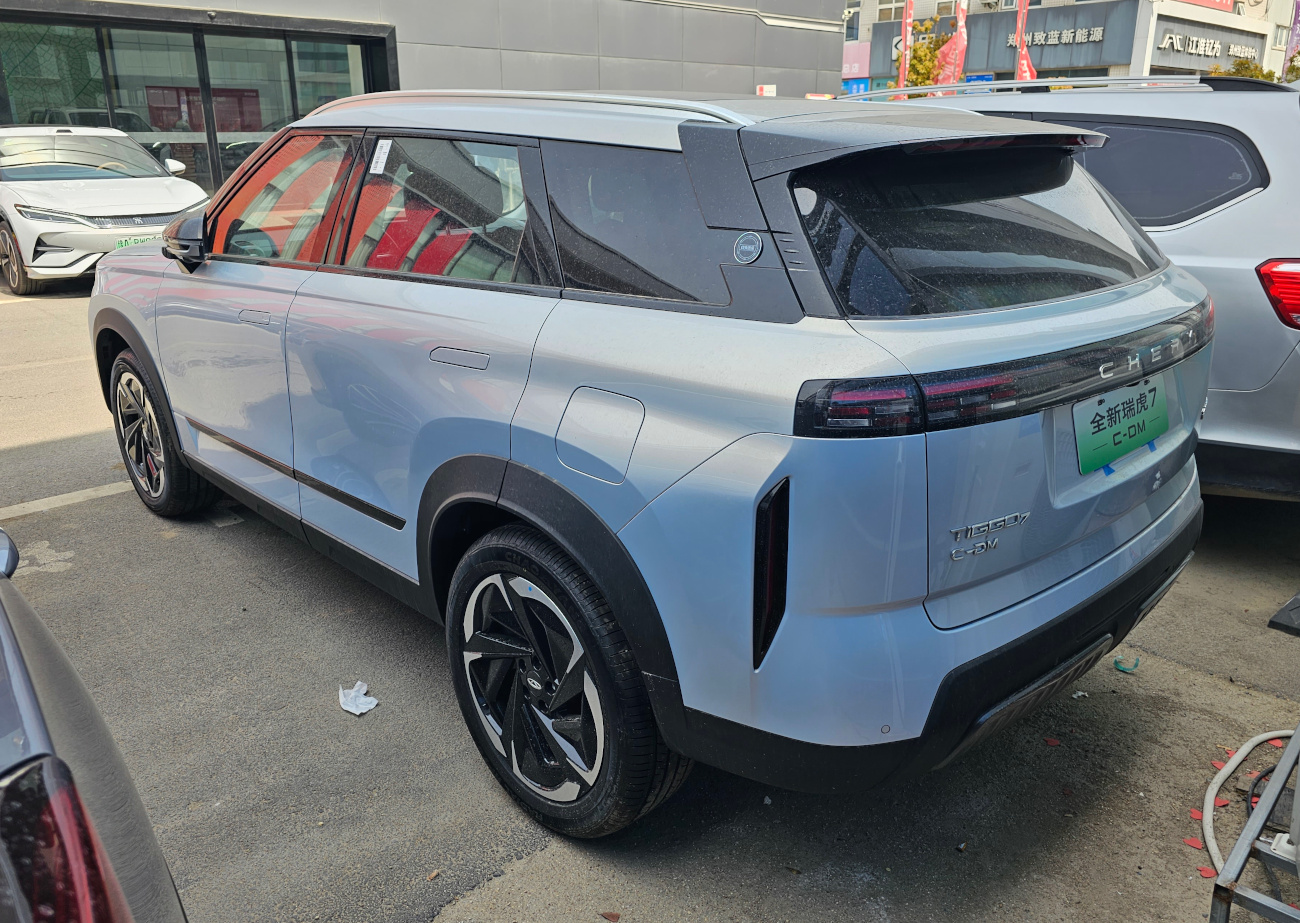
Rear view

=== Europe ===
Chery planned production of the Jaecoo J7 for the European market at the former Nissan Motor Ibérica plant in Barcelona.

==== United Kingdom ====
The Jaecoo 7 was launched in December 2024, as the first of five models that Jaecoo planned to bring in the UK market in 2025. As of launch the Jaecoo 7 is available with a 1.6-litre turbocharged petrol engine, with optional all-wheel-drive, and also a 1.5-litre petrol with plug-in hybrid capabilities, known as the Jaecoo 7 SHS, which has a pure electric range of 57 miles (92 km). Jaecoo is offering a 7-year/100,000-mile (160,000 km) warranty with the 7 SUV.

The Jaecoo 7 became the best-selling car of September, 2026, the second month it took the top spot in 2026.

=== Latin America ===
==== Brazil ====
The Jaecoo 7 was launched in Brazil on 15 April 2025, alongside the Omoda E5 as part of Omoda-Jaecoo introduction in Brazil. It is available with two variants: Luxury and Prestige, powered by a 1.5-litre turbocharged petrol plug-in hybrid (PHEV). In April 2026, the Elite variant was introduced as the flagship variant.

==== Mexico ====
The Jaecoo 7 was launched in Mexico on 20 February 2024, as the first Jaecoo model to be sold in Mexico. At launch, it was available with three variants: Elemental, Inspire and Refine, powered by a 1.6-litre turbocharged petrol engine with front-wheel drive. The PHEV petrol plug-in hybrid (SHS) model with front-wheel drive was added in June 2025 for the Elemental and Inspire variants.

=== Oceania ===
==== Australia ====
Pricing and specifications for the Jaecoo J7 in Australia were announced in March 2025, and it was later launched in May 2025. The vehicle is available in four trim levels: Core, Track, Ridge, and Summit. Customers can choose between a 1.6-litre turbocharged petrol engine or a 1.5-litre turbocharged petrol plug-in hybrid (SHS), with the latter powertrain available only for the Summit trim. All variants are front-wheel drive, except that the Ridge trim comes standard with all-wheel drive. In November 2025, the Track trim became available with the 1.5-litre turbocharged petrol plug-in hybrid (SHS). In February 2026, the Core trim was discontinued and the Track trim became the entry-level trim.

In September 2026, the J7 line-up was updated for the 2027 model year which saw the non-hybrid model became available solely in the Ridge trim and the all-wheel drive option became available with the 1.5-litre turbocharged petrol plug-in hybrid (SHS).

==== New Zealand ====
The Jaecoo J7 went on sale in New Zealand on 31 July 2024, powered by a 1.6-litre turbocharged petrol engine with front-wheel and all-wheel drive options. It is available in two variants: EX 2WD and EX+ AWD.

=== Russia ===
The Jaecoo J7 went on sale in Russia in September 2023 as the first model from Jaecoo. It is available with front and all-wheel drive in four different trim levels: Lifestyle, Ultimate, Active and Supreme. It is powered by a 1.6-litre turbocharged petrol engine. It is sold through Omoda-Jaecoo dealerships, although some will be standalone Jaecoo dealers.

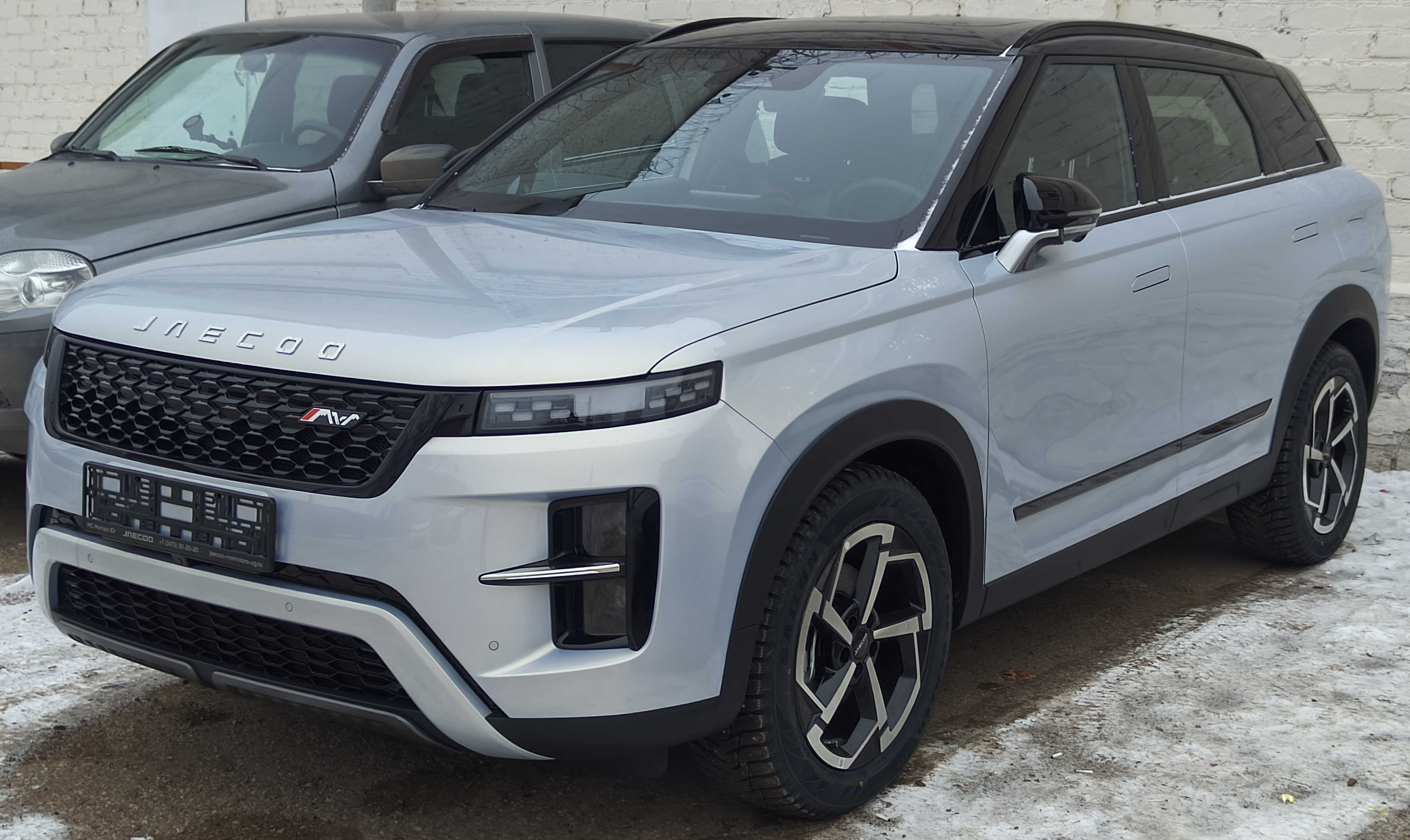
2025 Jaecoo J7 Limited Edition (Russia)

=== South Africa ===
The Jaecoo J7 was launched in South Africa on 12 April 2024, as the first Jaecoo model to be sold in South Africa. At launch, three trims are available: Vortex, Glacier and Inferno; it is powered by a 1.6-litre turbocharged petrol engine and all-wheel drive comes as standard on the top Inferno trim. The PHEV petrol plug-in hybrid (SHS) model with front-wheel drive was added in June 2025 serving as the flagship variant.

=== Southeast Asia ===
==== Brunei ====
The Jaecoo J7 was launched in Brunei on 3 April 2026, powered by a 1.6-litre turbocharged petrol engine available only in front-wheel drive.

==== Indonesia ====
Debuting on 20 January 2025, the J7 is the first Jaecoo model to be sold in Indonesia. The vehicle is available with a 1.6-litre turbocharged petrol, available in front-wheel drive or all-wheel drive, as well a 1.5-litre turbocharged petrol plug-in hybrid (PHEV) marketed by Jaecoo as the Super Hybrid System (SHS). Pre-orders were opened on 13 February 2025, where the estimated pricing range was announced at the 32nd Indonesia International Motor Show. Pricing was revealed at the 32nd Gaikindo Indonesia International Auto Show, however, the FWD variant was not made available because of Jaecoo's marketing position is different from Chery in Indonesia and "Jaecoo's identity is off-road and is geared towards personal use."

The J7 is locally assembled by Handal Indonesia Motor in Bekasi, West Java.

==== Malaysia ====
The Jaecoo J7 was launched in Malaysia on 19 July 2024, powered by a 1.6-litre turbocharged petrol engine available in front-wheel drive or all-wheel drive. It is locally assembled at a plant in Shah Alam, Selangor exclusive to vehicles marketed under the Jaecoo brand. The PHEV petrol plug-in hybrid model with front-wheel drive was added in February 2025 serving as the flagship variant.

==== Philippines ====
The Jaecoo J7 was first introduced to the Philippines in April 2025 at the 2025 Manila International Auto Show, and was launched on 15 August 2025. It is available in two variants: Comfort and Premium, powered by a 1.5-litre turbocharged petrol plug-in hybrid (SHS) with front-wheel drive.

==== Singapore ====
The Jaecoo J7 was launched in Singapore on 9 January 2025 in the sole variant, powered by a 1.5-litre turbocharged petrol plug-in hybrid (SHS) with front-wheel drive.

==== Thailand ====
The Jaecoo J7 was launched in Thailand on 24 March 2025, powered by a 1.5-litre turbocharged petrol plug-in hybrid (SHS) with front-wheel drive. It is available in Dynamic and Max trim levels.

==== Vietnam ====
The Jaecoo J7 was launched in Vietnam on 15 January 2025 in two variants: Flagship and Flagship PHEV. It is powered by either a 1.6-litre turbocharged petrol or a 1.5-litre turbocharged petrol plug-in hybrid only with front-wheel drive. In November 2025, the AWD Individual variant using the 1.6-litre turbocharged petrol added to the line-up.

=== South Asia ===
==== Bangladesh ====
In May 2024 Asian MotorSpeX Limited a Dhaka based automotive company and the official distributor of Jaecoo and Omoda unveiled Jaecoo J7 at 17th Dhaka Motor Show 2024. Only the PHEV variants of the Jaecoo J7 is available in the country. With the Jaecoo J7 they also unveiled the Omoda E5 and C5.

==== Pakistan ====
In October 2025 Nishat Motors and Chery launched the Jaecoo J7 under their new brand OMODA & JAECOO assembled in their Faisalabad facility in Pakistan. Only PHEV variant of the SUV is available on sale power by a 1.5 turbo petrol engine coupled with electric motor and Dedicated Hybrid Transmission with output of 342 hp and 525 Nm torque.

==== Sri Lanka ====
In January 2025 Hayleys Mobility Limited and Chery launched their brand OMODA & JAECOO with their first outlet in Colombo the largest city and capital of Sri Lanka. The group launched electric, hybrid and Combustion Engine models for both brands Omoda & Jaecoo. J5, 6, 7 and 8 from Jaecoo, E5, C5 and C9 from Omoda.

== Sales ==
Year	Malaysia	Brazil	Australia	Indonesia
2024	7,041			
2025	11,520	4,925	2,706	716
