= Jaecoo =

Marque of vehicle manufacturer Chery

- Type: Division
- Industry: Automotive
- Founded: April 2023; 3 years ago
- Headquarters: Wuhu, Anhui, China
- Area served: Worldwide (except China & US)
- Key people: Shawn Xu (Omoda & Jaecoo CEO)
- Products: Automobiles
- Parent: Chery Automobile
- Website: omodajaecoo.com

Jaecoo (/dʒæˈkuː, dʒeɪˈkuː/) is a brand of Chinese vehicle manufacturer Chery Automobile that was established in 2023. A sub-division of Chery International, Jaecoo was created to market SUVs in export markets. Along with its sister brand Omoda, it is exclusively sold outside China to support Chery's export strategy.

The name is a portmanteau of the German word Jäger (meaning 'hunter') and the English word 'cool'. In Iran, the brand is known as Lucano.

== History ==
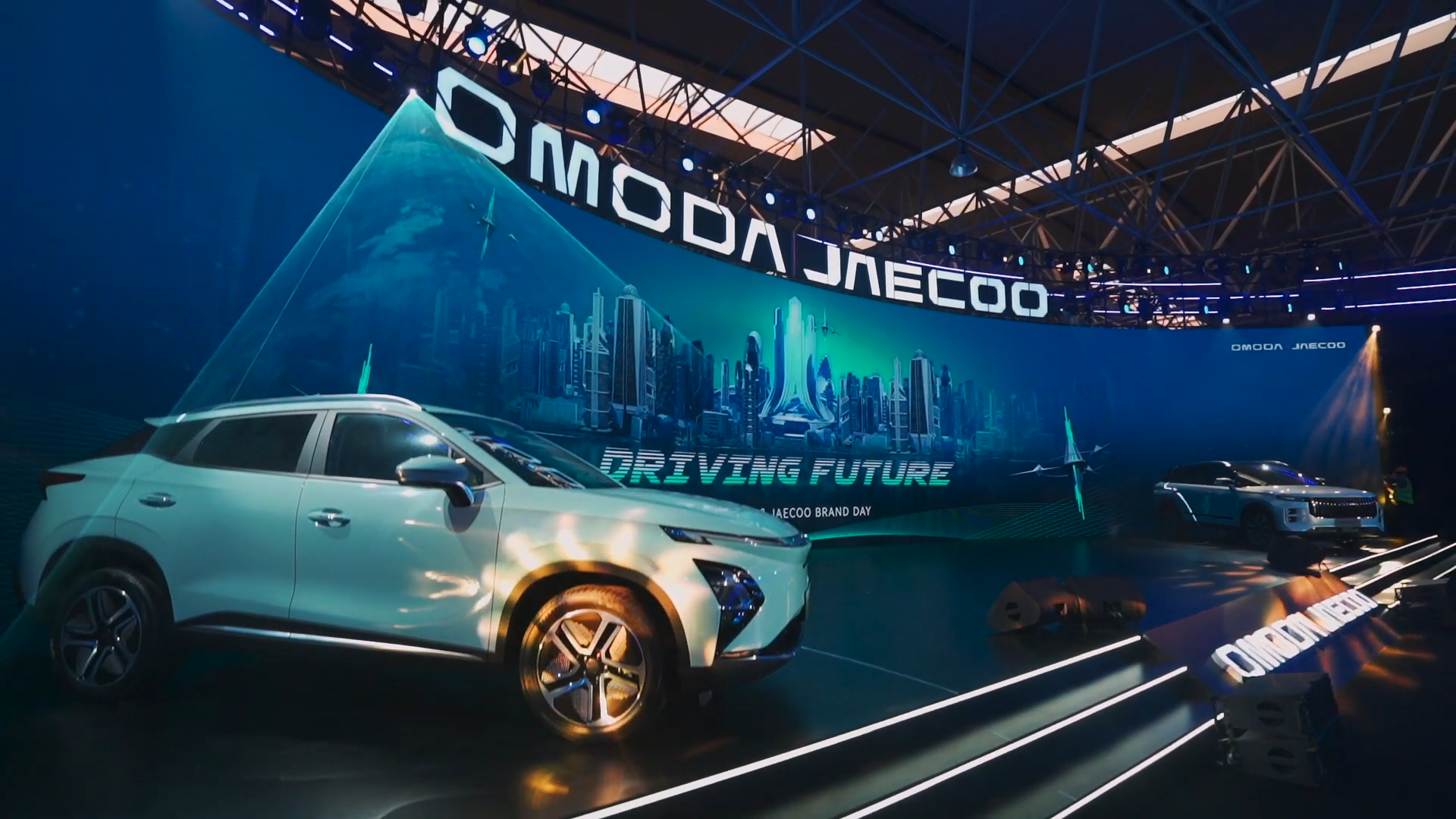
Omoda and Jaecoo brand launch in Wuhu, Anhui, April 2023

Jaecoo was first introduced in April 2023 in Wuhu, Anhui], China, alongside the Omoda brand. The two brands (referred to as "O&J" brands) are only marketed outside China to support its export strategy. Both brands were targeted to reach annual global sales of 1,400,000 units by 2030 (excluding China). In the same month, Chery established a separate company in China called Anhui Omoda Jaecoo Automobile Co., Ltd. as a sales company.

During the brand introduction in April 2023, Jaecoo unveiled two models: the Jaecoo 7, a rebadged Chery Tansuo 06, and Jaecoo 9, a rebadged Chery Tiggo 9, which was later renamed Jaecoo J8 or Jaecoo 8. Jaecoo began sales in Russia, its first market, in September 2023 with the J7 and J8. Throughout 2024, Jaecoo expanded to several markets, including Western Europe, Malaysia, the Middle East, South Africa, and Chile.

In April 2024, the brand introduced the Jaecoo J6 EV, a rebadged iCar 03, at a brand convention in China. In October 2024, Jaecoo previewed its fourth and smallest model, the Jaecoo J5 subcompact SUV. The electric version of the J5, the J5 EV, debuted in Indonesia in February 2025.

By August 2025, 27 months after their brand introduction, Omoda and Jaecoo had jointly reached 600,000 vehicle sales worldwide. Combined cumulative sales surpassed one million units by April 2026, coinciding with the brand's appearance at Auto China 2026.

Jaecoo was named Carwow's Brand of the Year for 2026 in the United Kingdom.

== Markets ==
=== Europe ===
==== Russia ====
Jaecoo vehicles went on sale in Russia in September 2023, starting with the Jaecoo J7, making it the first market to receive Jaecoo products. The brand became the fifth Chery Holding marque in the country after Chery, Exeed, Omoda, and Jetour.

In February 2026, AGR Holding and its Chinese partner Defetoo announced a new brand, Jeland, which will market locally produced versions of Jaecoo models in Russia. The announcement coincided with reports of AGR resuming operations at the former General Motors plant in Shushary, Saint Petersburg, where production of Jaecoo-based vehicles had been established. Production under the Jeland brand was planned to begin in the first half of 2026, with localised versions of the Jaecoo J6, J7, and J8 expected to form the initial model range; the J7 is expected to be sold as the Jeland VT7. In March 2026, the first welded body for the Jeland brand was produced at the Shushary facility, marking the beginning of body production ahead of full assembly. Jeland is expected to be Jaecoo's second joint project with AGR after Tenet, which involves localised Jaecoo-based production at the former Volkswagen site in Kaluga.

==== Italy ====
Chery officially debuted in Italy in July 2024 with the Jaecoo brand alongside Omoda, launching the Jaecoo 7. At the time of launch, there were 49 active dealerships.

==== Spain ====
Jaecoo entered Spain as part of its broader Western European expansion in 2024. Cumulative registrations in Spain reached 1,318 units in the first two months of 2026, a 38% year-on-year increase, with the J7 SHS plug-in hybrid leading sales.

==== United Kingdom ====
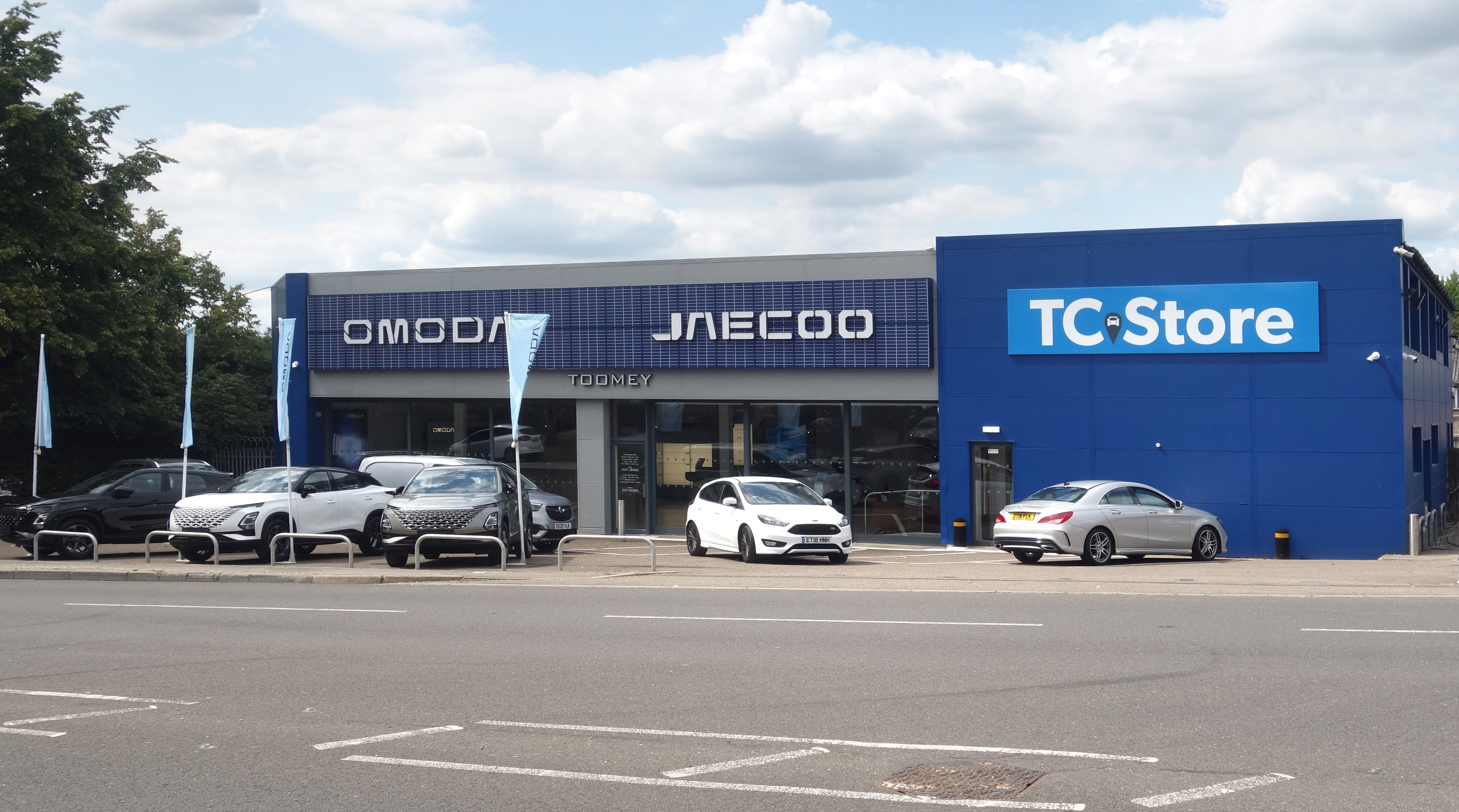
An Omoda-Jaecoo dealership in Brentwood, Essex, UK

The Jaecoo J7 became available to order in the UK in January 2025, distributed through the Omoda-Jaecoo dealership network which already sells the Omoda 5 series. Jaecoo registered 28,232 new cars in the UK in 2025, making it the fastest-growing mainstream automotive brand in the country over the past decade according to SMMT data; the J7 SHS plug-in hybrid accounted for 70% of all J7 sales that year. The brand was also named Carwow Brand of the Year and ranked as the most-searched Chinese car brand on Google in the UK for 2025. The Jaecoo J5 launched in the UK in 2026, joined by the battery electric Jaecoo E5 variant.

=== Southeast Asia ===
==== Malaysia ====
Jaecoo debuted in Malaysia in December 2023, by showcasing the Jaecoo J7. In June 2024, the first Jaecoo J7 rolled off the production line at Chery's Malaysian plant in Shah Alam, which is dedicated for Jaecoo models. The Jaecoo J7 went on sale in July 2024. Jaecoo Malaysia introduced its second model, the Omoda C9, a rebadged Exeed Yaoguang/RX, in December 2024. The model does not use Jaecoo badging, but marketed as "Omoda C9 by Jaecoo".

==== Thailand ====
Jaecoo was introduced in Thailand in March 2024, alongside the Omoda brand. The Jaecoo J6 EV opened for booking in August 2024.

==== Indonesia ====
Jaecoo held its brand launch in Indonesia on 20 January 2025, showcasing the Jaecoo J7 as its first model to be sold in the country. In February 2025, at the 32nd Indonesia International Motor Show, Jaecoo also showcased the Jaecoo J8 and Jaecoo J5 EV (which made the world debut at the country). In July 2025, Jaecoo Indonesia held the world premiere of the Jaecoo J8 SHS ARDIS, the plug-in hybrid version, shortly before the 32nd Indonesia International Auto Show.

=== Pakistan ===
Jaecoo entered Pakistan in August 2025 through a partnership with Nishat Automobile. In October 2025, Nishat Automobile showcased the Jaecoo J7 PHEV variant in the country, with assembly taking place at the Hyundai Nishat Motor facility in Faisalabad. Pakistan is among the first markets globally to receive the Jaecoo J5 SHS hybrid variant.

=== Oceania ===
==== Australia ====
The Jaecoo brand launched in Australia in May 2025. The first vehicle in the lineup is the Jaecoo J7. It is expected that further Jaecoo models will join the lineup in time, with the Jaecoo J8 listed on the Jaecoo Australia website and taking expressions of interest for potential buyers. Jaecoo is offering an 8-year, unlimited kilometer warranty at launch.

==== New Zealand ====
The Jaecoo brand launched in New Zealand with the Jaecoo J7 offered from late April 2025.

=== North America ===
==== Canada ====
The Omoda and Jaecoo brands launched in Canada in October 2026, with the Jaecoo J5 and ET on sale from 2027.

== Products ==
=== Current models ===
The first model of Jaecoo is the J7, a rebadged Chery Tansuo 06, and was followed by the J8 (a rebadged Chery Tiggo 9) in October 2023 at the Geneva Motor Show in Qatar. The third model of Jaecoo is the J6, rebranded from the iCar 03. The fourth model of Jaecoo is the J5.

- Jaecoo 5/J5/J6 (2025–present)
  - Jaecoo 5/J5 SHS-H (hybrid, 2026–present)
  - Jaecoo 5/J5 EV/E5 (battery electric, 2025–present)
- Jaecoo J6/6 EV/EJ6 (2024–present), rebadged iCar 03
- Jaecoo J7/7 (2023–present), rebadged Chery Tansuo 06 / Tiggo 7 High Energy
  - Jaecoo 7/J7 SHS-P/PHEV (plug-in hybrid, 2024–present)
  - Jaecoo 7 Hybrid/J7 SHS-H (hybrid, 2026–present)
- Jaecoo J8/8 (2023–present), rebadged Chery Tiggo 9
  - Jaecoo J8 SHS (plug-in hybrid, 2025–present)
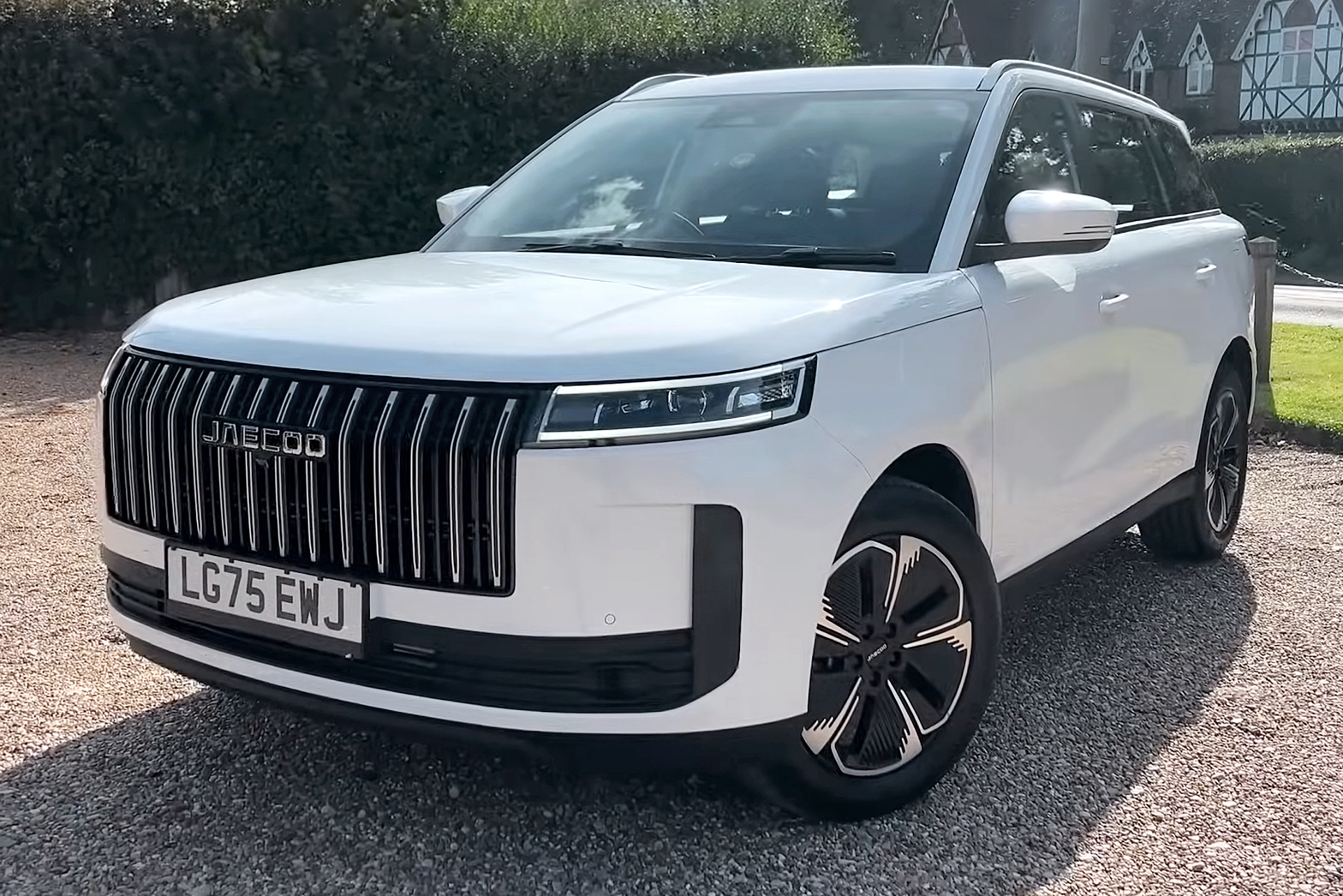
Jaecoo J5

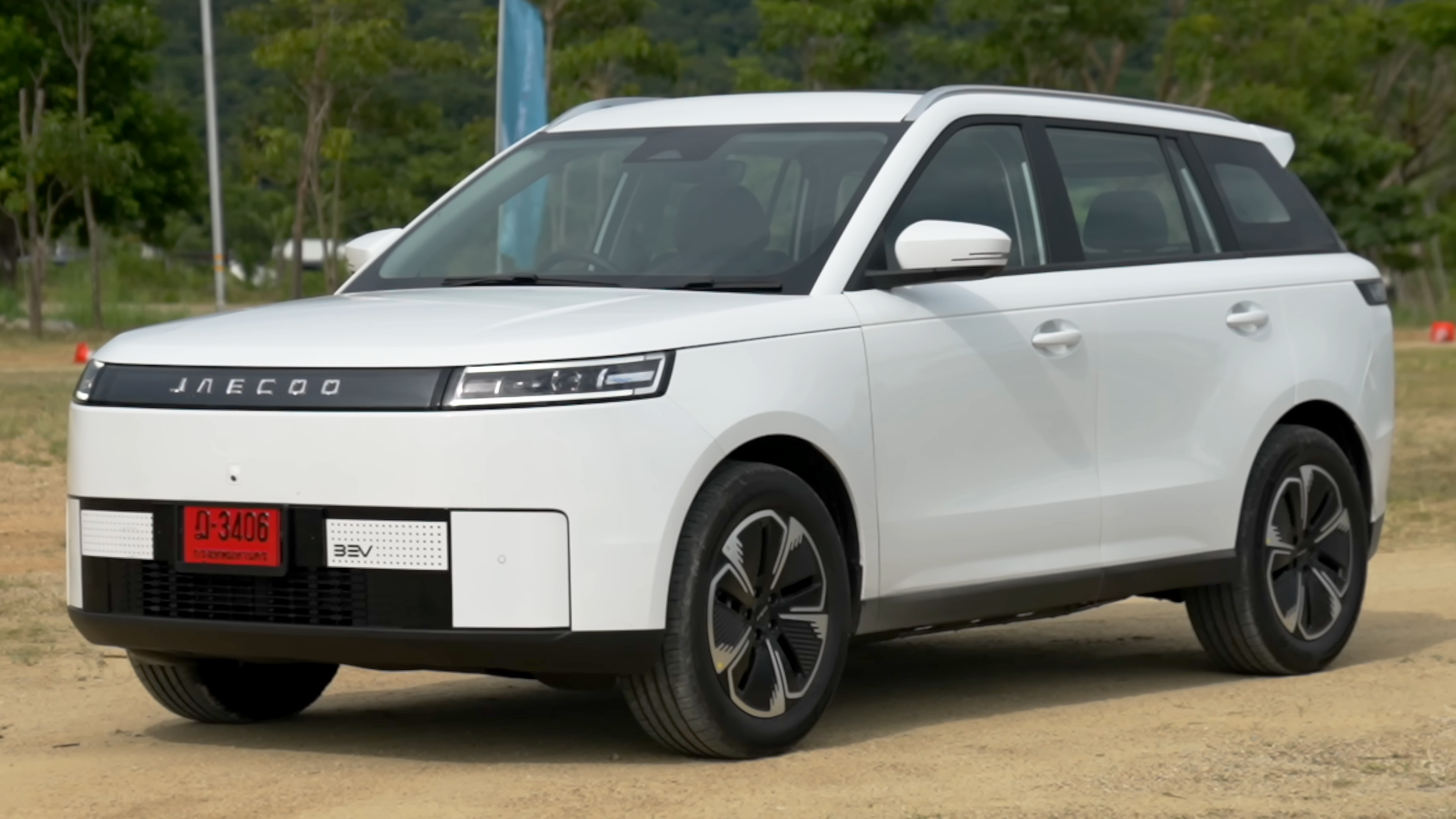
Jaecoo J5 EV

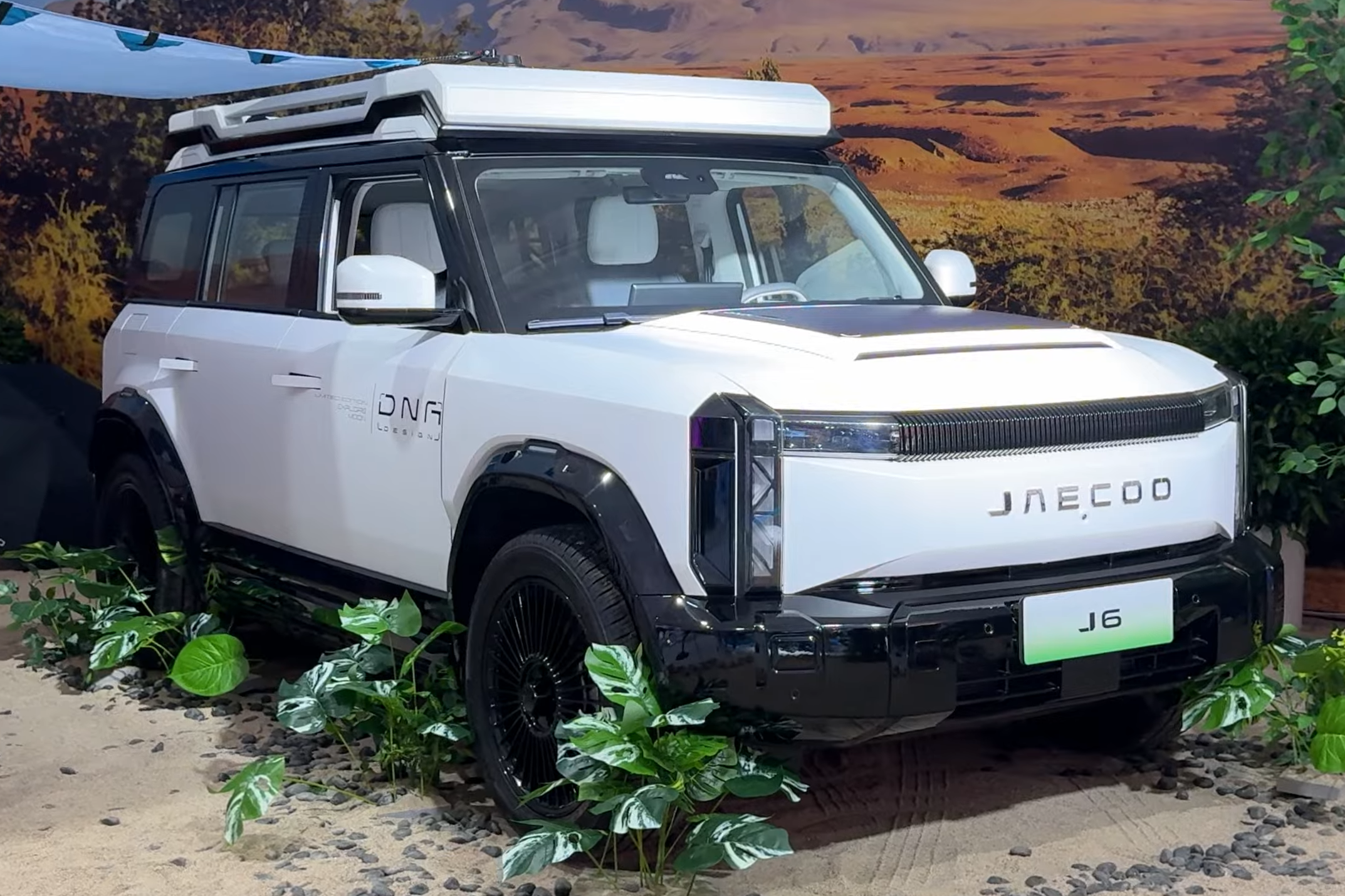
Jaecoo J6

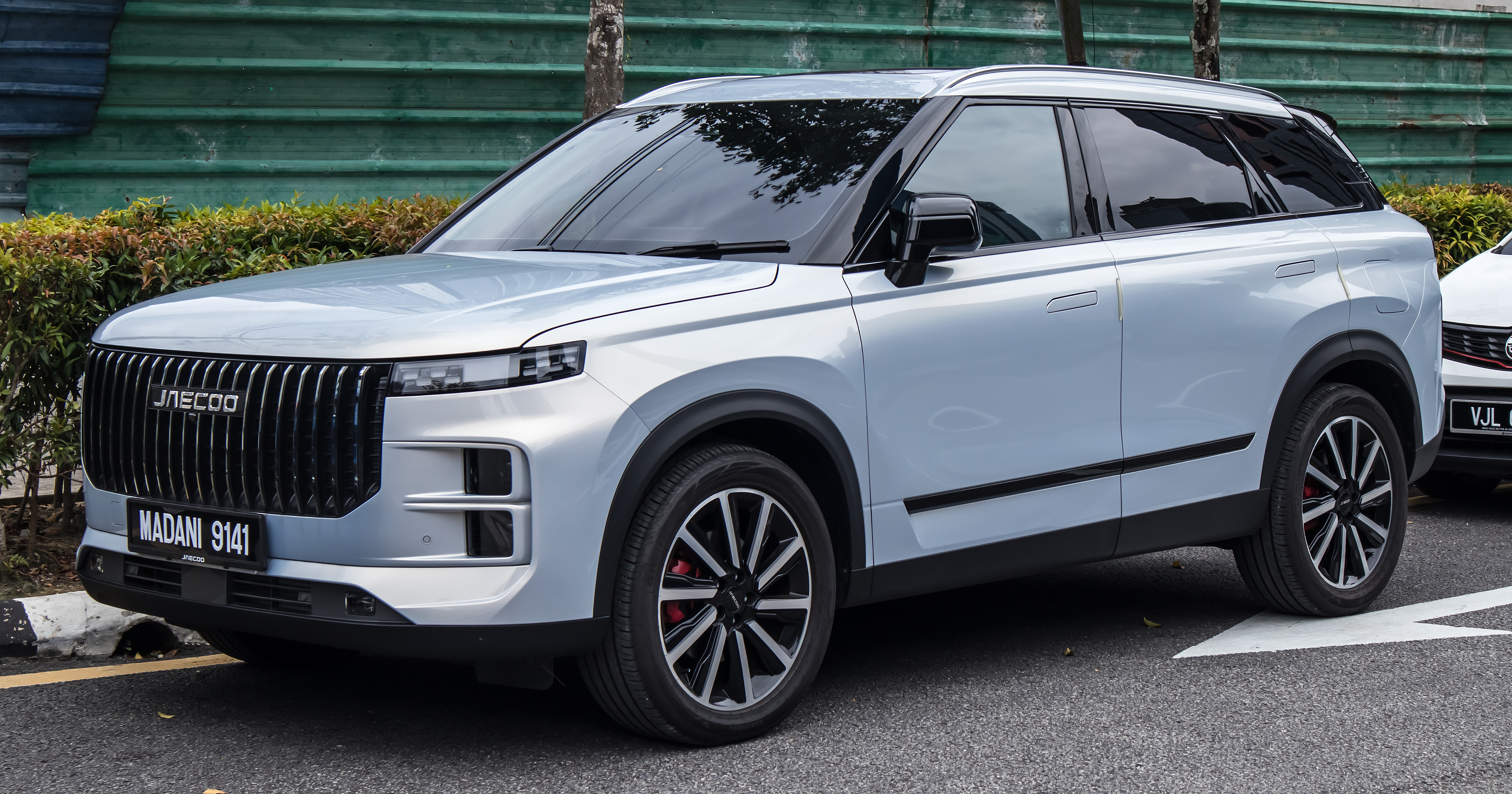
Jaecoo J7

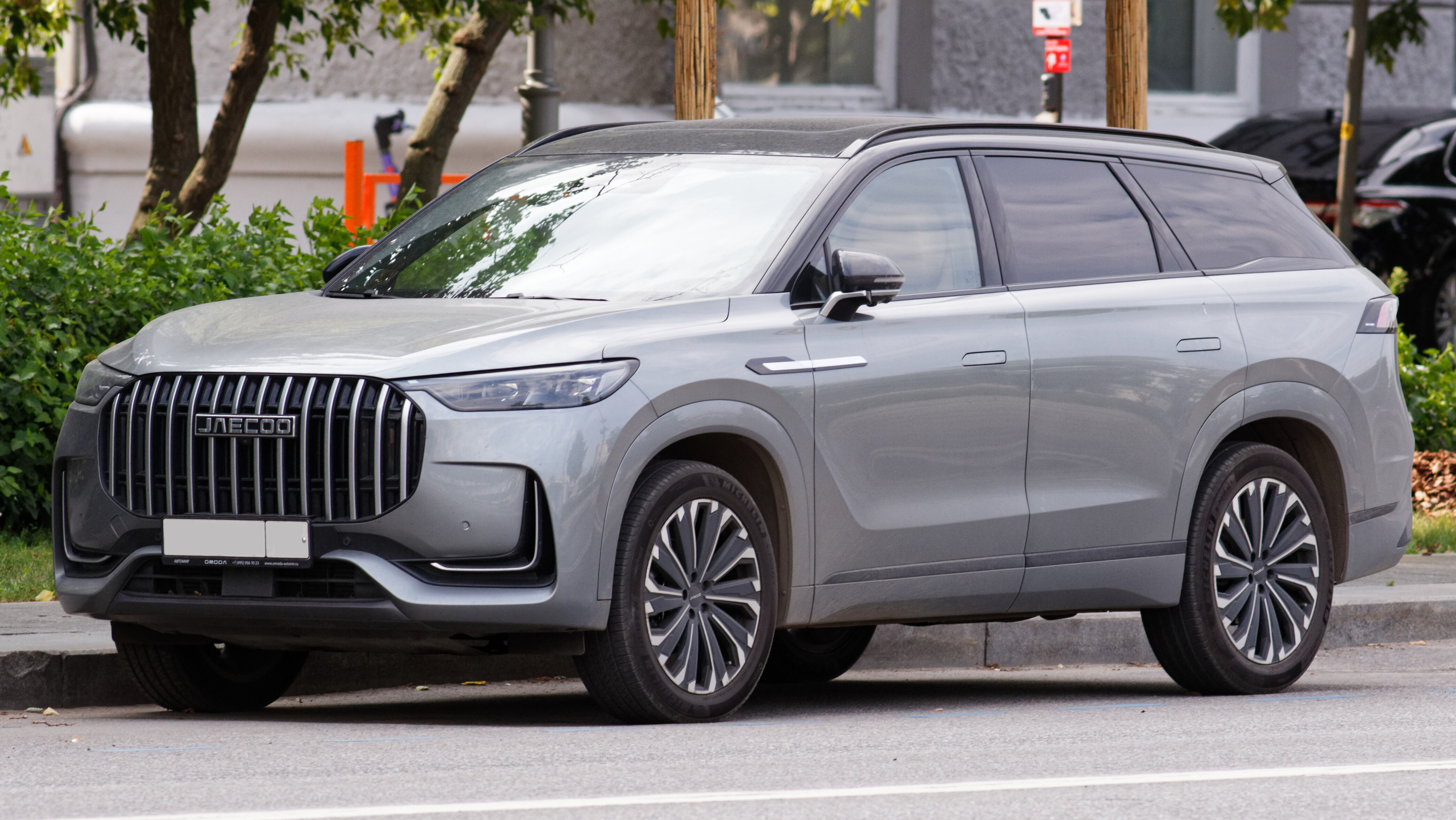
Jaecoo J8

== See also ==
- Omoda
- Lepas
- Jetour
- Exeed
- Luxeed
- Exlantix
- iCar
- Karry
