= Jaecoo J5 =

Compact SUV

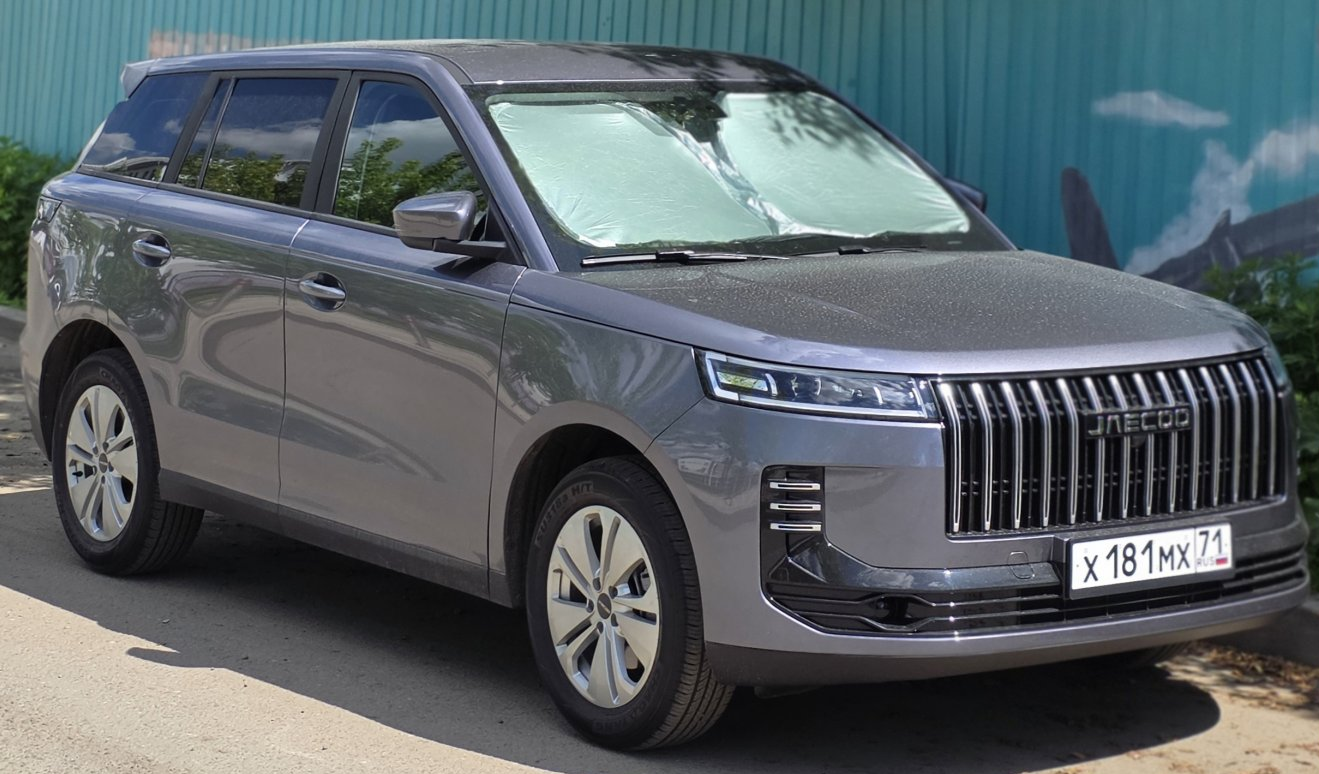
- 2026 Jaecoo J6 (Russia)

Overview
- Manufacturer: Chery
- Model code: T13J
- Also called: Jaecoo 5; Jaecoo J5/5 EV (electric); Jaecoo E5 (electric, Europe); Jaecoo J6 (Russia); Jeland J6 (Russia); Lucano L5 (Iran)
- Production: 2025–present
- Assembly: China: Wuhu, Anhui; Indonesia: Bekasi, West Java (HIM); Bogor, West Java (Inchcape Indomobil); Thailand: Rayong; Russia: Shushary, St. Petersburg (AGR Holding); Iran: Savojbolagh, Alborz (Mammut Group)

Body and chassis
- Class: Compact SUV (C-segment)
- Body style: 5-door crossover SUV
- Layout: Front-engine, front-wheel-drive; Front-engine, all-wheel-drive (Russia); Front-motor, front-wheel-drive (EV)
- Platform: T1X platform
- Chassis: Unibody
- Related: Chery Tiggo 5x; Omoda C5; Omoda O4; Lepas L4

Powertrain
- Engine: Petrol: 1.5 L SQRE4T15C turbo I4; 1.6 L SQRF4J16 turbo I4; Petrol hybrid: 1.5 L E4T15B I4 (SHS-H)
- Electric motor: Permanent magnet synchronous motor
- Power output: 108 kW (145 hp; 147 PS); 155 kW (208 hp; 211 PS) (EV)
- Transmission: 7-speed dual-clutch; CVT; DHT (SHS-H)
- Hybrid drivetrain: Series-parallel hybrid (SHS-H)
- Battery: 50.6 kWh LFP (EV); 58.9 kWh LFP (EV); 60.93 kWh LFP (EV)
- Electric range: 401–480 km (249–298 mi) (NEDC); 400 km (249 mi) (WLTC)

Dimensions
- Wheelbase: 2,620 mm (103.1 in)
- Length: 4,380 mm (172.4 in)
- Width: 1,860 mm (73.2 in)
- Height: 1,650 mm (65.0 in)

The Jaecoo J5 (also known as Jaecoo 5) is a Compact SUV (C-segment) produced by Chery under the Jaecoo brand since 2025. It is available with petrol, petrol hybrid (SHS-H), and battery electric (EV) powertrain options.

== Design ==
The exterior of the Jaecoo J5 features a simplified front fascia design that includes the trademark 'waterfall' grille (only for petrol and SHS-H models), conventional door handles, a suspended roof design, and a full-width taillight bar connected by a black trim piece bearing the brand name. In contrast to the combustion-engine model, the battery electric model showcases a distinct front fascia design with a transparent trim piece displaying the brand name, as well as a different bumper design that incorporates an air intake. Similarly to the larger J7, the J5 has been dubbed the "Temu Range Rover" due to its styling and price tag. Jaecoo's parent Chery has a joint venture with Jaguar Land Rover in China.

Inside, the interior has a minimalistic approach with fewer buttons on the dashboard and features a waterfall-style centre console. The dashboard features a 13.2-inch portrait touchscreen infotainment system, a digital instrument panel, the gear lever used for the automatic transmission is mounted on the steering wheel, and a two-spoke design steering wheel derived from the Omoda C9. Other interior features include a 1.45m² panoramic glass roof, customisable ambient lighting, dual smartphone holders includes a Qi wireless charger, and a storage area under the centre console. Jaecoo claims the J5 is a "pet-friendly" SUV with features such as an antibacterial "health device" prevents any bacterial growth inside the car, a cabin air filter that sucks out pet hair from the air, extended seats, and an "intelligent" temperate control system.

The J5 has a boot space of 480 L (17 cu ft) and expands to 1,180 L (42 cu ft) when the rear seats are folded.

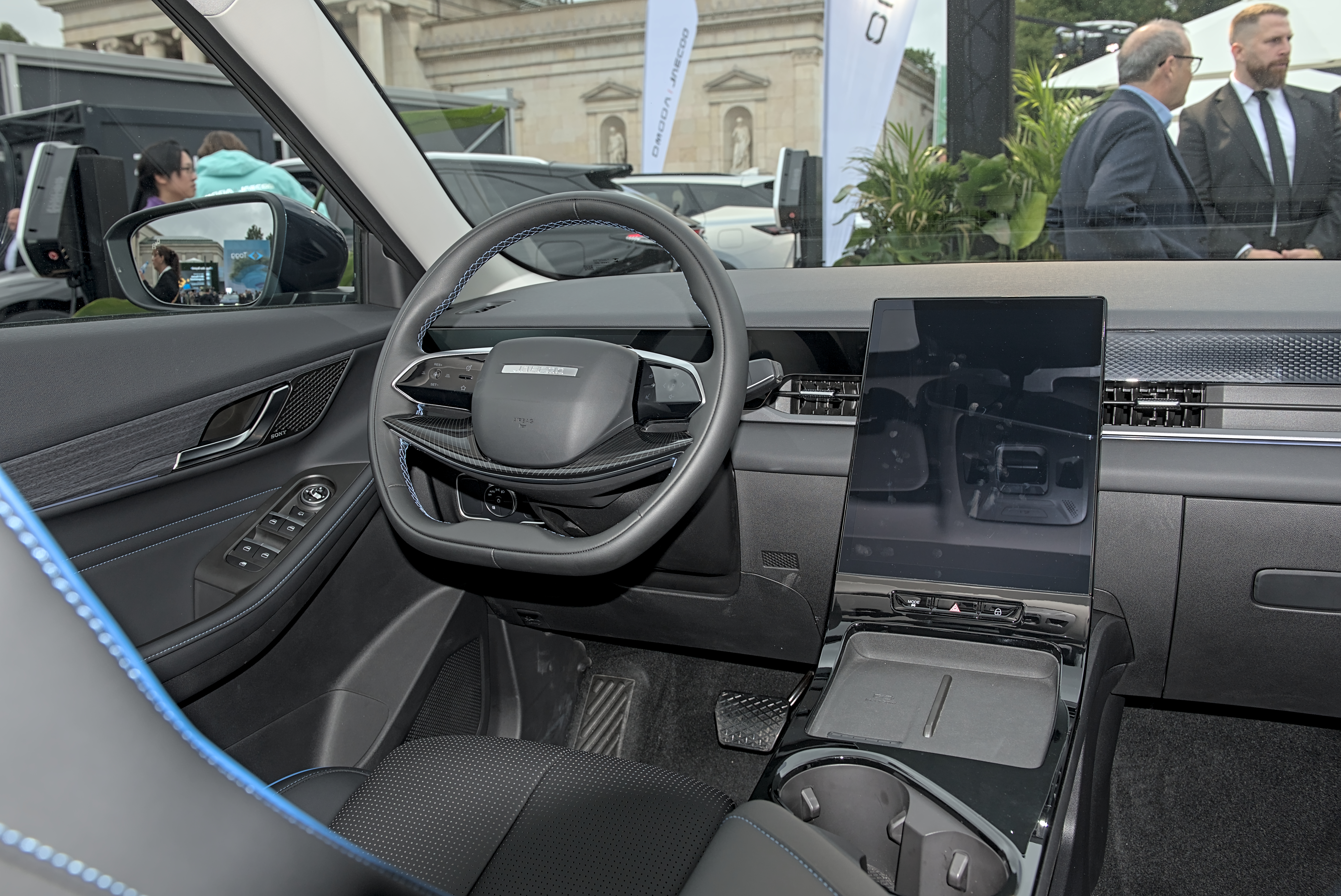
Interior

== J5 EV ==
The J5 EV was previewed as a prototype model at the 2025 Indonesia International Motor Show, and as a production model at the 2025 Shanghai Auto Show.

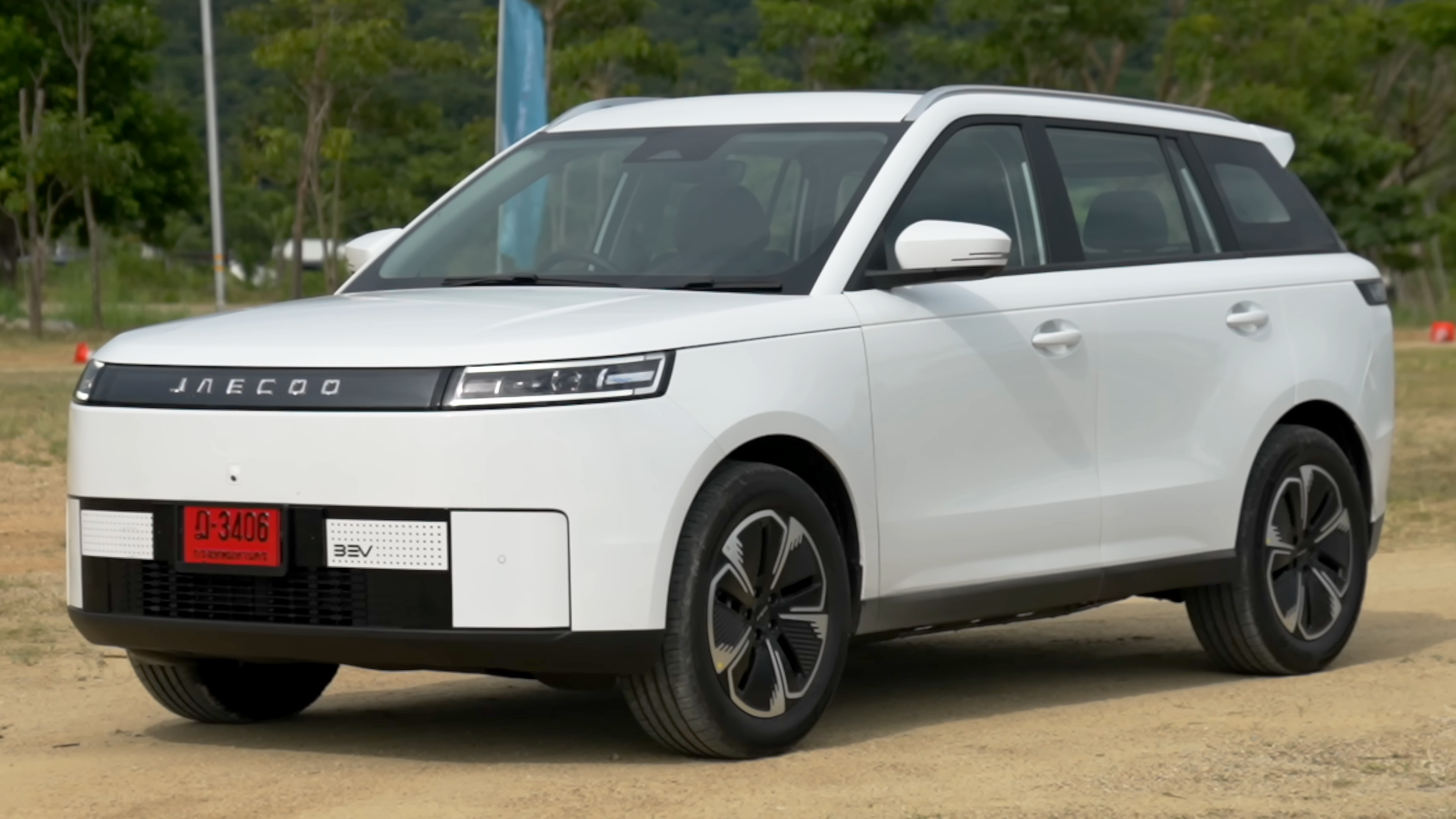
Jaecoo J5 EV

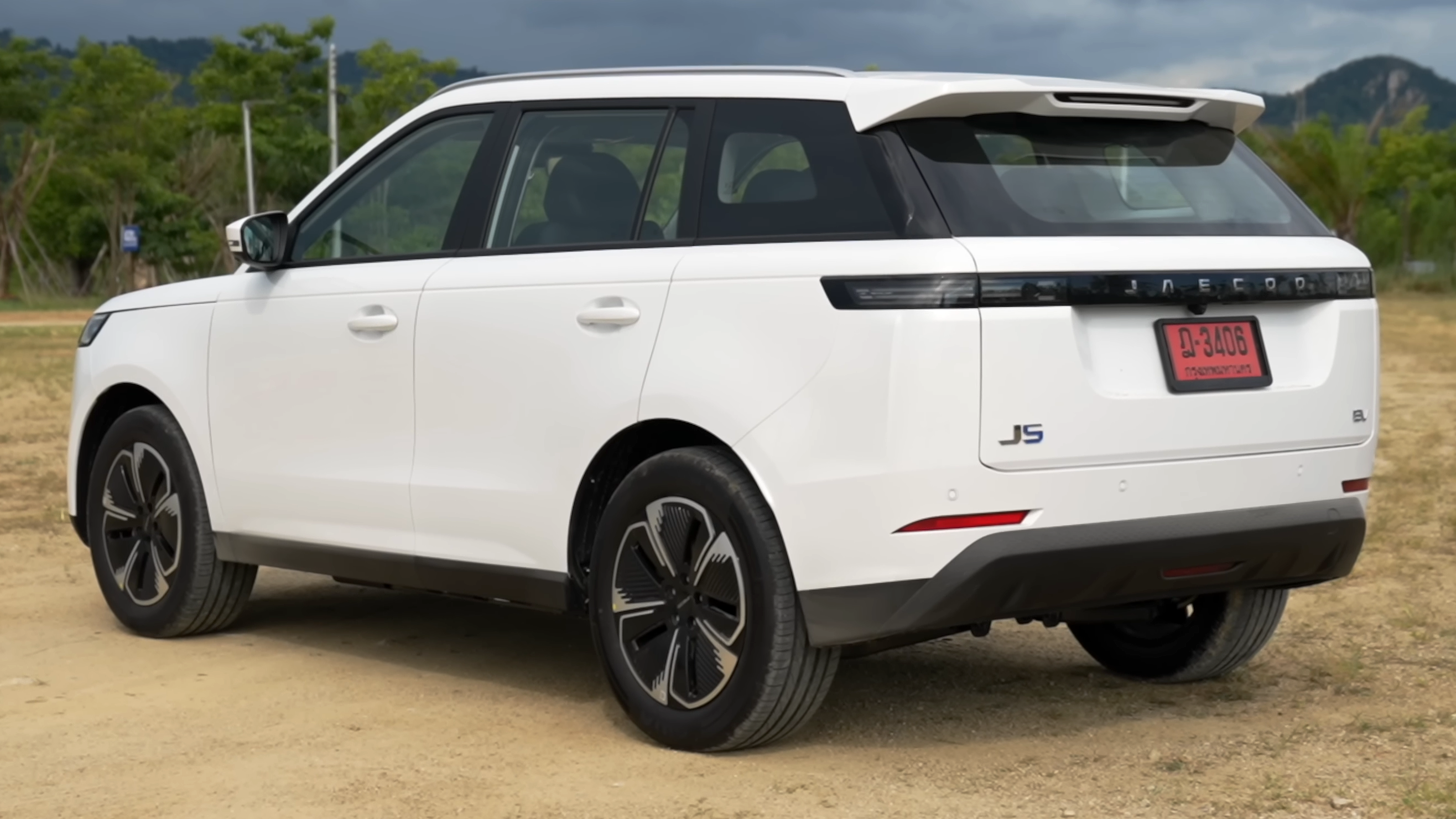
Rear view

=== Powertrain ===
Battery	Layout	Electric motor	Power	Torque	0–100 km/h (62 mph)	Range (claimed)		Calendar years
Type	Layout	Electric motor	Power	Torque	0–100 km/h (62 mph)	NEDC	WLTP	Calendar years
50.6 kWh LFP CATL	FWD	PMSM	155 kW (208 hp; 211 PS)	288 N⋅m (29.4 kg⋅m; 212 lb⋅ft)	7.7 sec	401 km (249 mi)		2026–present (Thailand)
58.9 kWh LFP CATL	FWD	PMSM	155 kW (208 hp; 211 PS)	288 N⋅m (29.4 kg⋅m; 212 lb⋅ft)	7.7 sec	461 km (286 mi)	402 km (250 mi)	2025–present
60.93 kWh LFP CATL	FWD	PMSM	155 kW (208 hp; 211 PS)	288 N⋅m (29.4 kg⋅m; 212 lb⋅ft)	7.7 sec	480 km (298 mi)		2026–present (Thailand)

== Markets ==
=== Asia ===
==== Indonesia ====
The J5 EV was launched in Indonesia on 25 July 2025 at the 32nd Gaikindo Indonesia International Auto Show, with two variants: Standard and Premium, both variants use the 58.9 kWh battery pack (marketed as 60.9 kWh).

==== Iran ====
Jaecoo J5 was unveiled in Iran on July 2026, marketed as the Lucano L5. This car will be offered in the Iranian market with a 1.5-liter turbocharged petrol engine paired with a 6-speed dual-clutch gearbox.

==== Malaysia ====
The J5 was launched in Malaysia on 5 March 2026, in the sole 2WD variant powered by the 1.5-litre turbocharged petrol paired with a CVT.

The J5 EV was launched in Malaysia on 2 September 2026, in the sole variant using the 58.9 kWh battery pack.

==== Pakistan ====
The J5 was launched in Pakistan on 11 January 2026, with two variants: Comfort and Premium, both variants are powered by the 1.5-litre turbocharged petrol hybrid (SHS).

==== Philippines ====
The J5 was launched in the Philippines on 8 April 2026, with two variants: Comfort and Luxury, both variants are powered by the 1.5-litre turbocharged petrol hybrid (SHS-H).

The J5 EV made its Philippine debut at the 2026 Philippine International Motor Show, with sales commencing on 22 July 2026, available in the sole variant using the 58.9 kWh battery pack.

==== Singapore ====
The Jaecoo 5 EV was launched in Singapore on 6 May 2026, in the sole variant using the 58.9 kWh battery pack.

==== Thailand ====
The J5 EV was launched in Thailand on 19 August 2025, in two variants: Long Range Dynamic and Long Range Max, both using a 58.9 kWh battery pack.

In March 2026, the J5 EV began local assembly for the Thai market, offered in a sole Max+ variant using a smaller 50.6 kWh battery pack. Compared with the China-imported model, the locally assembled version features a reduced battery capacity (down from 58.9 to 50.6 kWh) with an electric range of 401 km (249 mi), reduced AC charging capacity (from 11 to 6.6 kW), an 8-inch digital instrument cluster in place of the larger unit, and a single black interior colour option.

In August 2026, the Ultra variant using a larger 60.9 kWh battery pack was introduced to the line-up as a locally assembled variant.

==== Vietnam ====
The J5 was launched in Vietnam on 14 August 2026, with four variants: Premium, SHS-H Premium, SHS-H Flagship, and EV Flagship.

=== Europe ===
The Jaecoo 5 made its European debut in July 2025 at the 2025 Goodwood Festival of Speed, with deliveries commenced in October 2025. In the UK, it is available with two trim levels: Pure and Luxury. At launch, the Jaecoo 5 was available with the 1.6-litre turbocharged petrol paired with a 7-speed DCT and a battery electric version marketed in Europe as the Jaecoo E5.

In April 2026, the hybrid version using the 1.5-litre turbocharged petrol hybrid (SHS) was introduced in Europe.

=== Latin America ===
==== Brazil ====
The Jaecoo 5 was launched in Brazil on 30 September 2026, with two variants: Comfort and Prestige, both variants are powered by the 1.5-litre turbocharged petrol hybrid (SHS-H).

==== Mexico ====
The Jaecoo 5 was launched in Mexico on 15 October 2025, with two trim levels: Elemental and Inspire, powered by the 1.5-litre turbocharged petrol paired with a CVT.

=== Oceania ===
==== Australia ====
The J5 EV was launched in Australia on 23 December 2025, in the sole variant uses the 58.9 kWh battery pack.

In April 2026, the J5 petrol version using the 1.6-litre turbocharged petrol paired with a CVT was introduced in Australia and is available in Track and Summit trims.

In July 2026, the J5 hybrid version using the 1.5-litre turbocharged petrol hybrid (SHS-H) was introduced in Australia and is available solely in the Summit trim.

=== South Africa ===
The J5 was launched in South Africa on 12 September 2025, with three trim levels: Vortex, Glacier and Inferno, powered by the 1.5-litre turbocharged petrol paired with a CVT. In December 2025, the entry-level Core trim powered by the same 1.5-litre turbocharged petrol was added to the line-up.

In July 2026, the J5 BEV was introduced in South Africa as the flagship variant using the 58.9 kWh battery pack.

In September 2026, the J5 hybrid version using the 1.5-litre turbocharged petrol hybrid (SHS-H) was introduced in South Africa, in the sole variant below the Inferno variant.

== Sales ==
Year	Indonesia
2025	1,663
