= International Auto Show =

International Auto Show may refer to one of these auto shows:

== Asia ==
- Indonesia International Auto Show
- Manila International Auto Show

== Canada ==
- Canadian International AutoShow
- Montreal International Auto Show

== United States ==
- Alabama International Auto Show
- First Hawaiian International Auto Show
- Memphis International Auto Show
- Miami International Auto Show
- Nashville International Auto and Truck Show
- New York International Auto Show
- North American International Auto Show
- Portland International Auto Show

== See also ==
- International Motor Show (disambiguation)
