= International Motor Show =

International Motor Show may refer to one of these motor shows:

- Australian International Motor Show
- Bangkok International Motor Show
- British International Motor Show
- Dubai International Motor Show
- Frankfurt International Motor Show
- Indonesia International Motor Show
- Philippine International Motor Show

== See also ==
- International Auto Show (disambiguation)
