= Chery Tiggo 5x =

Compact crossover SUV

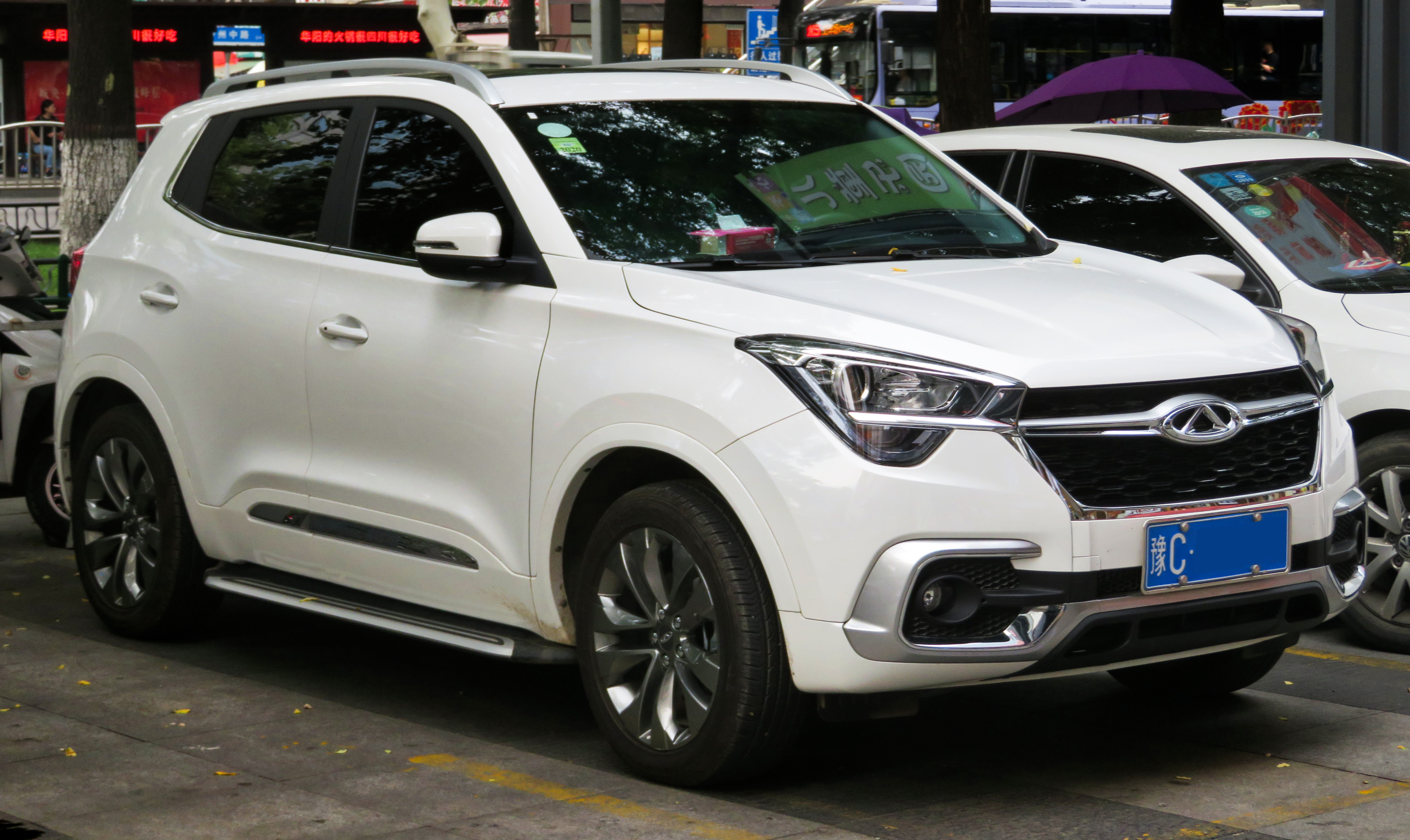
- Pre-facelift

Overview
- Manufacturer: Chery
- Also called: Chery Tiggo 3; Chery Tiggo 4; Chirey Tiggo 4 (Mexico); Chery Tiggo Cross (South Africa and Southeast Asia, 2024–present); Chery Tiggo e (EV); DR 5.0 (Italy); DR 4.0 (Italy, 2022–2024); Sportequipe 5 (Italy); MVM X55/X55 Pro/X5 (Iran); Tenet T4 (Russia, 2025–present); Ebro S400 (Spain)
- Production: 2017–present
- Assembly: China: Wuhu, Anhui; Brazil: Anápolis, Goiás (Caoa Chery); Egypt: Abu Rawash, Giza (GB Corp, Prima Plant); Indonesia: Bekasi, West Java (HIM); Iran: Bam, Kerman Province (MVM); Pakistan: Karachi (Ghandhara Nissan); Malaysia: Kulim, Kedah (Inokom); Russia: Kaluga (AGR, Tenet T4)
- Designer: Frederik Dallmeyer

Body and chassis
- Class: Compact crossover SUV (C)
- Body style: 5-door SUV
- Layout: Front-engine, front-wheel-drive
- Platform: T1X
- Related: Chery Tiggo 7; Chery Tiggo 8; Kaiyi Showjet; Chery Omoda 5; Jaecoo J5

Powertrain
- Engine: Petrol: 1.5 L E4G15C I4; 1.5 L E4T15B I4 turbo; 1.5 L E4T15C I4 turbo; 2.0 L 484F I4; Petrol hybrid: 1.5 L E4T15B I4 (CSH Hybrid)
- Electric motor: Hybrid: 48 V belt starter generator; CSH Hybrid: Permanent magnet synchronous; Tiggo e: 127 hp (95 kW) permanent magnet motor/generator
- Transmission: 6-speed manual; 6-speed DCT; 9-speed CVT; DHT (DHT150, CSH Hybrid)
- Hybrid drivetrain: Mild hybrid; Series-parallel hybrid (CSH Hybrid)
- Battery: 1.8 kWh LFP battery (CSH Hybrid); 53.6 kWh lithium-ion (Tiggo e)
- Electric range: 401 kilometres (249 mi) (NEDC) (Tiggo e)

Dimensions
- Wheelbase: 2,630 mm (103.5 in)
- Length: 4,338 mm (170.8 in)
- Width: 1,830 mm (72.0 in)
- Height: 1,645 mm (64.8 in)
- Curb weight: 1,376 kg (3,034 lb)

Chronology
- Predecessor: Chery Tiggo 5 (numerical); Chery Tiggo 3 (in some markets, like South America and Italy)

The Chery Tiggo 5x (Chinese: 奇瑞瑞虎5x; pinyin: Qíruì Ruìhǔ 5x), also known in most global markets as the Chery Tiggo 4, is a subcompact crossover SUV produced by the Chinese automaker Chery Automobile since 2017. It is the fifth model of the company's Tiggo crossover product series.

== Overview ==
The design of the Tiggo 5x was originally previewed by the Concept Beta that was first displayed in April 2014 at the 2014 Beijing Auto Show.

The Tiggo 5x went on sale in China on the second half of 2017, positioned between the subcompact Tiggo 3x and the compact Tiggo 3. Much like the marketing position of the Tiggo 3x, the Tiggo 5x is the sportier version of the Tiggo 5 despite being a completely different model. Its platform would be later shared by the Cowin Showjet in 2019.

In China, the Tiggo 5x was sold with a single engine option, a 1.5-litre inline-4 engine.

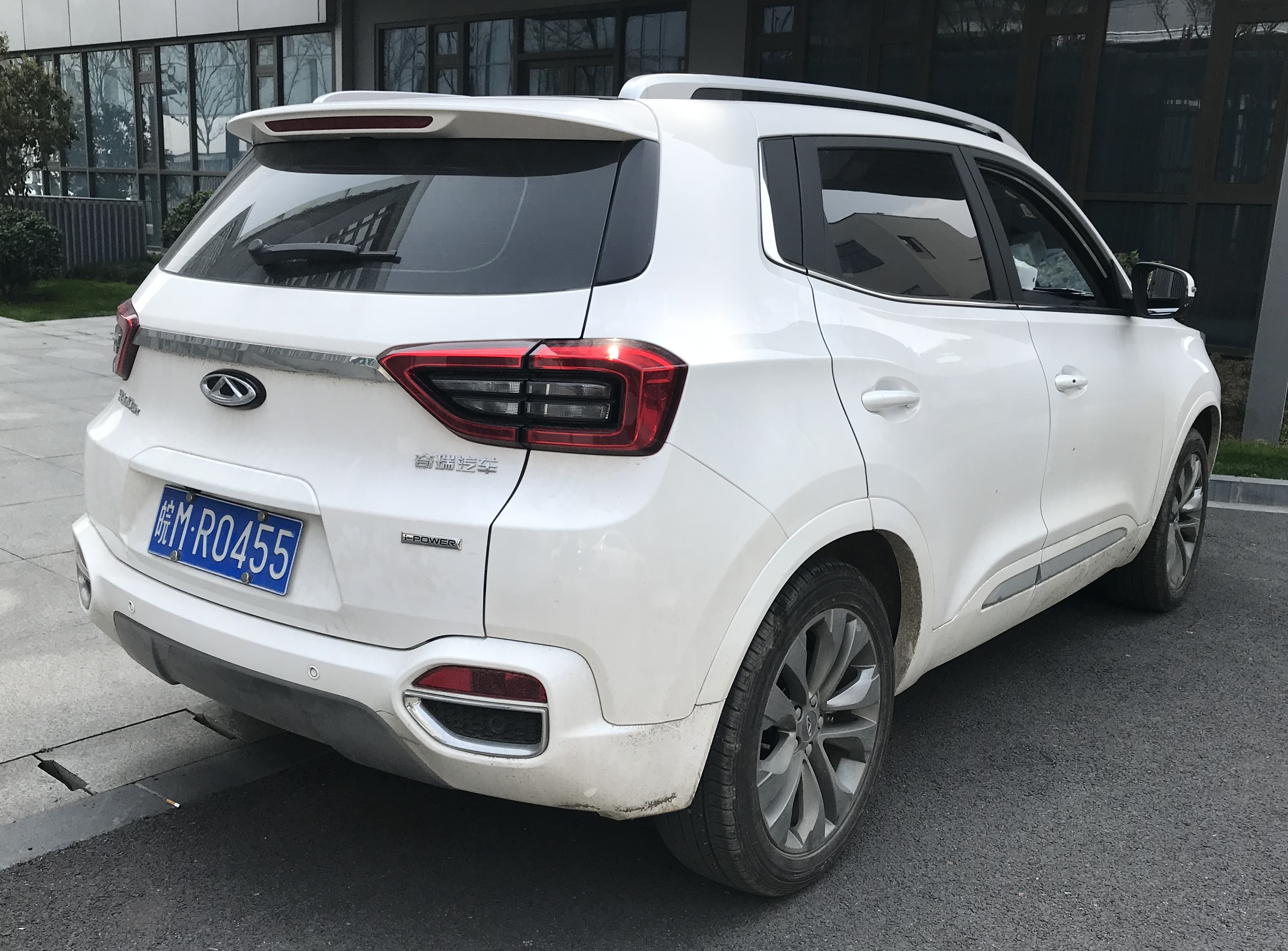
Rear view

== Facelift ==
=== 2019 ===
The Tiggo 5x received its first facelift in 2019, featuring revised front and rear fascia designs, with the front fascia sharing the same family design language that was introduced on the larger first-generation Tiggo 8.

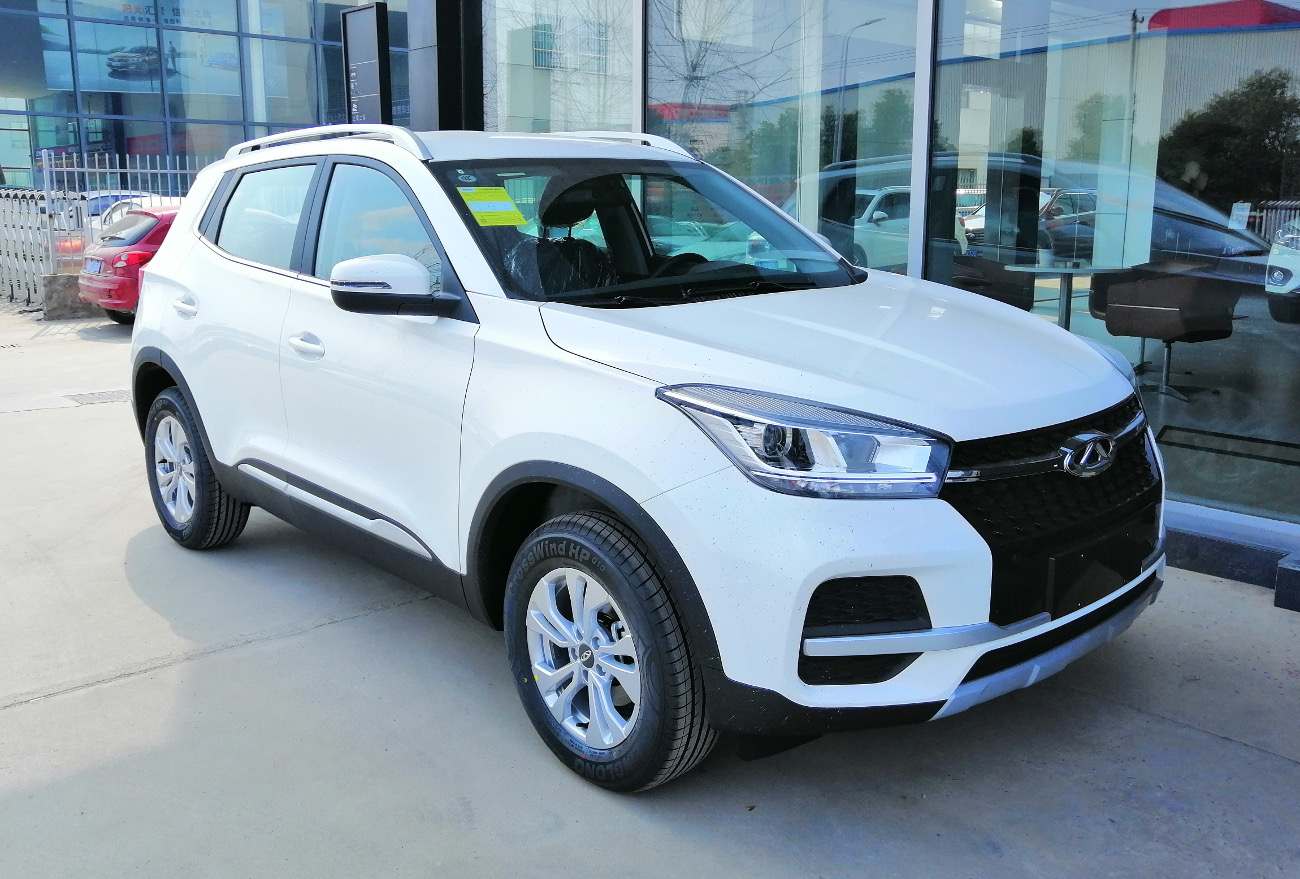
2019 Tiggo 5x

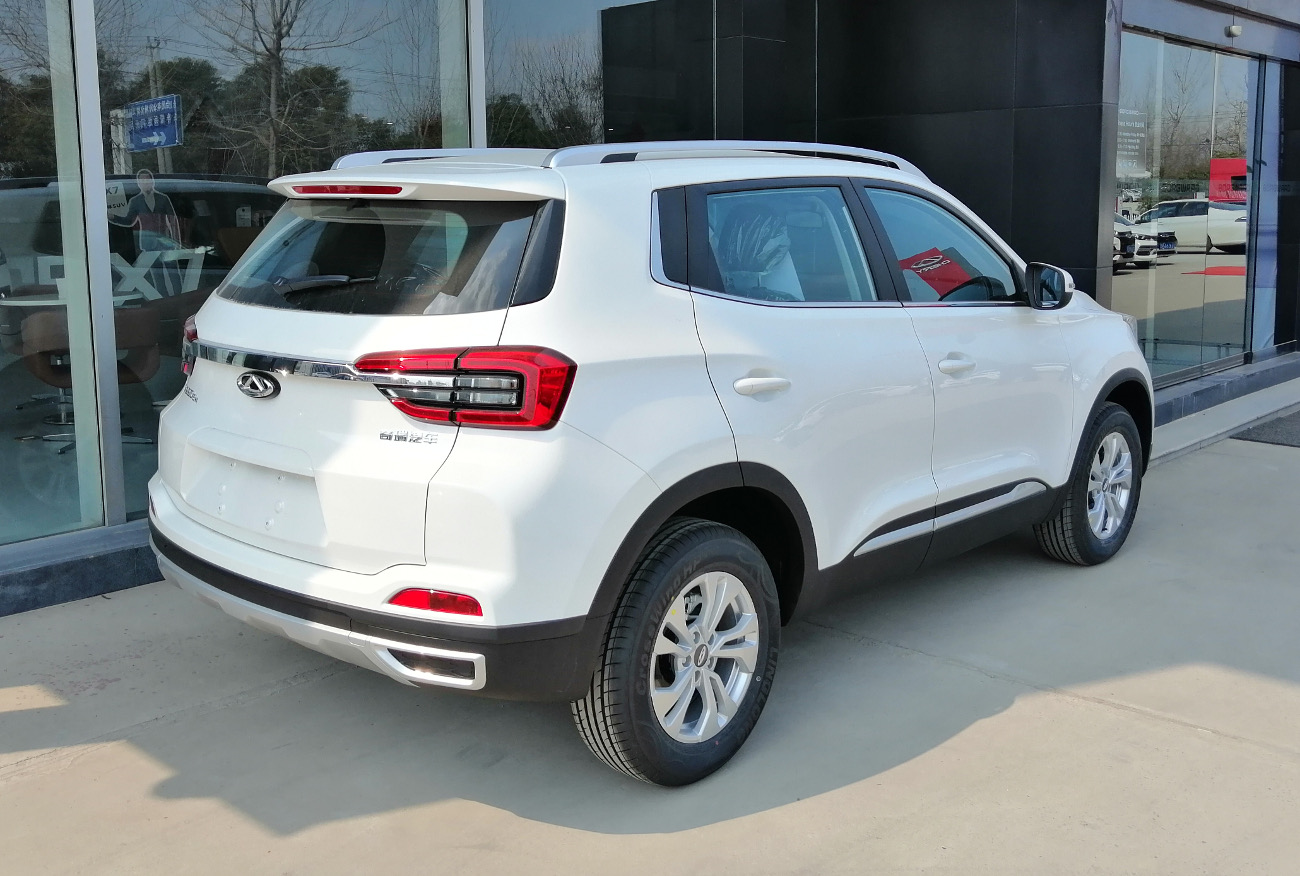
Rear view

=== 2020 ===
The second facelift was launched in 2020, featuring a further updated front fascia inline with the second-generation Tiggo 7. In some export markets, the 2020 facelifted model is often marketed with the Pro moniker.

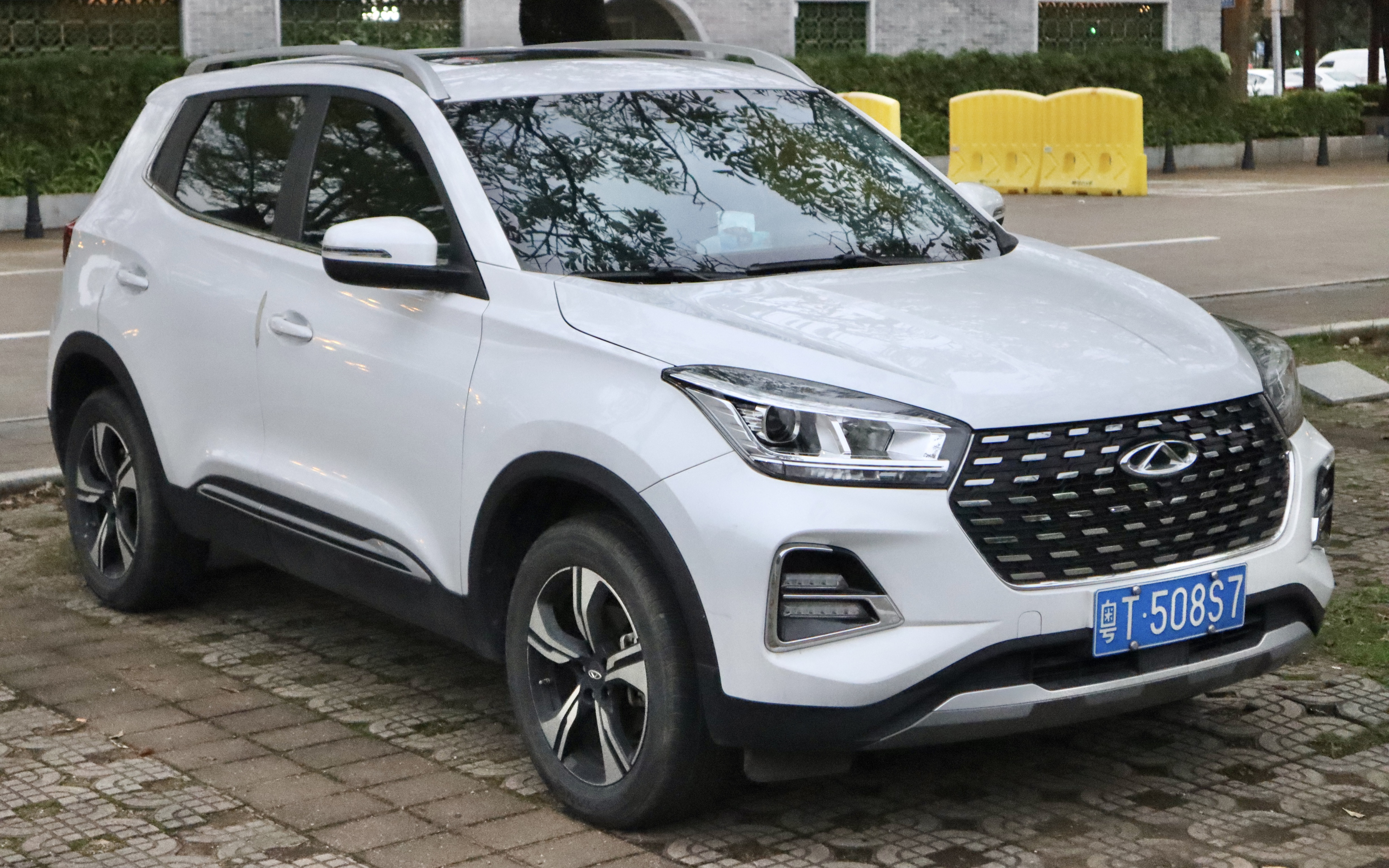
2020 Tiggo 5x

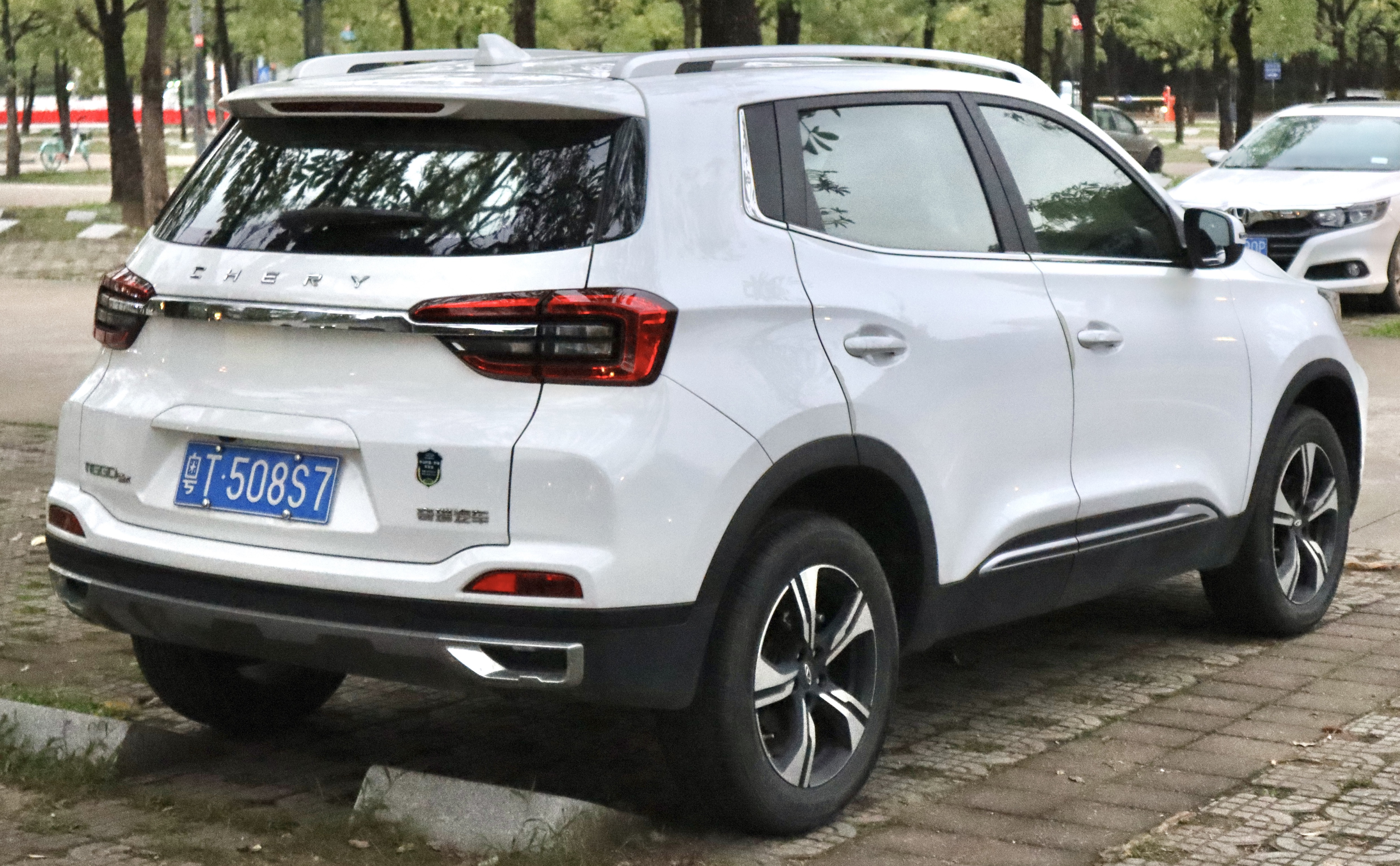
Rear view

=== 2024 ===
The third facelift, currently dedicated to the export-market Tiggo 4 models, was revealed in April 2024 during the 2024 Chery International Business Conference in Wuhu, Anhui. Changes include a redesigned front and rear fascia designs, along with new headlight units taken from the second-generation Tiggo 7 and a new C-pillar decoration. It also uses the updated interior dashboard design that was first introduced in the second-facelift-based Tiggo 4 Pro in Russia in March 2024. In South Africa and Indonesia, this model is sold as the Tiggo Cross, sold alongside the older Tiggo 4 Pro / Tiggo 5x.

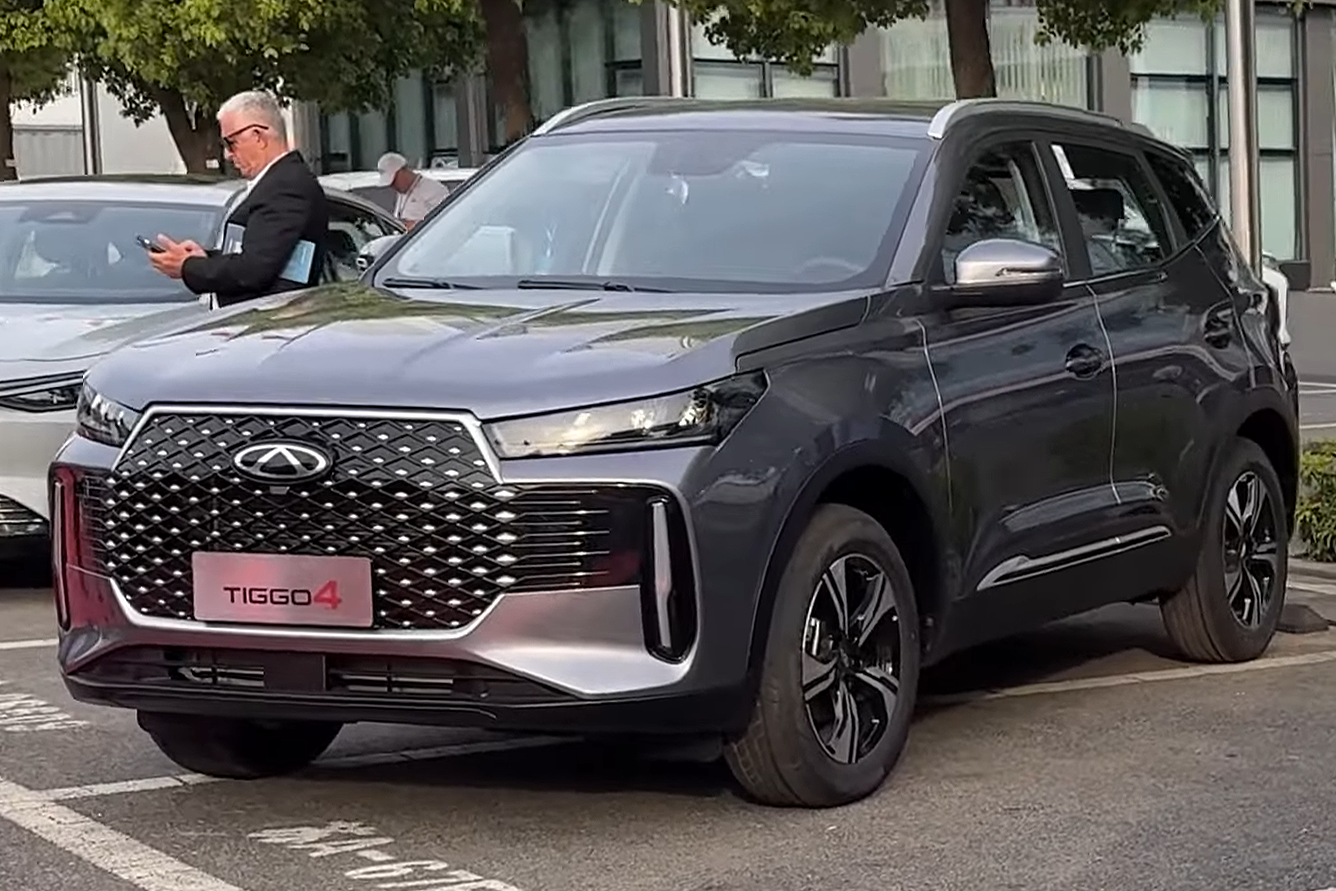
2024 Tiggo 4

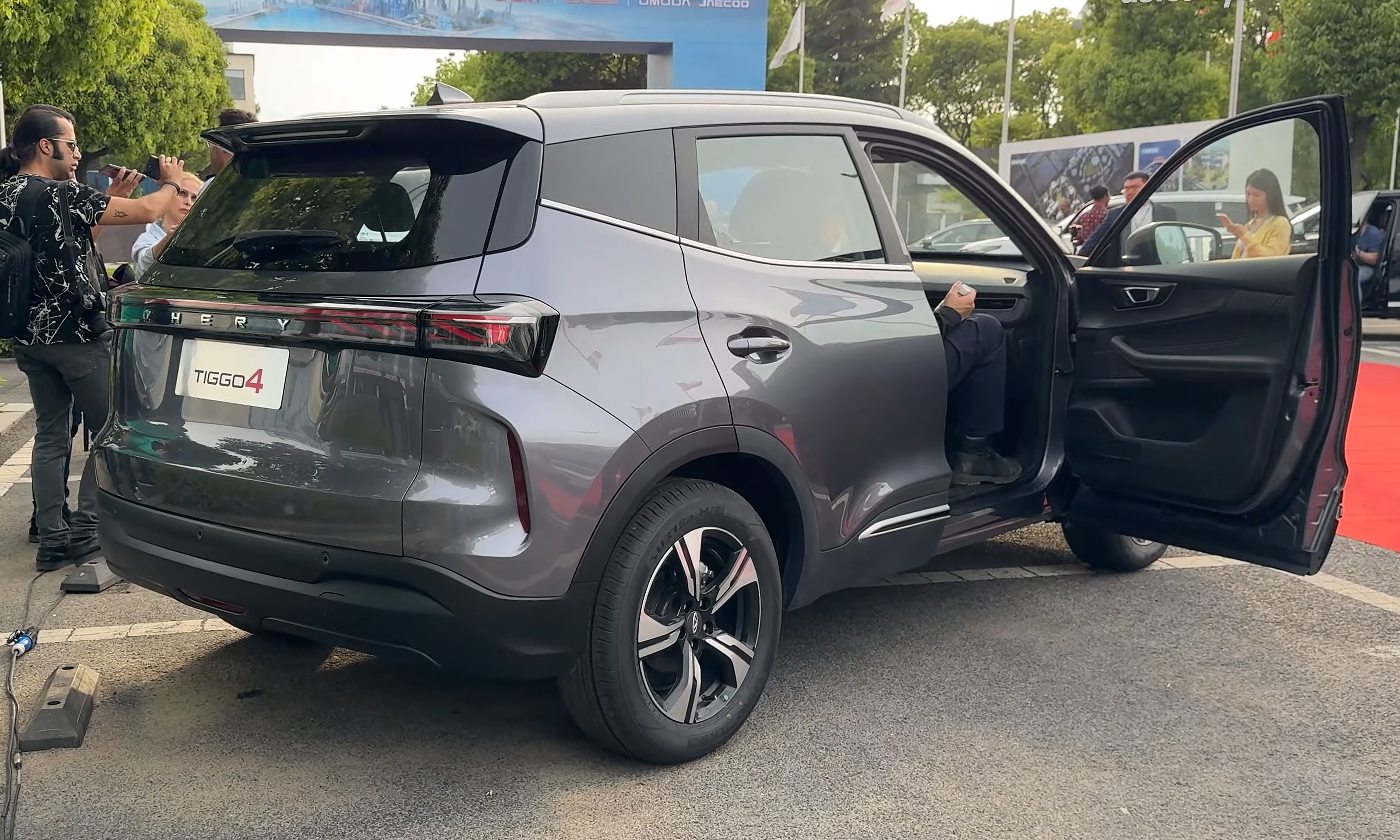
Rear view

== Tiggo e ==
An electric variant called the Tiggo e was also briefly offered in China. Introduced in 2019, it is equipped with a 53.6 kWh battery and delivering a range of 401 km (249 mi) (NEDC), with the Tiggo e drivetrain producing 95 kW (127 hp; 129 PS) of power, and 250 N⋅m (25.5 kg⋅m; 184 lb⋅ft) of torque. The top speed is 160 km/h (99 mph), with 0–50 km/h (0–31 mph) acceleration in 3.9 seconds.

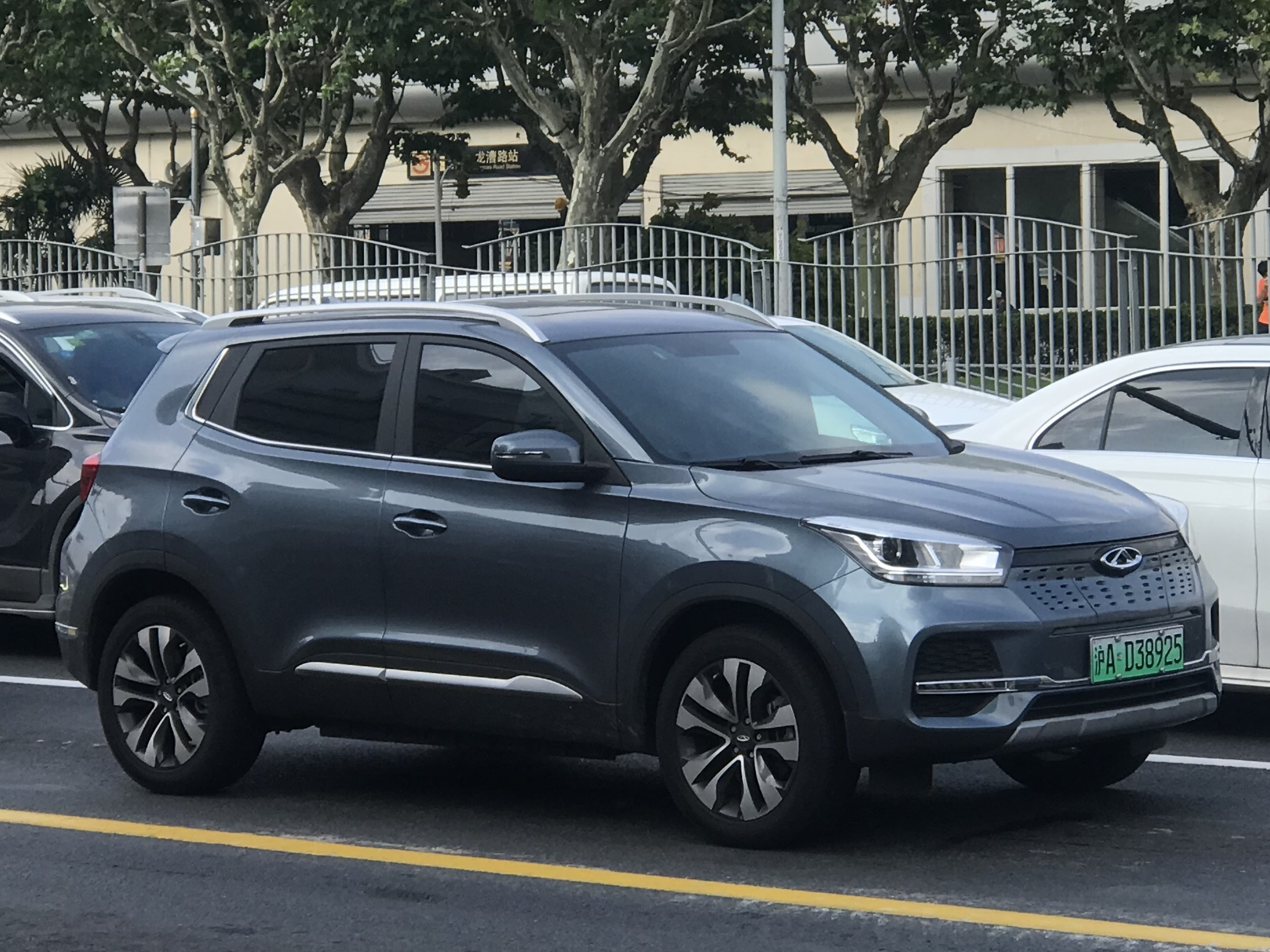
Tiggo e

== Markets ==
=== Australia ===
In Australia, the Tiggo 5x is sold as the Tiggo 4 Pro. It was revealed on 16 September 2024, with prices announced at the same time, while sales commenced in October 2024 for the 2025 model year. Available grades are the Urban and Ultimate. It is only available with a 1.5-litre turbocharged petrol engine, with CVT being standard across the range. Compared to other markets, the Tiggo 4 Pro for the Australian market features the front fascia and interior dashboard design from the export-market 2024 facelifted models, while retaining its entire rear fascia design from the previously facelifted 2019 Tiggo 4/5x and 2020 Tiggo 4 Pro/5x/5x Pro models.

An updated version, based on the export-market 2024 facelifted model includes its entire rear fascia design updated, marketed as the Tiggo 4 was introduced in April 2025 for the 2026 model year. It is offered with two grades, namely Urban and Ultimate, while retaining the same powertrain as the Tiggo 4 Pro. In August 2025, the hybrid version of the Tiggo 4 with the 1.5-litre petrol hybrid, marketed as the Tiggo 4 Hybrid, went on sale in Australia and the hybrid version available for the Urban and Ultimate variants. At the time of its introduction, the Tiggo 4 Hybrid was the cheapest hybrid electric vehicle (HEV) on sale in Australia.

=== Brunei ===
The Tiggo Cross was introduced alongside with the Tiggo 7 PHEV in Brunei on 11 September 2026, marking the return of Chery brand in the Bruneian market after 13 years of hiatus. The Tiggo Cross is available in sole Turbo variant, it is powered by a 1.5-litre turbocharged petrol engine mated with 6-speed dual-clutch automatic based on the export-market 2024 facelifted model.

=== Europe ===
In Europe, the Tiggo 5x is sold as the Tiggo 4 and was released for the European market in March 2026, starting in the United Kingdom. For Europe, it is available with the 1.5-litre petrol hybrid branded with the Super Hybrid name. At the time of its introduction, the Tiggo 4 Hybrid was one of the cheapest hybrid electric vehicles (HEV) in Europe.

=== Indonesia ===
The Tiggo 5x was first introduced in Indonesia on 28 January 2022 as the Tiggo 4 Pro. After being delayed through two years, the model was instead re-introduced with its original Tiggo 5x nameplate in February 2024 at the 31st Indonesia International Motor Show. Sales were commenced on 13 June 2024. Variants include the Classic and Champion. It is only available with a 1.5-litre naturally-aspirated petrol engine paired to a CVT. It is locally assembled at Handal Indonesia Motor's facility in Bekasi, West Java.

An updated version, based on the export-market 2024 facelifted model, named the Tiggo Cross was introduced in February 2025 at the 32nd Indonesia International Motor Show. It is offered with two variants, namely Comfort and Premium, while retaining the same powertrain as the Tiggo 5x. On 23 July 2024 at the 32nd Gaikindo Indonesia International Auto Show, two new versions released for the Tiggo Cross, namely Sport Turbo and CSH (Chery Super Hybrid). The Sport Turbo variant is powered by a 1.5-litre turbocharged petrol engine paired to a 6-speed DCT, while the CSH variant is powered by a 1.5-litre Atkinson Cycle petrol hybrid engine and a 1.83 kWh battery paired to a DHT (Dedicated Hybrid Transmission). Later on 1 August 2025 at the 32nd Gaikindo Indonesia International Auto Show, the CSH Comfort variant was introduced and the sole unnamed CSH model became the CSH Premium variant.

=== Malaysia ===
The Tiggo Cross was introduced in Malaysia on 8 May 2025 at the Malaysia Auto Show 2025, and previewed in June 2025 before its official launch on 9 July 2025. In Malaysia, it is available with two variants: Turbo and Hybrid CSH. For powertrains, the Turbo variant is powered by the 1.5-litre turbocharged petrol paired with the 6-speed DCT, while the Hybrid CSH variant is powered by the 1.5-litre petrol hybrid paired with the DHT150. In October 2026, the Sport Edition (SE) model based on the Turbo variant was introduced to the line-up.

=== Mexico ===
In Mexico, the Tiggo 5x is marketed as the Tiggo 4 Pro under the Chirey brand, which was launched in October 2022. Trim levels include the Comfort and Premium. It is only available with a 1.5-litre turbocharged petrol engine, with CVT being standard across the range.

=== Middle East ===
The Tiggo 5x is sold as the Tiggo 4 Pro in select Middle Eastern markets such as Kuwait, Bahrain, Qatar, Saudi Arabia and the UAE since 2021. Depending on the region, it is available in four trim levels: base, Comfort, Luxury and Flagship. Powertrain choices include a 1.5-litre naturally-aspirated petrol with CVT (base, Comfort and Luxury) and a 1.5-litre turbocharged petrol engine with 6-speed DCT (Flagship).

=== Pakistan ===
The Tiggo 5x was launched in Pakistan in March 2022 as the Tiggo 4 Pro, alongside the Tiggo 8 Pro. It is locally assembled under license at Ghandhara Nissan's plant in Karachi, with production commenced on 31 March 2022.

=== Philippines ===
In the Philippines, the Tiggo 5x is sold with its original nameplate. It was launched in November 2019, alongside the Tiggo 2, Tiggo 7 and Tiggo 8, marking Chery's return to the Philippine market. Initial variants of the Philippine market Tiggo 5x were the base and Luxury. Initial engine option is a 1.5-litre naturally-aspirated petrol, with transmission options include a 5-speed manual (base) and CVT (all variants).

The facelifted model, marketed as the Tiggo 5x Pro, was revealed in April 2022 at the 17th Manila International Auto Show. A hybrid variant with a 1.5-litre turbocharged 48V mild-hybrid petrol was introduced in April 2023 at the 18th Manila International Auto Show. The entire Philippine market Tiggo 5x Pro range went on sale in July 2023.

A version based on the export-market 2024 facelifted model, named the Tiggo Cross, was launched in April 2025 at the 20th Manila International Auto Show. At launch, the Tiggo Cross was available in the sole variant powered by the 1.5-litre naturally-aspirated petrol paired with a CVT. In August 2025, the Tiggo Cross HEV model, powered by the 1.5-litre petrol hybrid, was launched in the Philippines in the sole variant.

=== Russia ===
The Tiggo 5x was launched in Russia in February 2019 as the Tiggo 4. Initial variants were the Comfort and Luxury with one engine option being available; a 1.5-litre naturally-aspirated petrol.

Six months after its initial launch, the Russian market Tiggo 4 received a facelift in August 2019. For the facelift, the 1.5-litre naturally-aspirated petrol was replaced by a 2.0-litre unit, with transmission options include a 5-speed manual and CVT. The facelifted model was initially available with three variants: Start, Comfort and Techno. In October 2019, the Cosmo variant was added to the lineup. The Cosmo uses a 1.5-litre turbocharged petrol engine with 6-speed DCT.

In August 2020, the Tiggo 4 received minor changes; the 1.5-litre naturally-aspirated petrol engine option was re-introduced and included only on the Comfort variant, replacing the 2.0-litre in the previous Comfort models, while two new variants were added to the range; base and Luxury.

To commemorate Chery's 15-year existence in the Russian market, the Limited Edition model of the Tiggo 4 was made available respectively on the Techno and Cosmo variants in December 2020, with only 515 units were sold. At the same time, the Start variant was dropped from the lineup. In July 2021, another two variants were added to the range; 1.5 Travel and 1.5T Trek.

The Pro version was launched on 23 September 2022. The Pro version is initially available with four variants: Action, Family, Travel and Style. Engine and transmission options were carried over from the regular version, including a 1.5-litre naturally-aspirated petrol (Action and Family) and a 1.5-litre turbocharged petrol (Travel and Style), with CVT is standard across the range while the 5-speed manual is optional on the Action variant. The 1.5T Ultimate was added in January 2023.

On 1 March 2024, the Pro version received an updated interior dashboard design, as well a special edition model, the 18 Years Edition, to commemorate Chery's 18-year existence in the Russian market.

The regular Tiggo 4 went on a hiatus from the Russian market between July 2023 and October 2024. The regular version was re-introduced to the Russian market on 31 October 2024, using the styling from the export-market 2024 facelifted models, making it as its second facelift. For the second facelift, the Tiggo 4 is available with three variants, namely Active, Prime and Ultra, while it is only available with one powertrain option; a 1.5-litre turbocharged petrol engine with 6-speed DCT.

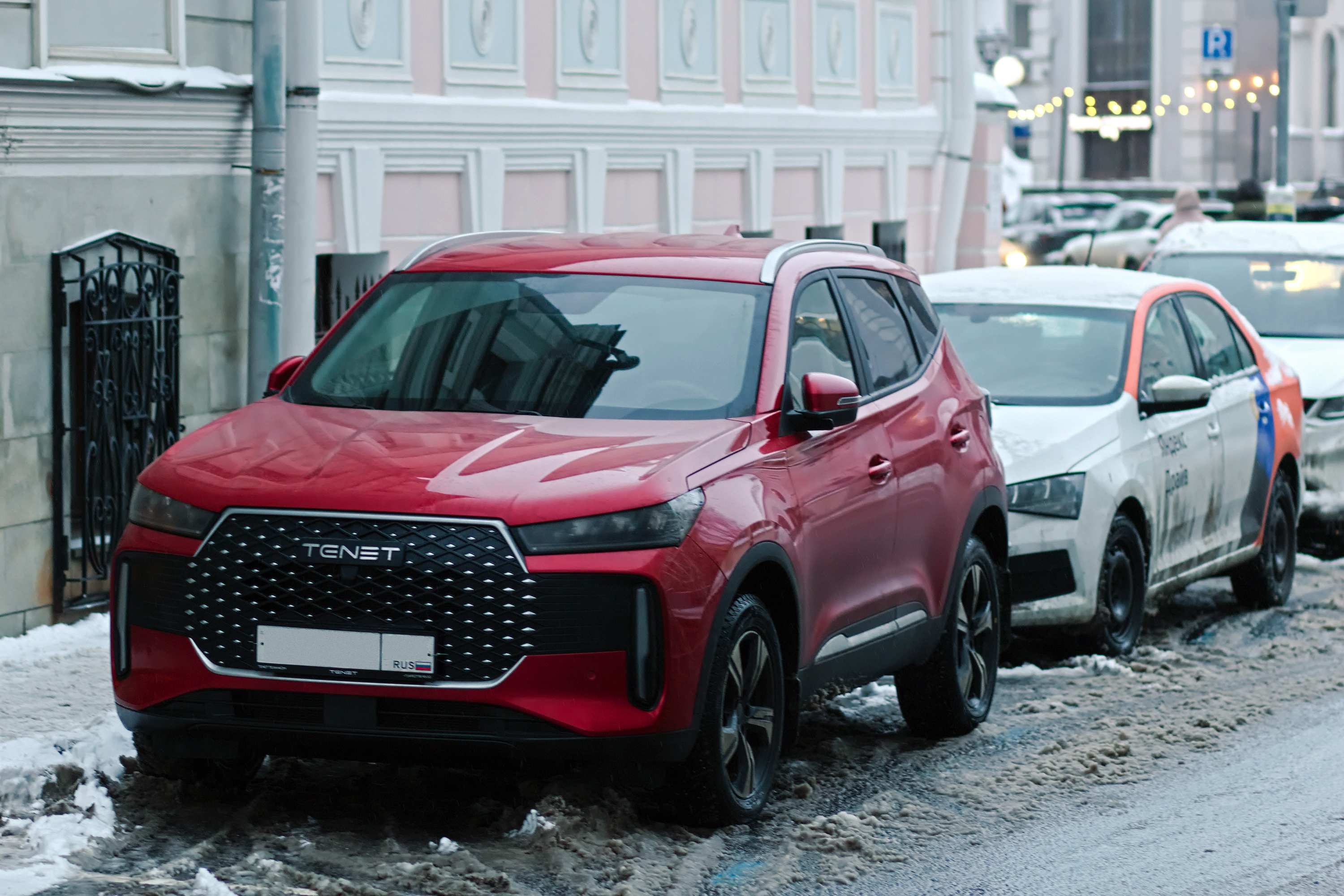
Tenet T4

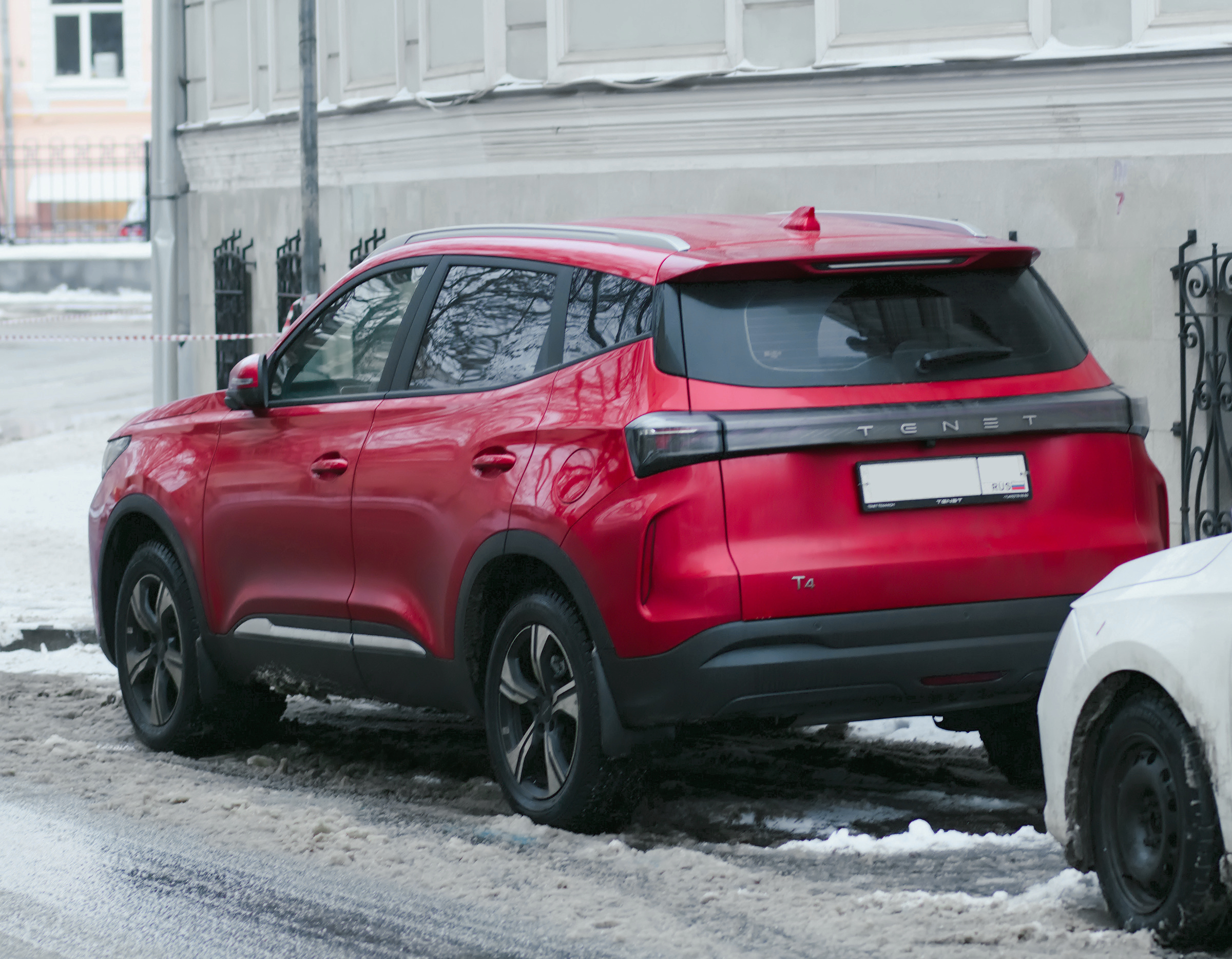
Tenet T4 rear

=== South Africa ===
The Tiggo 5x was launched in South Africa on 24 November 2021 as the Tiggo 4 Pro, as Chery's first model in the country after a three-year absence. Initial variants include the Urban, Comfort, Elite and Elite SE, while engine options include a 1.5-litre naturally-aspirated petrol (Urban and Comfort) and a 1.5-litre turbocharged petrol (Elite and Elite SE), while transmission options include a 5-speed manual (Urban), 6-speed manual (Elite) and CVT (Comfort, Elite and Elite SE).

The base LiT variant was added in September 2023. The LiT uses the same 1.5-litre naturally-aspirated engine as the Urban and Comfort variants, while sharing the 5-speed manual option as the Urban, and the CVT option as the Comfort, Elite and Elite SE.

In May 2024, the interior of the Elite and Elite SE received a redesigned centre console, while a 6-speed DCT was made available as an option for the LiT and Elite.

A panel van version, based on the LiT, was revealed in August 2024 at the 2024 Kyalami Festival of Motoring. It is fully homologated as a light commercial vehicle for the deletion of its rear seats. Sales were commenced in September 2024.

A version based on the export-market 2024 facelifted model, named the Tiggo Cross, was also revealed at the same event as the Tiggo 4 Pro Panel Van. Prices were announced on 4 November 2024. Available with Comfort and Elite variants, the Tiggo Cross replaces the Comfort and Elite SE variants of the Tiggo 4 Pro, with its initial powertrain option being a 1.5-litre turbocharged petrol engine with 6-speed DCT. In June 2025, the hybrid version of the Tiggo Cross with the 1.5-litre petrol hybrid, marketed as the Chery Super Hybrid (CSH), was launched in South Africa and the CSH version available for the Comfort and Elite variants. At the time of its introduction, the Tiggo Cross Chery Super Hybrid (CSH) was the cheapest hybrid electric vehicle (HEV) on sale in South Africa. In October 2025, the Million Edition model using the 1.5-litre turbocharged petrol engine, was added to the lineup to celebrate the one-millionth export of the Tiggo 4 from China. In March 2026, the entry-level LiT variants using the 1.5-litre petrol engine paired with either a 5-speed manual or CVT, were added to the line-up.

=== South America ===
The Tiggo 5x is sold through select South American markets (except Brazil) as the Tiggo 4. It was launched in Chile in April 2018, Ecuador in August 2018, Colombia in October 2018, and Argentina in December 2020.

For the Brazilian market, the Tiggo 5x was first introduced in November 2018 at the 30th São Paulo International Motor Show, retaining its original name, and launched on 11 December 2018. Trim levels include the T and TXS, with its initial powertrain option is a 1.5-litre turbocharged flex-fuel engine with 6-speed DCT. Brazilian models are locally assembled at Caoa Chery's plant in Anápolis, Goiás. It received a facelift on 21 February 2020. The T trim was dropped from the lineup in April 2021.

The second facelift, renamed to Tiggo 5x Pro, was revealed for the Brazilian market on 17 February 2022, and went on sale in the following end of that same month. For the second facelift, the 6-speed DCT was replaced by the CVT transmission. The hybrid variant with a 1.5-litre turbocharged 48V mild-hybrid flex-fuel engine, was introduced in July 2022, alongside the mild-hybrid version of the Tiggo 7 Pro. In June 2023, an entry-level model called the Tiggo 5x Sport was added, while the hybrid version received a new variant called Max Drive.

The second facelifted Tiggo 5x was also launched as the Tiggo 4 Pro in other South American markets such as Argentina in August 2022, Ecuador in September 2023, and Colombia in November 2023. The second facelift was also launched in Chile in August 2022 as the Tiggo 3 Pro.

== Rebranded versions ==
=== DR 4.0/5.0 ===
DR Automobiles marketed the Tiggo 5x in Italy as the DR 5.0, which was launched in March 2020. Adopting the styling used by the facelifted 2019 Tiggo 5x/4 models, the 5.0 was initially offered with one engine option; a 1.5-litre naturally-aspirated engine. A 1.5-litre turbocharged engine option with a 6-speed manual was made available since November 2020. Alongside the conventional petrol supply, the 5.0 is also available with DR's Thermohybrid bi-fuel (petrol/LPG) setup.

The facelifted model was revealed in June 2021 at the 2021 Milano Monza Open-Air Motor Show, with sales commenced in January 2022. For the facelifted model, the 5.0 adopts the styling used by the facelifted 2020 Tiggo 4 Pro/5x/5x Pro models.

Following the introduction of the facelifted 5.0, the pre-facelift 5.0 was renamed to the DR 4.0 in early 2022, and was sold alongside the facelifted 5.0 until 2024.

Also, it is sold in Spain since 2022.

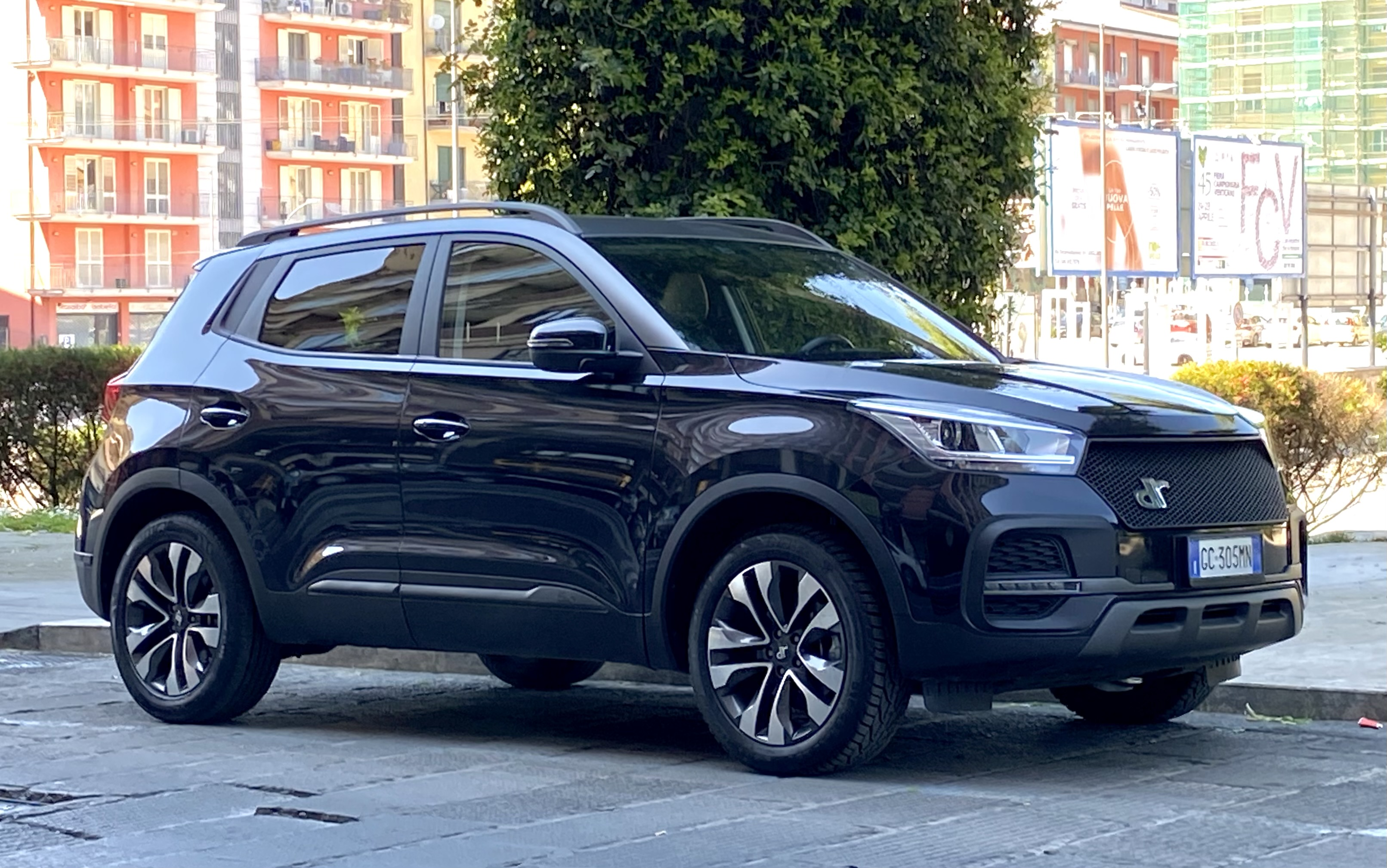
Pre-facelift DR 5.0

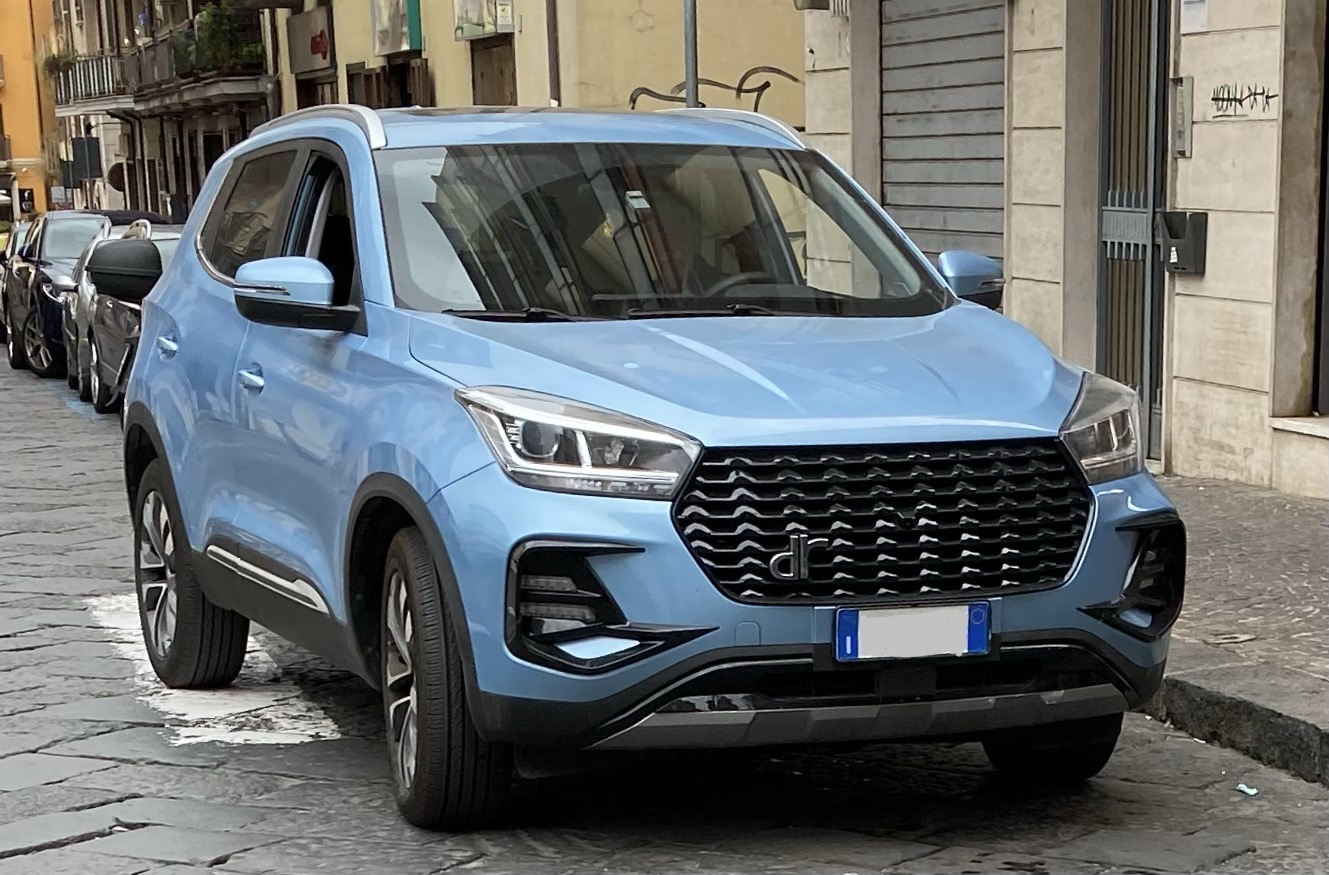
Post-facelift DR 5.0

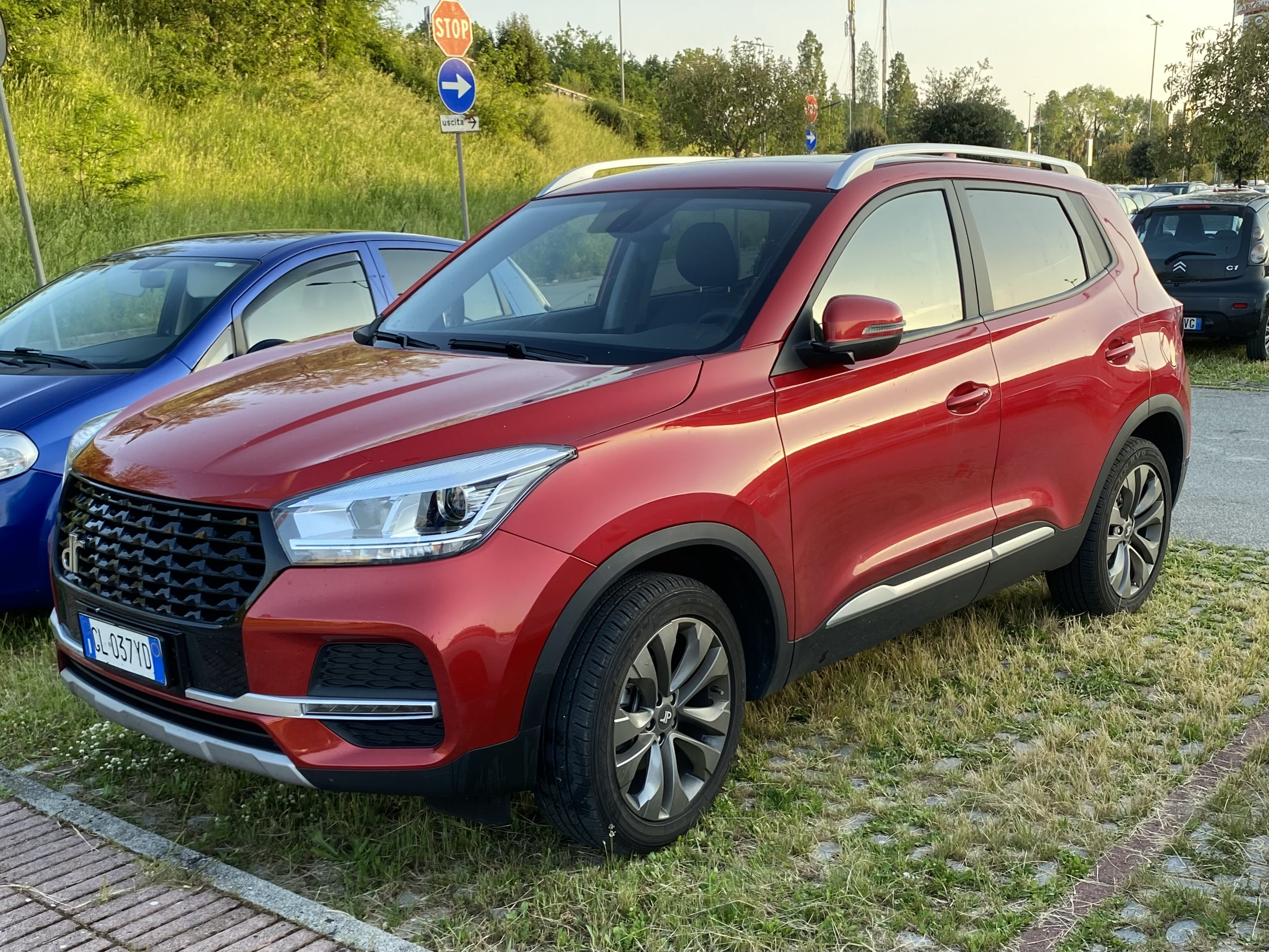
DR 4.0

=== MVM X55/X55 Pro ===
Modiran Vehicle Manufacturing Company (MVM) marketed the Tiggo 5x in Iran as the MVM X55, which was introduced in 2019. Adopting the styling used by the facelifted 2019 Tiggo 5x/4 models, the X55 is available with two trim levels, Excellent and Excellent Sport. The 1.5-litre turbocharged petrol engine with 6-speed DCT is standard across the regular X55 range.

The facelifted model, adopting the styling from the facelifted 2020 Tiggo 4 Pro/5x/5x Pro models, was made available since 2022 as the MVM X55 Pro, instead of the older X55. The X55 Pro shares the same powertrain as the regular X55, albeit with a CVT transmission.

Both X55 and X55 Pro are locally assembled at MVM's facility in Bam, Kerman Province.

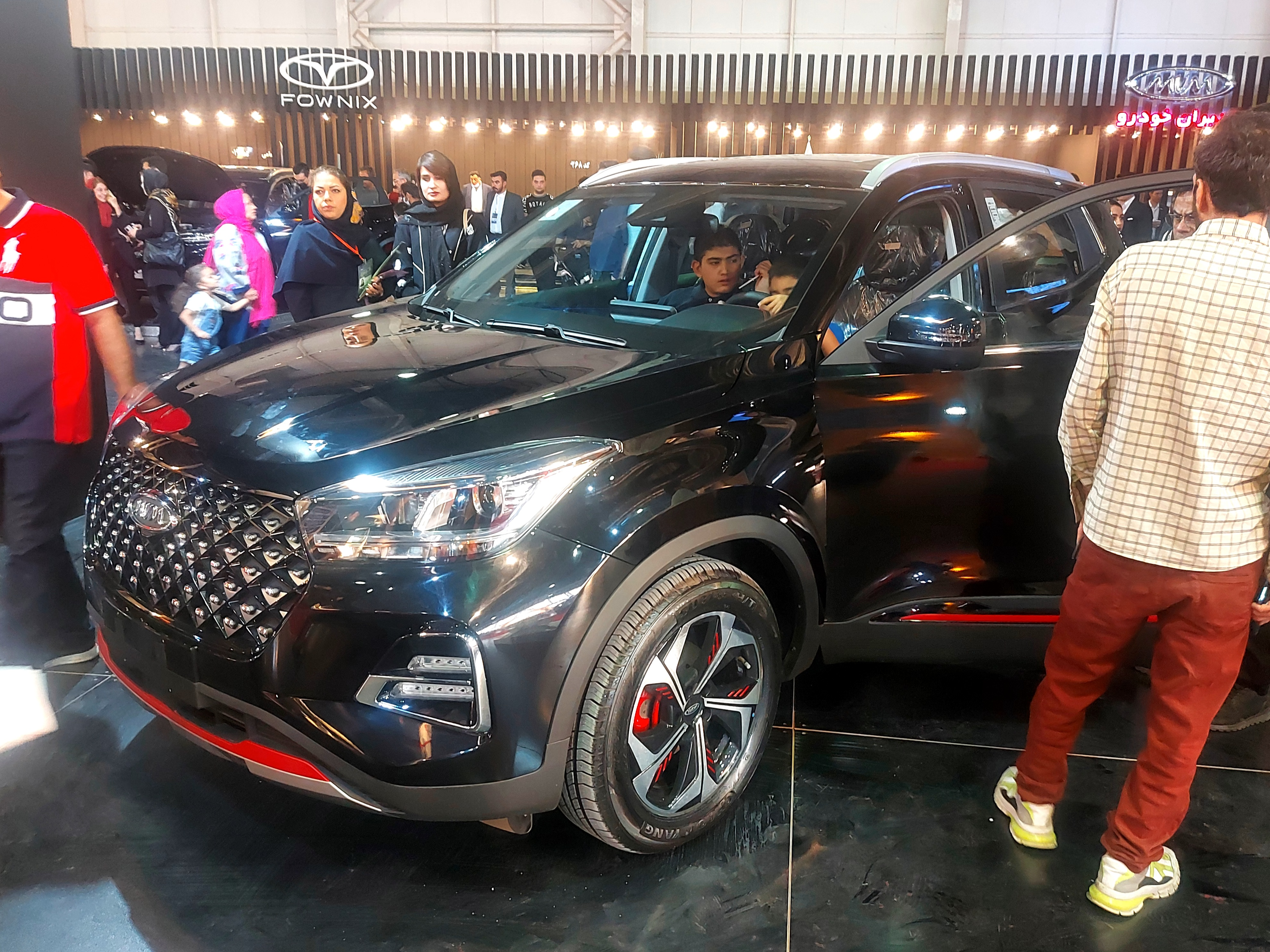
MVM X55 Pro

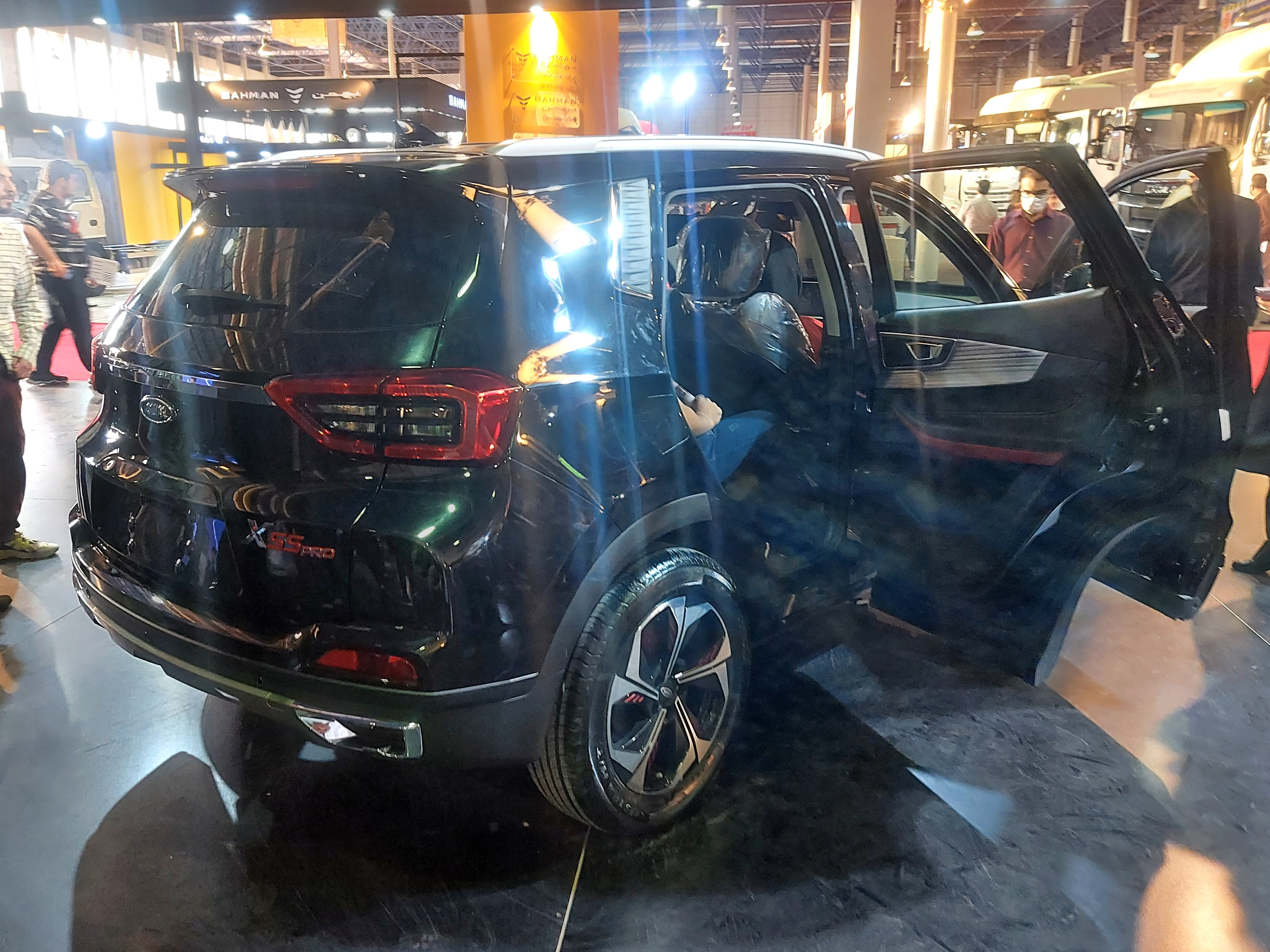
Rear view (X55 Pro)

=== Sportequipe 5 ===
Sportequipe, a subsidiary of DR Automobiles, sold a version of the Tiggo 5x as the Sportequipe 5 since 2023, which was first revealed in June 2022 at the 2022 Milano Monza Open-Air Motor Show. The model sported the front fascia design from the non-Pro/Plus versions of the Tiggo 8. It shares the 1.5-litre turbocharged engine, as well supply options, as the turbocharged variants of the DR 5.0.

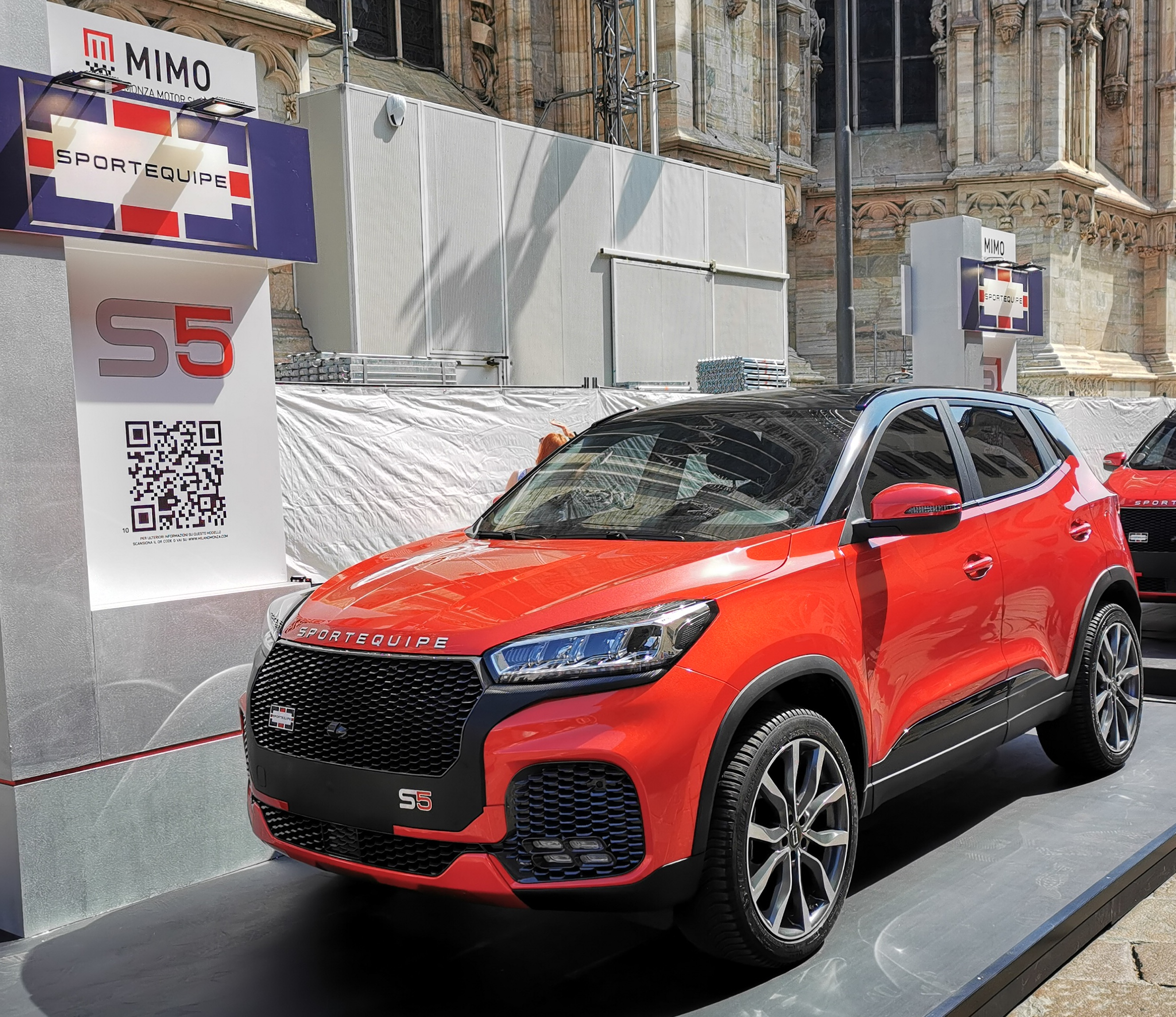
Sportequipe 5

=== Ebro S400 ===
Ebro unveiled their third model S400 at the 2025 Automobile Barcelona, after launching s700 and s800 in the final quarter of 2024. It's based in 2024 facelift Tiggo 4 and with a hybrid system with 211 hp. This product will be arrive alongside 2025 and will be assembled in Ebro's factory in Barcelona.

== Other versions ==
=== Tiggo 5x High Energy (2025) ===
Starting from 2025, the Chinese market Omoda C5 was renamed to the Tiggo 5x High Energy, featuring a revised front grille design.

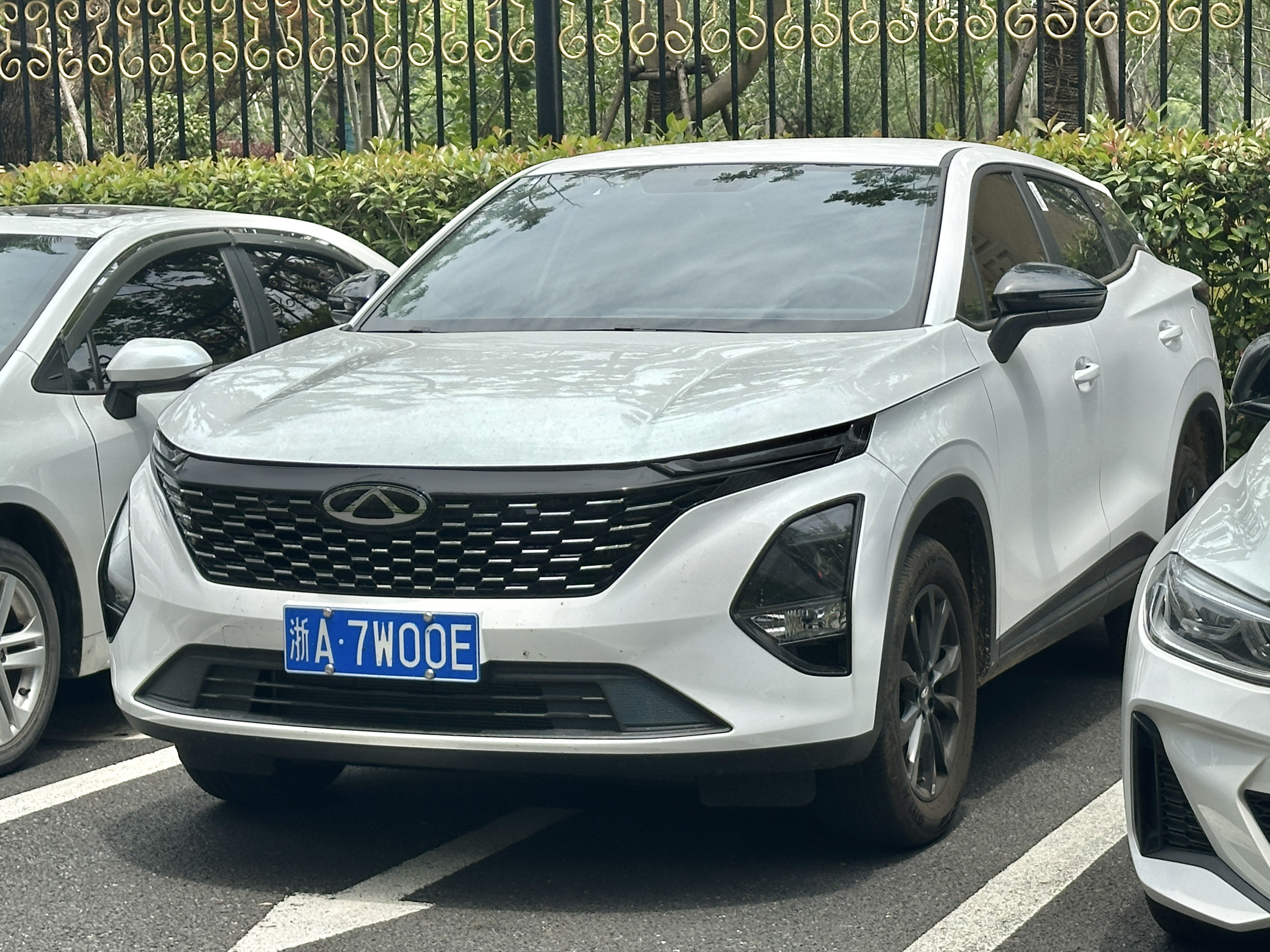
Tiggo 5x High Energy

== Safety ==
=== ANCAP ===
ANCAP test results Chery Tiggo 4 Pro (2023, aligned with Euro NCAP)
Test	Points	%
Overall:	5 /5 stars	
Adult occupant:	35.52	88%
Child occupant:	42.74	87%
Pedestrian:	50.37	79%
Safety assist:	15.31	85%

=== Euro NCAP ===
Euro NCAP test results EBRO s400 HEV (LHD) (2025)
Test	Points	%
Overall:	4 /5 stars	
Adult occupant:	32.0	79%
Child occupant:	41.8	85%
Pedestrian:	49.4	78%
Safety assist:	14.5	80%

== Sales ==
Year	China	Russia	Brazil	South Africa	Mexico	Australia	Indonesia		
Year	China	Russia	Brazil	South Africa	Mexico	Australia	Tiggo 5X	Tiggo Cross	Tiggo Cross CSH
2018	9,877				—				
2019	60,245	1,968	7,973		—				
2020	30,592	5,715	8,764		—				
2021	83,611	14,034	12,517		—				
2022	114,927	9,548	9,654	4,622	1,179				
2023	27,457	36,908	14,396	10,054	9,214				
2024	16,819		20,153	12,646	5,299		879		
2025	25,772		15,671			20,149	137	2,949	2,041
