= MIAS =

MIAS may refer to:

- Maryknoll Institute of African Studies, educational institute, see Maryknoll
- MIAs, plural of Missing in Action
- Moscow International Automobile Salon, auto show in Russia
- Montreal International Auto Show, auto show in Canada
- Manila International Auto Show, auto show in the Philippines
- Monash International Affairs Society, a research group of the Monash University
