= Indonesia International Motor Show =

Indonesian automotive exhibition

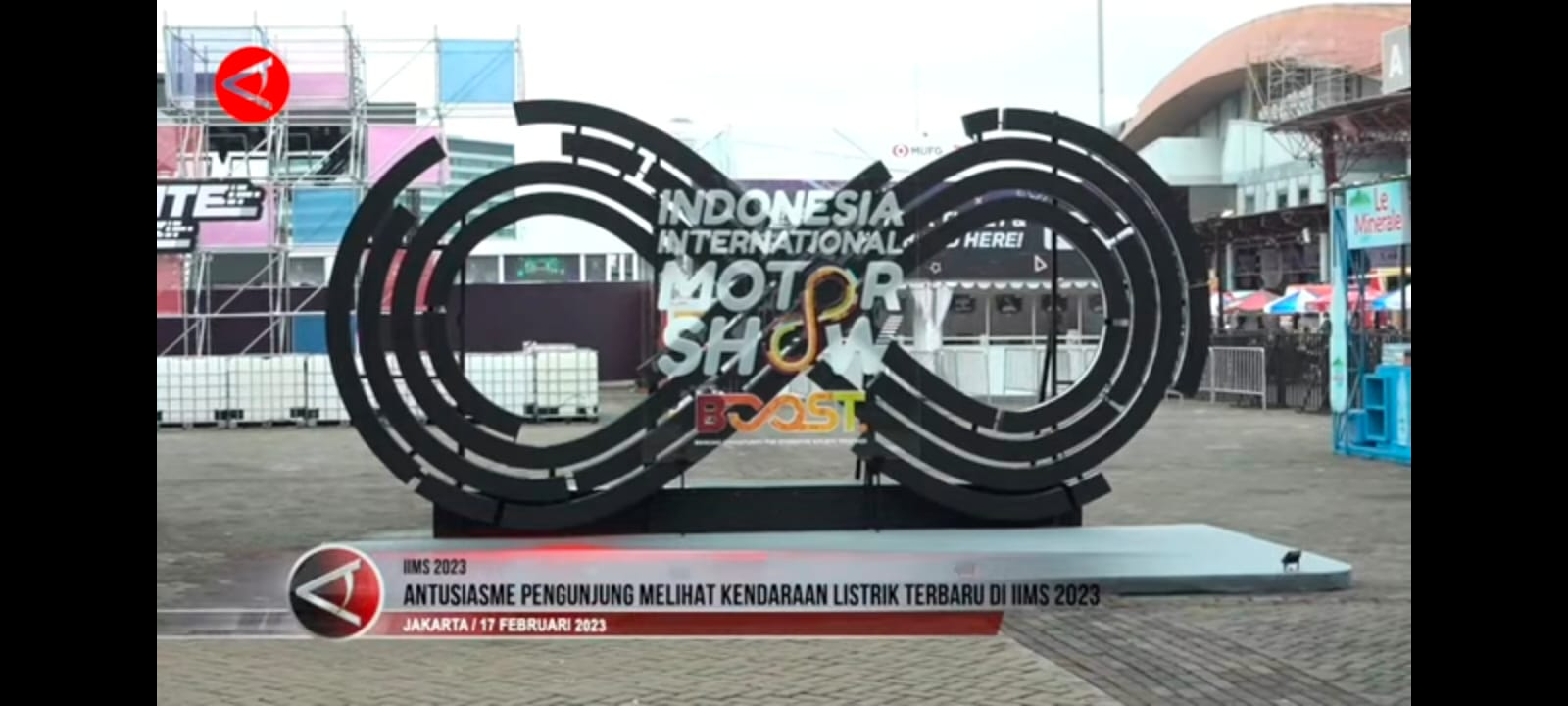
- Entrance gate during 2023 edition
- Nickname: IIMS
- Status: Active
- Genre: Auto show
- Frequency: Annual
- Venue: Jakarta International Expo (JIExpo); Jakarta Convection Center (JCC, until 2008)
- Country: Indonesia
- Years active: 1986–present
- Previous event: 5–15 February 2026
- Next event: 29 April – 9 May 2027
- Organiser: Dyandra Promosindo (Kompas Gramedia)
- Website: indonesianmotorshow.com

The Indonesia International Motor Show (formerly Gaikindo Auto Expo) is an annual automotive exhibition in Jakarta, Indonesia. It is organized by Dyandra Promosindo, a subsidiary of Kompas Gramedia. Since 2009, the exhibition is held at Jakarta International Expo Kemayoran in Pademangan, North Jakarta.

From 1986 to 2011, the exhibition started in July. From 2012 to 2015, the exhibition started in August or September. From 2016 to 2022, the exhibition started in April to May. Since 2023, the exhibition has started in February.

== History ==
It started in 1986 by the name of Gaikindo Car Exhibition. The 4,000 m^{2} (43,000 sq ft) of Jakarta Convention Center (JCC) was the initial venue.

After changing the name into Jakarta Auto Expo in 1989, the exhibition grew significantly. The number of participants increased, even though it was postponed twice in 1992–1993 and 1997–1999 due to the government tight money policy and Asian Financial Crisis.

By the year of 2000, PT Dyandra Promosindo had been involved as the exhibition organizer handling the event which name had been changed into Gaikindo Auto Expo. As a result, the auto expo was receiving a big success by attended by 115 automotive-related companies.

As the time went by, Gaikindo Auto Expo was getting bigger and bigger. The number of participants increased, and the number of visitors had also jumped (161,089 visitors in 2005).

In 2006, Gaikindo Auto Expo started a new level of auto exhibition which was eventually becoming an international-scale exhibition by collaborating with OIC (Organisation Internationale des Constructeurs d’Automobiles) that coordinates international motor shows throughout the world. As a result, Gaikindo Auto Expo was changed into the 14th Indonesia International Motor Show, held from 21 to 30 July 2006. At the time, there were 165.984 visitors who contributed to a Rp 1.005 trillion transactions.

As the number of both visitors and participants was increasing, the 17th Indonesia International Motor Show was held from 24 July to 2 August 2009 at Jakarta International Expo Kemayoran with 80,000 m^{2} (860,000 sq ft) of space.

IIMS continued to grow in size from 2010 to 2013. Its annual themes focused on automotive technology and environmental issues. The 2010 theme was "Eco-Technology Motoring". The 2011 theme was "Sustainable Green Technology", followed by "Eco-Mobility" in 2012 and "Smart Vehicle Mobility" in 2013.

A breakthrough had been made by IIMS as at the 21st Indonesia International Motor Show held from 19 to 29 September 2013, the event covering a total gross area of 75,101 m^{2} (808,380 sq ft) which this led IIMS to be bigger than the other automotive exhibition in Asia-Pacific.

== 2013 ==
The 21st Indonesia International Motor Show was held from 19 to 29 September 2013.

=== Production car introduction ===
- Honda Mobilio
- Daihatsu Ayla (auto show debut)
- Hyundai Veloster Turbo
- Kia Optima
- Toyota Agya (auto show debut)
- Toyota Kijang Innova (second facelift)

=== Concept cars ===
- Daihatsu UFC-2
- Daihatsu CUV
- Daihatsy NC-Z
- Honda NSX concept
- Toyota Fun-vii
- Toyota TS030

== 2014 ==
The 22nd Indonesia International Motor Show was held from 18 to 28 August 2014, at JiEXPO Kemayoran. The 22nd IIMS is the last exhibition under the Gaikindo before split into the two, the Gaikindo Indonesia International Auto Show (GIIAS).

=== Production car introduction ===
- Daihatsu Copen
- Mitsubishi Delica
- Subaru WRX
- Toyota RAV4

== 2015 ==
The 23rd Indonesia International Motor Show was held from 20 to 30 August 2015, with the opening ceremonies were held in 19 August 2015, a day before the first day. It was the first time the exhibition has been split into two, the other being the Gaikindo Indonesia International Auto Show (GIIAS), which is organized by Seven Events and was held at the same time at the newer venue, Indonesia Convention Exhibition, located at BSD City in Tangerang Regency, Banten. Unlike GIIAS, IIMS was no longer authorized by Gaikindo.

=== Production car introduction ===
- Ford Ranger (facelift)
- Chrysler 300C
- Mercedes-Benz GLC (X253)
- Ford Focus (facelift)
- Toyota Avanza (facelift)
- Toyota Hilux (eight generation)

== 2016 ==
The 24th Indonesia International Motor Show was held from 7 to 17 April 2016. It was the first time the exhibition was held in April (and occasionally ending in early May) instead of July, August or September to avoid scheduling conflicts with GIIAS, which was held in July or August (previously, IIMS was held at the same time as GIIAS in 2015).

=== Production car introductions ===
- Honda Accord (ninth generation) (facelift)
- Honda Brio (first generation) (facelift)
- Honda Civic (tenth generation)
- Toyota Sienta (second generation)

== 2017 ==
The 25th Indonesia International Motor Show was held from 27 April to 7 May 2017.

=== Production car introductions ===
- Honda CR-V (fifth generation)
- Kia Rio (fourth generation)
- Mitsubishi Triton (fifth generation)
- Suzuki Ignis (auto show debut)

== 2018 ==
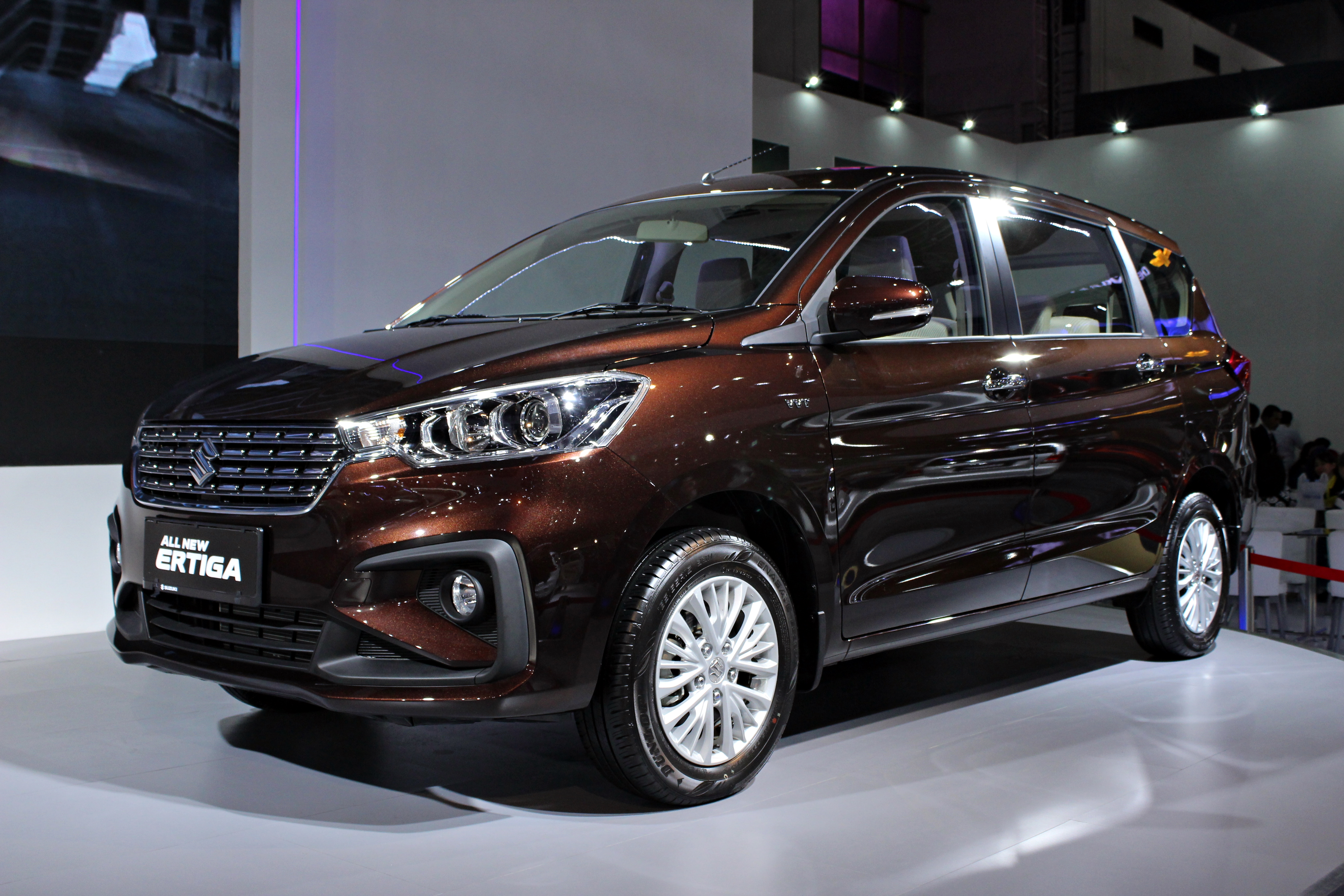
The second generation Suzuki Ertiga made its world debut at this show in 2018.

The 26th Indonesia International Motor Show was held from 19 to 29 April 2018. Chinese automakers DFSK and Wuling Motors made their first appearances at the exhibition.

=== Production car introductions ===
- Suzuki Ertiga (second generation) (world debut)
- Toyota CH-R (auto show debut)
- BMW X3 G01

== 2019 ==
The 27th Indonesia International Motor Show was sponsored by Telkomsel and held from 25 April to 5 May 2019.

=== Production car introductions ===
- DFSK Glory 560
- Honda BR-V (facelift)
- Hyundai Kona
- Suzuki Carry (2019)

== 2020 ==
The 28th Indonesia International Motor Show was planned to be held from 9 to 19 April 2020, but was suspended indefinitely due to COVID-19 pandemic. In May 2020, the organizers announced that the show would be cancelled due to an uncertain future ending of the pandemic in Indonesia; instead, they would focus on the 2021 event.

== 2021 ==
Due to the COVID-19 pandemic, the 2021 edition of Indonesia International Motor Show was split into two events: IIMS Virtual, which was held virtually on its official website, and IIMS Hybrid, which was held both in the exhibition center (in compliance with strict health protocols) and on its official website.

=== Virtual ===
The IIMS Virtual was held from 18 to 28 February 2021 (Phase 1) and 18 March to 4 April 2021 (Phase 2) on its official website.

=== Hybrid ===
The 28th Indonesia International Motor Show (organized as IIMS Hybrid) was held from 15 to 25 April 2021 at the Jakarta International Expo Kemayoran and on its official website. Responding to the COVID-19 measurements, then-Indonesian President, Joko Widodo held the inauguration of the show's opening ceremonies in a livestream filmed at the Merdeka Palace in Central Jakarta. British automaker MG Motor made their first appearance at the exhibition.

==== Production car introductions ====
- DFSK Gelora E
- Honda City (autoshow debut)
- MG ZS EV
- Renault Zoe
- Wuling Confero (facelift)

== 2022 ==
The 29th Indonesia International Motor Show (organized as IIMS Hybrid) was planned to be held from 17 to 27 February 2022, but on 7 February 2022, it was pushed back to 31 March to 10 April 2022 due to Jakarta's Level 3 Community Activities Restrictions Enforcement as the Omicron variant cases rose during the COVID-19 pandemic.

Chinese automaker Chery also joined this exhibition to mark their re-entry to the Indonesian automotive market after a 6-year absence.

=== Production car introductions ===
- Chery Tiggo 8
- Chery Tiggo 7
- Chery Skytour
- Chery Omoda 5
- Chery eQ1
- Honda HR-V (third generation) (auto show debut)
- Hyundai Ioniq 5
- MG 5 GT
- Mazda CX-5 (second generation) (facelift)
- Wuling Cortez (facelift)

=== Concept car introductions ===
- Toyota Kijang Innova EV Concept (first day only)

== 2023 ==
The 30th Indonesia International Motor Show (organized as IIMS BOOST., stands for Bringing Opportunity for Otomotive Society Together) was held from 16 to 26 February 2023. It was the first time the exhibition was held in February. Esemka, an Indonesian automotive company, also joined this exhibition.

=== Production car introductions ===
- Chery Omoda 5
- Esemka Bima EV
- MG4 EV
- Subaru WRX (second generation)
- Subaru WRX wagon
- Suzuki Grand Vitara (2022)
- Toyota Corolla Cross Hybrid GR Sport
- Wuling Alvez

=== Concept car introductions ===
- Mitsubishi XFC Concept

== 2024 ==
The 31st Indonesia International Motor Show was held from 15 to 25 February 2024. Chinese automaker BYD made its first appearance at the exhibition. Vietnamese automaker VinFast also joined this exhibition to mark their entry to the Indonesian automotive market.

=== Production car introductions ===
- Chery Tiggo 5x
- BYD Atto 3
- BYD Dolphin
- BYD Seal
- Denza D9
- Hyundai Kona Electric (second generation)
- MG ES
- MG Maxus 9
- Suzuki Jimny 5-door
- Toyota Hilux Rangga
- Toyota Vellfire (third generation)
- VinFast VF 5
- VinFast VF 6
- VinFast VF 7
- VinFast VF 8
- VinFast VF 9
- VinFast VF e34
- Wuling Cloud EV

=== Concept car introductions ===
- Hyundai SEVEN

== 2025 ==
The 32nd Indonesia International Motor Show was held from 13 to 23 February 2025. Chinese automobile brand Jaecoo made its first appearance at the exhibition. This 2025 show also marks the return of Chinese automaker Geely at the exhibition since 2012.

=== Production car introductions ===
- BYD Sealion 7
- Chery Tiggo Cross
- Honri Boma
- Hyundai Venue
- Jaecoo J5 EV (world debut)
- Jetour X50e
- Toyota Camry (XV80)
- Toyota Corolla Cross (facelift)
- VinFast VF 3

=== Concept car introductions ===
- Suzuki eWX
- Wuling Light of ASEAN

== 2026 ==
The 33rd Indonesia International Motor Show was held from 5 to 15 February 2026. Chinese automobile brand Lepas, Zeekr, iCar, Changan made its first appearance at the exhibition. Leapmotor was scheduled to debut at the show but was canceled. The 2026 show saw a larger participation list of 71 different exhibited brands (35 in the passenger vehicle category, 26 in the motorcycle category). Absent brands include Denza, and Aletra.

=== Production car introductions ===
- Kia Carens (facelift)
- Kia PV5
- Kia Seltos (second generation)
- XPeng P7 (Indonesia debut)
- Wuling Eksion
- Suzuki Xbee
- Zeekr 7X
- Lepas E4 (world debut)
- iCar V23 (Indonesia debut)
- Toyota GR Corolla (facelift)
- GAC E8
- MGS5 EV
