= Kaiyi Showjet =

Subcompact crossover SUV

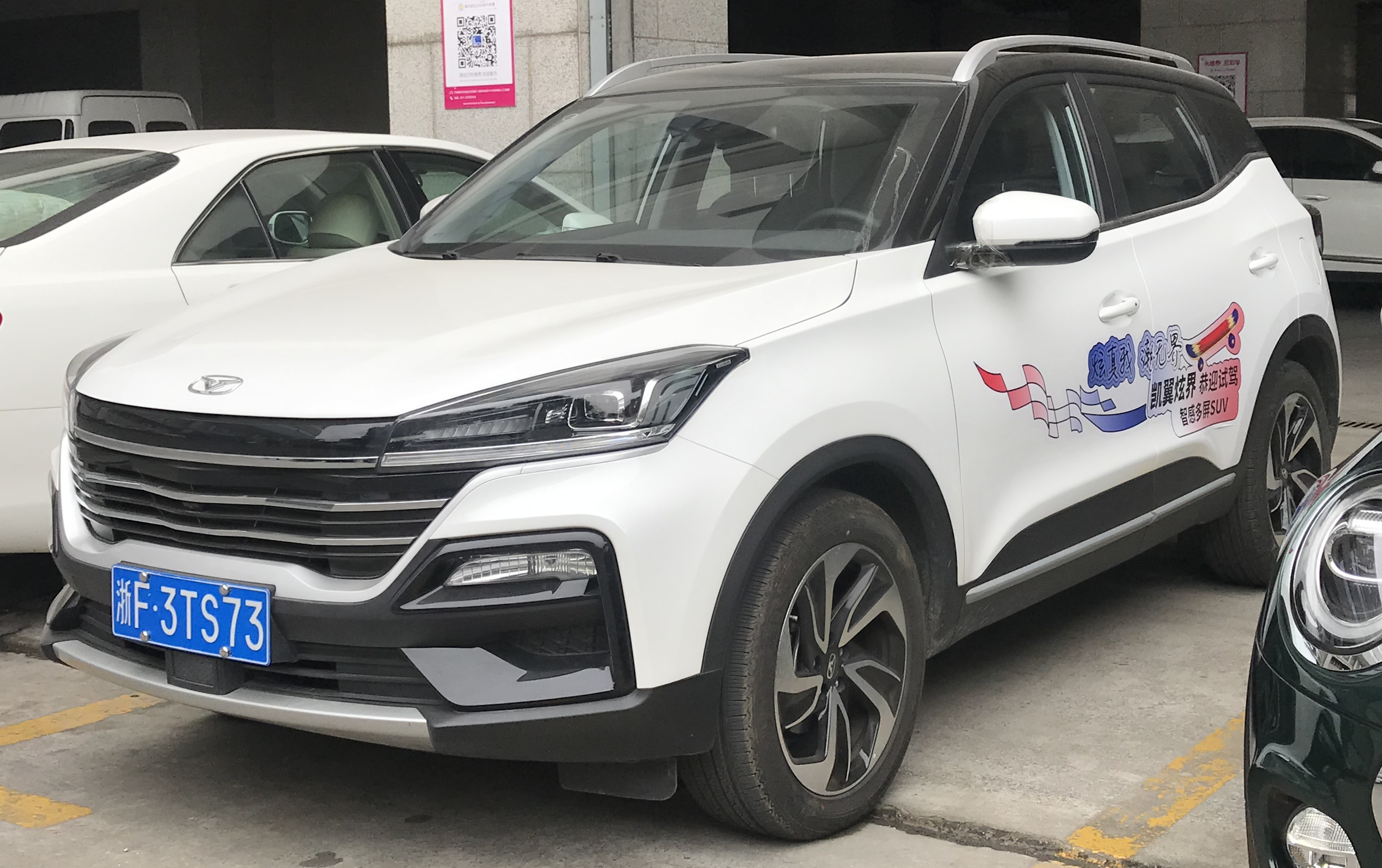

Overview
- Manufacturer: Kaiyi Auto
- Also called: EMC Wave 3 (Italy, 2022–2024); EMC 6 (Italy, 2025–present); Kaiyi X3/X3 Pro (export); Lamari Neo (Iran); GTV Soben (Cambodia); Jetour X50e (export); Jetour eVT5 (EV, Malaysia); EVO Cuatro (Spain)
- Production: 2020–present
- Assembly: China: Wuhu, Anhui; Russia: Kaliningrad; Iran: Khomeyn (Arian Pars Motor)
- Designer: Yu Chen (Pininfarina)

Body and chassis
- Class: Subcompact crossover SUV (C)
- Body style: 5-door SUV
- Layout: Front-engine, front-wheel-drive
- Related: Chery Omoda 5; Chery Tiggo 5x; Chery Tiggo 7; Chery Tiggo 8; Exeed LX

Powertrain
- Engine: Petrol: 1.5 L E4G15C I4; 1.5 L E4T15C I4 turbo (Pro)
- Power output: 85 kW (114 hp; 116 PS); 115 kW (154 hp; 156 PS) (Pro)
- Transmission: 6-speed manual; CVT

Dimensions
- Wheelbase: 2,632 mm (103.6 in)
- Length: 4,400 mm (173.2 in)
- Width: 1,831 mm (72.1 in)
- Height: 1,653 mm (65.1 in)
- Curb weight: 1,321–1,346 kg (2,912–2,967 lb)

The Kaiyi Showjet (Chinese: 炫界) is a subcompact crossover SUV produced by the Chinese manufacturer Kaiyi Auto. The model shared the platform with the earlier introduced Chery Tiggo 5x and is designed by Pininfarina.

== Overview ==
The Kaiyi Showjet was revealed on 24 December 2019. The Showjet is positioned below the compact Kaiyi X3 as Kaiyi's latest budget crossover.

The Kaiyi Showjet was sold with a lone engine option, a 1.5-litre inline-4 engine mated to either a 5-speed manual gearbox or a CVT delivering 116 PS (85 kW; 114 hp) and 143 N⋅m (105 lb⋅ft; 14.6 kg⋅m) of torque.

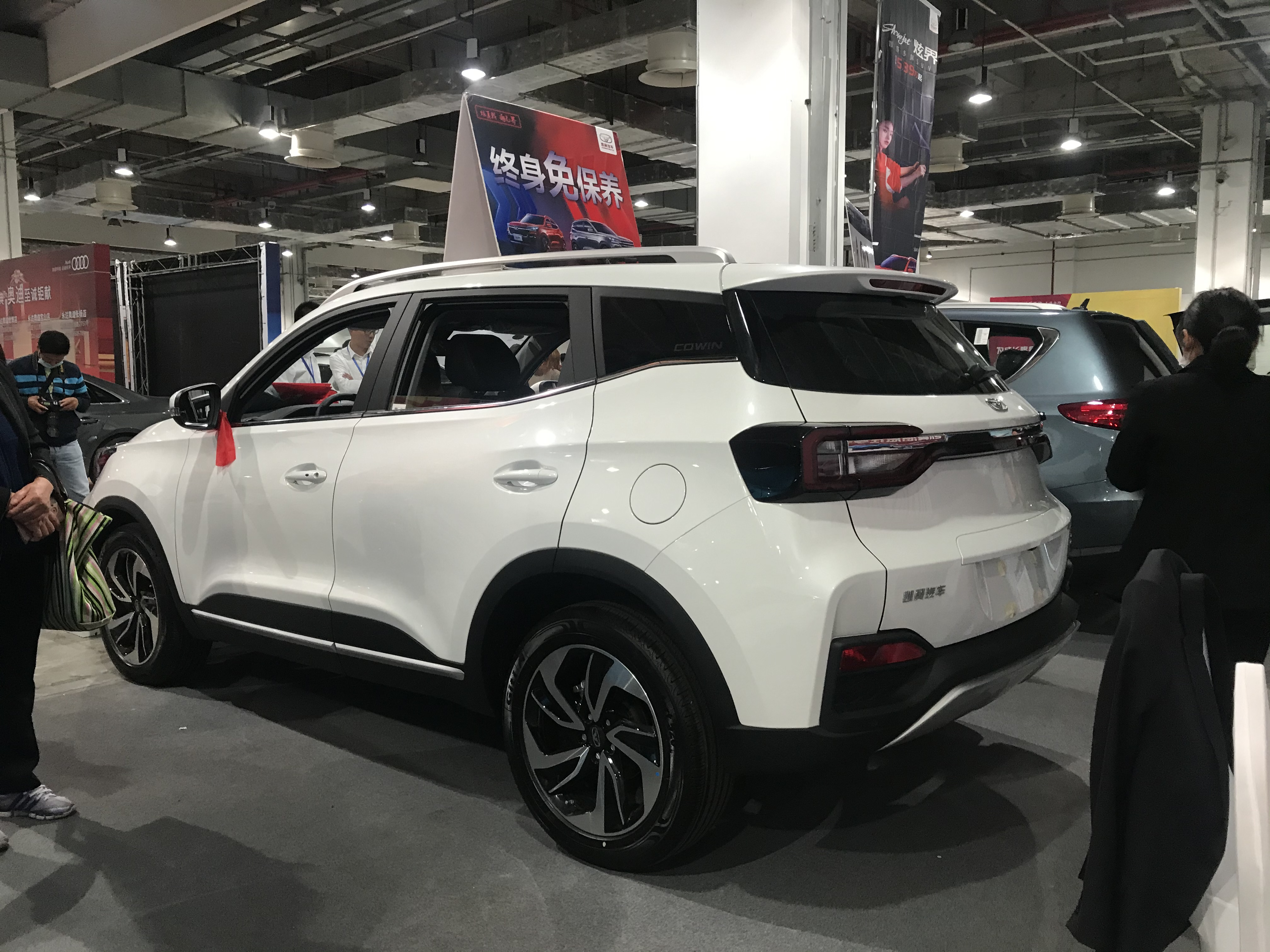
Rear view

== Kaiyi Showjet Pro ==
A variant called the Kaiyi Showjet Pro was launched in 2021, with the production of the Showjet Pro starting in March 2021. The Kaiyi Showjet Pro features a redesigned front fascia and a variant of the engine of the regular Showjet, the SQRE4T15 1.5-litre inline-4 turbo engine, producing 115 kW (154 hp; 156 PS).

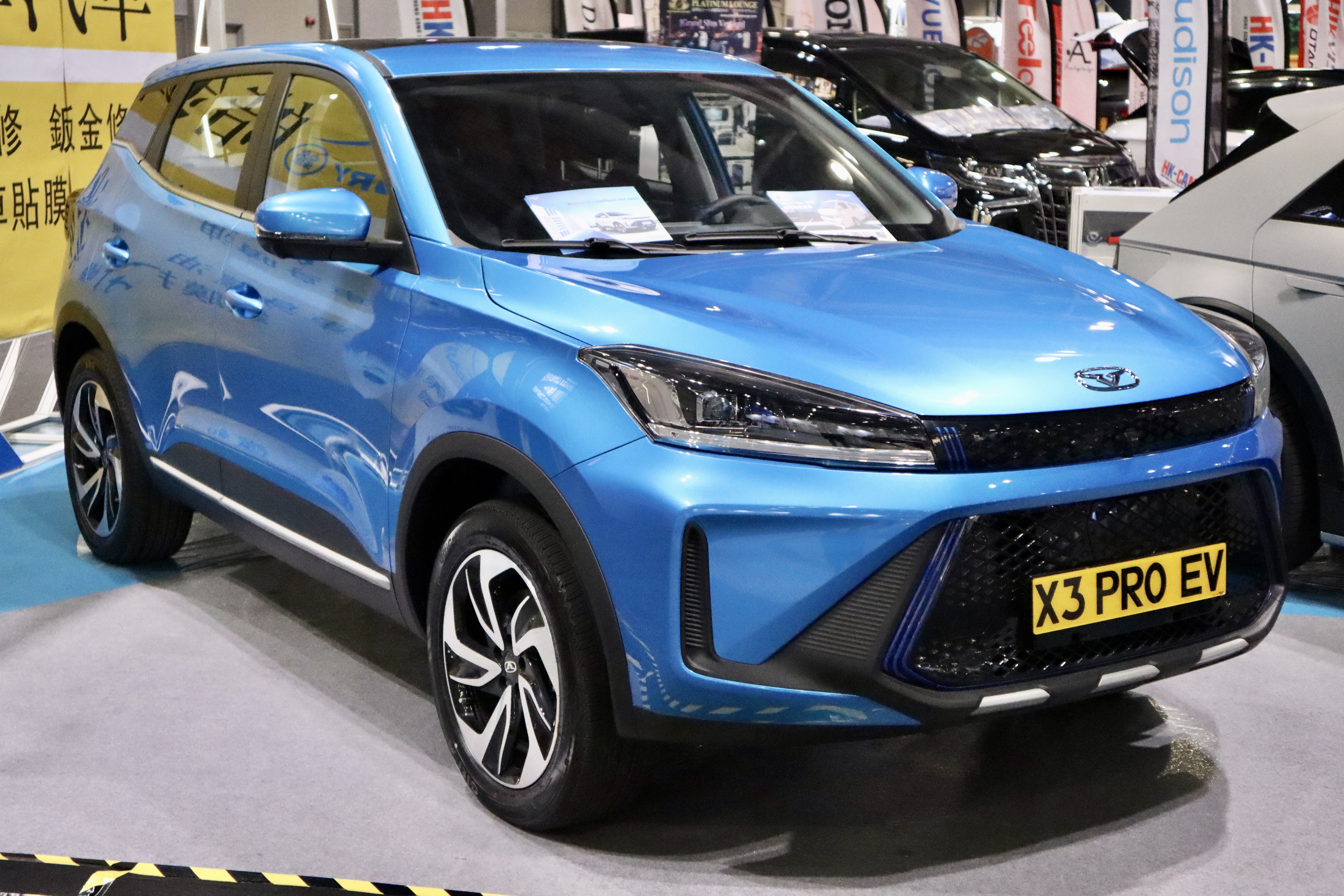
Kaiyi Showjet Pro

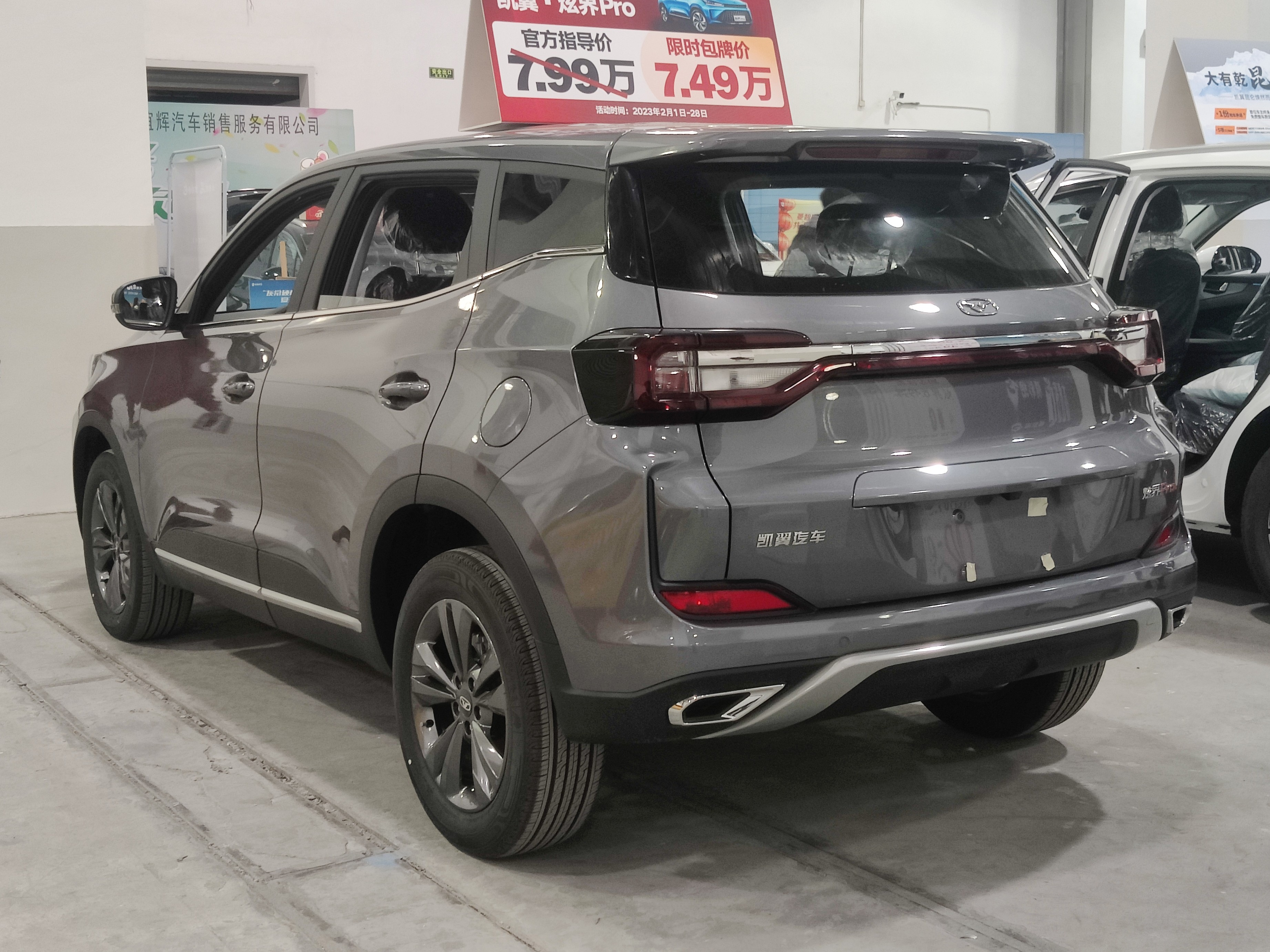
Rear view

== EMC Wave 3 ==
In September 2022, Eurasia Motor Company (local importer of Great Wall and Haval) launched a new brand named EMC and renamed the Showjet Pro as the EMC Wave 3 in Italy. It is manufactured in Sichuan, China, and converted to LPG in Piedmont, Northern Italy.

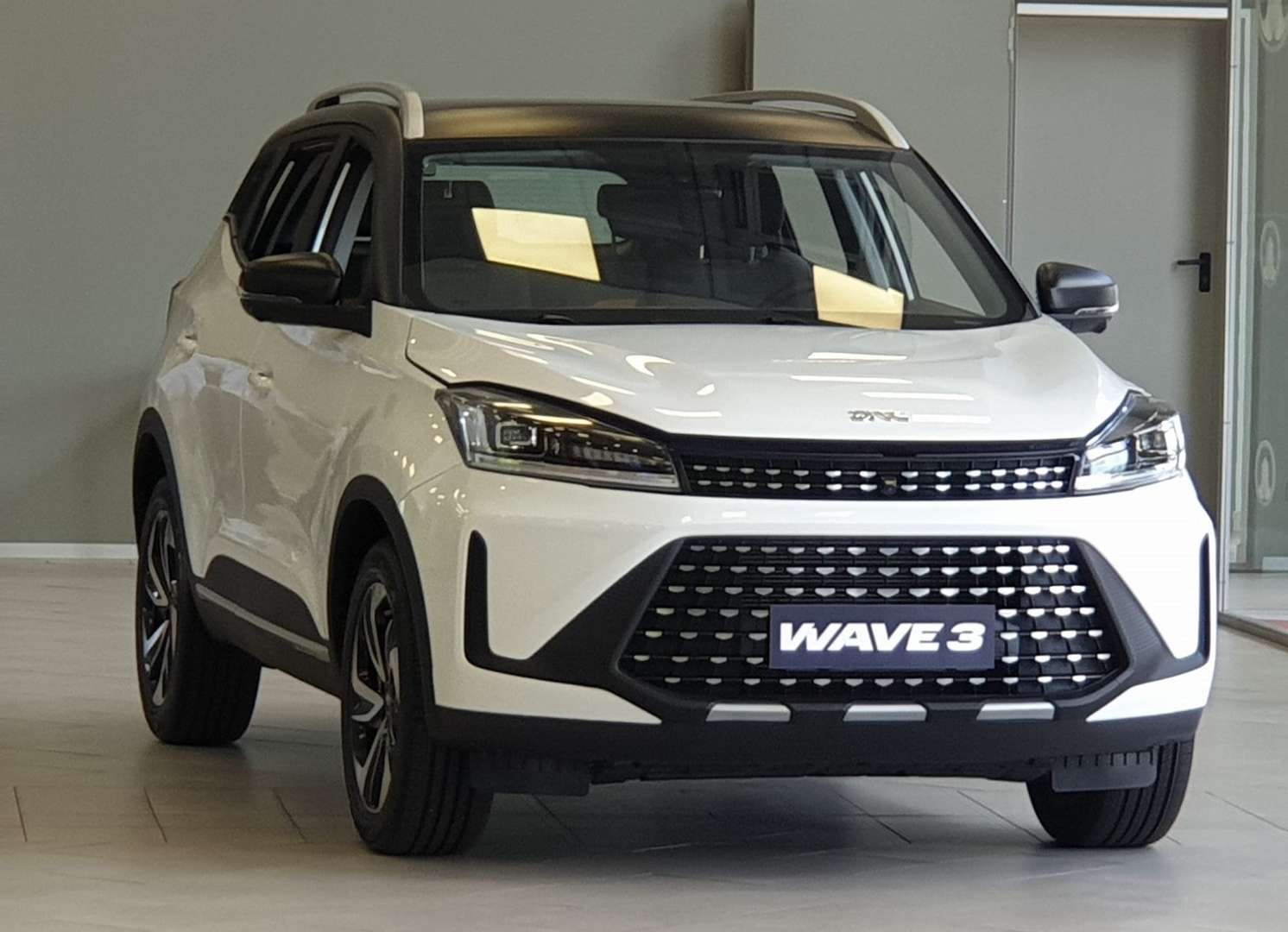
EMC Wave 3

=== 2024 facelift ===
In February 2024, the more expensive, more modern Showjet Pro variant underwent a restyling. The car gained a redesigned front fascia with a lower air intake, a reshaped bumper, and distinctive teardrop-shaped bezels under the headlights. Furthermore, the passenger compartment was redesigned, including a new multimedia screen.

== Kaiyi Showjet Pro EV ==
In mid-2021, the restyled Showjet model range was to be expanded with a fully electric variant called the Cowin Showjet Pro EV. Visually, it gained a redesigned front fascia with air intake covers, and the electric system created a 163 hp engine. The car did not go into production until 2024 as the Kaiyi Showjet Pro EV.

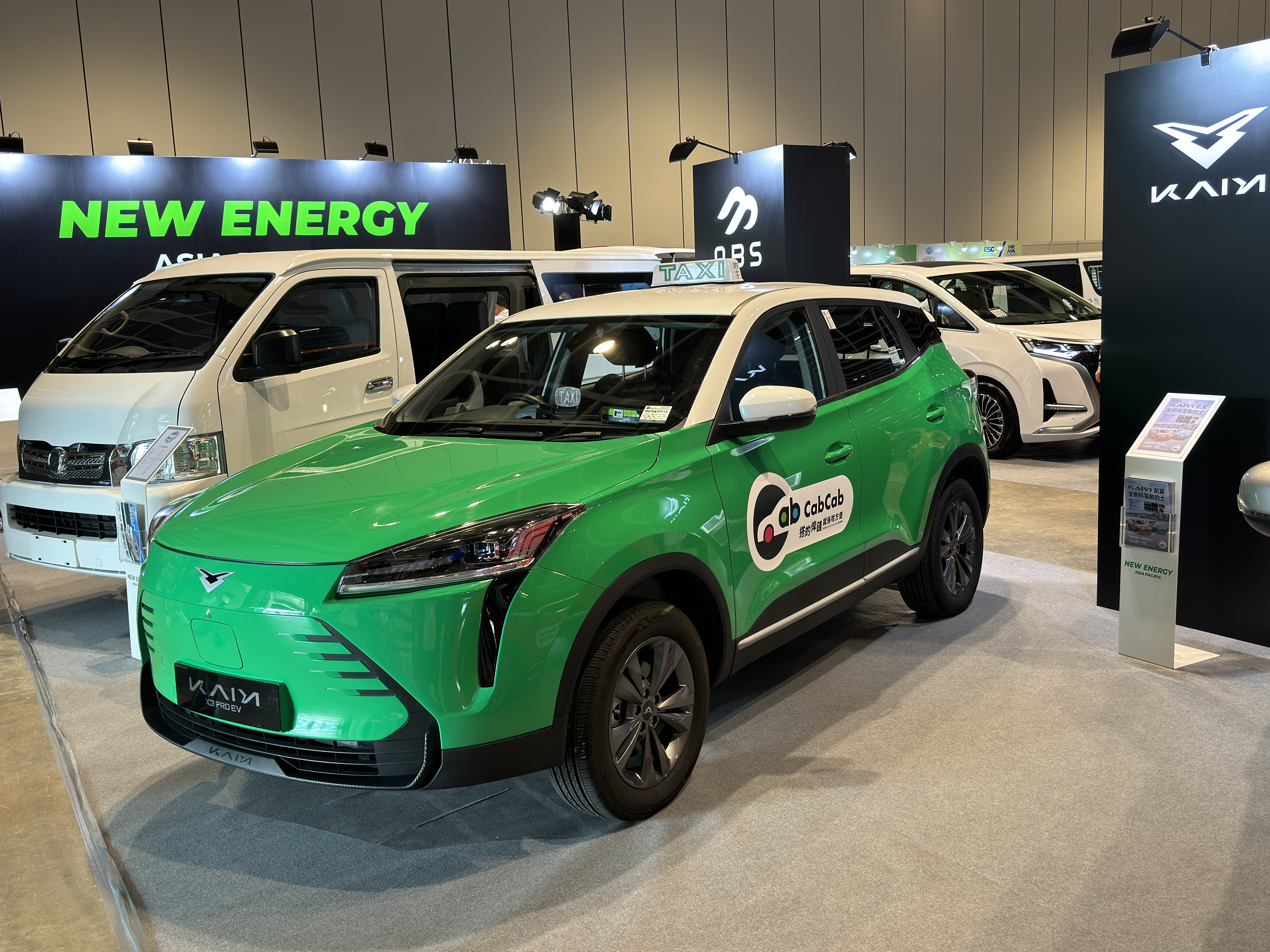
Kaiyi Showjet Pro EV taxi in Hong Kong

== Jetour X50e ==
In several oversea markets, the Jetour X50e is a rebaged variant of the Kaiyi Showjet Pro EV. The Jetour X50e was released in 2025 in Indonesia and was showcased at the 2025 Gaikindo Indonesia International Auto Show (GIIAS).

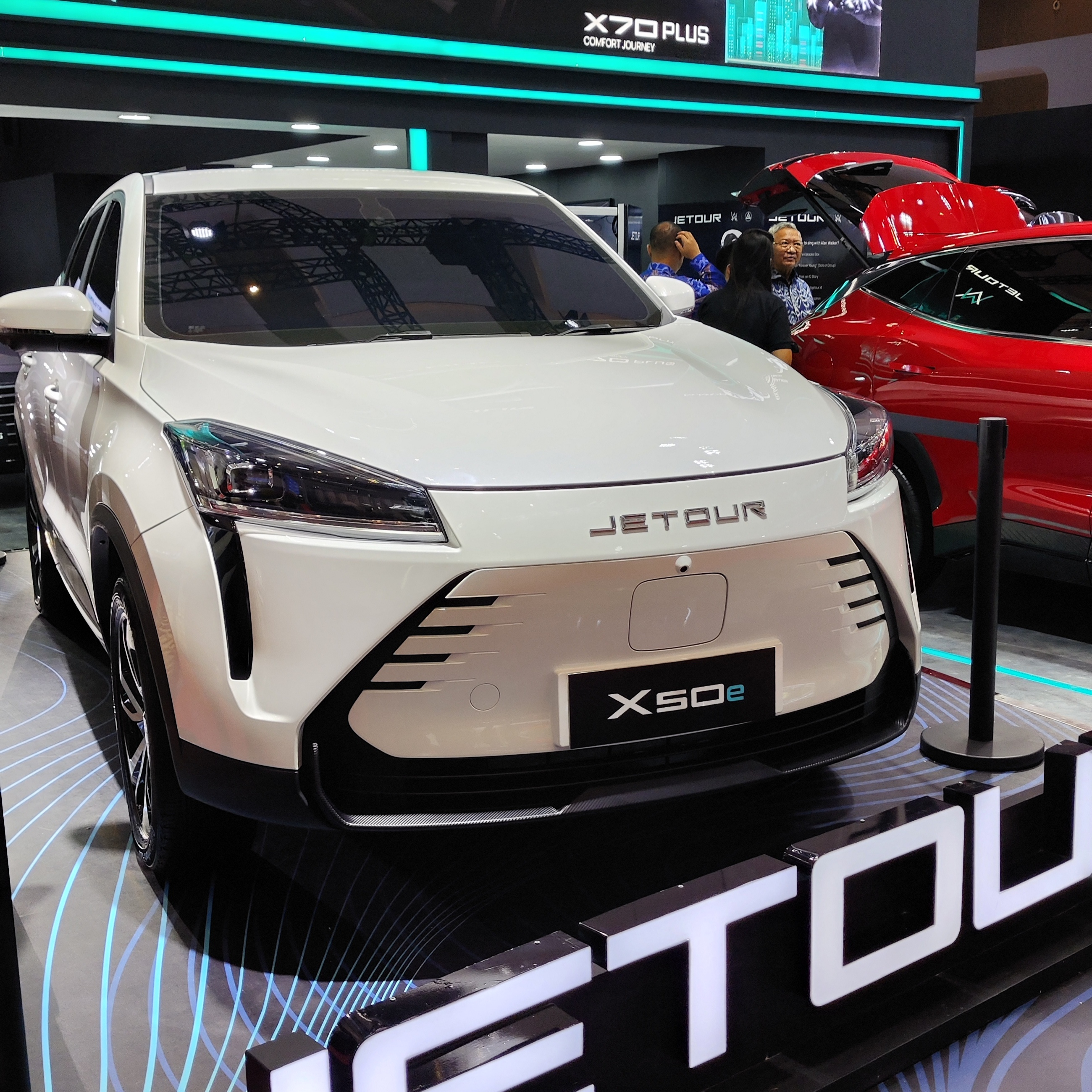
Jetour X50e
