= Alabama International Auto Show =

Coordinates: 33°31′29″N 86°48′39″W

Alabama Auto Show

The Alabama Auto Show is held each year at the Birmingham Jefferson Convention Complex, in Birmingham, Alabama.

This event is organized by the Birmingham Automobile Dealers Association. Vehicles representing domestic and imported car and truck lines are on display across the exhibition halls at the BJCC.

The Suzuki Grand Vitara "Blizzard" Concept Car was introduced during the 2007 Show.

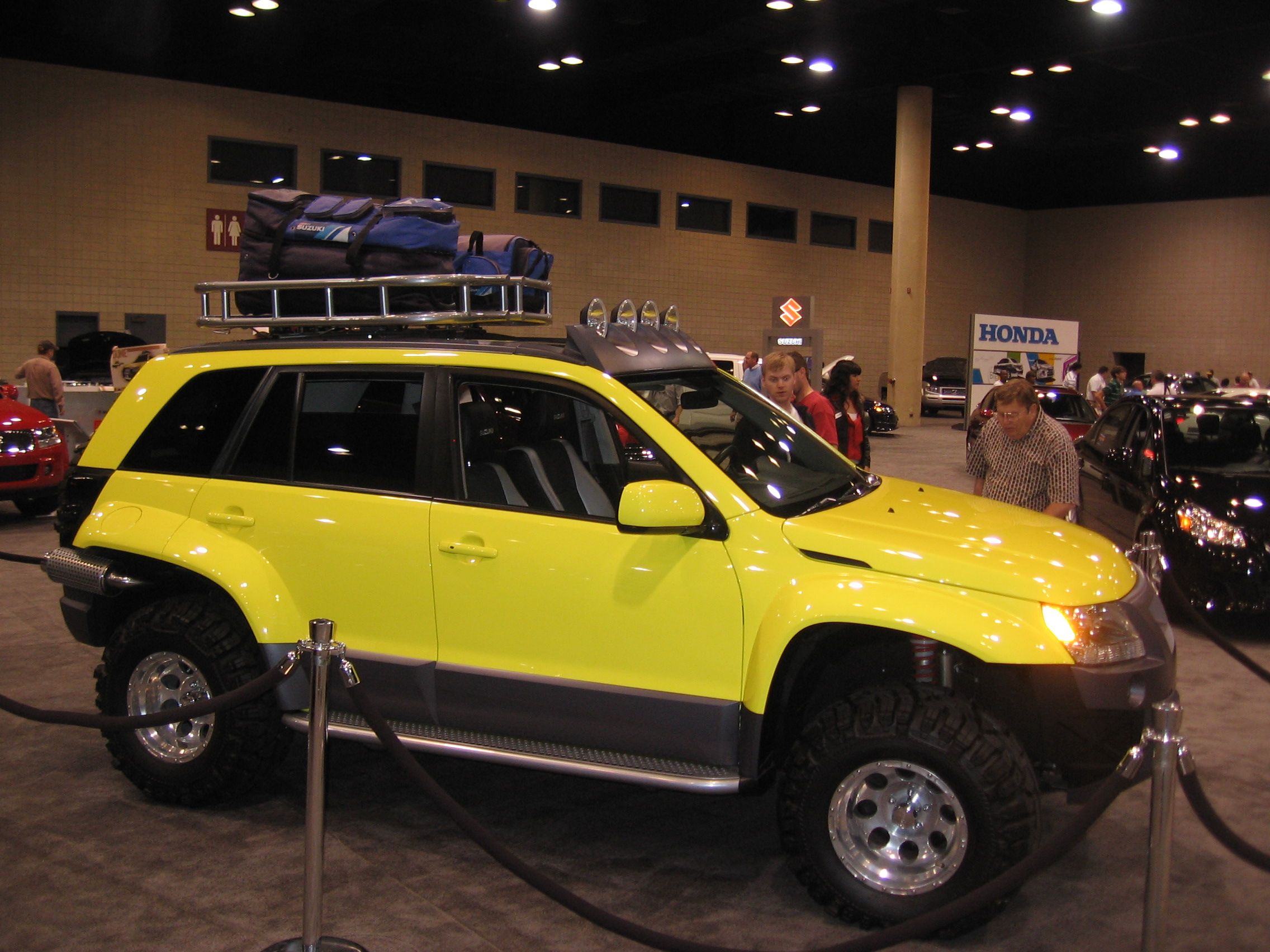
Suzuki Grand Vitara "Blizzard" Concept car

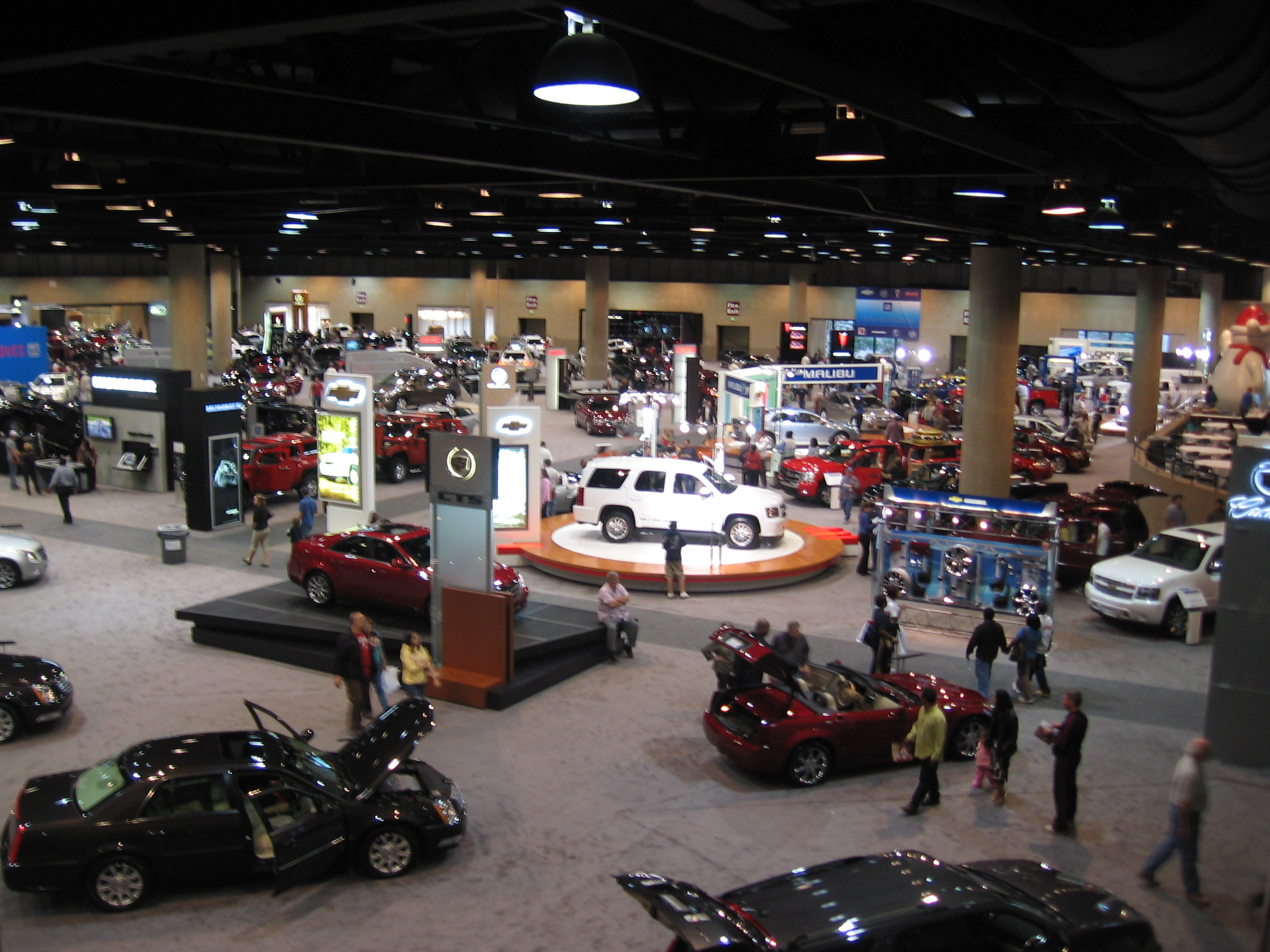
Aerial view of the vehicles
