= Manila International Auto Show =

Annual motor show in the Philippines

- Status: Active
- Venue: World Trade Center Metro Manila
- Locations: Pasay, Philippines
- Country: Philippines
- Inaugurated: Since 2005
- Website: manilaautoshow.com

The Manila International Auto Show is a large motor show located in the Philippines, with 170,900 people attending the 2025 show, featuring over 310 cars from 145 exhibitors. The show is organized by Worldbex Services International. Brands that have participated in the show include Jetour, GAC, BYD, Kia, Foton, VinFast, ROX, BAIC, Chery, Suzuki, Changan, MG, Nissan, Aito, Bestune, GWM, Lynk & Co, Omoda, Jaecoo, Hyundai, Tesla, and Isuzu.

== History of the Manila International Auto Show ==
In 2005, Jason Ang, Ulysses Ang, and Alvin Uy, inspired by their visits to auto shows in other countries, approached Worldbex Services International to talk about setting up an auto show in the Philippines. It was christened as the Manila Motor Show, and attracted 68,000 visitors.

In 2006, the show was renamed to the Manila International Auto Show. The Chamber of Automotive Manufacturers of the Philippines joined Worldbex Services International in organizing the event.
