= Omoda O4 =

Compact crossover SUV

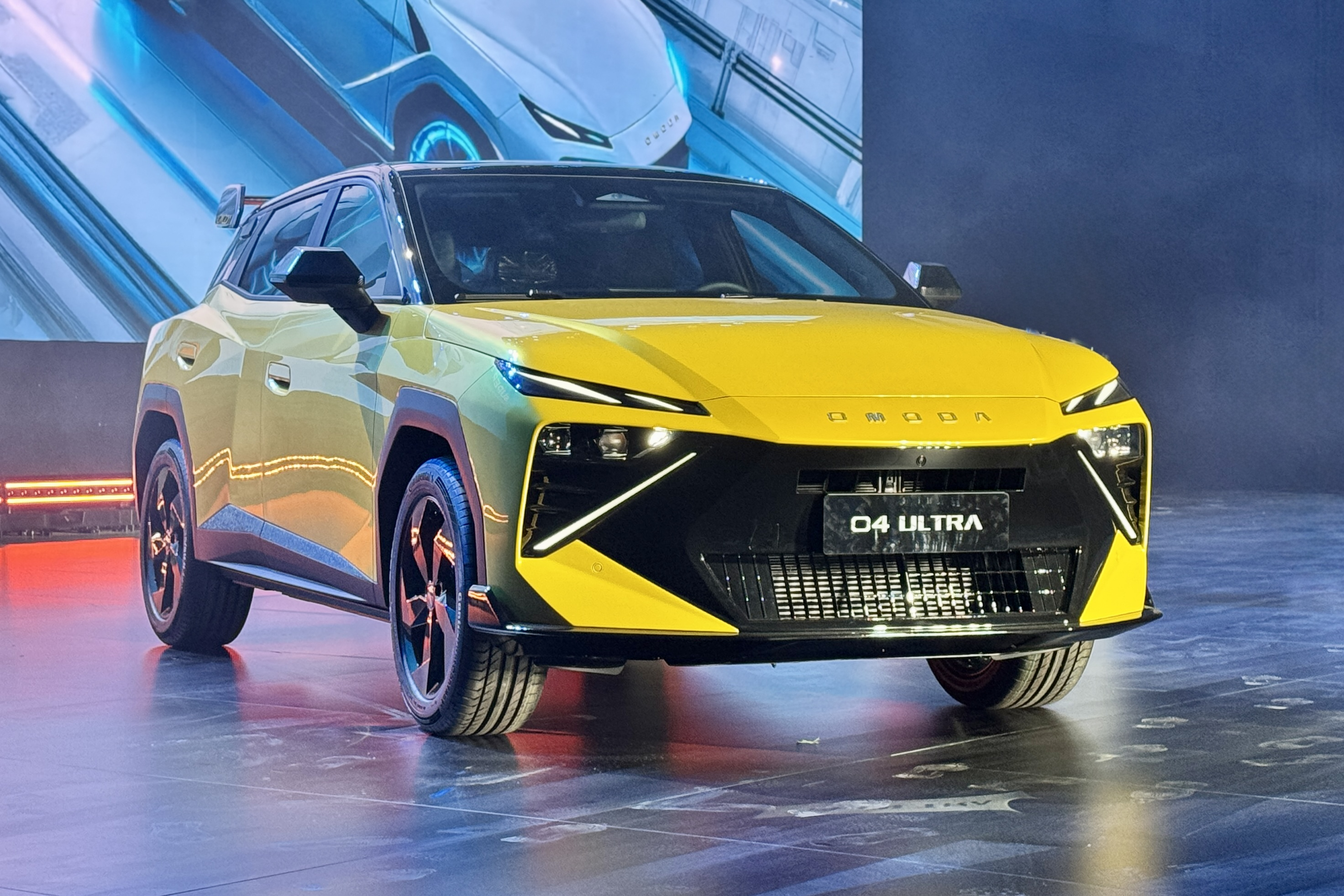

Overview
- Manufacturer: Omoda (Chery)
- Model code: T13C
- Also called: Omoda C4; Jeland C4 (Russia); Ecoda E5 (Iran)
- Production: April 2026 – present
- Assembly: China: Wuhu, Anhui; Indonesia: Bekasi, West Java (HIM); Bogor, West Java (Inchcape Indomobil); South Africa: Rosslyn, Gauteng (Chery SA)

Body and chassis
- Class: Compact crossover SUV (C)
- Body style: 5-door SUV
- Layout: Front-engine, front-wheel-drive; Front-motor, front-wheel-drive (EV)
- Platform: T1X platform
- Related: Omoda C5

Powertrain
- Engine: Petrol: 1.5 L SQRE4T15C turbo I4; 1.6 L SQRF4J16 turbo I4; Petrol hybrid: 1.5 L turbo I4 (SHS-H/CSH)
- Electric motor: Permanent magnet synchronous reluctance motor (EV)
- Hybrid drivetrain: Series-parallel hybrid (SHS-H/CSH)
- Battery: 1.83 kWh (SHS-H/CSH); 50.6 kWh CATL LFP (EV); 65.05 kWh LFP Gotion (EV)
- Electric range: 400–470 km (249–292 mi) (WLTP); 420–553 km (261–344 mi) (NEDC)

Dimensions
- Wheelbase: 2,620–2,672 mm (103.1–105.2 in)
- Length: 4,400 mm (173.2 in)
- Width: 1,860 mm (73.2 in)
- Height: 1,650–1,680 mm (65.0–66.1 in)
- Kerb weight: 1,400–1,710 kg (3,086–3,770 lb)

The Omoda O4 (initially introduced as the Omoda C3/3 and Omoda 4), and also called the Omoda C4 in some markets, is a compact crossover SUV by Chery and marketed through the export-only Omoda brand.

== Overview ==
In April 2025, The Chery presented another model, after the larger Omoda C7, developed from scratch specifically for its global brand Omoda, without borrowing from the existing range of the parent manufacturer. Initially, the car was named Omoda C3/3, however, when more information was presented in October 2025, it was renamed to Omoda 4. The final name was designated as Omoda O4. The car took the form of a compact crossover with avant-garde styling, rich in sharp creases, a front fascia dominated by a large air intake and aggressively shaped double-row headlights. The wheel arches were also prominently accentuated, while the rear lights took on an unusual boomerang shape, connected by a light strip running the full width of the body.

The passenger cabin features a design already familiar from models from the related brand Jaecoo, with a high center tunnel housing an armrest, two cupholders, and a wireless smartphone charger. A digital instrument display sits behind the two-spoke steering wheel, and a large, vertical touchscreen multimedia system sits in the center of the cockpit, also used to control the vehicle's main settings, navigation, and air conditioning.

The O4 was designed to be powered by both pure combustion and electrified systems. The base engine is a four-cylinder, turbocharged 1.6-liter petrol engine with 147 hp and 275 Nm of maximum torque. Additionally, a hybrid variant is planned, developing a combined output of 224 hp and 295 Nm of maximum torque.

== Markets ==
=== Indonesia ===
The O4 was launched in Indonesia on 27 July 2026, marking the right-hand drive debut and global debut outside China. It was offered with sole unnamed EV variant. The O4 marks the debut of the Super AI cockpit infotainment system.

=== South Africa ===
It was announced in October 2026 that the Omoda C4 would be the first vehicle produced by Chery SA at its new Rosslyn plant in Gauteng. Chery said the C4 would launch in SA in 2027, and be offered in petrol, hybrid, and fully electric variants.
