= Omoda =

Marque of vehicle manufacturer Chery

- Type: Division
- Industry: Automotive
- Founded: 2022; 4 years ago
- Headquarters: Wuhu, Anhui, China
- Area served: Worldwide (except China, US, Canada)
- Key people: Shawn Xu (Omoda & Jaecoo CEO)
- Products: Automobiles
- Parent: Chery Automobile
- Website: omodajaecoo.com

Omoda is a brand of Chinese vehicle manufacturer Chery Automobile that was established in 2022. As a sub-division of Chery International, Omoda and Jaecoo are two sister brands owned by Chery that are only marketed outside China to support its export strategy. Omoda is typically positioned as a more premium brand compared to the more mainstream Chery brand. In many markets, the brand shares the same dealers with Jaecoo.

According to Chery, the letter "O" from Omoda is derived from the word "oxygen", while "Moda" means "modern". In Iran, the brand is known as Ecoda.

== History ==
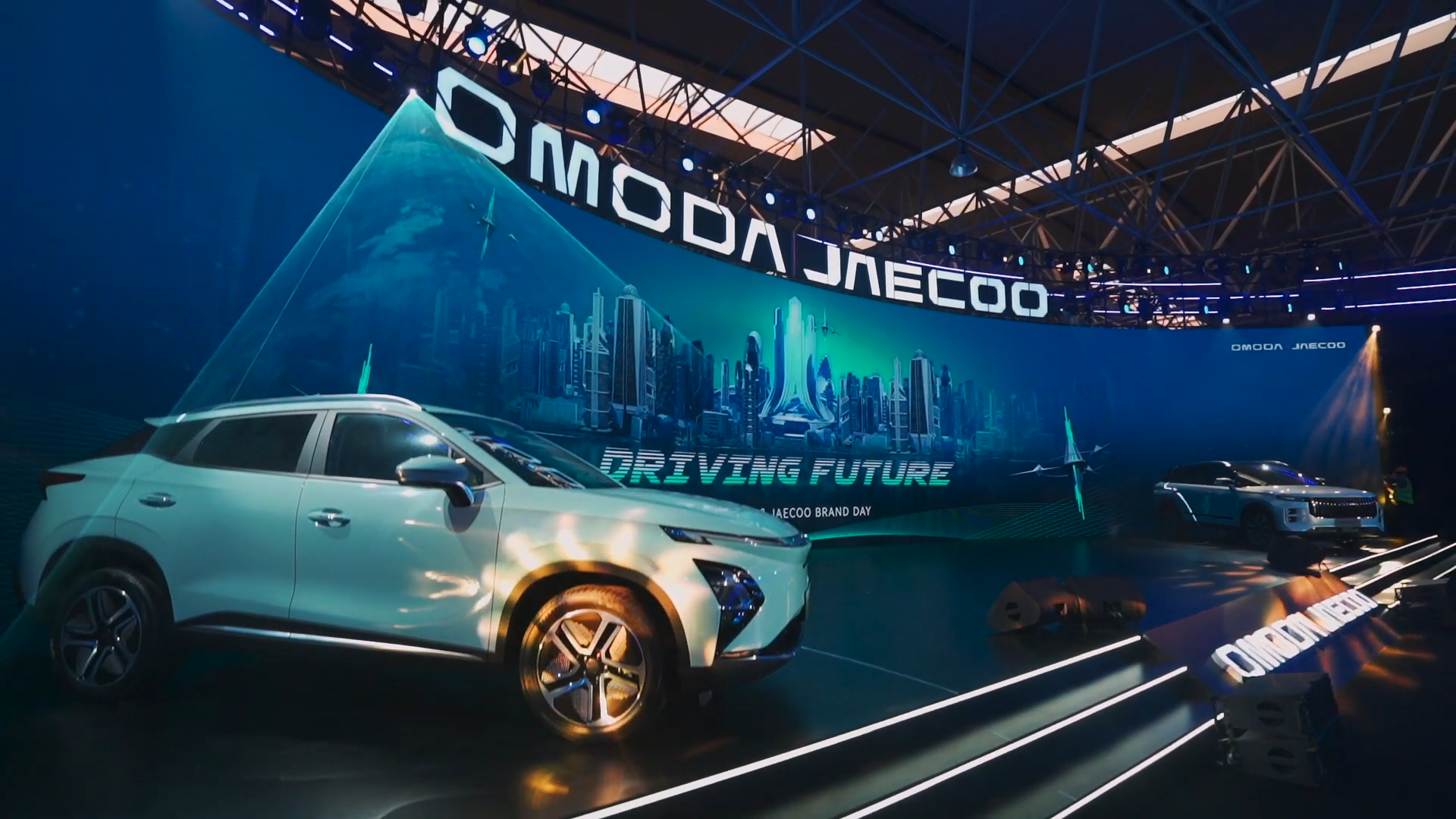
Omoda and Jaecoo brand launch in Wuhu, Anhui

In June 2022, the decision to separate the Omoda family from the Chery marque and establish it as an independent brand was announced for the Russian market. The global debut of the Omoda marque was held in April 2023 in Wuhu, Anhui, China, alongside the Jaecoo marque. The two brands combined (referred to as "O&J" brands) were targeted to reach annual global sales of 1,400,000 units by 2030 (not including China). In the same month, Chery established a separate company in China called Anhui Omoda Jaecoo Automobile Co., Ltd. as a sales company.

Chery president Zhang Guibing mentioned that Omoda will serve customers who are part of the "Fashion Elite", a group of fashion-oriented customers that are "dynamic, avantgarde, and fashion-centric". Omoda's brand direction is headed by Steve Eum, Vice President & General Manager of Design for Chery in China.

In April 2024, Omoda introduced the Omoda C7 in Wuhu, Anhui. In April 2025, Omoda introduced the Omoda C3.

By August 2025, 27 months after their brand introduction, Omoda and Jaecoo had jointly reached 600,000 vehicle sales worldwide.

== Markets ==
=== Europe ===
==== Western Europe ====
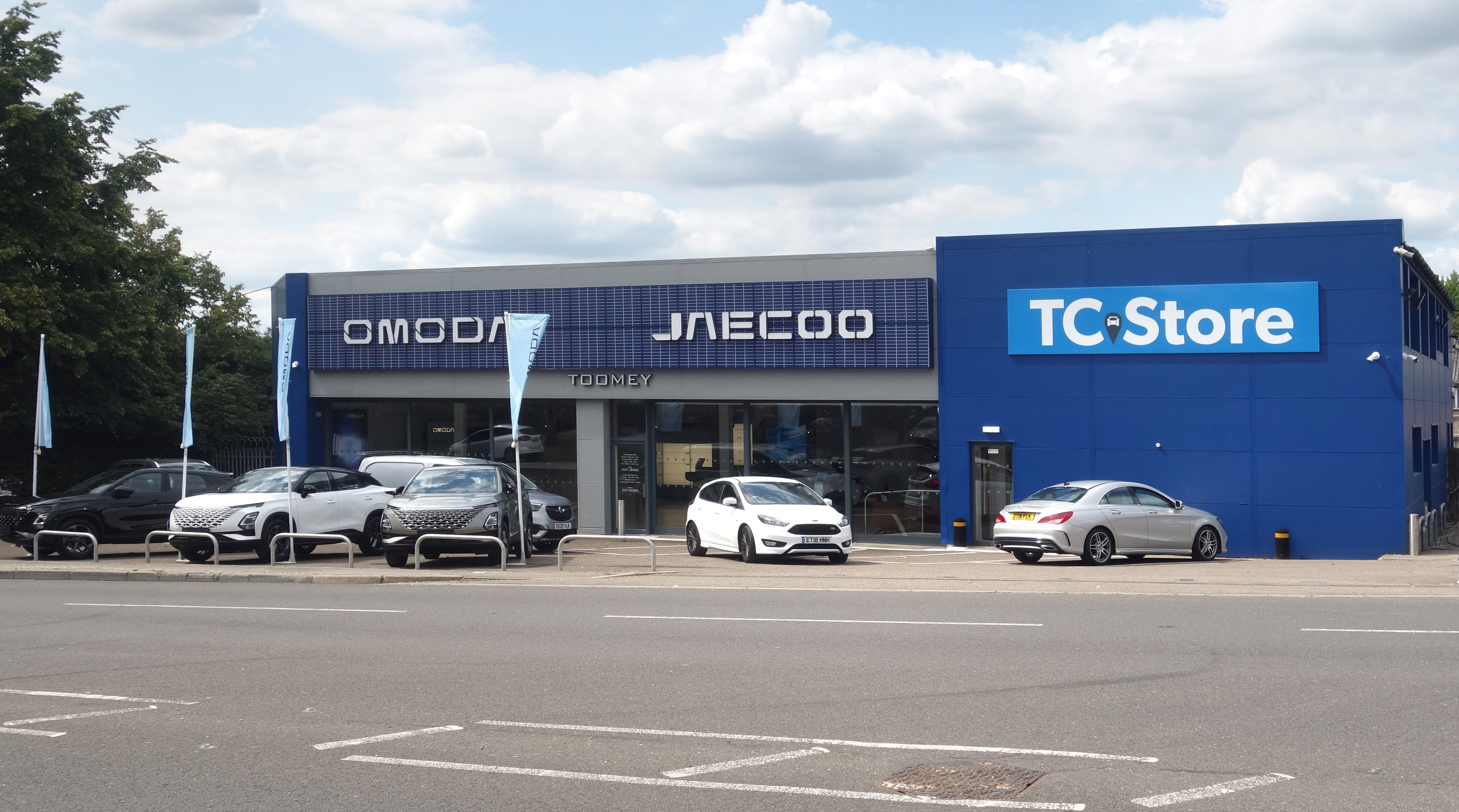
An Omoda-Jaecoo dealership in Brentwood, Essex, UK

Omoda entered Western European markets in 2024, starting with Spain in March 2024. In April 2024, Chery signed a joint venture deal with Spanish company EV Motors to build Omoda vehicles in a former Nissan factory in Barcelona, Spain. The brand entered the United Kingdom in May 2024, selling the Omoda 5 and Omoda E5. Omoda officially debuts in Italy in July 2024 alongside Jaecoo, with the Omoda 5 model.

==== Russia ====
The establishment of Omoda as an independent brand was announced for the Russian market in June 2022, making Russia the first country to receive the brand. According to Chery, Omoda brand cars in Russia will occupy the middle-high segment above the Chery brand, and below the Exeed brand. The company mentioned the Omoda marque would be a "worthy alternative" to Japanese and German brands that have suspended their activities in Russia.

Its first product, the Omoda C5 went on sale in Russia in October 2022.

=== South Africa ===
In April 2023, the Omoda marque was introduced in South Africa as a "luxury" brand. While Omoda is a separate business unit in the market, Omoda brand cars are sold through Chery dealerships, and supported by Chery's parts supply and customer support.

=== Mexico ===
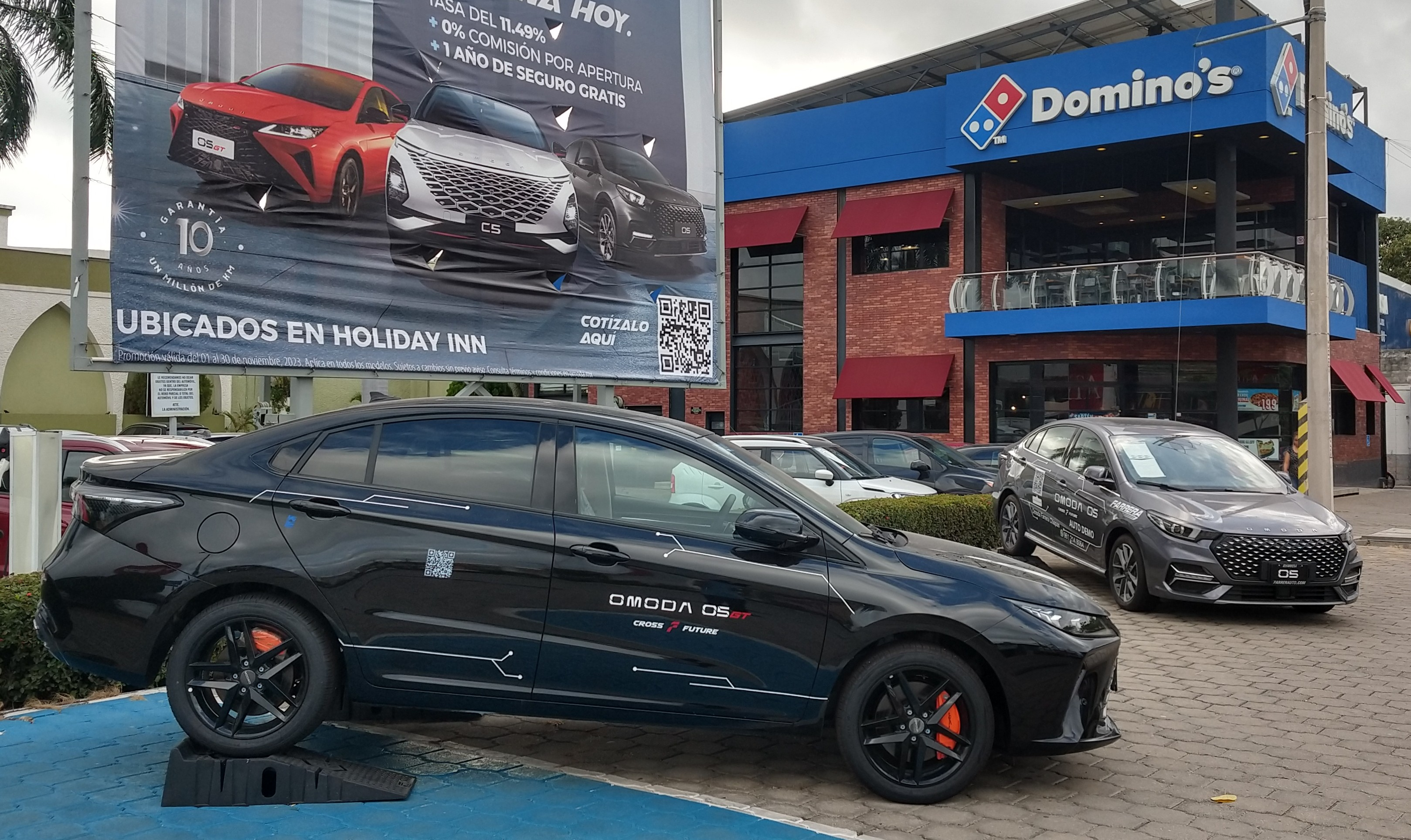
Omoda cars in a dealership in Mexico

In May 2023, Omoda in Mexico became an independent brand from Chery (Chirey in Mexico), resulting in the rebranding of the Chirey Omoda 5 as the Omoda C5. The marque also announced the planned release of the Omoda O5 and Omoda C5 EV, and will open 70 dealers across the country shared with the upcoming Jaecoo brand.

== Products ==
- Omoda 3 (2024–present), rebadged Chery Tiggo 3x, Morocco only
- Omoda 4 (upcoming), subcompact SUV
  - Omoda 4 Ultra (hybrid, upcoming)
  - Omoda 4 EV (battery electric, upcoming)
- Omoda C5/5 (2022–present), rebadged Chery Omoda 5
  - Omoda C5/5 SHS-H (hybrid, 2025–present)
  - Omoda E5/C5 EV (battery electric, 2024–present)
- Omoda C7/7 (2025–present), rebadged Chery Tiggo 7L
  - Omoda C7/7 SHS-P (plug-in hybrid, 2025–present)
- Omoda C9/O9/9 (2024–present), rebadged Exeed RX/Yaoguang
  - Omoda C9/9 SHS-P/PHEV (plug-in hybrid, 2024–present)
- Omoda S5/O5 (2023–present), rebadged Chery Arrizo 5 Plus
- Omoda S5/O5 GT (2023–present), rebadged Chery Arrizo 5 GT
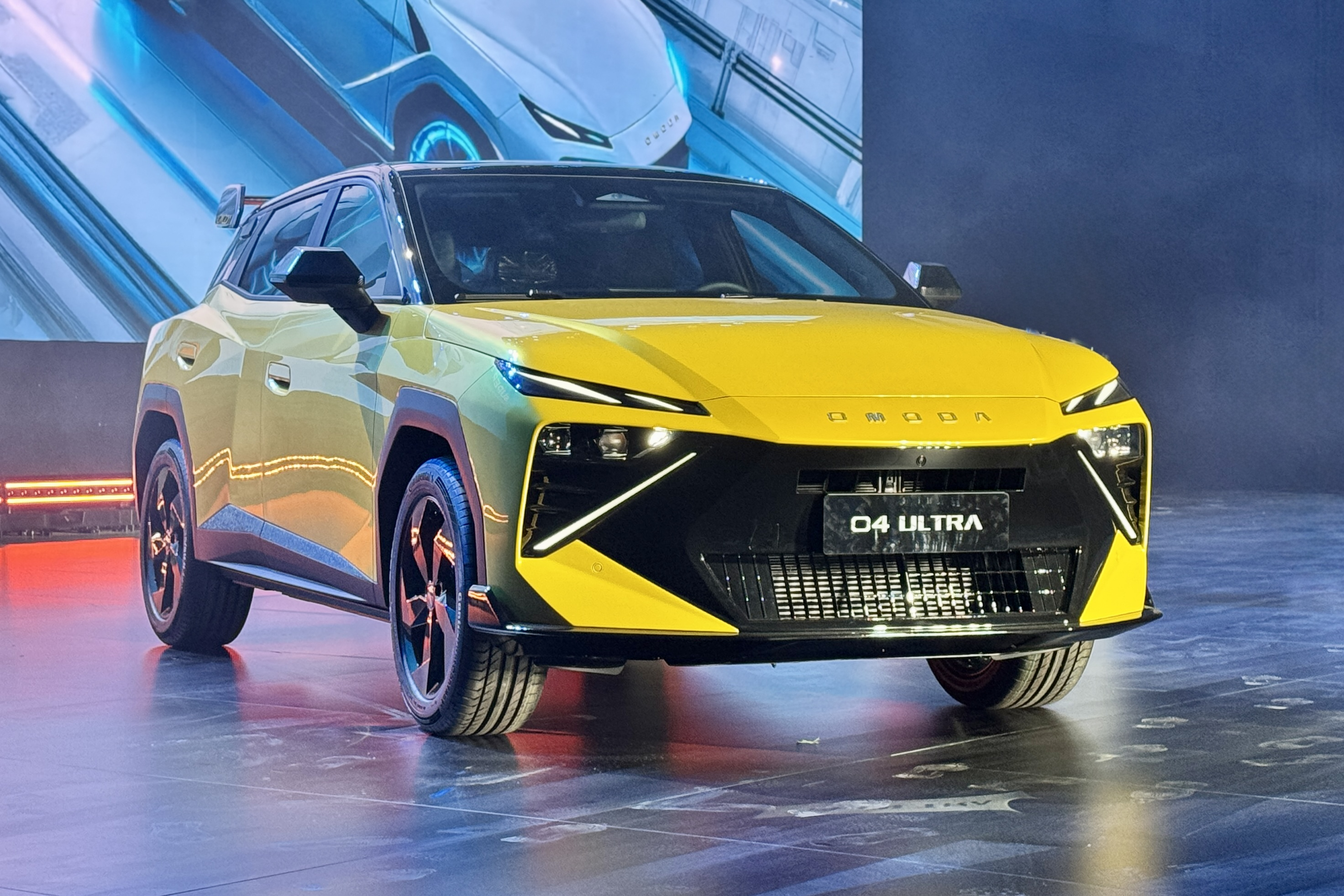
Omoda 4 Ultra

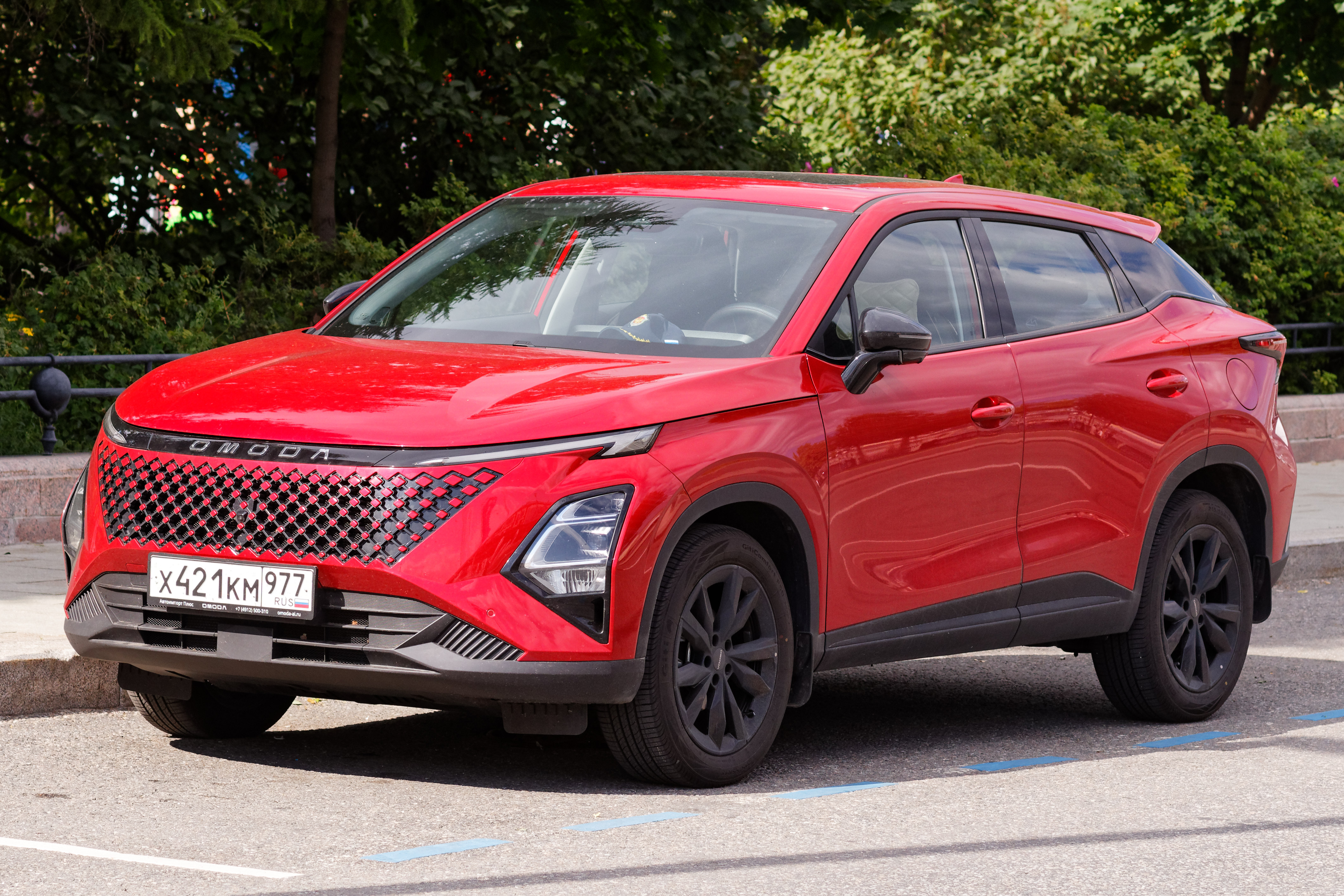
Omoda C5/5

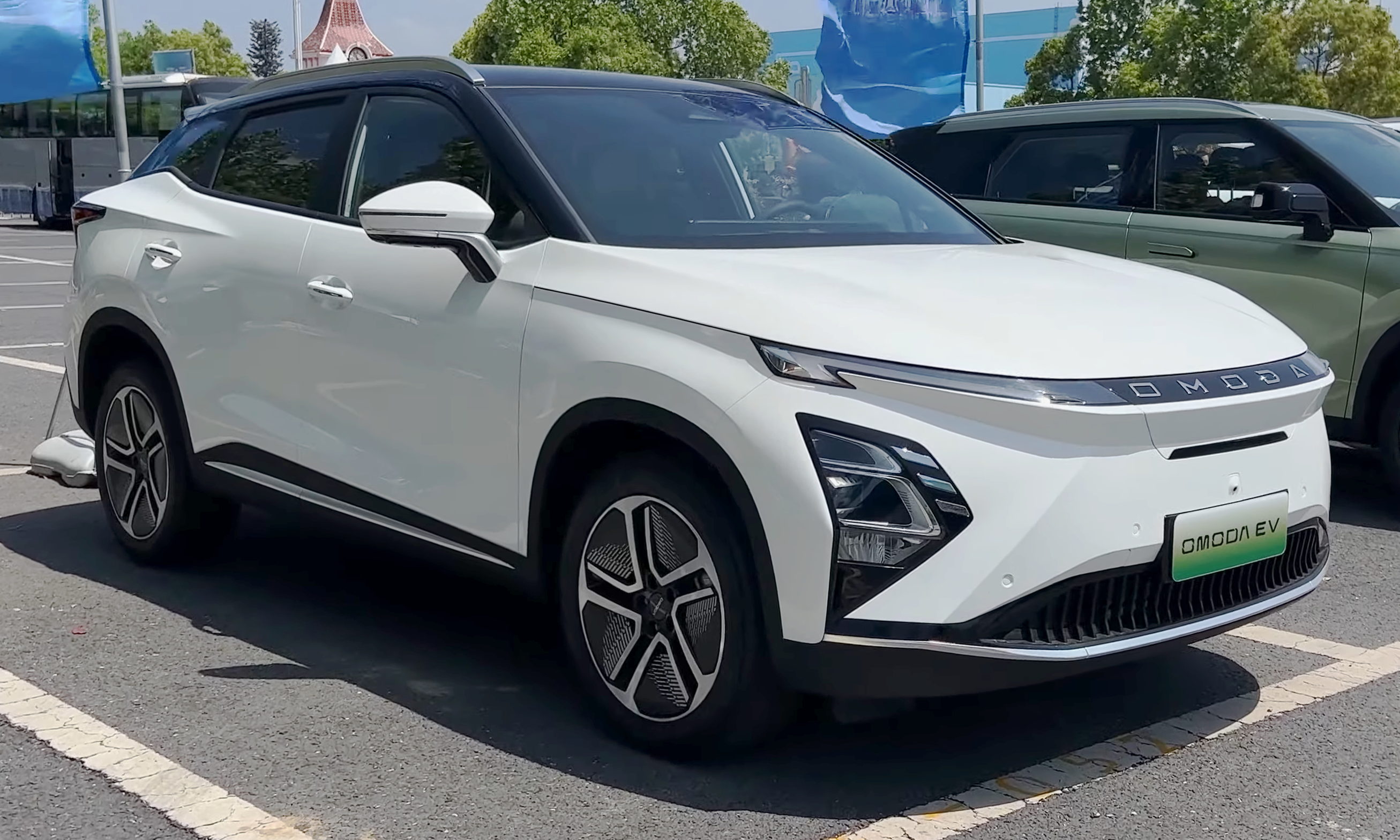
Omoda E5

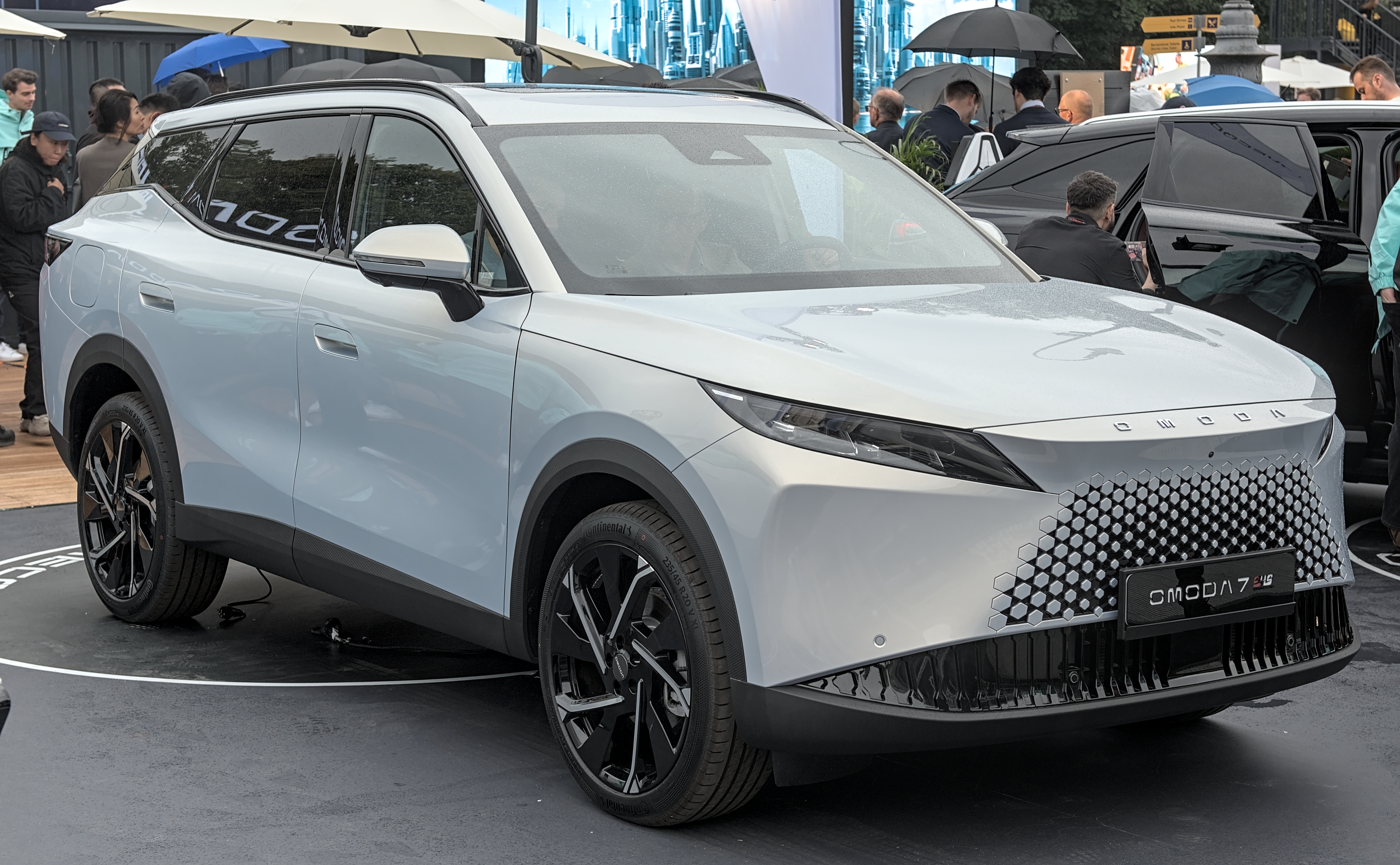
Omoda C7/7

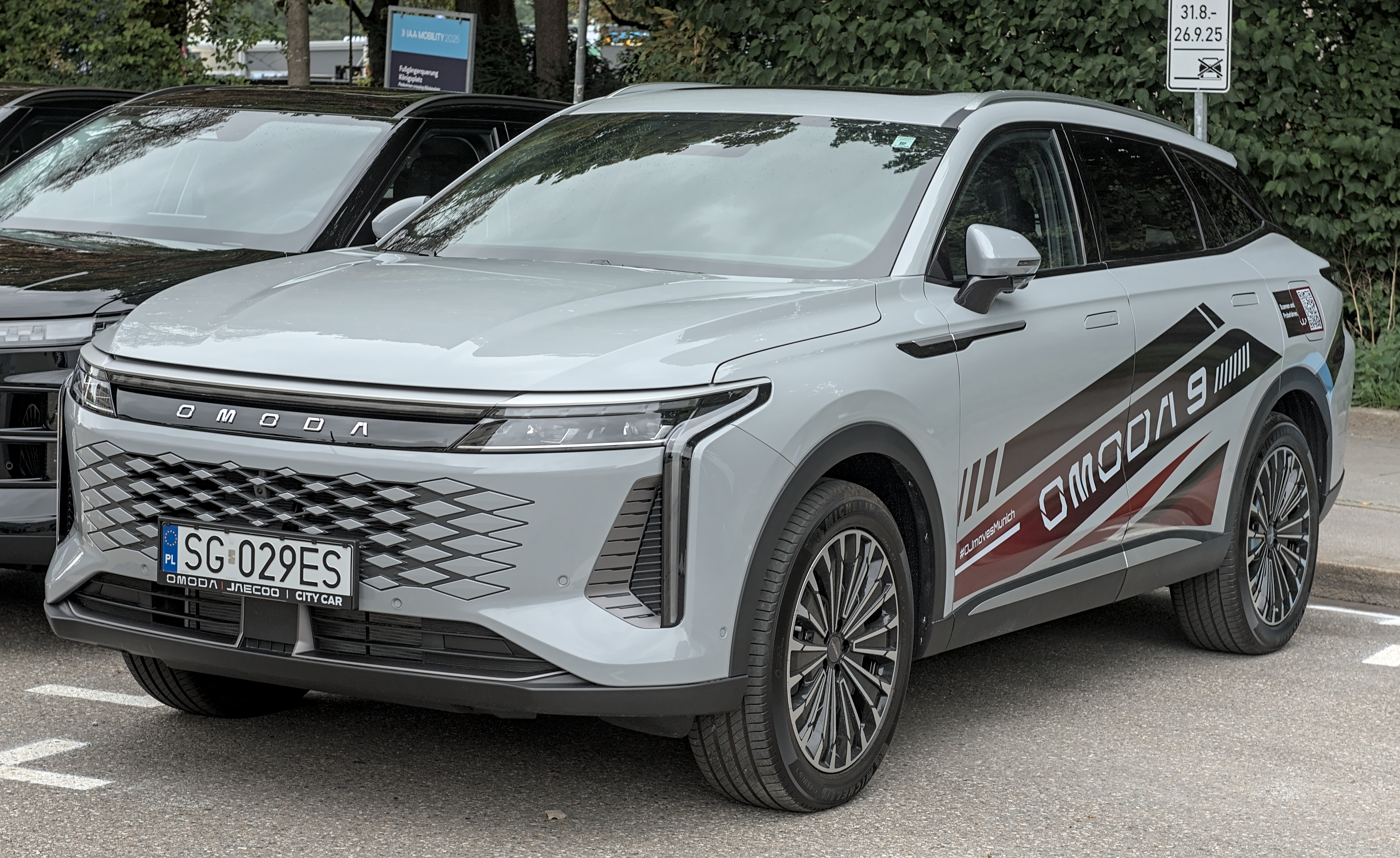
Omoda C9/9

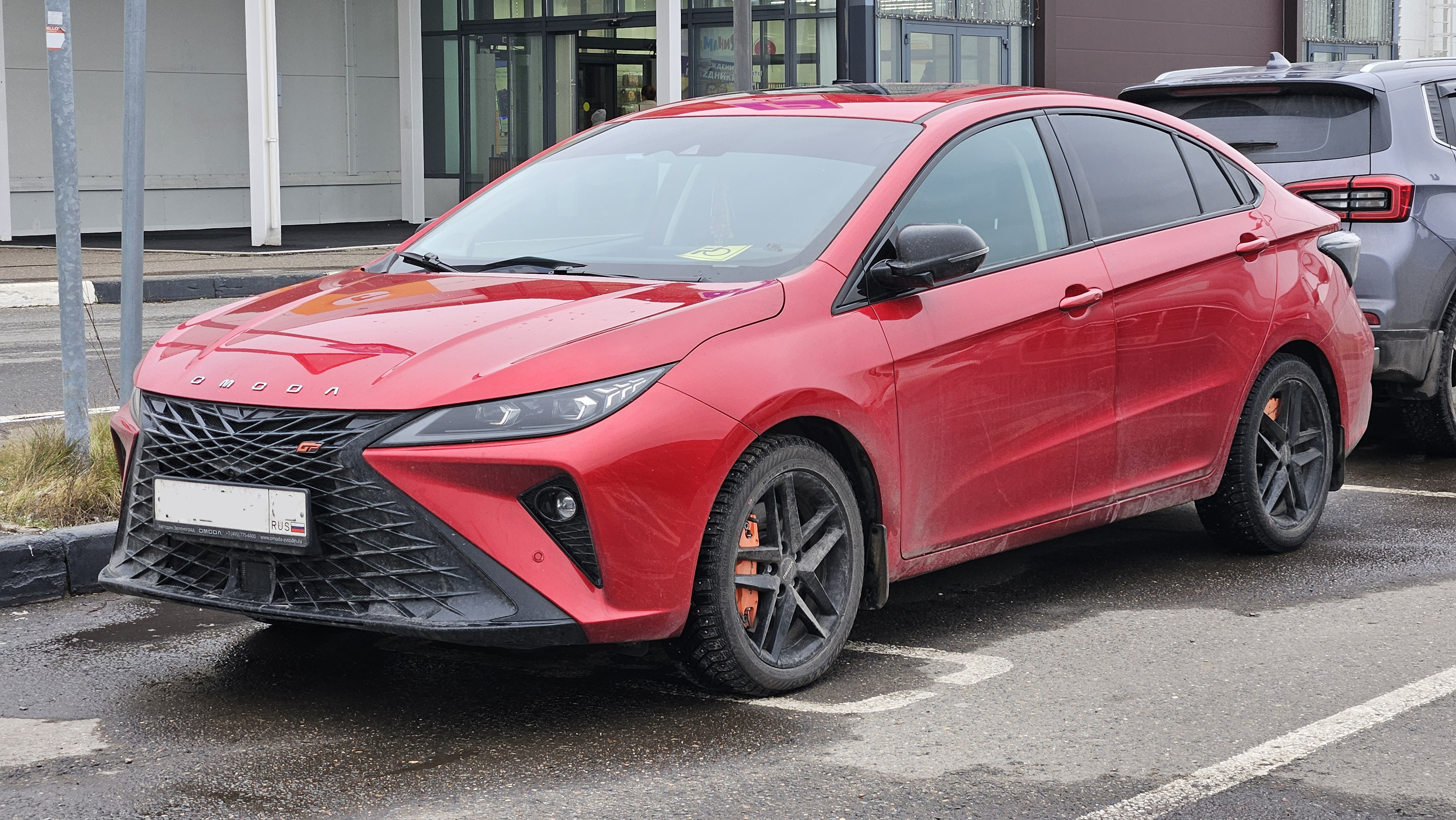
Omoda S5/O5 GT

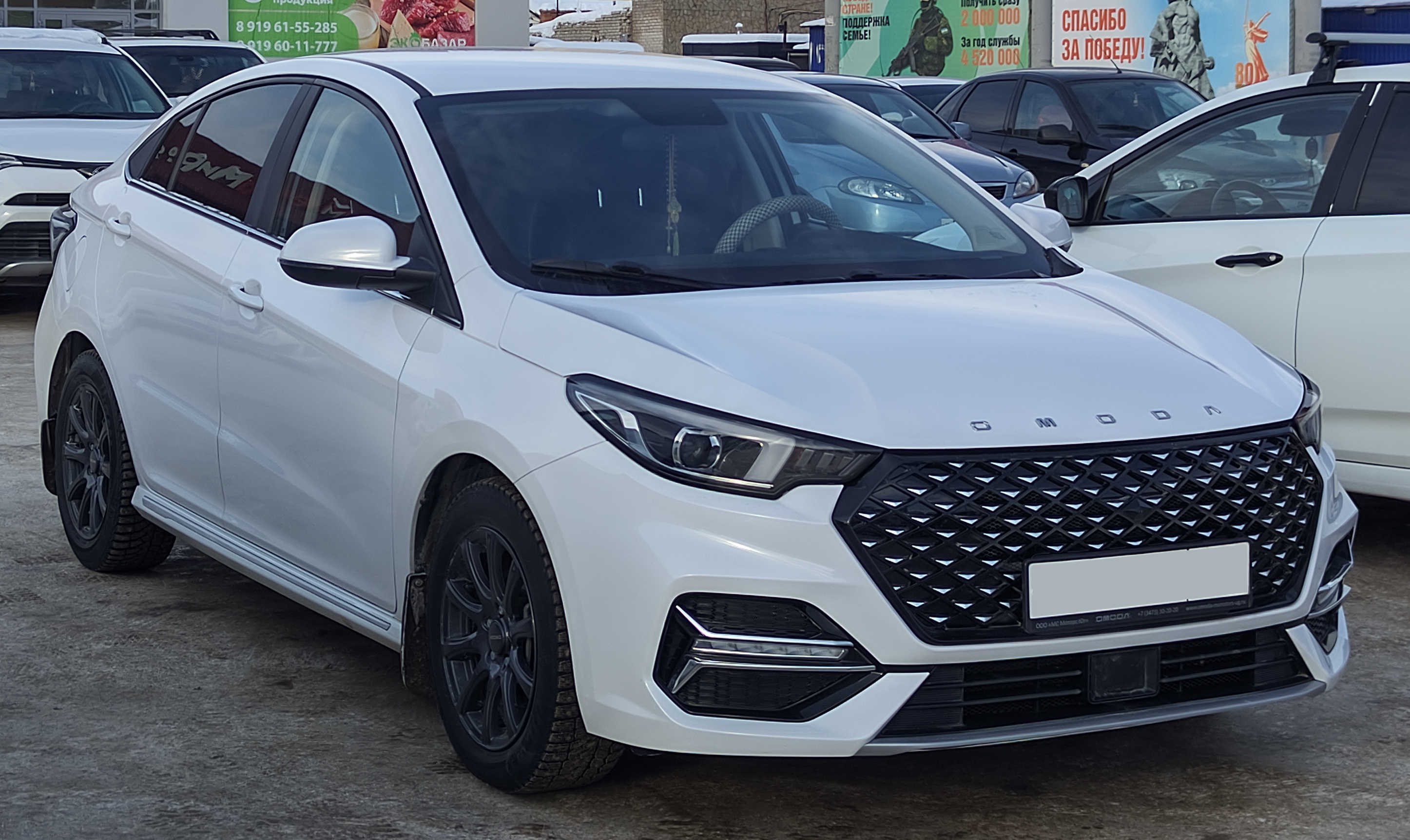
Omoda S5/O5

== See also ==
- Jaecoo
- Lepas
- Jetour
- Exeed
- Luxeed
- Exlantix
- iCar
- Karry
