= Omoda C5 =

Compact crossover SUV

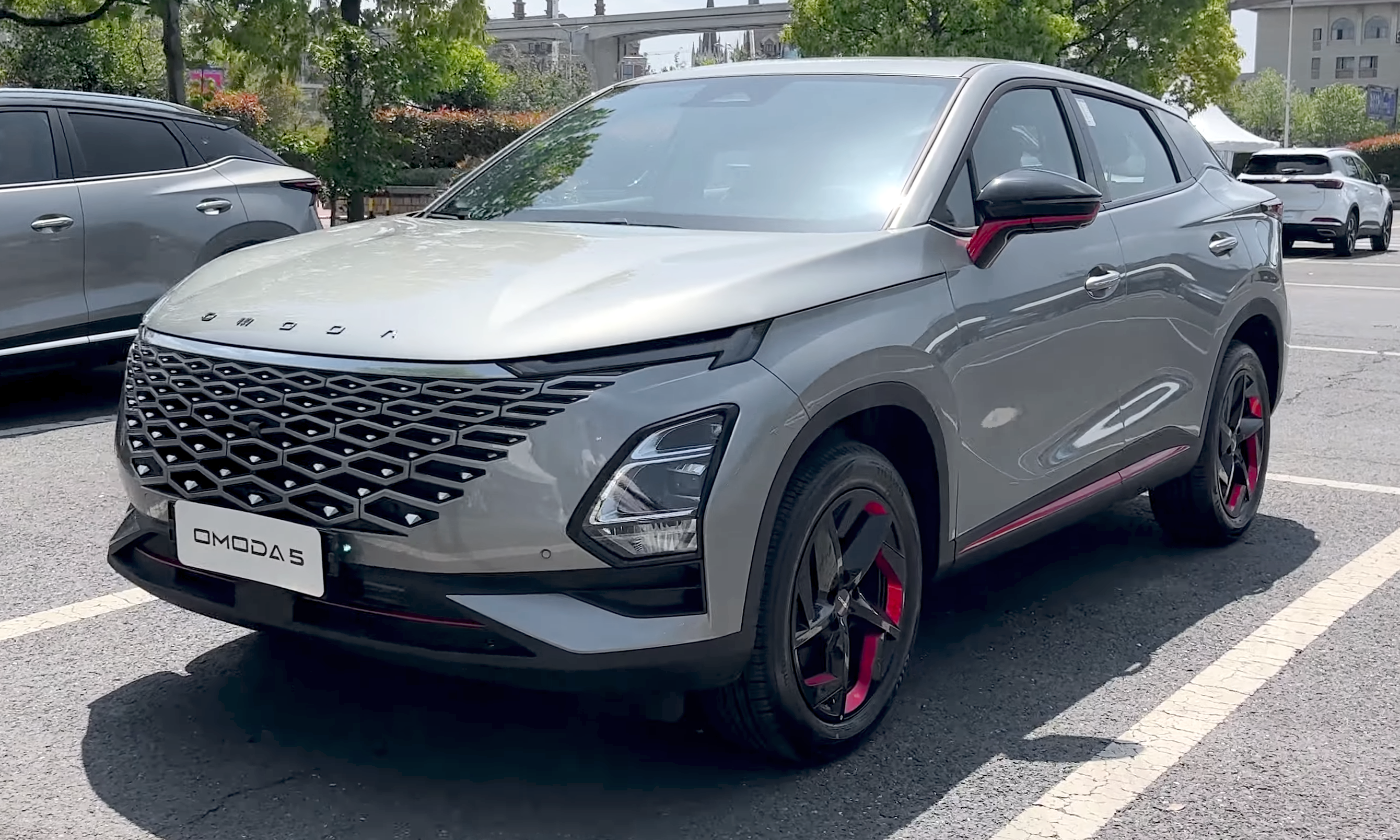

Overview
- Manufacturer: Omoda (Chery)
- Model code: T34
- Also called: Omoda 5; Omoda E5 / C5 EV (electric); Chery Omoda 5; Chirey Omoda 5 (Mexico) (Note: December 2022 – April 2023, before being renamed the Omoda C5); Chery C5 (Australia, Indonesia) (Note: since May 2025); Chery O5 (Malaysia) (Note: since September 2025); Chery E5 (Australia, Indonesia, electric) (Note: since May 2025); Chery FX (Note: Serbia, Montenegro, Bosnia and Herzegovina, North Macedonia and Israel); Chery Tiggo 5x High Energy (China, 2025–present); Chery Tiggo 5 Sport (China, 2026–present); Fownix FX (Iran); Jeland C5 (Russia)
- Production: February 2022 – present
- Assembly: China: Wuhu, Anhui; Indonesia: Bekasi, West Java (HIM, petrol and electric); Malaysia: Kulim, Kedah (Inokom, petrol and electric); Iran: Bam, Kerman (MVM, petrol); Thailand: Rayong
- Designer: Gao Xinhua

Body and chassis
- Class: Compact crossover SUV (C)
- Body style: 5-door SUV
- Layout: Front-engine, front-wheel-drive; Front-engine, all-wheel-drive; Front-motor, front-wheel-drive (EV)
- Platform: T1X
- Related: Chery Tiggo 5x; Chery Tiggo 7; Exeed LX; Jaecoo J5; Jaecoo J7; Omoda 4; Omoda C7

Powertrain
- Engine: Petrol: 1.5 L I4; 1.5 L SQRE4T15C turbo I4; 1.6 L SQRF4J16 turbo I4; Petrol hybrid: 1.5 L turbo I4 (SHS-H/CSH)
- Electric motor: Permanent magnet synchronous reluctance motor (EV)
- Transmission: CVT; 6-speed dual-clutch; 7-speed dual-clutch; DHT (SHS-H/CSH)
- Hybrid drivetrain: Series-parallel hybrid (SHS-H/CSH)
- Battery: 1.83 kWh (SHS-H/CSH); 50.6 kWh CATL LFP (EV, 2026–present; Thailand); 58.9 kWh CATL LFP (EV, 2025–present); 60.93 kWh CATL LFP (EV, 2026–present; Thailand); 61.06 kWh FinDreams LFP (EV, 2024–2025)

Dimensions
- Wheelbase: 2,610–2,630 mm (102.8–103.5 in)
- Length: 4,351–4,447 mm (171.3–175.1 in)
- Width: 1,830 mm (72.0 in)
- Height: 1,588–1,622 mm (62.5–63.9 in)
- Curb weight: 1,381–1,610 kg (3,045–3,549 lb); 1,710 kg (3,770 lb) (EV)

The Omoda C5 (also known as Omoda 5) is a compact crossover SUV produced by Chery and marketed under its upmarket brand Omoda since 2022.

In China and several other markets, it was marketed as the Chery Omoda 5 (Chinese: 奇瑞欧萌达; pinyin: Qíruì Ōuméngdá). The Omoda 5 is the first product of the Omoda product series under the Chery brand. Since late 2024, Chery renamed the vehicle to Chery Tiggo 5x High Energy (Chinese: 奇瑞瑞虎5x高能; pinyin: Qíruì Ruìhǔ 5x Gāonéng) for the Chinese market, with cosmetic exterior changes. Other names used include the Chery FX, and Fownix FX in Iran.

According to Chery, the letter "O" from Omoda represents "brand new", while "Moda" means a fashion trend. In some Western markets, the "O" was described as derived from the word "oxygen", while "Moda" means "modern".

== Overview ==
The Omoda 5 was unveiled during the Auto Guangzhou 2021 in November. Production started in February 2022, with scheduled launch on various overseas markets. It went on sale in China in the second quarter of 2022.

During its development, the Omoda 5 was known under the codename "X-C". It is the first crossover SUV model of the "Chery 4.0" products that features Chery's newly developed "Art in Motion" design language. The front end consists of a "diamond matrix" front grille. The rear section consists of a slanted rear roofline similar to fastbacks and a double-layered spoiler. Chery claimed that the vehicle is designed with "golden ratio of Pythagoras", with the height-width ratio of Omoda equal to 0.8677.

As a global model, the vehicle is simultaneously developed in left- and right-hand drive formats. Chery claimed that it has been tested around Australia, with major loop tests in the central, eastern and southern regions of Australia, for a total route of nearly 30,000 km (18,600 mi).

The interior of the Omoda 5 is equipped with two integrated 10.25-inch (260 mm) high-definition digital screens that offer control of driving, climate and entertainment settings. Vehicles destined for export markets are equipped with a different interior design, from the dashboard, central console, and door trims, which was styled by Chery's Lead Designer Richard Koo. With the rear seats in the upright position, the luggage capacity is rated at 378 litres (13.3 cu ft), and 1,075 litres (38.0 cu ft) with the rear seats folded.

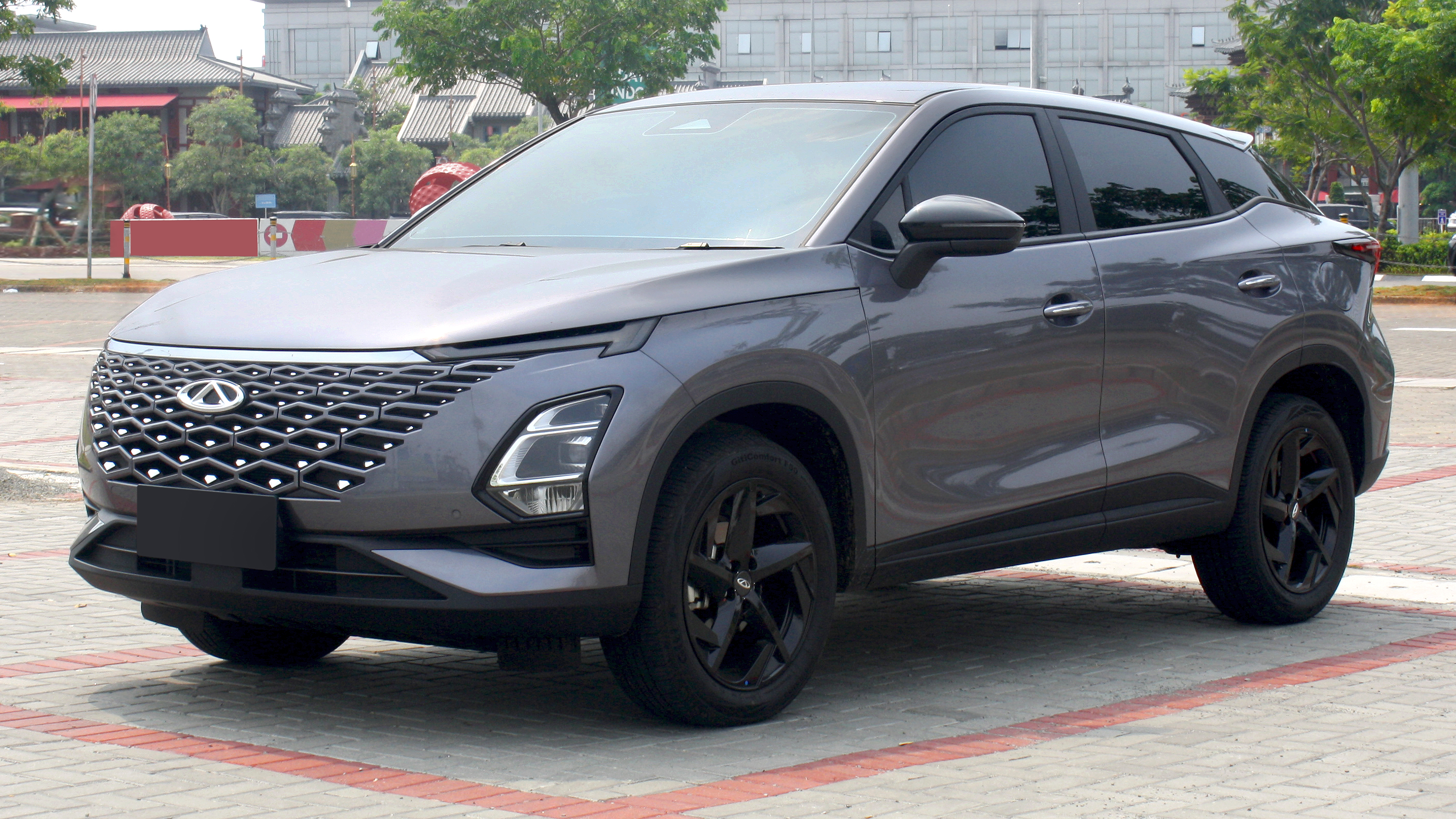
2023 Chery Omoda 5

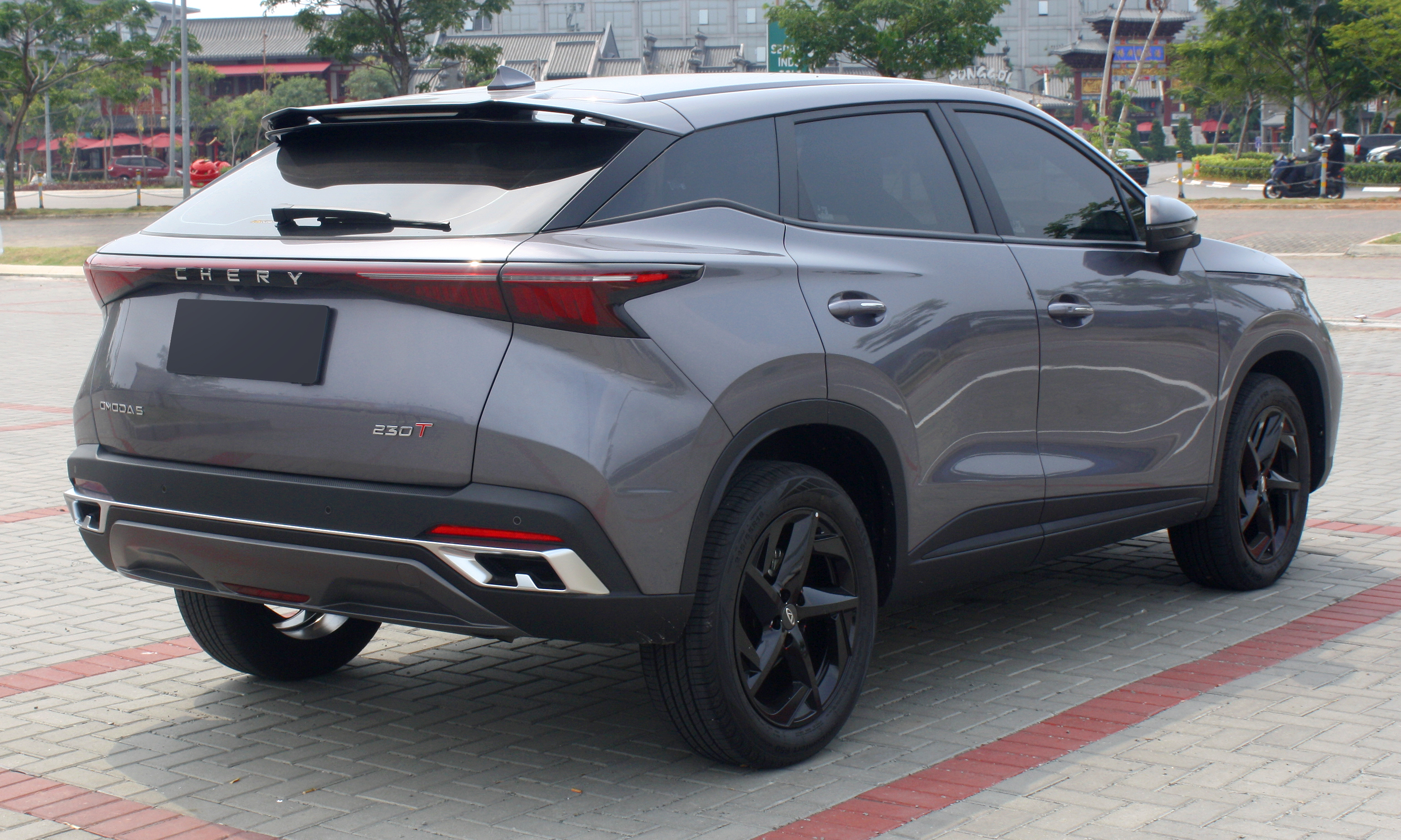
Rear view

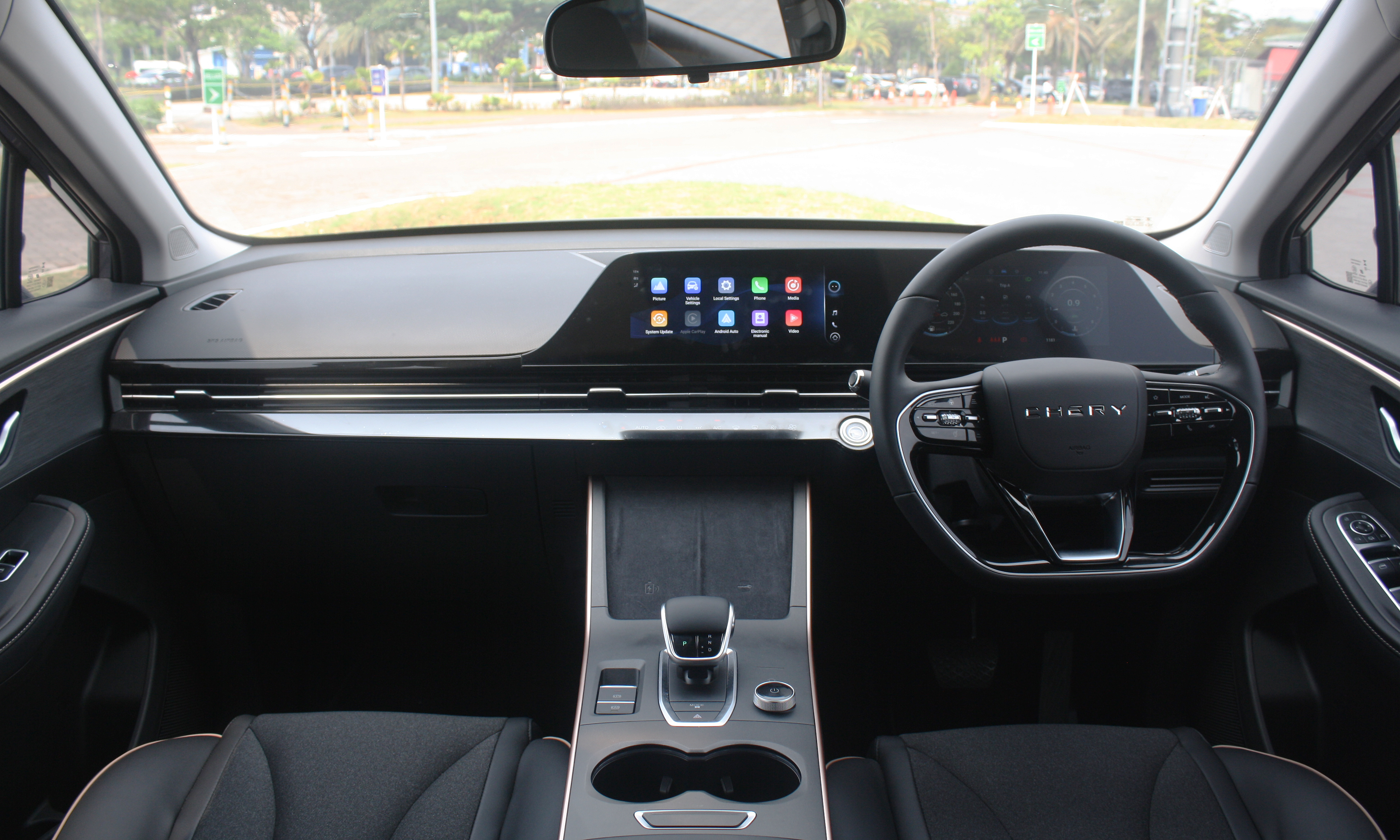
Interior (export version)

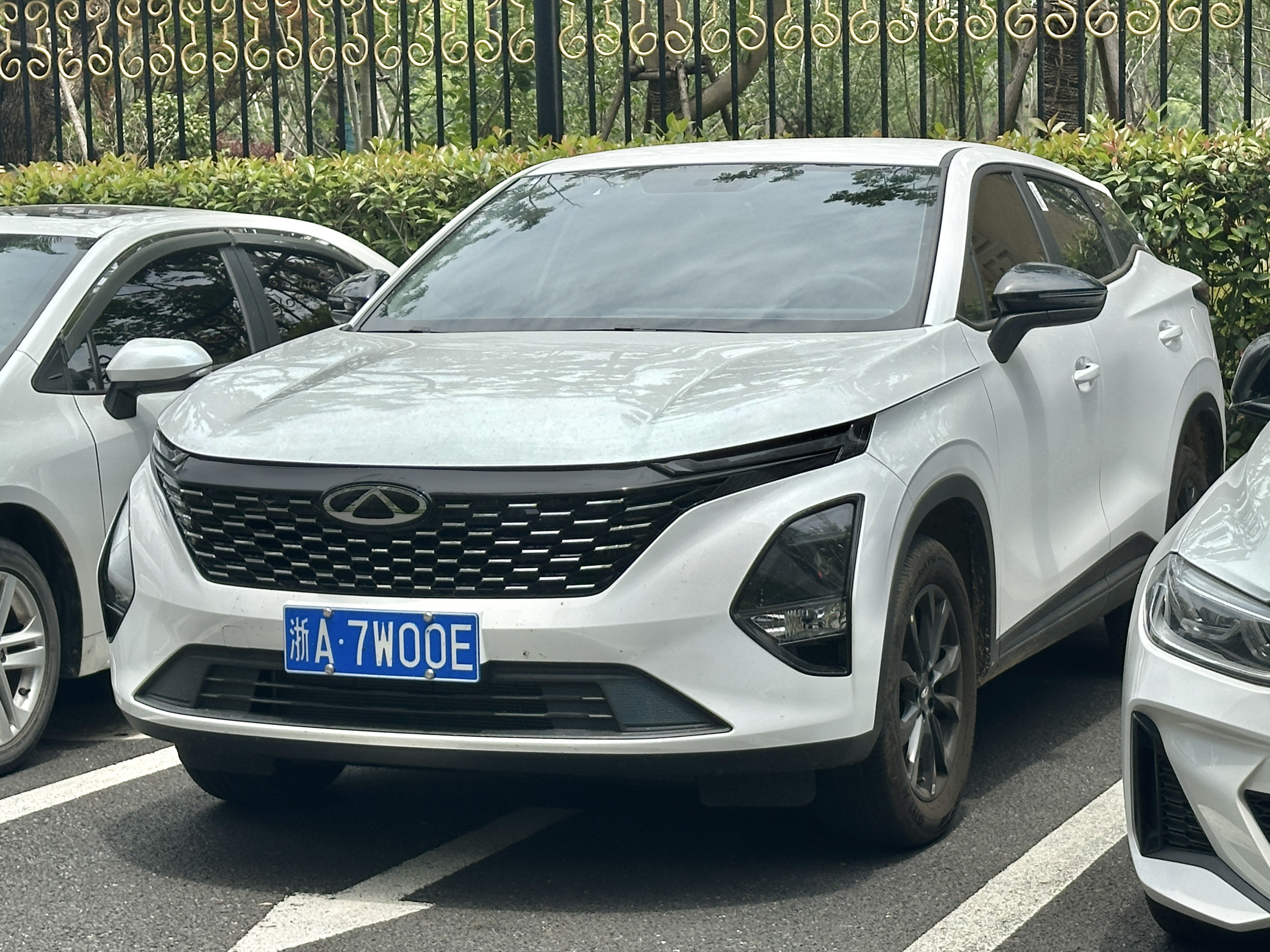
Chery Tiggo 5x High Energy (China, 2025–present)

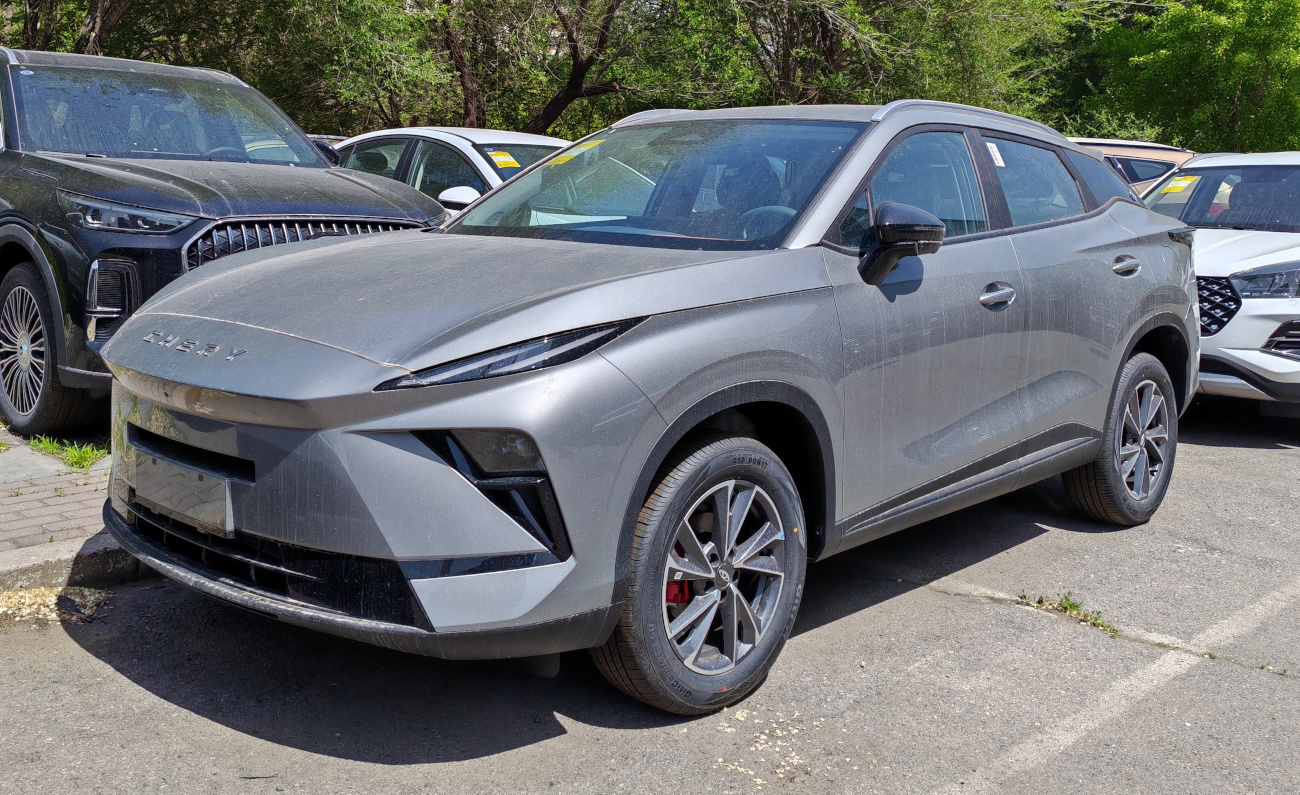
Chery Tiggo 5 Sport (China, 2026–present)

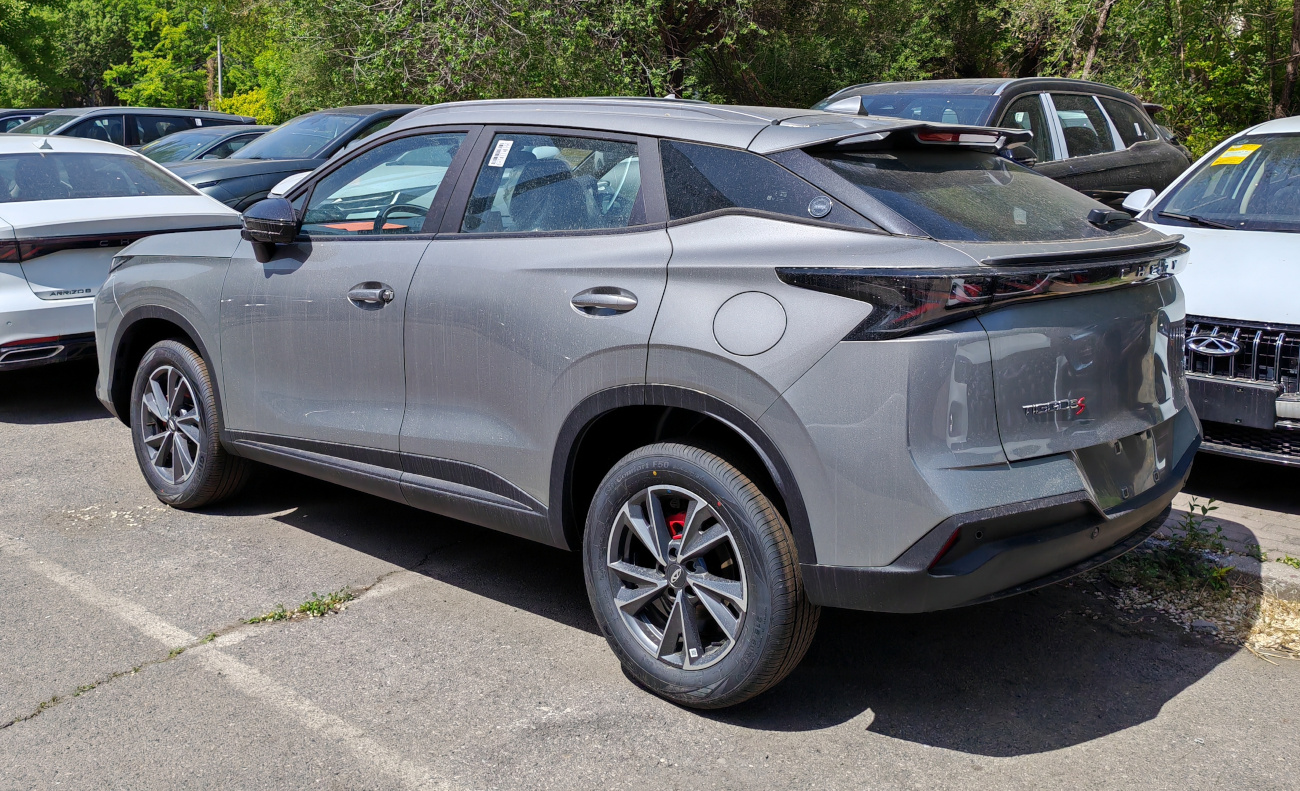
Rear view

=== Facelift ===
==== 2025 facelift ====
A first facelift for the Omoda 5 for overseas markets was first unveiled in September 2024 in Russia. In some Southeast Asian markets, the updated Omoda 5 still retains the Chery name. The changes includes an updated front fascia with body coloured elements on replacing the chrome pieces on the grille and a revised bumper, new alloy wheel designs, the omission of red highlight exterior trim pieces, and the petrol model features the black bar with the Omoda badge on front fascia and rear which replacing the Chery letter and logo. The rear fascia and the interior remain unchanged from the pre-facelift model.

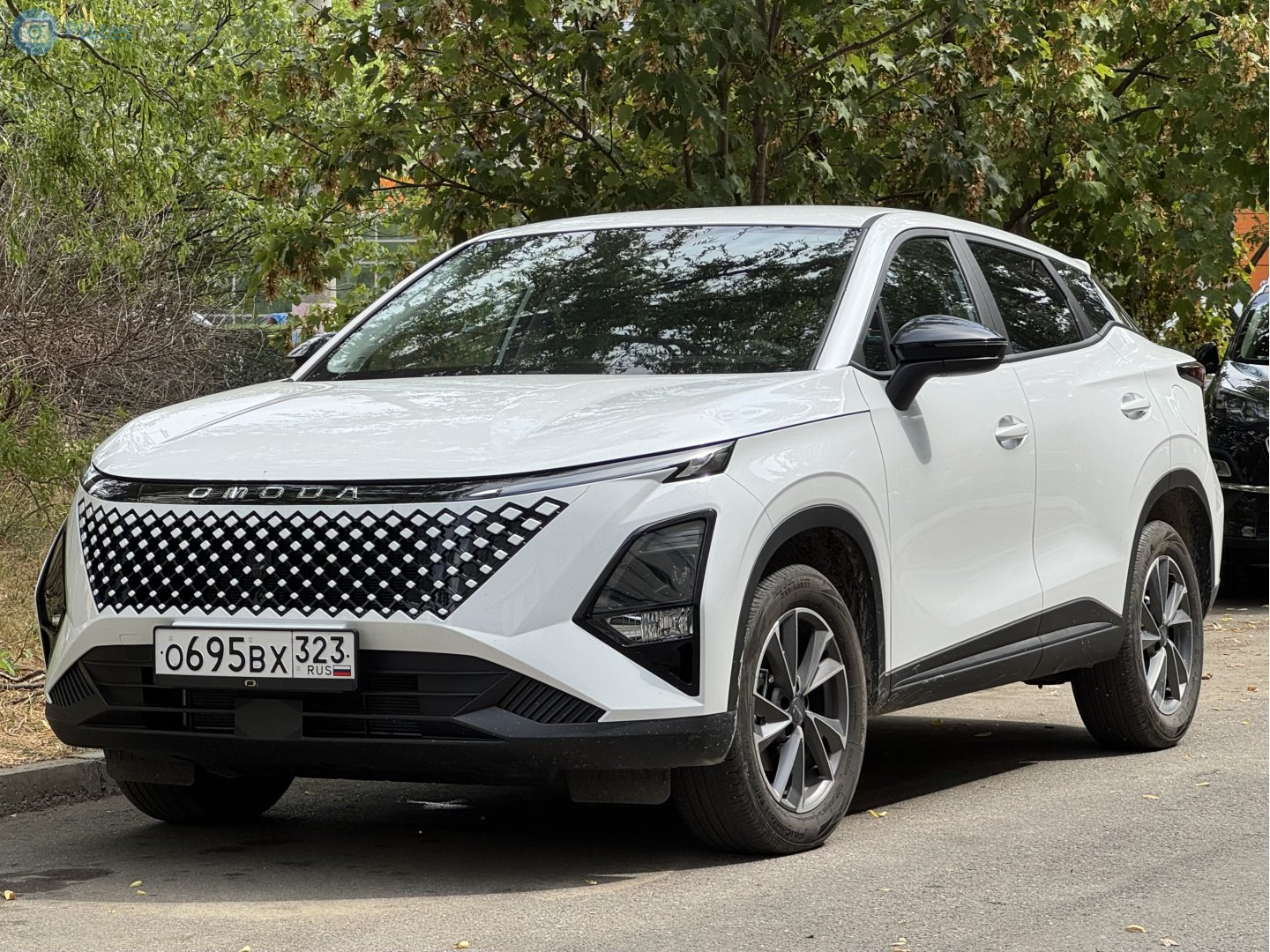
2025 facelift

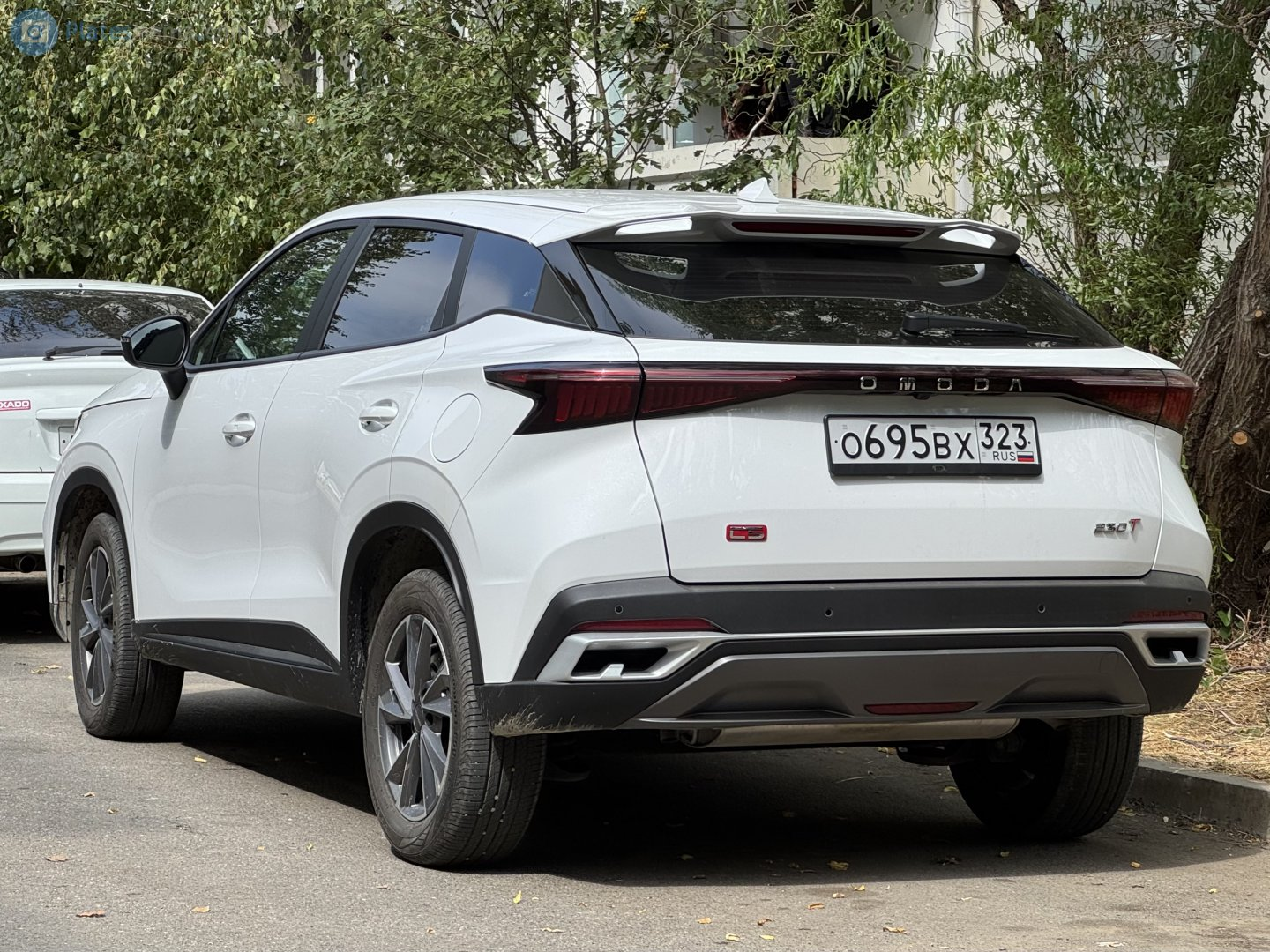
Rear view

==== 2026 facelift ====
A second facelift for the Omoda 5 for overseas markets was unveiled in October 2025.

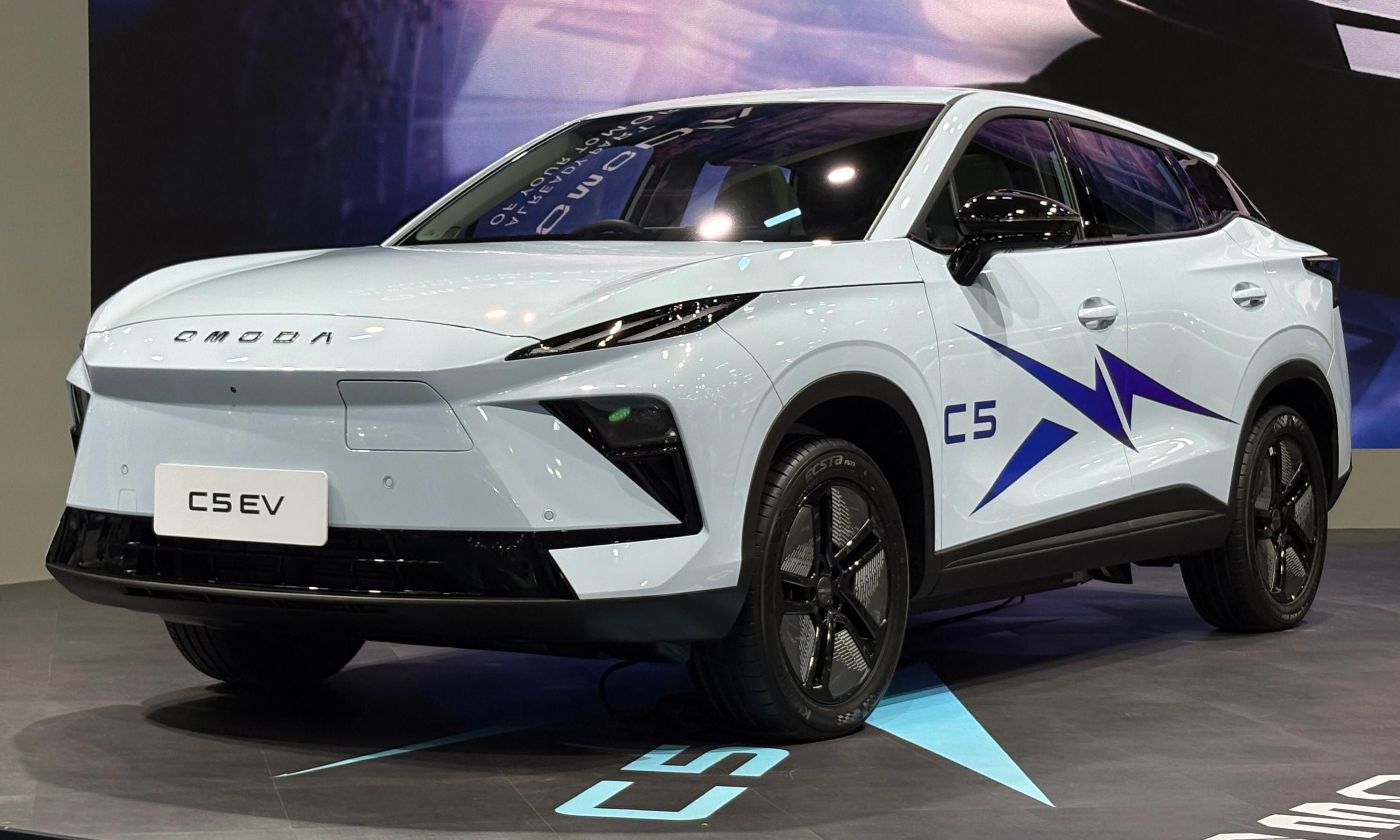
2026 facelift (EV)

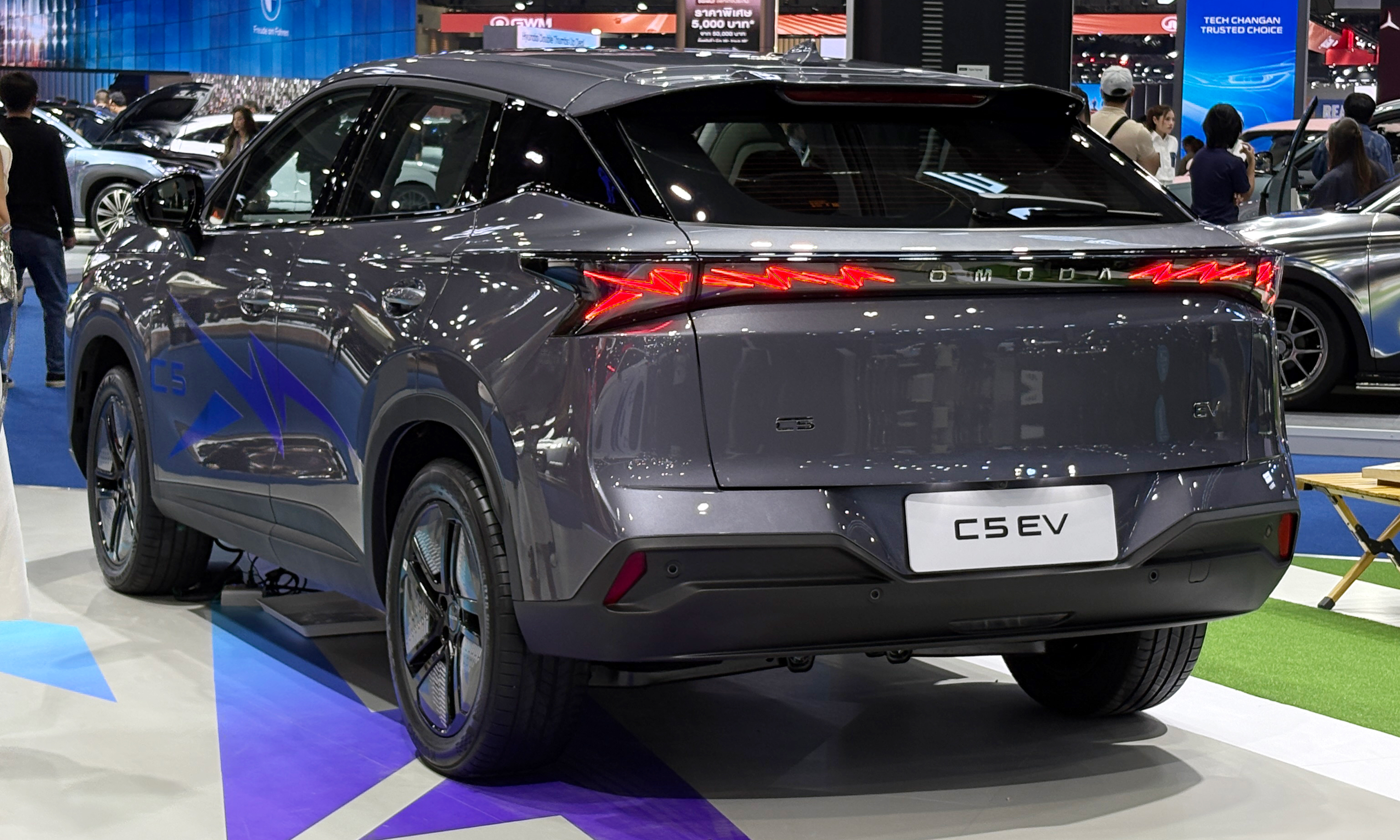
Rear view

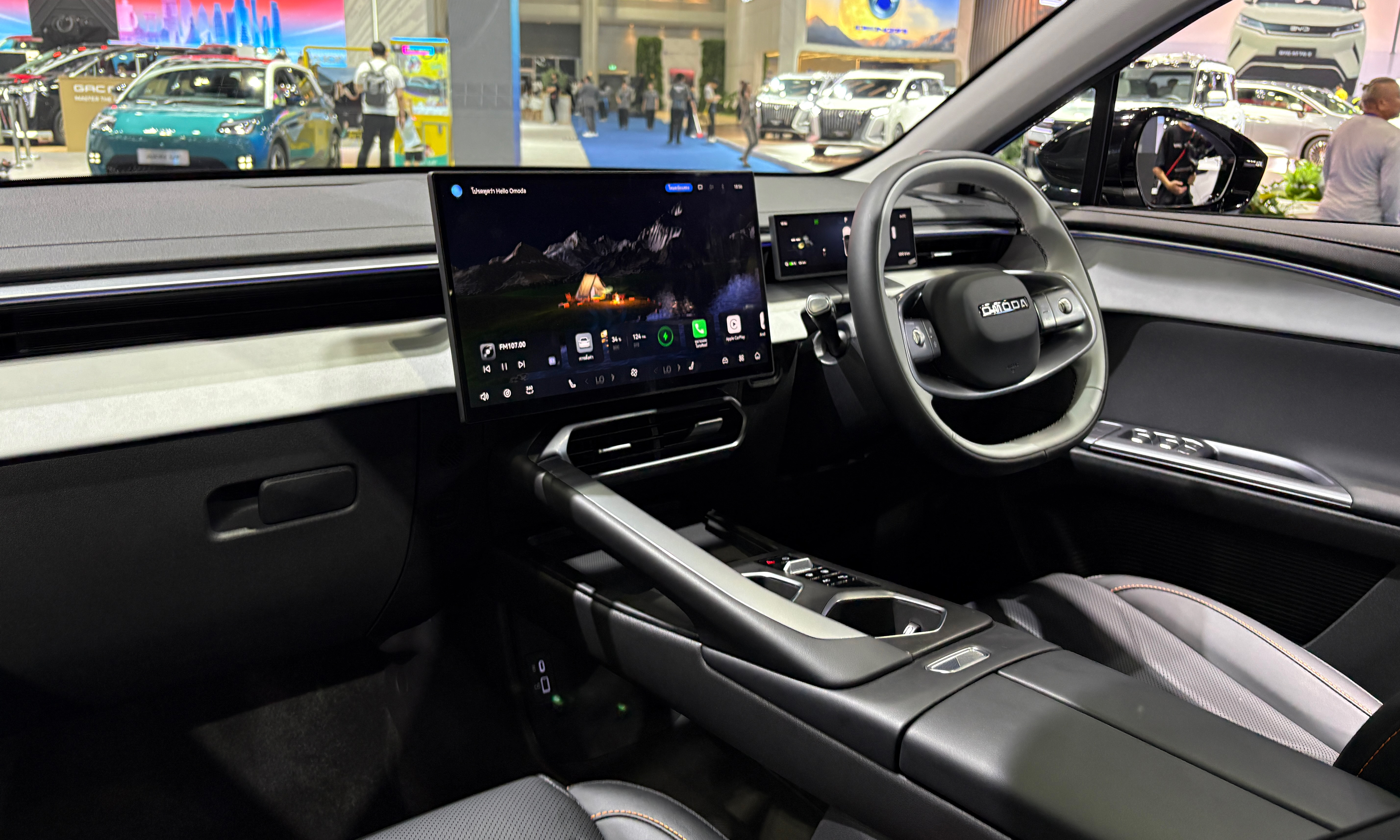
Interior

== Powertrain ==
The Omoda 5 was launched in China with a SQRF4J16 1.6-litre ACTECO TGDI (turbocharged engine with direct fuel injection) engine (marketed as "Kunpeng Power" in China). The engine is rated at 147 kW (200 PS; 197 hp) and 290 N⋅m (214 lb⋅ft) of torque, which is badged as the "290T". The 290T model is mated to a 7-speed dual-clutch transmission. Another option is the SQRE4T15C 1.5-litre turbocharged engine badged as "230T", which is rated at 108–115 kW (147–156 PS; 145–154 hp), depending on the market, with 230 N⋅m (170 lb⋅ft) of torque, and mated to a continuously variable transmission (CVT).

For some markets, the 1.6-litre model is available with optional all-wheel drive that uses multi-link rear suspension instead of a torsion beam suspension, which led to a decrease in ground clearance from 190 mm (7.5 in) to 180 mm (7.1 in).

Type	Model	Displacement	Power	Torque	Transmission	Layout	Calendar years
1.5 petrol	1.5	1,498 cc (1.5 L) I4	82 kW (111 PS; 110 hp) @ 6,150 rpm	138 N⋅m (102 lb⋅ft) @ 4,000 rpm	CVT	FWD	2025–present
1.5 petrol turbo	1.5 SQRE4T15C 230T	1,498 cc (1.5 L) turbocharged I4	108 kW (147 PS; 145 hp) @ 5,500 rpm	210–230 N⋅m (155–170 lb⋅ft) @ 1,750–4,000 rpm	CVT	FWD	2022–present
1.5 petrol turbo	1.5 SQRE4T15C 230T	1,498 cc (1.5 L) turbocharged I4	115 kW (156 PS; 154 hp) @ 5,500 rpm	210–230 N⋅m (155–170 lb⋅ft) @ 1,750–4,000 rpm	CVT	FWD	2022–present
1.6 petrol turbo	1.6 SQRF4J16 290T	1,598 cc (1.6 L) turbocharged I4	110 kW (150 PS; 148 hp) @ 5,500 rpm (Russia)	275 N⋅m (203 lb⋅ft) @ 2,000–3,800 rpm	7-speed dual-clutch	FWD; AWD	2022–present
1.6 petrol turbo	1.6 SQRF4J16 290T	1,598 cc (1.6 L) turbocharged I4	136.5 kW (186 PS; 183 hp) @ 5,500 rpm	275 N⋅m (203 lb⋅ft) @ 2,000–3,800 rpm	7-speed dual-clutch	FWD; AWD	2022–present
1.6 petrol turbo	1.6 SQRF4J16 290T	1,598 cc (1.6 L) turbocharged I4	145 kW (197 PS; 194 hp) @ 5,500 rpm	290 N⋅m (214 lb⋅ft) @ 2,000–4,000 rpm	7-speed dual-clutch	FWD; AWD	2022–present

== Electric version ==
A battery electric version with a power output of 150 kW (204 PS; 201 hp) and a 61 kWh battery was introduced at the Auto Shanghai in April 2023. Named the Chery Omoda E5 or Omoda E5 or Omoda C5 EV depending on the market, the variant adopts a different front end styling along with other design changes. It first went on sale in Indonesia in February 2024 as the Omoda E5.

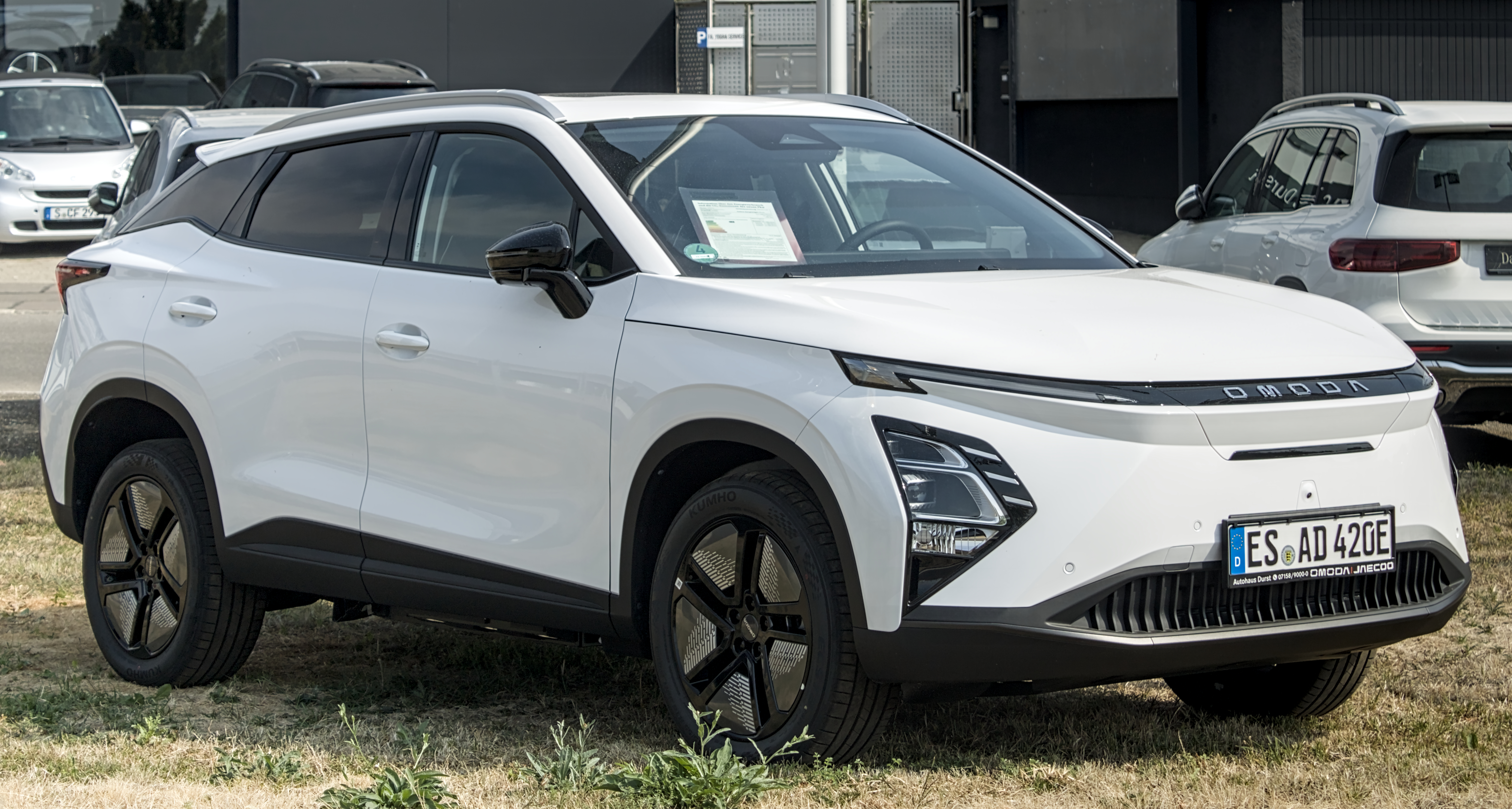
2026 Omoda 5 EV

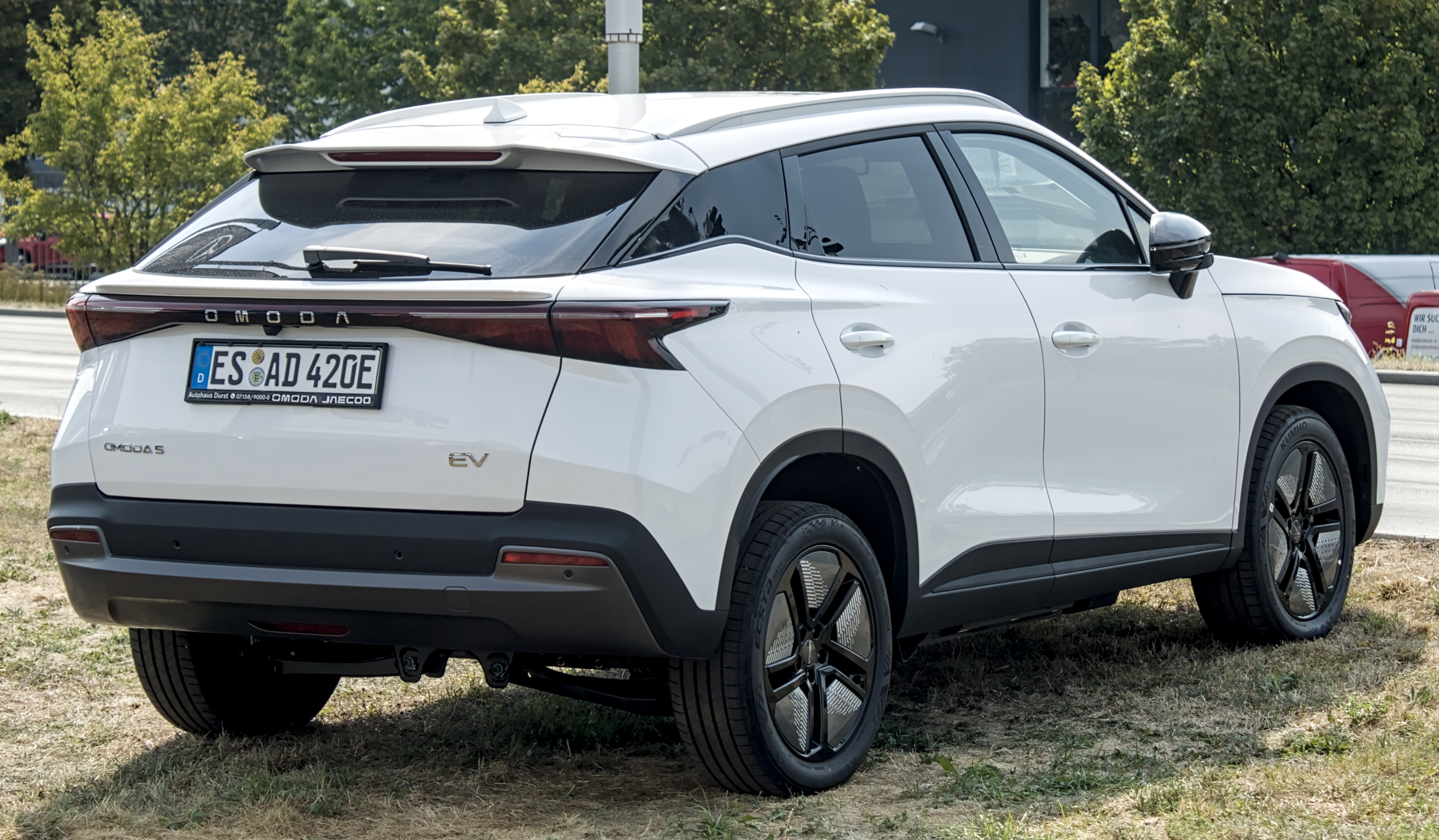
Rear view

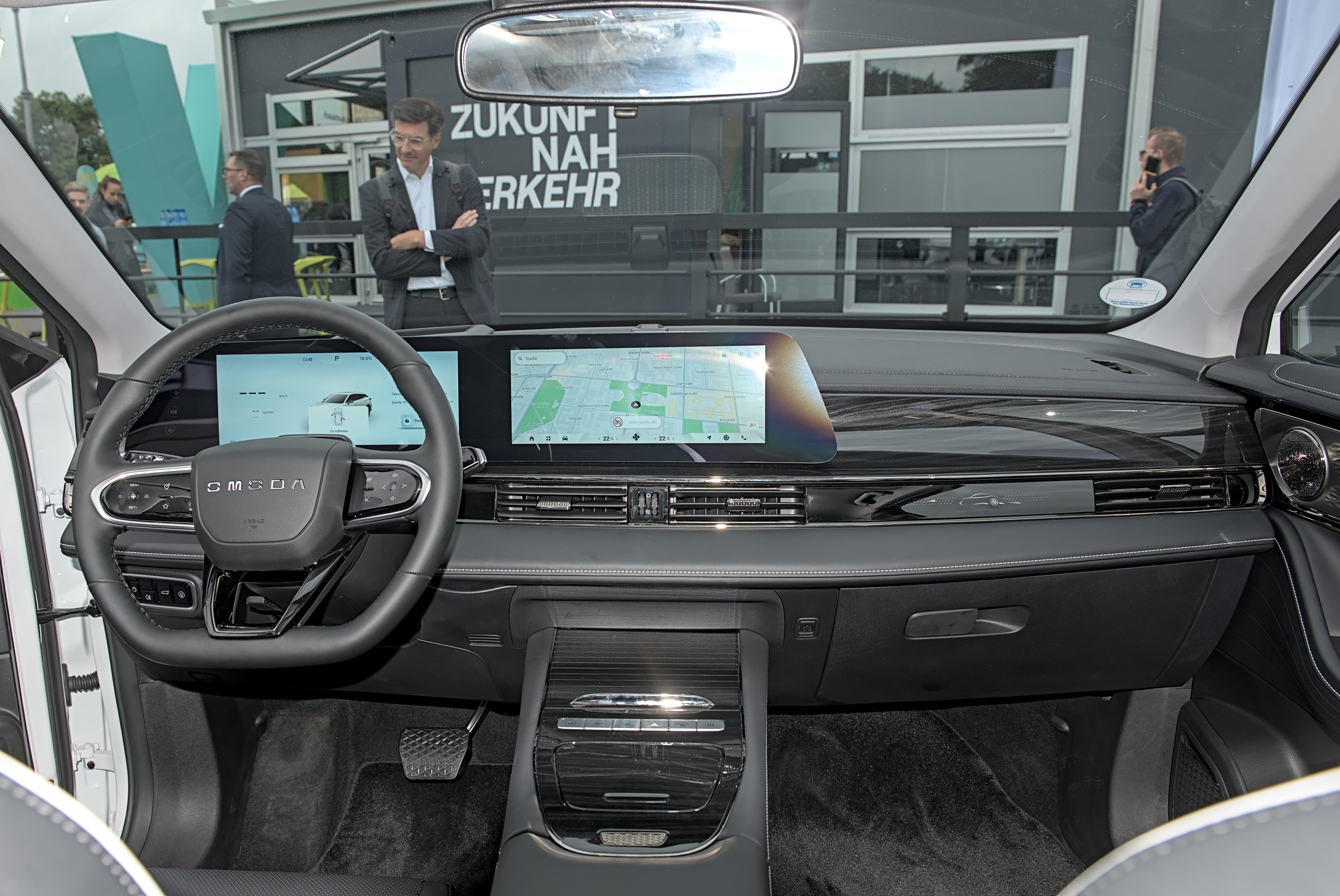
Interior

=== Powertrain ===
Battery	Layout	Electric motor	Power	Torque	0–100 km/h (0–62 mph) (claimed)	Range (claimed)		Calendar years
Battery	Layout	Electric motor	Power	Torque	0–100 km/h (0–62 mph) (claimed)	NEDC	WLTP	Calendar years
50.6 kWh (CATL Prismatic cells) LFP	FWD	Permanent magnet synchronous motor	155 kW (211 PS; 208 hp)	288 N⋅m (212 lb⋅ft)	7.2 seconds	422 km (262 mi)	N/A	2026–present (Thailand)
58.9 kWh (CATL Prismatic cells) LFP	FWD	Permanent magnet synchronous motor	155 kW (211 PS; 208 hp)	288 N⋅m (212 lb⋅ft)	7.2 seconds	505 km (314 mi)	430 km (267 mi)	2025–present
60.93 kWh (CATL Prismatic cells) LFP	FWD	Permanent magnet synchronous motor	155 kW (211 PS; 208 hp)	288 N⋅m (212 lb⋅ft)	7.2 seconds	505 km (314 mi)	430 km (267 mi)	2026–present (Thailand)
61.06 kWh (BYD blade cells) LFP	FWD	Permanent magnet synchronous motor	150 kW (204 PS; 201 hp)	340 N⋅m (251 lb⋅ft)	7.2 seconds	505 km (314 mi)	430 km (267 mi)	2024–2025

== Markets ==
=== Oceania ===
==== Australia ====
The Omoda 5 was introduced in Australia in March 2023, as Chery's first model in the market after a 7-year absence. Imported from China, initial models are powered by the 1.5-litre turbocharged petrol engine and front-wheel-drive, it is available in two trim levels: BX and EX. The GT trim was added in March 2024, it is powered by a 1.6-litre turbocharged petrol engine with an AWD option. The base FX trim was added in July 2024. In September 2024, the Omoda E5 battery electric version was launched in Australia, with two trim levels: BX and EX. The GT models were shortly discontinued in December 2024, after less than 12 months on sale.

The facelift model for the internal combustion version debuted on 19 May 2025, with two trim levels: Urban and Ultimate. The facelift model was renamed to Chery C5 (petrol) and Chery E5 (electric) in May 2025 for the Australian market, as Chery was preparing to introduce the separate Omoda brand in Australia. The 2025 model year Chery E5 battery electric version debuted on 22 May 2025, with two trim levels: Urban and Ultimate. In September 2025, the 2025.5 model year E5 (electric) model was downgraded to a 58.9 kWh battery. In July 2026, the Hybrid model, powered by the 1.5-litre turbocharged petrol hybrid, was introduced in Australia for the Urban and Ultimate trims. In addition, the Ultimate petrol variant was discontinued in the same month.

==== New Zealand ====
The Omoda 5 was introduced in New Zealand in April 2024, under the Omoda marque as the Omoda C5 and E5. At launch, it is available in three trim levels: BX, EX and GT (only for the 1.6-litre turbocharged petrol). Three powertrain options are available for the New Zealand market.

=== Asia ===
==== Indonesia ====
The Indonesian market Omoda 5 was revealed in February 2023, and went on sale a month later. Deliveries start in May 2023. Previously showcased at the 2022 Indonesia International Motor Show where it was initially debuted along with the Tiggo 7 Pro and Tiggo 8 Pro.

Initial variants for the Omoda 5 were the Z and RZ, all powered by a 1.5-litre turbocharged petrol, with front-wheel drive and CVT. It is locally assembled at Handal Indonesia Motor's facility in Bekasi, West Java with knock-down kits imported from China.

In September 2023, the GT trim was added to the range. The GT is powered by a 1.6-litre turbocharged petrol engine with a 7-speed dual-clutch automatic, available in either front-wheel drive or all-wheel drive. It was discontinued in 2025.

The battery electric version went on sale on 5 February 2024 as the Omoda E5, making Indonesia the first market to receive the electric version. Local production started in December 2023. Initially available with a white-blue interior at launch, a black interior option was added in May 2024. An entry-level variant, dubbed the "Pure", was introduced in July 2024.

The facelift model for the internal combustion and battery electric versions was introduced on 25 June 2025 and was renamed to Chery C5 (petrol) and Chery E5 (electric). The variants of the facelift model remain unchanged from the pre-facelift model and the GT trim was discontinued. The C5 received a multi-link suspension instead of a torsion beam for the rear suspension and is paired with a 6-speed dual-clutch transmission replacing the CVT.

In February 2026, the GT AWD variant was discontinued due to low sales with less than 100 units sold during its sales period and Chery's focus shifted to introducing vehicles equipped with electrification technology. The C5 CSH (Chery Super Hybrid) model, powered by the 1.5-litre turbocharged petrol hybrid, was also introduced in the same month at the 33rd Indonesia International Motor Show.

==== Kazakhstan ====
The Omoda 5 was released in Kazakhstan in October 2022, and went on sale in June 2023 under the Omoda marque as the Omoda C5.

==== Malaysia ====
The Omoda 5 was launched alongside the Tiggo 8 Pro in Malaysia in July 2023, marking Chery's return to the Malaysian market. It is available in C and H variants powered by the 1.5-litre turbocharged petrol engine. It is locally assembled at Inokom's facility in Kulim, Kedah.

The Omoda E5 battery electric version was launched in Malaysia on 6 March 2024, was initially imported from China. In November 2024, the E5 became locally assembled alongside the petrol Omoda 5 model in Kulim, Kedah.

The facelift model for the internal combustion version was launched on 10 September 2025 and was renamed to Chery O5 (petrol). The facelift model became available in a single unnamed variant equivalent to the H variant, received a multi-link suspension instead of a torsion beam for the rear suspension and is paired with a 6-speed dual-clutch transmission replacing the CVT.

==== Nepal ====
The Omoda E5 battery electric version was launched in Nepal market in February 2024. Omoda offers a 99 kW (135 PS; 133 hp) motor variant in Nepal.

==== Philippines ====
The Omoda 5 went on sale in the Philippines on 24 November 2024 and was later launched in February 2025. In the Philippines, it is available with two variants: a petrol model (C5) and battery electric model (E5).

==== Singapore ====
The Omoda E5 battery electric version was launched in Singapore on 24 May 2024 under the Omoda marque.

==== Thailand ====
The Omoda C5 EV was released in Thailand on 6 August 2024, with two trim levels: Long Range Plus and Long Range Ultimate. In May 2025, the Plus and Ultimate trims were renamed to Dynamic and Max, respectively.

The facelift model was introduced in Thailand on 30 March 2026, it is available in the sole Max Plus variant using the 50.6 kWh battery pack. The facelift model for the Thai market is based on the export-market 2026 facelift.

In November 2026, the Ultra variant using a larger 60.9 kWh battery pack was introduced to the line-up as a locally assembled variant

==== Vietnam ====
The Omoda C5 was launched in Vietnam on 26 November 2024 with two variants: Premium and Flagship, powered by a 1.5-litre turbocharged petrol engine and imported from Indonesia.

In March 2025, the Omoda C5 gained a new variant, Luxury, which is powered by a 1.5-litre naturally aspirated petrol engine.

In March 2026, the SHS-H hybrid model, powered by the 1.5-litre turbocharged petrol hybrid, was introduced in Vietnam and it is available in two variants: Premium and Flash.

=== Europe ===
==== Hungary ====
The Omoda 5 was introduced to the Hungarian market on 10 October 2024, exclusively with the 1.6 TGDI turbocharged gasoline engine capable of delivering 145 kW (197 PS; 194 hp) of power and 290 N⋅m (214 lb⋅ft) of torque. Two versions are available: Comfort and Premium.

==== Italy ====
The Omoda 5 was introduced to the Italian market in June 2024, exclusively with the 1.6 TGDI turbocharged gasoline engine capable of delivering 145 kW (197 PS; 194 hp) of power and 290 N⋅m (214 lb⋅ft) of torque. Two versions are available: Comfort and Premium. The Omoda 5 EV was made available in Italy from the end of 2024.

==== Turkey ====
The Omoda 5 was released in Turkey in March 2023. It is available in Comfort, Luxury and Excellent trim levels powered by the 1.6-litre turbocharged petrol engine.

==== United Kingdom ====
The Omoda 5 is sold in the UK under the Omoda marque. Powertrain options are the 1.6-litre turbocharged petrol engine and a battery electric version. A 1.5-litre petrol hybrid powertrain option will be available in early 2025. UK market units have bespoke damper settings, spring rates, bush rates, and anti-roll bars tuning, as well as touchscreen controls, in order to meet European preferences.

In August 2025, the petrol Omoda 5 received a refresh. It gained a new interior design (dashboard, door trims and centre console) along with a column gear shifter shared with the Omoda E5. The entry-level spec has been renamed from 'Comfort' to 'Knight', while the higher-spec model remains 'Noble'. Noble models also receive electric seats, larger 19-inch alloy wheels and roof rails. The power output from the 1.6-litre petrol engine has been reduced from 136.5 kW (186 PS; 183 hp) to 108 kW (147 PS; 145 hp), while the full-size spare wheel was deleted to increase boot space by 15% to 430 litres. Both the Omoda 5 and Omoda E5 also received revised front suspension to address criticisms, consisting of new components, adjusted suspension geometry, a new electric power steering system and a change to the brake materials.

==== Russia ====
The Omoda 5 was released in Russia in October 2022 under the Omoda marque as the Omoda C5. It is initially available in Joy, Lifestyle and Ultimate trim levels powered by the 1.5-litre turbocharged petrol engine and front-wheel drive. The Active and Supreme trim levels powered by the 1.6-litre turbocharged petrol engine with standard all-wheel drive were available since March 2023.

=== Latin America ===
==== Brazil ====
The Omoda E5 battery electric version was launched in Brazil on 15 April 2025, alongside the Jaecoo 7 as part of Omoda-Jaecoo introduction in Brazil. It is available in the sole variant using the 61 kWh battery pack.

In October 2025, the SHS-H hybrid model, powered by the 1.5-litre turbocharged petrol hybrid, was introduced in Brazil.

The facelift model for the Omoda E5 was introduced in Brazil in August 2026, based on the export-market 2026 facelift for the Brazilian market.

==== Chile ====
The Omoda 5 is sold in Chile as Omoda C5 dropping the Chery name as both brands are being sold in the country. It is available with three trim levels: Comfort. Luxury and Prestige; the first two powered by the 1.5-litre turbocharged petrol engine and the latter powered by the 1.6-litre turbocharged petrol engine. Deliveries started in the first trimester of 2024.

==== Mexico ====
The Omoda 5 was sold in Mexico as the Chirey Omoda 5, with two trim levels available: Luxury and Premium; powered by a 1.5-litre turbocharged petrol engine. In May 2023, the model was renamed to Omoda C5, after the Omoda marque was introduced for the market.

=== South Africa ===
The Omoda 5 was revealed in South Africa in March 2023, and launched in April 2023 under the Omoda marque as the Omoda C5. It is available in Tech, Elegance, and Elegance S trim levels powered by the 1.5-litre turbocharged petrol engine. The C5 GT with a 1.6-litre turbocharged petrol engine and all-wheel drive option became available in November 2023. The Style trim was added in June 2024, followed by the addition of the entry-level Street trim in November 2024. The Lux X and Elegance X trims were introduced in April 2025, to replace the former Lux and Elegance trim levels.

In April 2026, the SHS HEV hybrid model, powered by the 1.5-litre turbocharged petrol hybrid, was introduced in South Africa as the flagship variant.

== Recall ==
In February 2024, Chery Australia issued a safety recall of 5,901 units of the Omoda 5 due to a manufacturing defect. The bolt securing the brake pipe union may not have been tightened sufficiently which could cause the brake fluid to leak and result in reduced braking performance.

In April 2024, Chery Malaysia issued a safety recall on 600 units of the Omoda 5 due to a potential rear axle beam component that may detach while driving, following a viral social media post where an Omoda 5 had its rear axle broken off whilst being driven. Chery Indonesia issued the same recall for 420 suspected units in May 2024. The issue resurfaced on 6 October 2026 in Johor Bahru, leading to another recall issued on 11 October. This recall was then extended to Australia in November 2026.

In February 2026, Omoda and Jaecoo UK issued a safety recall due to a few limited instances of an improperly locked driveshaft nut that may cause wheel vibration and abnormal noise on Omoda 5 and E5 models.

== Safety ==
=== ANCAP ===
ANCAP test results Chery Omoda 5 (2022, aligned with Euro NCAP)
Test	Points	%
Overall:	5 /5 stars	
Adult occupant:	33.42	87%
Child occupant:	43.32	88%
Pedestrian:	36.96	68%
Safety assist:	13.36	83%

ANCAP test results Chery C5 (2025, aligned with Euro NCAP)
Test	Points	%
Overall:	5 /5 stars	
Adult occupant:	33.42	87%
Child occupant:	43.32	88%
Pedestrian:	36.96	68%
Safety assist:	13.36	83%

=== ASEAN NCAP ===
ASEAN NCAP test results Chery Omoda 5 (2024)
Test	Points
Overall:	5 /5 stars
Adult occupant:	36.77
Child occupant:	17.36
Safety assist:	19.51
Motorcyclist Safety:	15.00

=== Euro NCAP ===
In a Euro NCAP testing conducted in 2022, the Omoda 5 received a five-star rating.

Euro NCAP test results Chery Omoda 5 (2022)
Test	Points	%
Overall:	5 /5 stars	
Adult occupant:	32.8	86%
Child occupant:	38.5	78%
Pedestrian:	30.3	84%
Safety assist:	8.3	64%

== Sales and production ==
=== Petrol ===
Year	Sales							Total production
Year	Australia	China	Indonesia	Malaysia (Note: Figures based on registration (Malaysia))	Mexico	Russia	Turkey	Total production
2022		8,258			1,001			27,525
2023	5,370	6,200	3,217	3,803	9,655	37,431	13,003	129,190
2024	6,162	2,722	1,700	8,019	3,347	38,374	12,900	131,237
2025		29,164	840	4,445				

=== EV ===
Year	Sales				Total production
Year	Australia	Indonesia	Malaysia	Thailand	Total production
2024	197	4,425	553	30	23,106
2025		1,404	647	2,619	
