= Omoda C7 =

Compact crossover SUV

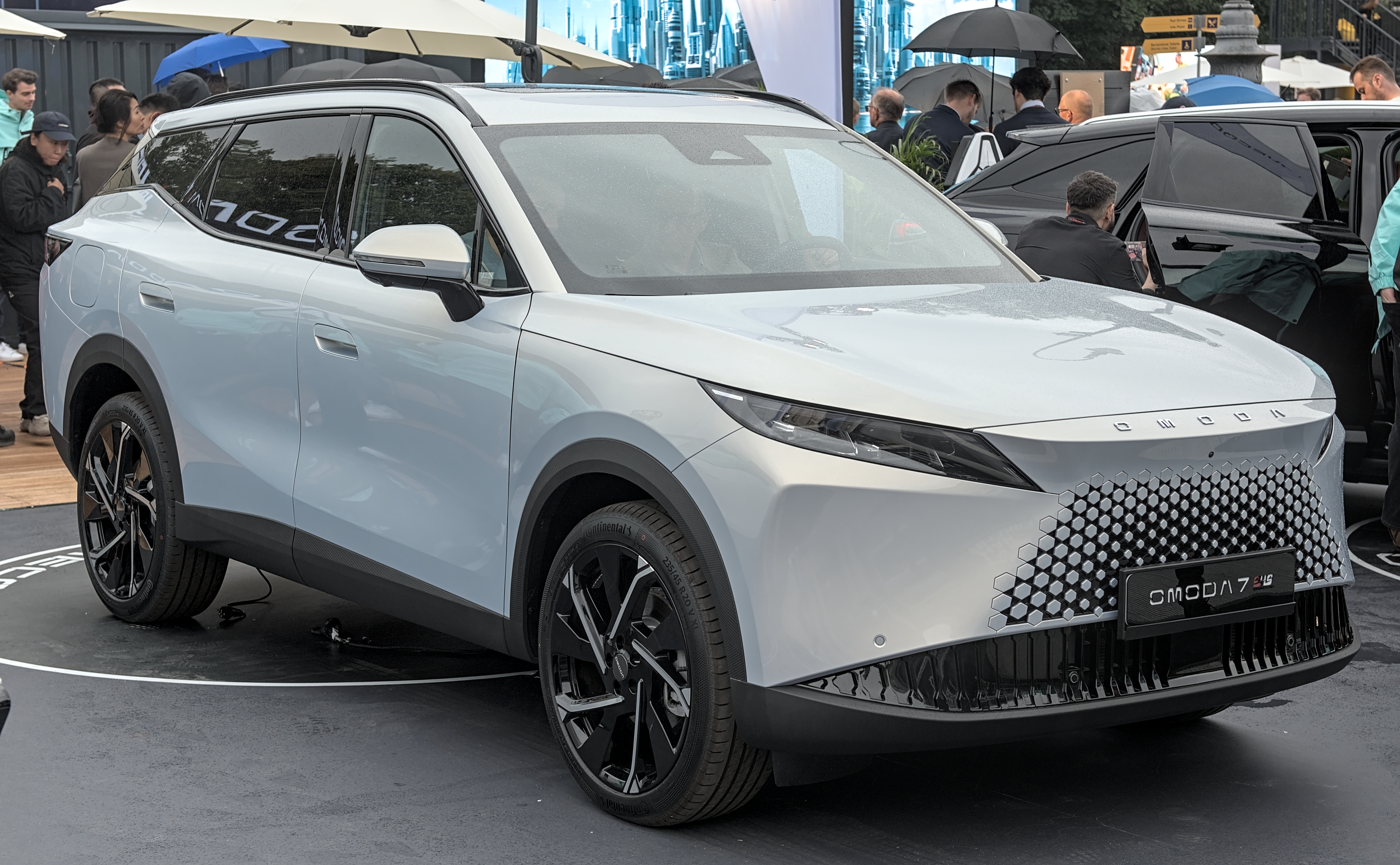

Overview
- Manufacturer: Omoda (Chery)
- Model code: T1GC
- Also called: Omoda 7; Ecoda E7 (Iran); Chery Tiggo 7L (China, 2026–present); Jeland C7 (Russia)
- Production: 2025–present
- Assembly: China: Wuhu, Anhui

Body and chassis
- Class: Compact crossover SUV (C)
- Body style: 5-door SUV
- Layout: Front-engine, front-wheel-drive; Front-engine, all-wheel-drive; Front-engine, front-motor, front-wheel-drive
- Platform: T1X
- Related: Omoda C5

Powertrain
- Engine: Petrol: 1.6 L SQRF4J16C turbo I4; Petrol plug-in hybrid: 1.5 L HJ415 turbo I4
- Electric motor: Permanent magnet synchronous
- Power output: 115 kW (156 PS; 154 hp) (SHS)
- Transmission: 1-speed DHT; 7-speed DCT
- Hybrid drivetrain: Plug-in hybrid (SHS)
- Electric range: 95 km (59 mi) (SHS)

Dimensions
- Wheelbase: 2,720 mm (107.1 in)
- Length: 4,660 mm (183.5 in)
- Width: 1,875 mm (73.8 in)
- Height: 1,670 mm (65.7 in)
- Curb weight: 1,653–1,753 kg (3,644–3,865 lb)

The Omoda C7 is a compact crossover SUV produced by Chery and marketed through the export-only Omoda brand. It was introduced in Wuhu, Anhui, China on 28 April 2024, and went on sale in Russia in June 2025. In the Chinese domestic market, it is marketed as the Chery Tiggo 7L.

== Overview ==
The Omoda C7 is based on a stretched version of the smaller Omoda C5 platform, and will be offered with pure petrol engine and a plug-in hybrid powertrain.

It has a grille consisting of hexagonal elements that get smaller towards the center, creating a gradient effect. The door handles are recessed, and the it has a floating roof design with a black painted roof and pillars.

The interior contains a 15.6-inch infotainment touchscreen which can slide from the center to the passenger side, and has a 2.5K resolution and 1,000 nit brightness. The seats are upholstered in nubuck leather. It has a '12+2' speaker Sony audio system with two speakers integrated into the driver's headrest for navigation prompts and phone calls.

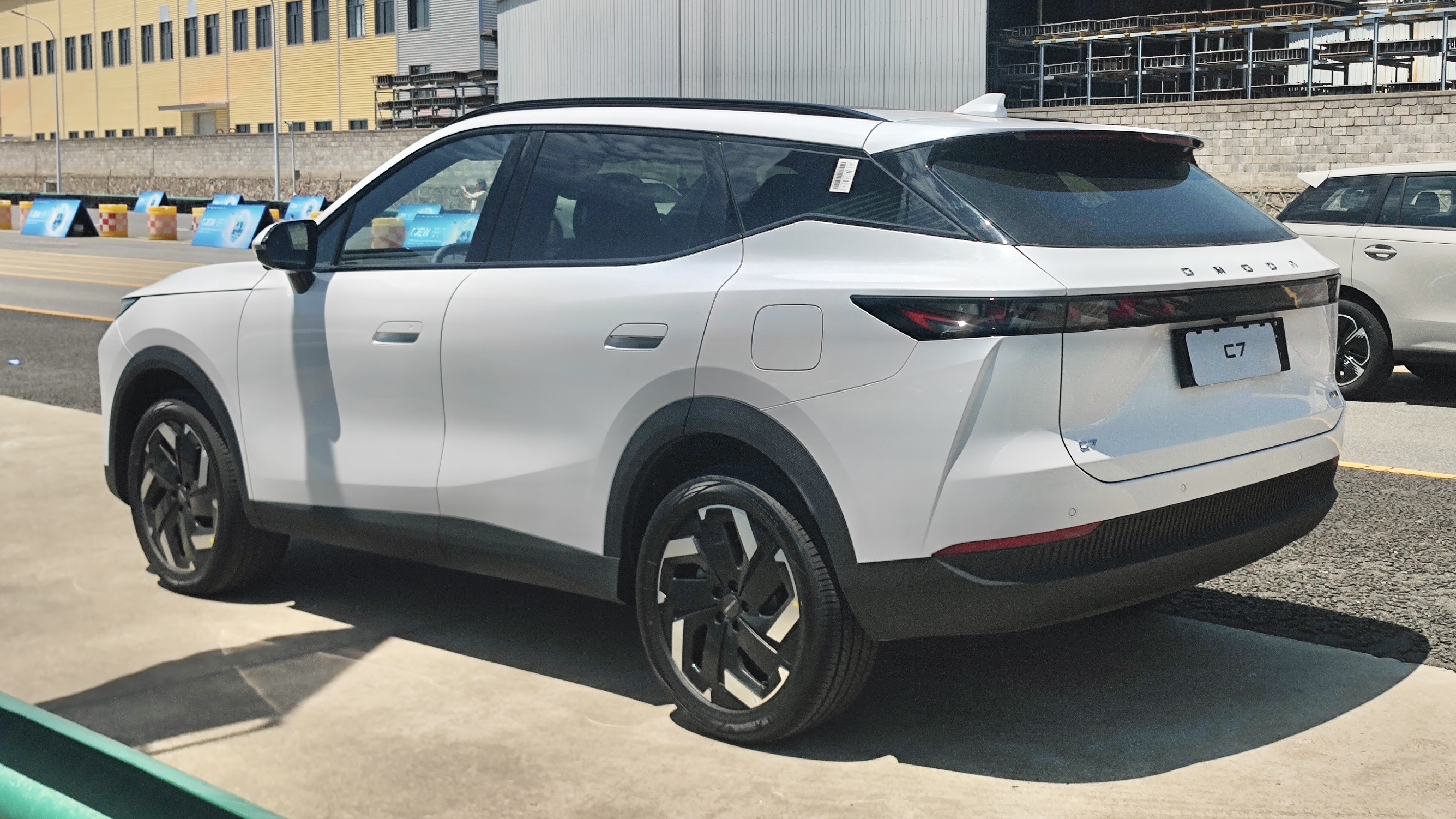
Rear view

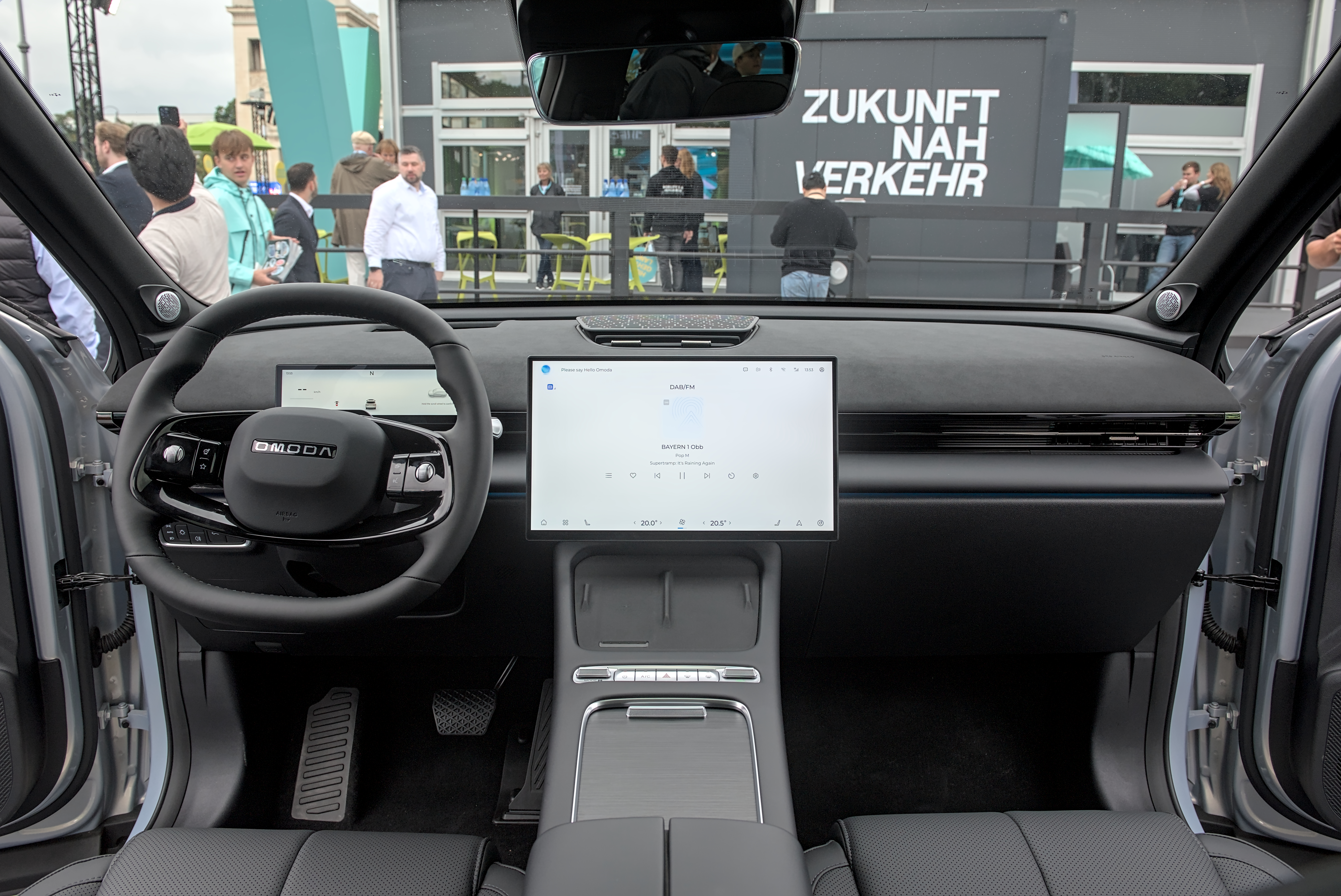
Interior

== Powertrain ==
The Omoda C7 SHS (Super Hybrid System) is powered by the Kunpeng plug-in hybrid system designed by Chery. It has a 1.5-litre turbocharged direct injected petrol engine that makes 115 kW (154 hp; 156 PS) and 220 N⋅m (160 lb⋅ft) of torque. Omoda claims it has an all electric range of 95 kilometres (59 mi), a combined range of 1,250 kilometres (777 mi), and a fuel consumption of 4.98 l/100 km (47.2 mpg_{‑US}) when the battery is depleted.

The regular Omoda C7 uses a 1.6-litre turbocharged direct injected petrol paired with a 7-speed dual-clutch transmission. For the Russian market, the engine is detuned from 137 kW (186 PS; 184 hp) to 110 kW (150 PS; 148 hp).

== Markets ==
=== Brazil ===
The Omoda 7 was launched in Brazil on 29 October 2025, with two variants: Luxury and Prestige, both variants are powered by the 1.5-litre turbocharged petrol plug-in hybrid (SHS-P).

=== Europe ===
The Omoda 7 made its European debut in February 2026 at the London Fashion Week. For Europe, it is available with either a 1.6-litre T-GDi turbocharged petrol and 1.5-litre turbocharged petrol plug-in hybrid (SHS) powertrains.

=== South Africa ===
The Omoda C7 was launched in South Africa on 11 November 2025, with three variants: Luxury, Elegance and SHS PHEV. For powertrains, the Luxury and Elegance variants are powered by the 1.6-litre turbocharged petrol, while the SHS PHEV variant is powered by the 1.5-litre turbocharged petrol plug-in hybrid.

== Chery Tiggo 7L ==
The Omoda C7 variant sold domestically in China is the Chery Tiggo 7L revealed in China on 2 March 2026. Sales were commenced in China on 8 April 2026.
