= Automotive industry in Indonesia =

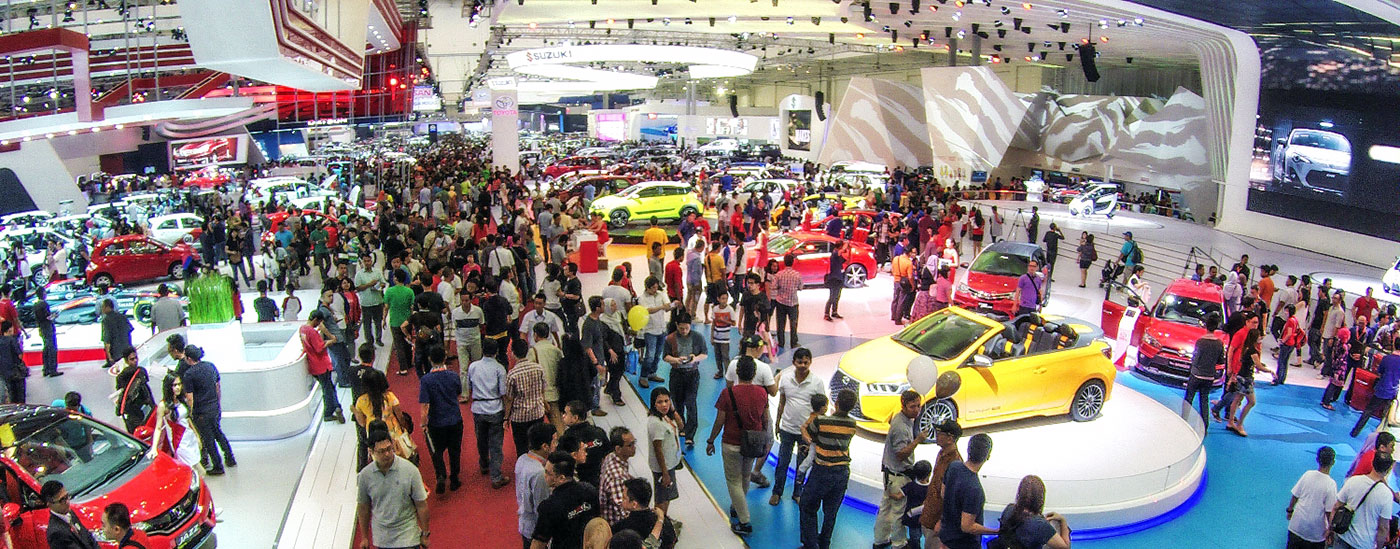
Gaikindo Indonesia International Auto Show (GIIAS), the largest auto show in Southeast Asia.

The automotive industry in Indonesia plays an important role to the economic growth of the nation, contributing 10.16 per cent of the GDP. Indonesia automotive product exports is currently higher in value than their imports. In 2021, Indonesia is the 14th-largest passenger-vehicle producer in the world and the 6th largest passenger vehicle producer in Asia, producing 1.121.967 vehicles.

Most of the vehicles built in Indonesia are from foreign brands, notably Japanese, and produced in the country through a joint-venture plant with a local partner or a fully owned plant. While full manufacturing with a high percentage of local components in the country is usually preferred by manufacturers and encouraged by the government, several plants in the country also conducted a CKD assembly. CBU imports of new cars in the country is also allowed since 1999 with considerably light import tariffs, although it is discouraged by the government.

Indonesia predominantly produces mini or compact MPVs (52 per cent of total production), SUVs and light pickup trucks under one ton. In 2019, a total 26 per cent of its production output was exported. As of 2025, around 9.7 per cent of total automobile sales in Indonesia consists of imported vehicles, notably from Thailand, Japan, China, India and South Korea.

Most automobile manufacturers in Indonesia (including passenger car manufacturers and commercial truck manufacturers) are a member of the non-governmental Association of Indonesia Automotive Industries (Gabungan Industri Kendaraan Bermotor Indonesia, GAIKINDO).

== Characteristics ==
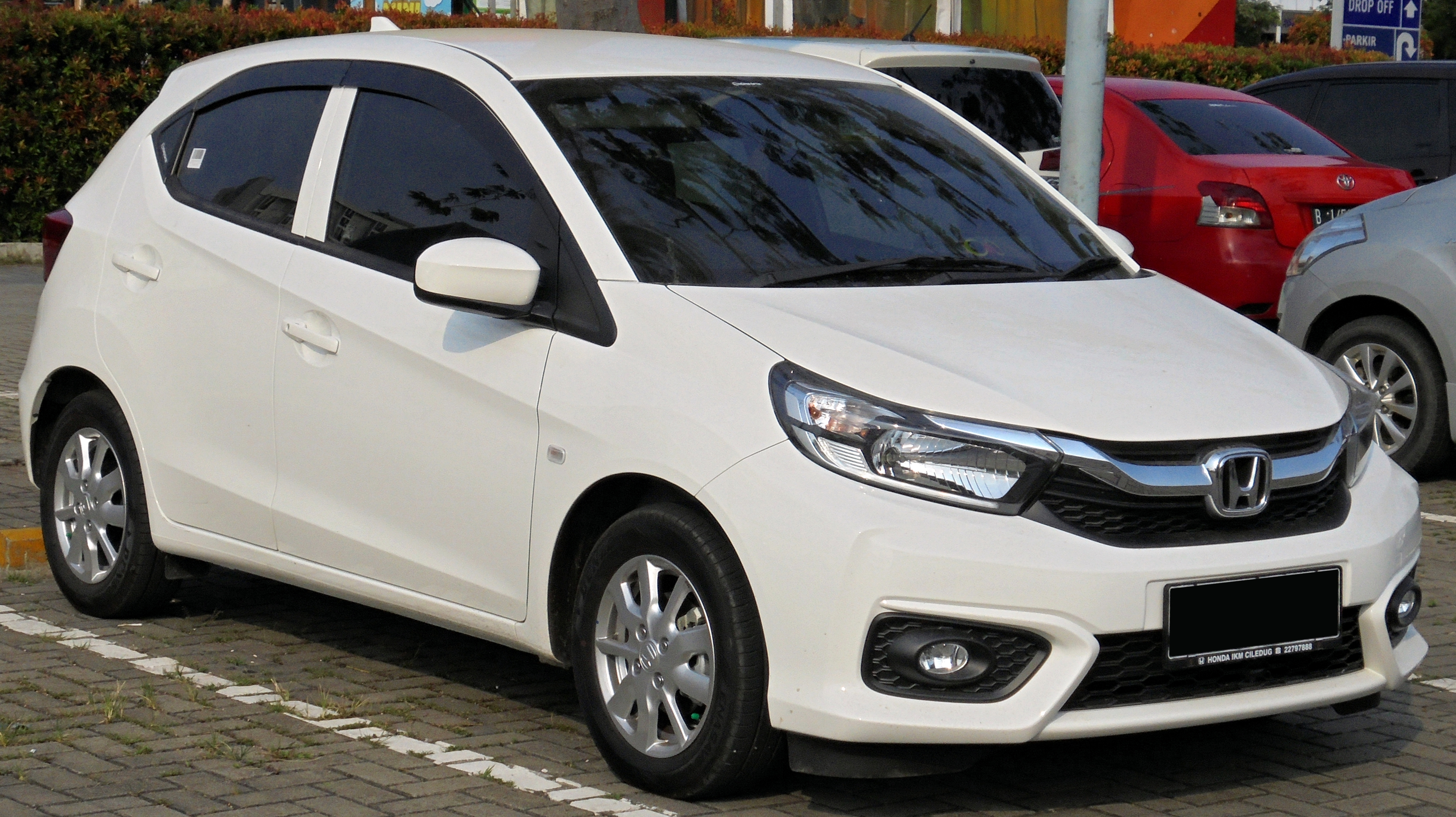
The Honda Brio was the best-selling passenger car in Indonesia in 2020 and 2022.

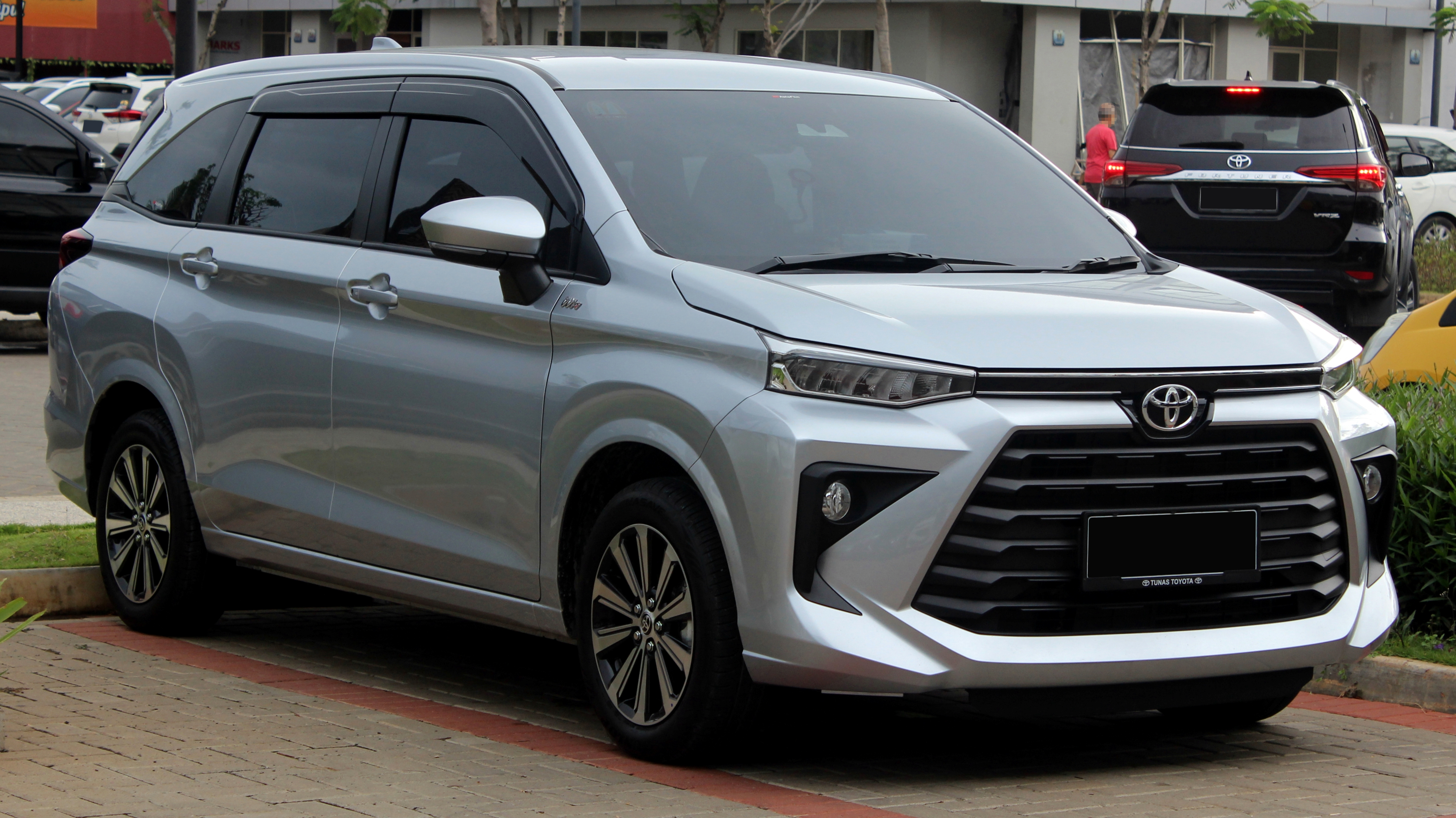
The Toyota Avanza was the best-selling passenger car in Indonesia between 2006 and 2019, and then in 2021.

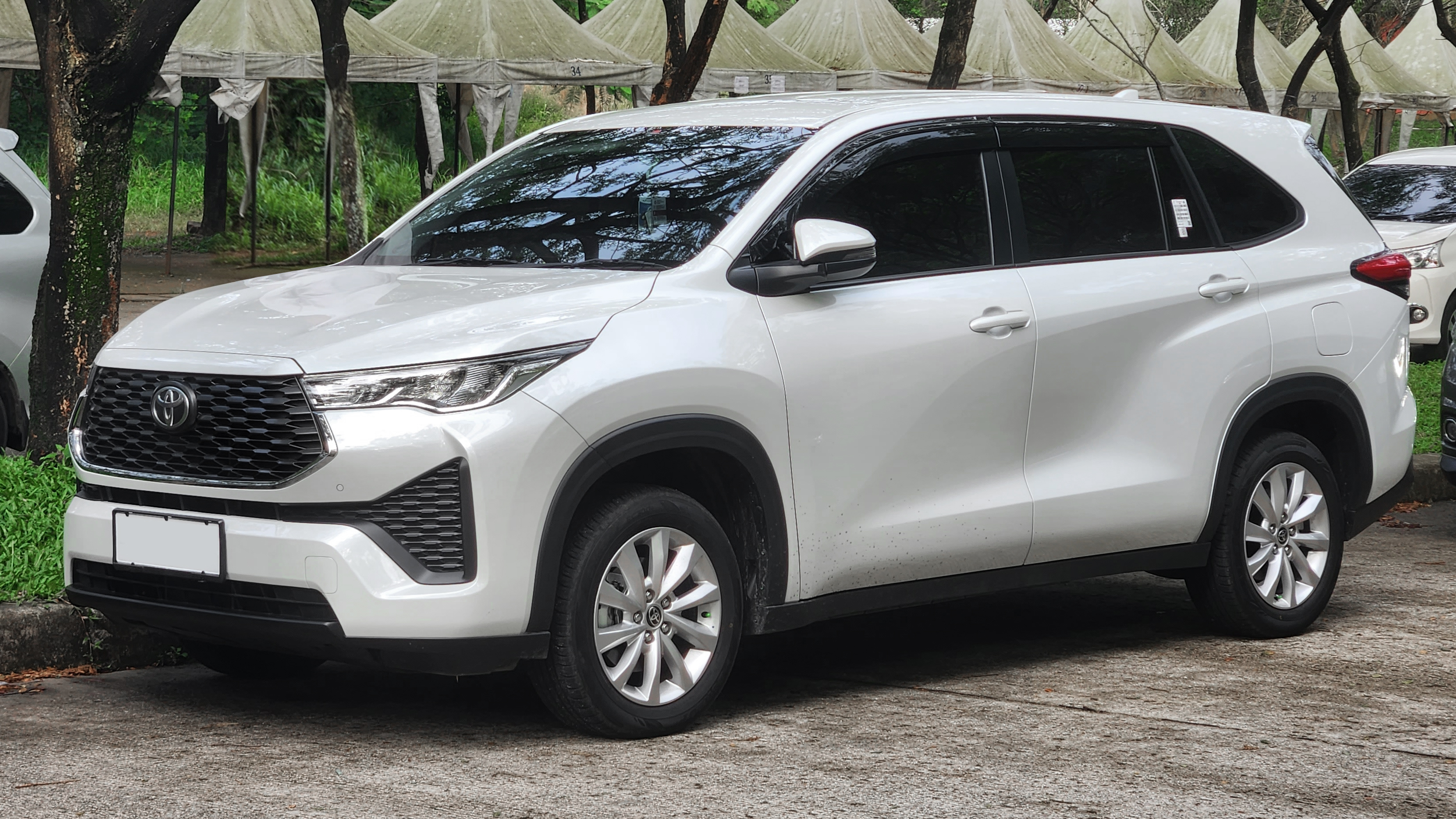
For the first time since its launch in 2004 and in 2005, Toyota Kijang Innova became the best selling car in Indonesia in 2023 until now.

Traditionally Indonesia is a market heavily oriented to Japanese cars like most of its Southeast Asian neighbours. However, while other Southeast Asian markets prefer compact sedans, Indonesian car market has a strong preference to three-row MPVs. In 2019, 96.3 per cent of cars and trucks sold in Indonesia are from Japanese brands. The percentage is even higher than the proportion of Japanese brands in Japan itself which stood at 90 per cent. In the same year, around 550,000 cars or 68 per cent of passenger cars sold in Indonesia consisted of MPVs, crossovers and SUVs equipped with three rows of seats. The percentage is one of the highest in the world. For example, in 2006, models such as Toyota Avanza (16.4%), Toyota Kijang Innova (14.6%), Daihatsu Xenia (7.4%), and Suzuki Carry/Futura (7.3%) had a very high market share. Top ten best-selling models consisted of almost 73 per cent of domestic sales of the vehicles in 2006.

Japanese manufacturer Toyota is leading the market share in Indonesia for decades since the early 80s. Despite that, the largest manufacturer in Indonesia is Daihatsu as several popular Toyota-branded models sold in Indonesia are developed and produced by Daihatsu, which is wholly owned by Toyota since 2016. The subsidiary, Astra Daihatsu Motor (ADM) operates several plants capable of producing a total 530,000 cars per year. Around 2 out of 5 automobiles sold in Indonesia is produced by ADM.

Apart from Indonesian consumers wanting a large car to carry the whole family, the popularity of MPVs or three-row cars in general could be explained by the regulations and the car culture that followed after. When the complete ban on car imports on 22 January 1974 by a Decree No. 25/74 was imposed, the Indonesian government also imposed a tax scheme which saw pickup trucks and minibuses with wagon body style free from luxury goods tax, while sedan cars were charged a 100% luxury goods tax. As the result, a sedan of any size became a luxury-type vehicle for most consumers while minibuses became more popular, even when at the time, despite its natural practicality, tended to be much less comfortable to drive or to ride in. As the result, unlike its neighbouring countries in Southeast Asia that prefers mostly compact sedans, Indonesian consumers are predominantly buying three-row MPVs.

According to GAIKINDO, 82 per cent of the national automobile sales in 2018 is contributed by the island of Java. In 2017, West Java province contributed 19.6 per cent of the national car sales at around 207,000 vehicles, Jakarta at 19.3 per cent, and East Java at 13.1 per cent.

== History ==
The first motor vehicle to arrive in Indonesia is reported to have been a German Hildebrand & Wolfmüller two-cylinder motorcycle, brought in by Briton John C Potter who was a machinist at the Oemboel Sugar Factory in Probolinggo, East Java. The first car arrived shortly thereafter, an 1894 Benz Viktoria belonging to Pakubuwono X, the Susuhunan of Surakarta.

Local production of automobiles began in 1964, originally with SKD assembly of imported cars and commercial vehicles.

Some motor vehicle building activities did take place before independence: Between 1901 and 1903, Max Wenkel is reported to have built some Wenkelmobil cars. In 1927, N.V. General Motors was set up in Tanjung Priok and started assembling cars and trucks. N.V. Demmo started making DKW-engine, three-wheeled vehicles in Surabaya in the 1930s.

== Government programs ==
From 1969, the National Plan for Industrial Development was aimed at substituting imports in all areas of manufacture. A series of laws were enacted in the following years to create this situation, affecting passenger cars as well as commercial vehicles. Gradual limitations on CBU vehicle imports were introduced, reaching a complete ban on CBUs by 1974. A localization program commenced with Decree no. 307 of 1976. This law included a provision requiring the bodies for cargo vehicles of a one-ton capacity or less to be made locally beginning in 1978. The new law then led to a series of sub-sequential decrees designed to minimize its harmful impacts.

Beginning in 1980, new rules were also enacted to inhibit the sprawl of brands, with the government limiting local assembly to 71 models of 42 different makes. All assemblers and agents were to be forced into eight separate groups manufacturing everything except engines. Engines were to be supplied by separate corporations. GAAKINDO, made up in large part of small pribumi operations, was opposed to these programs and also had an outspokenly anti-Chinese leader from 1981 to 1984. The companies most in favor of localization were the large Chinese firms like the Liem Group and PT Astra Motor.

In 1981 the government declared that no engine built in Indonesia was to be of less than one liter's displacement by 1985. As a result, manufacturers of local microvans and trucks scrambled to install larger engines. Daihatsu and Suzuki already manufactured suitable engines for other vehicles, but Mitsubishi did not and used a Daihatsu engine for a few years, while Honda withdrew from the mini pick-up/microvan segment. In October 1982, the VAT on certain diesel vehicles were raised dramatically. Diesel sedans and station wagons, as well as diesel off-roaders, were hit with a 40 per cent VAT, while light commercial vehicles (Category 1) in the form of small trucks, pickups, and passenger vans received a twenty per cent VAT. Some commentators expected this to spell the end of diesel vehicles in Indonesia.

=== Low Cost Green Car ===
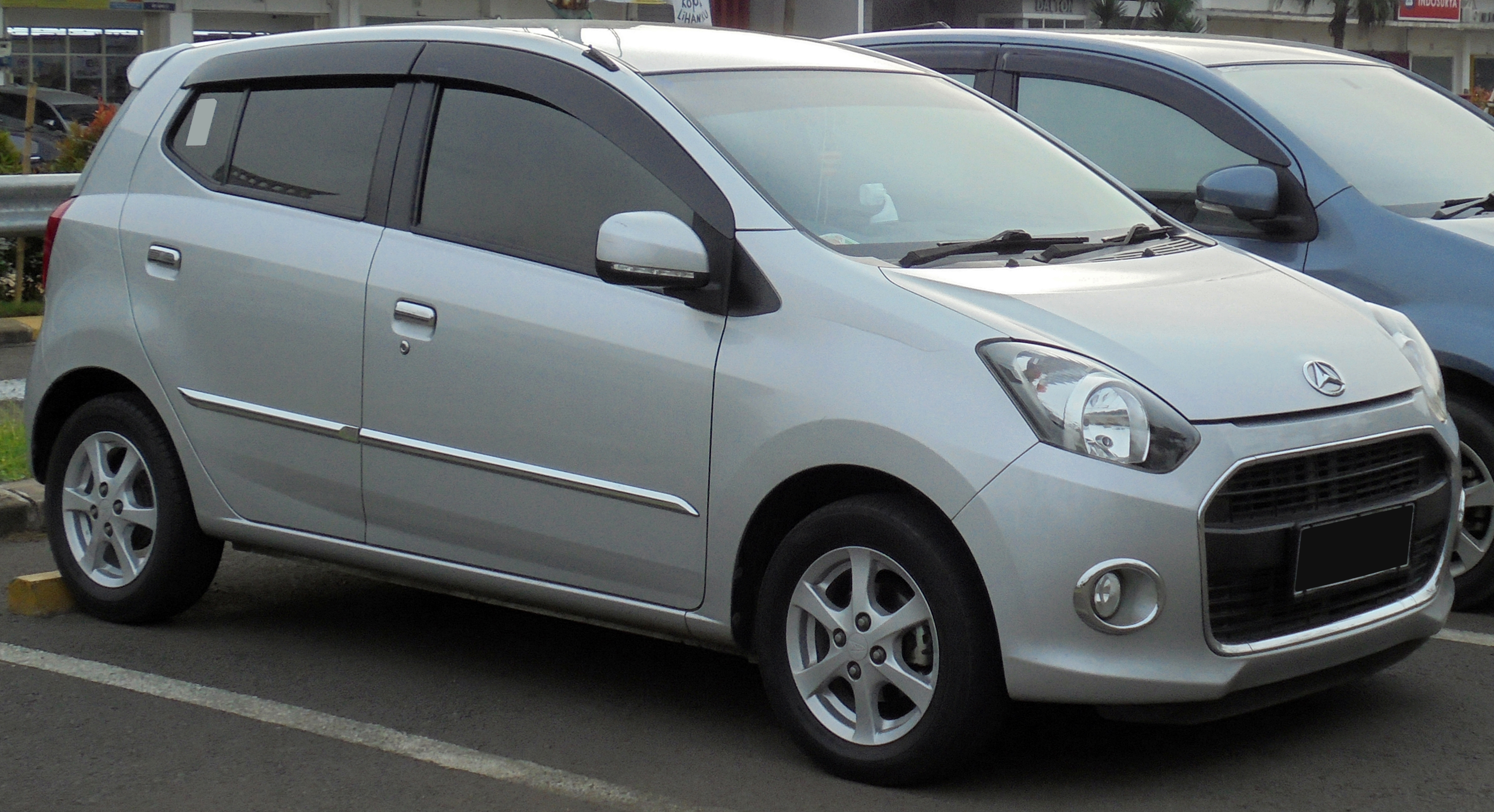
The Daihatsu Ayla, one of the first model in "Low Cost Green Car" category alongside the Toyota Agya.

In 2007 the Indonesian government announced a set of tax incentives intended to help develop a "Low Cost Green Car" (LCGC) as an Indonesian people's car. The initial rules required a low price, set lower for villagers, a fuel efficiency of at least 20 km/L (56 mpg_{‑imp}; 47 mpg_{‑US}), and at least 60 per cent domestic content. A few projects were shown but none made it to market, and in May 2013 a new set of regulations was issued, meaning a 0% luxury tax for cars under 1,200 cc (1,500 cc for diesels) as long as they could meet the same 20 km/L mileage goal. The luxury tax is between 50 and 75 per cent for larger and less fuel efficient vehicles.

=== Local manufacturing encouraged ===
Indonesia levies an import tax of 10% on foreign imported luxury cars, while the import tariff for imported cars from outside the free trade area is currently at 50%.

== Associations ==
From 1969 until 1975, sole agents and assemblers were represented by separate groups, GAM (Gabungan Assembler Mobil) and GAKINDO. In 1972 the government decreed that assemblers and agencies be consolidated and since 1975 the industry was represented by the unified GAAKINDO trade group (Gabungan Agen-agen dan Assembler Kendaraan Bermotor Indonesia, "Association of Indonesia Sole Agents and Automobile Assemblers"). In the first half of the 1980s, GAAKINDO was an outspoken opponent of the government's localization programs. In 1985 the group was reconsolidated into a new organization called GAIKINDO (Gabungan Industri Kendaraan Bermotor Indonesia, "the Association of Indonesia Automotive Industries").

== Manufacturers ==
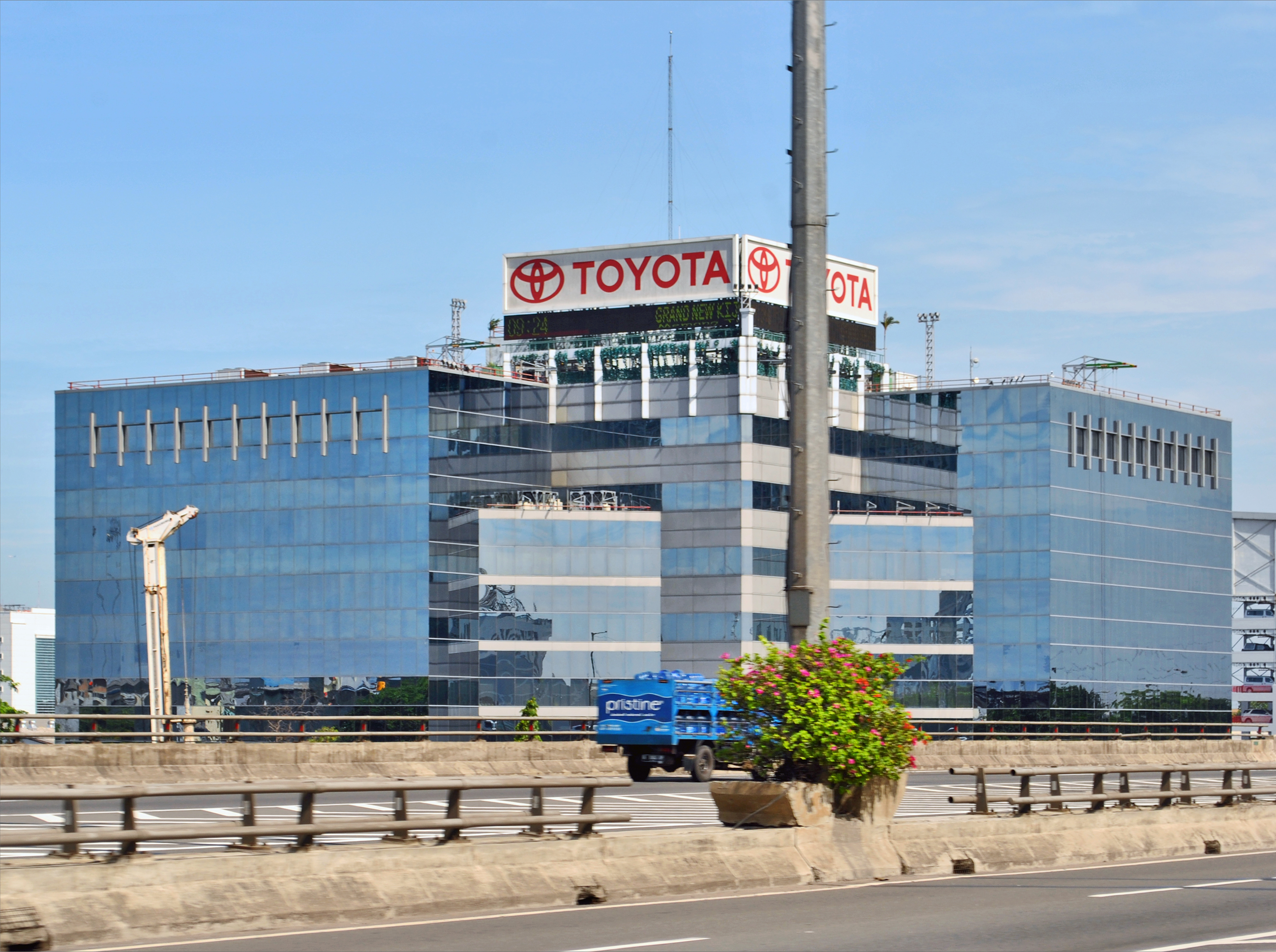
The Toyota-Astra Motor headquarters in Sunter, North Jakarta.

The dominant manufacturer in Indonesia is the Astra International, which is indirectly controlled by Jardine Matheson; their products represented around half of the annual vehicle sales in Indonesia in the early 2010s – in large part thanks to the success of the Toyota Kijang.

Most cars sold in Indonesia were originally European in origins; In the 1950s, the most popular cars were Morris and Austin. Japanese imports commenced on a small scale in 1959 with the Mitsubishi Jupiter truck, but by the 1970s this had changed considerably as the Japanese took an ever-growing share of the market. Japanese cars was first imported by the government in 1961 as a fleet for cooperative across Indonesia. It was a Toyota Land Cruiser Canvastop. The main reason the Toyota was picked is its low price compared to the nominated Land Rover. At the same year, A.H. Budi, the founder of Nasmoco Toyota dealership network in Central Java bought a Toyopet Tiara from an importer in Jakarta. Impressed by the quality of the car, Budi founded the PT Ratna Dewi Motor Coy to retail Toyota cars.

The January 1974 Malari incident started as a protest against Japanese trading practices and included the burning of a Toyota dealership, but sales of Japanese cars reached new heights soon afterwards. By 1980, from 181,100 new registrations, 88.5 per cent were Japanese in origin.

=== Distribution and manufacture ===
In Indonesia, the import, marketing, distribution, and after sales service rights of foreign brands are usually held by firms called ATPMs (Agen Tunggal Pemegang Merek, "sole trademark-holding agent"). ATPMs may be foreign or locally owned, with certain differences to their licensing requirements and scope. Foreign firms, for instance, may not sell directly to Indonesian consumers (Agency), although Distribution may be foreign-controlled. ATPMs may carry out the manufacture under license, or contract the manufacture to third parties (subject to approval of the principal), or may simply act as distributors and retailers. In the case of special-bodied vehicles, such as the angkots offered by many body builders (karoseri, from Dutch: carrosserie), ATPMs also have relationships with specific companies and often sell their designs through their own showrooms.

== Active manufacturers ==
=== BMW ===
NV Spemotri was BMW's main importer of motorcycles during the 1950s; they mainly brought in the 250cc one-cylinder R25, R26, and R27. A handful of BMW 700s were imported to Indonesia by NV Spemotri in the early 1960s; the Salim Group held the import rights until they sold the tiny concession to the Astra Group in the late 1970s. Astra sells BMW through a wholly owned subsidiary called PT Tjahja Sakti Motor. The first BMW to be assembled locally was the 520/4, which was sent CKD and built in Jakarta by PT Indonesia Service Coy. 780 E12 were assembled from 1976 until 1981, with the 520/6 replacing the four-cylinder in 1978. Indonesia Service Coy later built the E28, E30, E36, and E34 models, until assembly was taken over by the PT Gaya Motor company in 1993.

As of April 2001, BMW has their own wholesale company in Indonesia, PT BMW Indonesia, although Astra continues to assemble BMW automobiles through PT Gaya Motor. Assembly is currently of a limited variety of semi-knocked down cars, while the remainder of the range is available CBU.

=== BYD ===
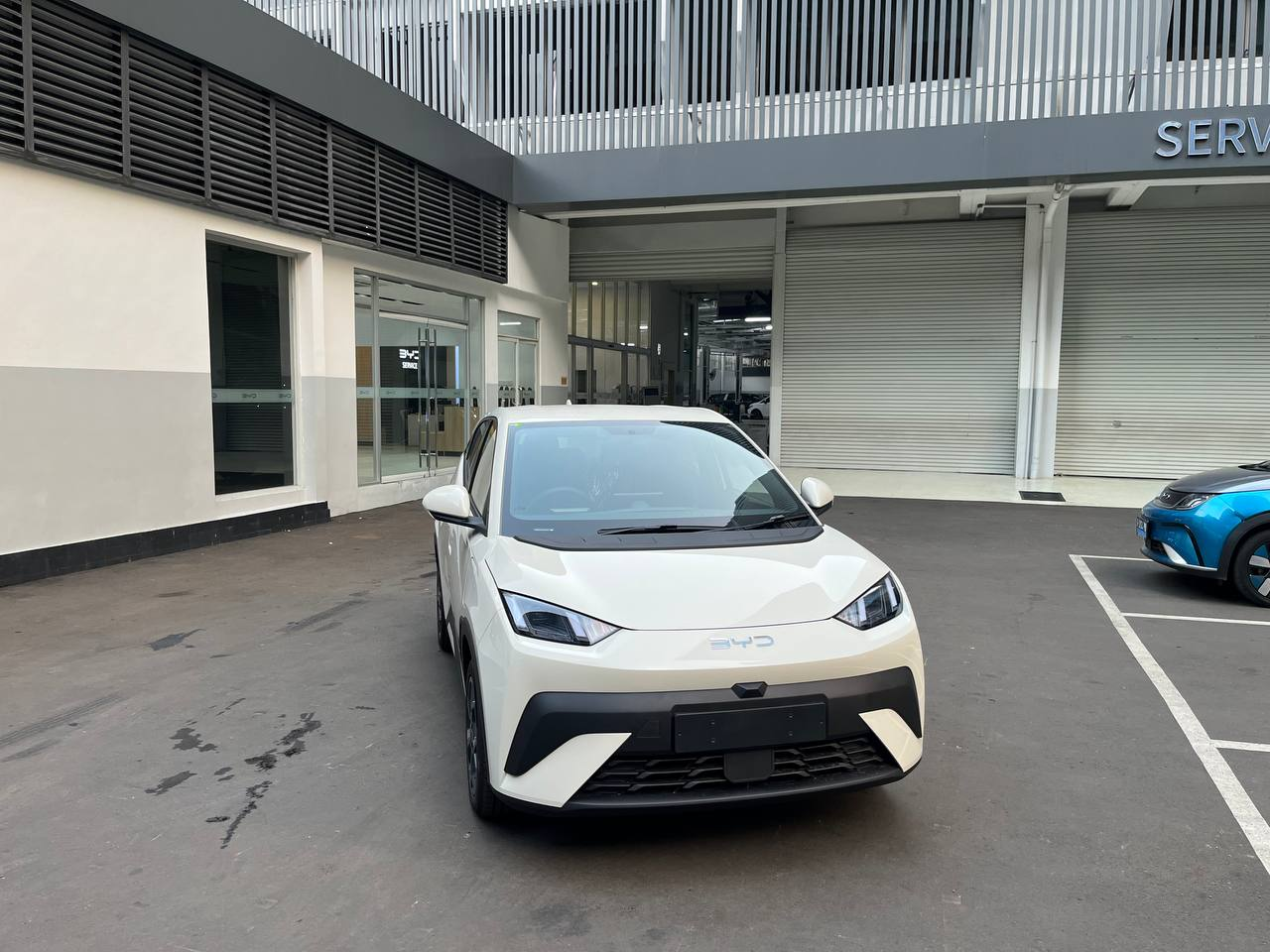
The BYD Atto 1 became the best-selling electric vehicle in Indonesia since October 2025

BYD entered Indonesia in January 2024. According to the Indonesian government, BYD plans to invest US$1.3 billion (Rp 20.3 trillion) to build a manufacturing plant in Indonesia with an annual capacity of 150,000 units. In April 2024, BYD announced the location of its Indonesian manufacturing plant, which was originally located in Subang Smartpolitan, Subang, West Java and plans to stop CBU imports. The plant will be operational in mid-2026.

In January 2025, Denza announced its entry into Indonesia. The first model to enter Indonesia was the Denza D9.

The BYD Atto 1 became the best-selling EV in Indonesia as of October 2025. It was also one of the top-selling car models in Indonesia by late 2025, reaching over 22,582 units.

In mid-2026, the BYD Subang plant started production. The first two cars produced were: the BYD Atto 1 and the BYD M6. BYD Indonesia also plans to produce its luxury sub-brand; Denza D9.

=== Daihatsu ===
The Astra Daihatsu Motor headquarters in Sunter, North Jakarta.

From 1973, when PT Astra gained distribution rights, until the 1980s, PT Daihatsu Indonesia distributed Daihatsus while assembly was carried out by Gaya Motor – both companies were located in North Jakarta. PT Daihatsu Indonesia was a joint venture between a Japanese holding company (30%) and PT Astra International (70%), while PT Gaya Motor was a joint venture between the Indonesian government, PT Astra International, PT Multi France and PT Multi Astra. Gaya Motor was a general assembler and also built Peugeot and Renault automobiles in the early 1980s. Daihatsu's Hijet was very popular in Indonesia, especially after the larger one-litre engine from the Charade was introduced – one out of eight four-wheeled vehicles built in Indonesia in 1983 was a Hijet.

In 2003, Daihatsu through PT Astra Daihatsu Motor (ADM) launched its joint project with Toyota, which spawned the Toyota Avanza and Daihatsu Xenia. Both cars are designed according to Indonesian needs in mind. As an entry-level MPV, it complements the role of Toyota Kijang, offering similar capability in a smaller and cheaper package. Both cars would later send Astra Daihatsu Motor as the largest car manufacturer in the country, surpassing Toyota Motor Manufacturing Indonesia, and saw the Avanza as the best selling car in Indonesia since 2007 until today. 40.8% of Indonesia's total vehicle production output (four-wheel or above) in 2019 was contributed by ADM.

=== Honda ===
Honda first entered Indonesia in the late 1960s through PT Imora Motor as its sole national distributor, with its first model Honda TN360 pickup. In 1975, Honda also introduced the two-door Civic to the country. As a response to the vehicle import ban in 1974, PT Prospect Motor began local assembly of Honda automobiles in Sunter, North Jakarta. The brand then gained reputation for its passenger cars, contrary to several other Japanese brands which relied on commercial pickups and minivans. Honda's best selling products at the time were the Civic and Accord.

In February 1999, Honda established a new joint venture company, PT Honda Prospect Motor (HPM), which took over Imora Motor's sole national distribution rights that same year. HPM integrated Honda's Indonesian automobile businesses, which was previously conducted by four separate companies ranging across vehicle assembly, engine and component manufacturing, and wholesale distribution. A new manufacturing plant in Karawang was opened in 2003.

=== Hyundai ===
Hyundai cars has been in the Indonesian market since the 1990s. It was handled by "PT Hyundai Mobil Indonesia (HMI)" as the sales company with the authorized assembling company entitled to "PT Hyundai Indonesia Motor", which assembled Hyundai cars in Indonesia since 1996.

In 2019, Hyundai Motor Company signed an MoU with the Indonesian Government to conduct business of Hyundai automobiles directly in Indonesia, especially to foster the production of electric vehicles, the Hyundai Ioniq 5 in the country. Since 2019, Hyundai sales company is directly handled by Hyundai Motor Indonesia (HMID) with its head office at South Jakarta, and the newly built advanced manufacturing plant, Hyundai Motor Manufacturing Indonesia (HMMI) located at Cikarang, Bekasi Regency, West Java, both subsidiaries of Hyundai Motor Company.

To welcome and enhance public relations, Hyundai Indonesia initiated to welcome the general public to visit and tour its plant in Cikarang, to witness the automotive manufacturing process directly. The first initiative from the automotive industrial sector in Indonesia.

=== Mazda ===
Mazda first entered the Indonesian market in the 1960s as an imported brand. In 1985, Indomobil started manufacturing Mazda vehicles in Indonesia through its fully owned plant and was distributed through PT National Motors Co. (now PT Unicor Prima Motor), another Indomobil subsidiary. In 1989, Indomobil together with Sumitomo Corporation started work on the PT Mazda Indonesia Manufacturing (MIM) plant through a joint venture. The plant would manufacture the Mazda MR90, a car based on the third generation Mazda 323 Familia. With the support of President Suharto, the MR90 was designated as a 'people's car' to compete directly with the Toyota Kijang. MR90 stands for 'Mobil Rakyat 1990', ('people's car of the 1990s'), as the car was introduced around July 1990. To achieve a competitive price for the car, and with the support of Suharto, Indomobile requested that the government remove the 30 per cent luxury goods tax. This proposal was unexpectedly rejected by the Finance Ministry, citing the absence of a 'national car' regulation and the fact that the car is categorized as a sedan - which meant it ould only be considered a luxury good. As the result, sales were below expectations by an order of magnitude, since the car ended up significantly more expensive than the Toyota Kijang. The Mazda MR90 was later revised and renamed to Mazda Vantrend and Mazda Baby Boomer, hoping to improve sales. In 1998, PT MIM went bankrupt in the midst of Southeast Asian financial crisis and the plant in Tambun was sold to Suzuki.

Between 1998 and 2006, Mazda cars were imported and distributed by PT Unicor Prima Motor before the distribution was taken over by Mazda Motor Corporation, creating PT Mazda Motor Indonesia as the sole importer and distributor. The handover marked the end of production of the locally assembled Mazda E2000 which was introduced in 1996, and also saw PT Unicor Prima Motor transformed into Chery car distributor. Mazda Motor Indonesia solely relied on importing its line-up of vehicles from Japan, Thailand and the Philippines, except the Suzuki-made Mazda VX-1 (a rebadged Ertiga).

In 2017, Mazda Motor Corporation transferred its operations in Indonesia to PT Eurokars Motor Indonesia. Mazda remained an import brand, sourcing Mazda vehicles from Japan, Thailand and Malaysia.

Since 2026, Eurokars Motor Indonesia has been assembling the CX-30 at its plant in Citeureup, West Java through its PT Eurokars Produksi Pratama subsidiary. The Citeureup plant was inaugurated on 28 July 2026, and operational on 29 July.

=== Mercedes-Benz ===
The history of Mercedes-Benz in Indonesia began back in 1894, when The Susuhunan Pakubuwana X of Surakarta bought a Benz-model Phaeton (2000cc, 1 cylinder, 5 hp, for eight people). This was also the first car in Indonesia.

In 1970, Mercedes-Benz collaborated with Volkswagen to set up a manufacturing line in Tanjung Priok, Jakarta, for the Indonesian market. The manufacturer then named as PT German Motor Manufacturing, with another company named PT Star Motor established as the sole agent for Mercedes-Benz vehicles in Indonesia. The factory in Tanjung Priok then began producing Mercedes-Benz commercial vehicles, which included the legendary Mercedes-Benz 911 trucks. In 1973, the assembly line in Tanjung Priok started producing Mercedes-Benz passenger vehicles.

In 1978, the Wanaherang plant in Bogor Regency was established, together with the opening of Apprentice Training Center and After Sales Service in Ciputat. This was followed by the break-up of the cooperation with Volkswagen in 1979.

In 1981, the truck production commenced. One year later, in 1982, the Wanaherang plant officially opened. In 1985, PT Star Engines Indonesia was established in Wanaherang. PT German Motor Manufacturing became the first ISO 9001-accredited automotive maker in Indonesia in 1996. It then acquired the PT Star Engines Indonesia in 2000.

Following the changing name of its parent's name from Daimler-Benz AG into DaimlerChrysler AG, PT German Motor Manufacturing then changed its name into PT DaimlerChrysler Indonesia in 2000, followed by PT Star Motors Indonesia changed into PT DaimlerChrysler Distribution Indonesia in the same year. After Daimler AG broke up with Chrysler, PT DaimlerChrysler Indonesia changed its name into PT Mercedes-Benz Indonesia (MBI). The same happened to PT DaimlerChrysler Distribution Indonesia, which became PT Mercedes-Benz Distribution Indonesia.

In October 2023, UK-based Inchape plc and local automotive company Indomobil through a 70–30 joint venture took over Mercedes-Benz passenger car business, PT Mercedes-Benz Indonesia and PT Mercedes-Benz Distribution Indonesia, from Mercedes-Benz AG.

=== Mitsubishi ===
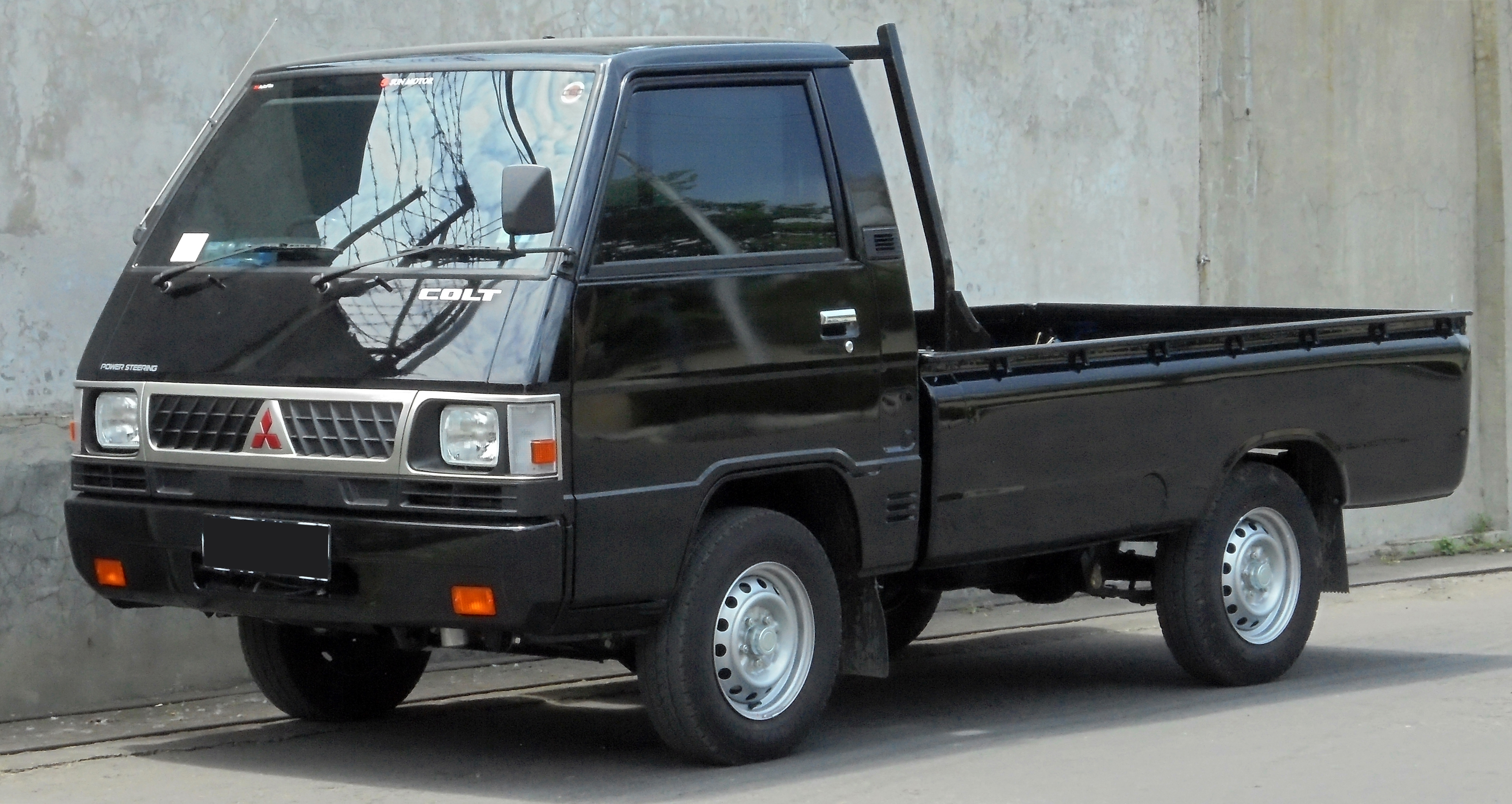
The Mitsubishi Colt L300 is the vehicle with the longest production run in Indonesia under a single generation. Production started in 1982.

Mitsubishi, through PT Krama Yudha Tiga Berlian Motors (KTB) has a long presence in Indonesia, but their first true hit was the Colt T120. This was a locally built version of the first generation Mitsubishi Delica, and from its introduction in the early 1970s it became a seminal vehicle. It was mostly alone in its class and for a generation of Indonesians "Colt" became synonymous with minibus. The T120 was finally discontinued in 1982 and replaced by the L300 (also based on the Delica); but sales never reached their earlier highs. Mitsubishi finally revived the T120 nametag with a Mitsubishi-engined version of the Suzuki Carry Futura called the Mitsubishi Colt T120SS. This alliance with Suzuki was an attempt to challenge the dominance of the Astra Group's Toyota, Daihatsu, and Isuzu.

In 2014, Mitsubishi Motors Corporation announced to build an MMC-owned plant in Indonesia. On 24 March 2015, the construction of a new manufacturing plant in Cikarang, West Java was started. The plant was designed with a maximum production capacity of 160,000 vehicles per year. PT Mitsubishi Motors Krama Yudha Indonesia owned 51% by MMC was established to operate the plant. The plant was started its operation in April 2017 by producing the Mitsubishi Pajero Sport. At the same time, the passenger cars and LCV operations were transferred from PT KTB to PT Mitsubishi Motors Krama Yudha Sales Indonesia (MMKSI). Mitsubishi Xpander was launched in August 2017 and nearly doubled Mitsubishi Motors sales in the country between 2017 and 2018 from 79,807 units to 142,861 units, emerging as the largest market for MMC. In 2019, MMKI surpassed Toyota Motor Manufacturing Indonesia as the second largest car manufacturer in Indonesia by a production output of 193,954 units.

=== Suzuki ===
PT Suzuki Indomobil Motor is a joint venture between Suzuki Motor Corporation and the Indomobil Group. Until recently, the company was known as PT Indomobil Suzuki International. The company is located in Jakarta, Indonesia and specialized in manufacturing Suzuki vehicles for the local market. Their first products were the ST10 Carry and Fronte LC20 of 1976. The Carry (soon replaced by the ST20) saw extensive use as an Angkot. Suzuki's first Indonesian activity was in 1970 through its import firm PT Indohero Steel & Engineering Company. Six years later they had built their manufacturing facility in Jakarta, which is the oldest part of the Indomobil Group. Suzuki's sales rose exponentially in the mid-1980s as sales of minitrucks boomed and the Forsa/Swift was introduced: Suzuki Indonesia sold 13,434 vehicles in 1984, followed by 58,032 in 1985.

Since 2004, Suzuki Indonesia's APV (All Purpose Vehicle) budget MPV has been assembled exclusively in Indonesia. Designed in Japan, it is exported to numerous countries since 2005, to the ASEAN and beyond. It is also available with Mitsubishi badging (as the "Maven").

=== Toyota ===
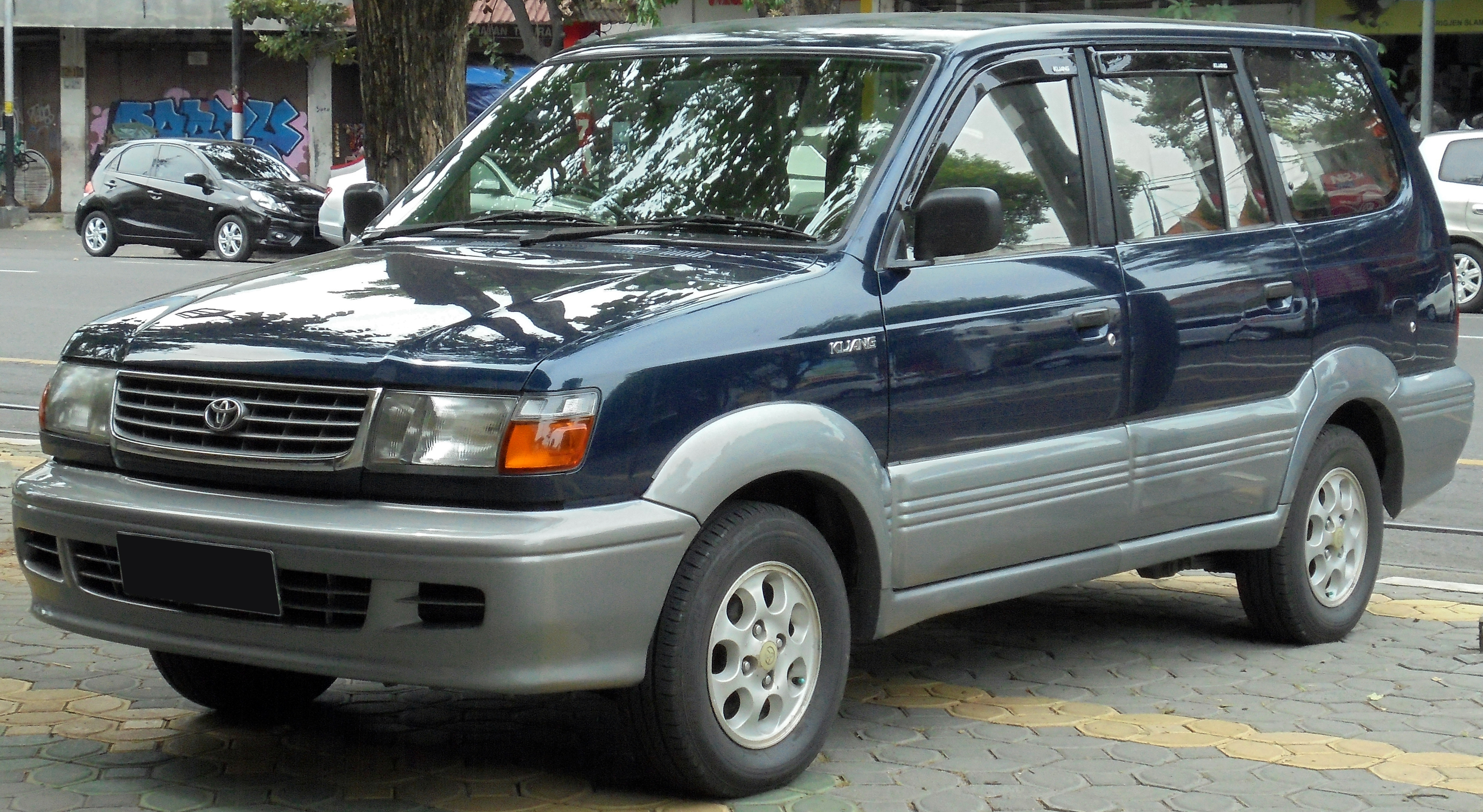
The Toyota Kijang is regarded as one of the most influential vehicles in Indonesian automotive industry.

PT Toyota Astra Motor (TAM) was founded in April 1971. Vehicle production began in September 1974 at the PT Multi-Astra manufacturing subsidiary. Toyota Indonesia's most famous product is the Kijang series of light trucks and vans. The Kijang, developed from the Philippine market Tamaraw Revo of 1976, has spawned an entire range of vehicles and is now built in a number of Asian countries including India. The Kijang was one of a series of BUV's, or Basic utility vehicles, developed for developing markets by several global manufacturers in the 1960s and 1970s. The Kijang was very successful for Toyota Astra Motor, with the 100,000th example leaving the line in February 1985. Production was almost entirely localized by the mid-eighties, with engine parts as well beginning to be produced in Indonesia by January 1985. The Kijang also caused major upheavals among Indonesia's host of small body builders, as the body was built to a whole new standard of quality and was offered directly by Toyota in a number of variants that had hitherto been the purview of the body builders. The success of the Kijang was helpful for TAM as the Crown, Mark II/Cressida, Land Cruiser, and Corona GL were all struggling in the market place in the first half of the 1980s.

The Land Cruiser dominated the "Jeep" category until the early 1980s, when lighter and more economical competitors began taking away its market share. Unable to compete with the smaller offerings from Suzuki and Daihatsu, Toyota chose to not further increase the local content levels of the Land Cruiser and had withdrawn it from the Indonesian market by 1986. Currently Toyota Astra Motor's production is carried out by PT Toyota Motor Manufacturing Indonesia (TMMIN), which consists of the erstwhile PT Multi-Astra as well as PT Toyota Mobilindo (which was established in December 1976 with production commencing in May 1977).

Toyota and the Astra Group remains dominant in Indonesia, with their market share historically hovering from 35 to 50 per cent. They are bigger than the two-second biggest brands combined.

=== Volkswagen ===
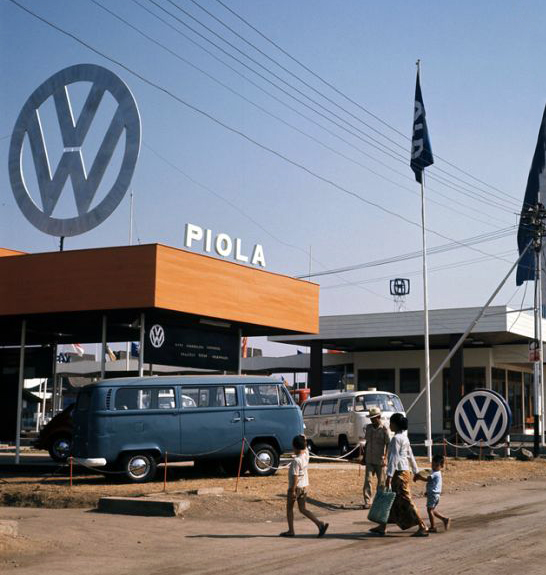
One of the Volkswagen dealers in Jakarta in 1970

Volkswagen and their local partner PT Garuda Mataram was a major player until the mid-1970s but sales dropped precipitously in the latter half of the decade. In 1970, Volkswagen entered into a collaboration with Mercedes-Benz Distribution Indonesia to set up a manufacturing line in Tanjung Priok, Jakarta. The resulting company was called PT German Motor Manufacturing, with Garuda Mataram retaining the Volkswagen distribution rights. The partnership was dissolved in 1979 and Volkswagen went their own way. In or just before 1971 Indonesia's Army Strategic Command (Kostrad) took over the local Volkswagen operations as part of a trend of direct government involvement in vehicle manufacturing (and industry in general). Kostrad owned the Volkswagen agency through its Yayasan Dharma Putra business group, in partnership with two Chinese entrepreneurs.

As with Volkswagen in the Philippines, sales dropped precipitously as the Japanese brands took hold. By 1980, the locally developed Mitra project had come to an end as had assembly of the Beetle and the Typ 181 (Camat). Assembly of German-made Kombis and Transporters ended in 1978. Volkswagen replaced this on their Indonesian assembly lines with the Brazilian-made Volkswagen Combi Clipper. This remained Volkswagen's single model on offer in Indonesia until the middle of the 1980s. By 1986, Volkswagens were no longer available in Indonesia, after 13,162 Volkswagens had been assembled between 1976 and 1985.

In 1998, a new distributor company called PT Garuda Mataram Motor was founded as a joint venture between Volkswagen Group and Indomobil Group. Currently, the company assembles and distributes Volkswagens passenger cars in Indonesia.

=== Wuling ===
Wuling Motors (Indonesia) is established in August 2015 as a subsidiary of SAIC-GM-Wuling Automobile Company Limited (SGMW) with share composition 50.1 per cent of SAIC (Shanghai Automotive International Corporation), 44 per cent of GM China and 5.9 per cent Guangxi Automobile Group. The company has 60 hectares land in Cikarang, 30 hectares is for the manufacturing and 30 hectares is for supplier park for accessibility of the parts.

== Defunct manufacturers ==
=== General Motors ===
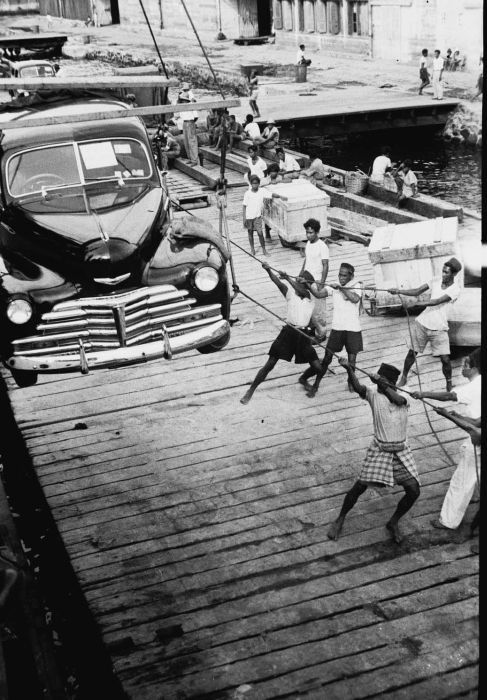
A 1948 Chevrolet Advance Design being unloaded in Makassar in 1949.

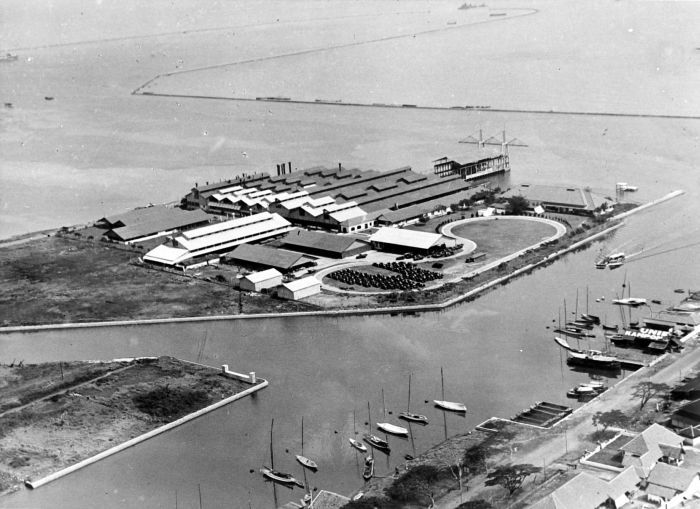
The General Motors complex in Tanjung Priok, Batavia (now Jakarta) in 1939.

A variety of General Motors vehicles have been sold in Indonesia, since the early days of the automobile there. General Motors (GM) vehicles have been represented in Indonesia since 1915. GM established their first local assembly operation (pictured) in Tanjung Priok in February 1927, as "KN Gaya Motor." The location was suitable as there was ample timber nearby, a necessity for car body manufacture at the time. In 1930, the company was renamed "N.V. General Motors Java Handel Maatschappij." Cars from their Jakarta factory were exported all across the region. After having been requisitioned by the Netherlands East Indies government in 1941, on 9 March 1942 all machines and equipment was destroyed to avoid it falling into the hands of the approaching Japanese. Two weeks later the Japanese occupied the plant and interred all foreigners; on 31 December GM wrote off the entire enterprise. The plant was taken over by Toyota, and was used to assemble trucks for the military.

In 1946, General Motors Overseas Operations established a Batavia Branch (later renamed "Djakarta Branch") to continue the pre-war activities, building nearly 20,000 vehicles in the next six years. By 1953, activities had mostly ended as Sukarno's pro-Chinese government took power. As of 1954 local partner PN Gaya Motor continued alone; the Indonesian government took over the assets in April 1955. GM dissolved this paper operation a year later. The government-run operations did not take good care of the plant and 60 percent of the run-down assets were sold to PT Astra Motor (who, coincidentally, had gotten their start by being allowed to import 800 Chevrolet trucks in 1967) in 1969. Astra had expected to sell Chevrolets but were denied the contract and ended up importing Toyotas instead.

A number of other, smaller companies proceeded to import and assemble a variety of GM products. Udatimex/Udatin has generally handled Holdens, while Garuda Diesel/Garmak has sold Chevrolets, Opels, and the short-lived Morina national Basic Transportation Vehicle project. In the early 1970s, PT Kali Kuning (Jakarta) also imported Opels, particularly the Rekord D. Chevrolet, Holden, Opel, and Isuzu badging have been used, often placed on the same cars by the various importers.

==== Holden ====
At the time of their 1959 introduction to Indonesia (although Holden-built Chevrolets first arrived in 1938) Holdens were sold by Gaya Motor. After gaining some popularity in the 1960s Udatimex (part of Fritz Eman's Udatinda Group in Jakarta) took over in 1970. Another sub-company, PT Udatin, acted as the assembler. From 1954 until 1959, Holden Australia held the General Motors rights to all of Australia and Indonesia. The first Holden to arrive in Indonesia was the FC series. Sales increased considerably when the locally assembled Holden Gemini arrived in 1981. Other locally assembled Holdens were the Torana, Commodore, Statesman, Kingswood, and Premier. In the early 1970s, the HQ Statesman was sold as the "Chevrolet 350" by Garuda Diesel (Chevrolet's sole agent in Indonesia), while the Statesman was sold in parallel by Udatimex.

Garuda also developed an SUV version on the basis of the Isuzu KB, called the Holden Lincah. This was superficially very similar to the Isuzu Trooper, but had locally developed bodywork. A small number of Lincahs were exported to neighboring and Pacific Island countries in the middle of the 1980s. A five-door version of the Lincah was also developed, called the Lincah Gama, but may never have entered production. The Lincah Gama was one of the many cars Malcolm Bricklin planned on importing, following his success with the Yugo. While the Gemini Diesel remained popular with taxi operators, with passenger car sales slowing down Udatimex shut their doors in 1991, and regular imports of Holdens came to an end. The last new Holden introduced in Indonesia was the VL Calais. Even as the Indonesian automobile market has grown rapidly after the Asian Crisis Holden did not return, as GMH's export manager Bob Branson decreed the end of exports to countries with annual sales of less than 500 cars in 2001.

==== Opel ====
Opels had also been very popular before the war, with the Opel P4 being assembled in Tanjung Priok. A locally bodied 7-seater taxibus arrived in 1932; an ambulance version was added in 1933. The taxi model was called Oplet (short for the trade name "Opelette") - a name which was used for share taxis in general until the type was abolished in 1979.

In January 1993, GM re-established its presence in Indonesia by forming PT General Motors Buana Indonesia, which is owned 60% by GM and 40% by local partner and previous importer/assembler PT Garmak Motor of Indonesia. The company built a plant with 15,000 vehicle capacity in Bekasi, West Java. In 1997, General Motors took full control of the company. The first locally made product of the new company was the Opel Vectra (1994), followed by the Opel Optima and the Opel Blazer SUV, becoming the first right-hand drive Blazer in 1995. As of 2002, the Chevrolet nameplate has replaced Opel in Indonesia.

==== Chevrolet ====
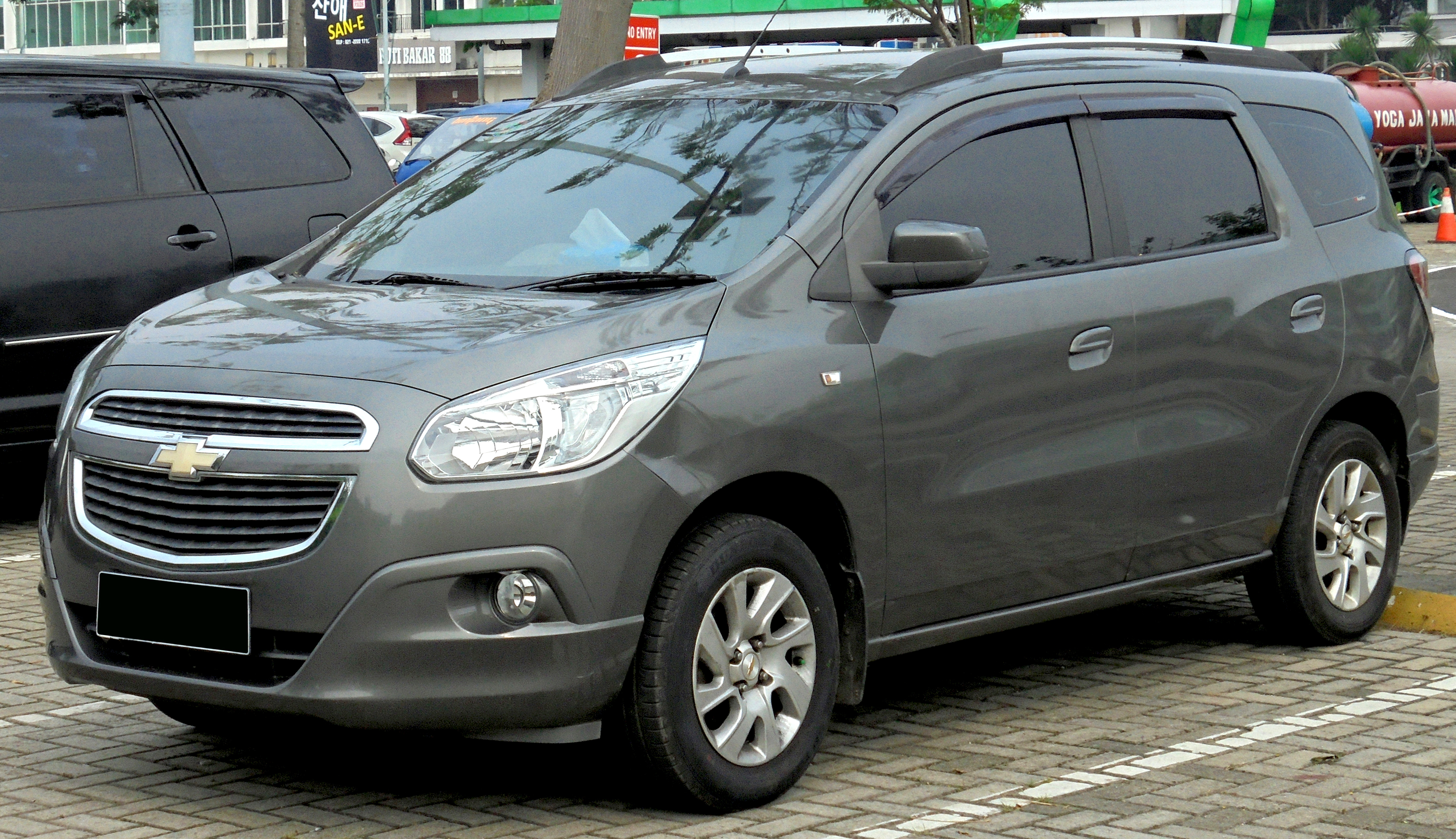
Chevrolet manufactured the Spin MPV in Bekasi, Indonesia between 2013 and 2015.

Chevrolet was one of the most popular brands in Indonesia until the 1960s. In particular the 210-series sold well. Later, the Chevrolet badge was mainly used on various Isuzu products like the Chevrolet LUV and Trooper.

The brand was re-introduced in Indonesia in 2001 with the Chevrolet Tavera, a rebadged Isuzu Panther, and the imported Zafira and Blazer V6 4x4. In 2002, the locally assembled Opel Blazer was renamed to Chevrolet Blazer. It was sold alongside GM dealers, known as GM AutoWorld also marketed the Subaru Forester and Subaru Impreza since 2002.

In 2005, GM ended Blazer production in Indonesia, effectively rendering their manufacturing plant in Bekasi as dormant. GM then imported and sold Chevrolet-badged Daewoo cars from Thailand and South Korea. In 2013, the plant was reopened to manufacture the Chevrolet Spin MPV for the Southeast Asian market. Prior to the reopening, GM stated that the Bekasi plant was a critical part of GM's growth strategy in Indonesia and Southeast Asia. The plant's location met GM's philosophy of "build where we sell and source where we build." The Bekasi plant was closed on 1 July 2015. Chevrolet vehicles were then imported until march 2020.

=== Timor ===
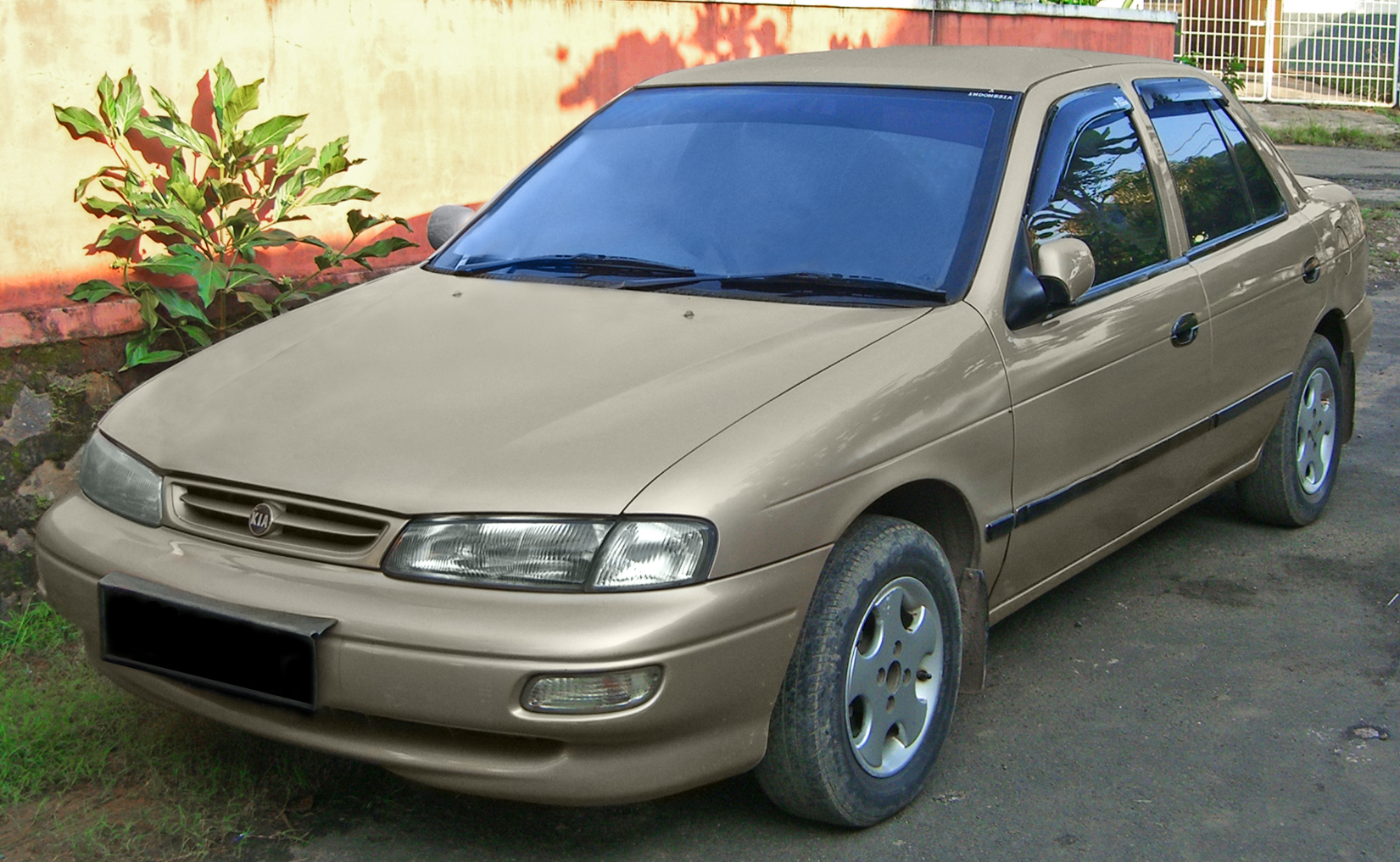
Timor S515

In 1996, the Ministry of Industry and Trade announced a president instruction (Inpress) No. 2-year 1996 regarding the development of the national car industry, instructing the Minister of Industry and Trade, the Minister of Finance, and the State Minister for Mobilization of Investment Funds to immediately realize the national car industry. It also mentioned the pioneer company to do so is PT Timor Putra Nasional (TPN), owned by Hutomo Mandala Putra, the son of president Suharto. TPN is the only car manufacturer to be declared free from luxury goods tax. TPN partnered with Kia Motors to import Kia Sephia sedan as the Timor S515i by a semi knock down (SKD) scheme. The sedan was introduced on 8 July 1996. Due to its low price, the car quickly gained some traction in Indonesia.

However, several countries such as Japan, the United States, and the European Communities immediately protested the national car program and privilege of Timor cars. A lawsuit was then brought to the World Trade Organization (WTO). The program was declared incompatible with WTO rules by Dispute Settlement Body of WTO in 1998. It was proved that the "national car program" violated the World Trade Organization Agreement on Subsidies and Countervailing Duties because the exemption from taxes is a subsidy contingent upon the use of domestic goods. As such, the company had to stop its operations by a presidential decree (Keppres) No 20 1998 issued on 21 January 1998.

=== Volvo ===
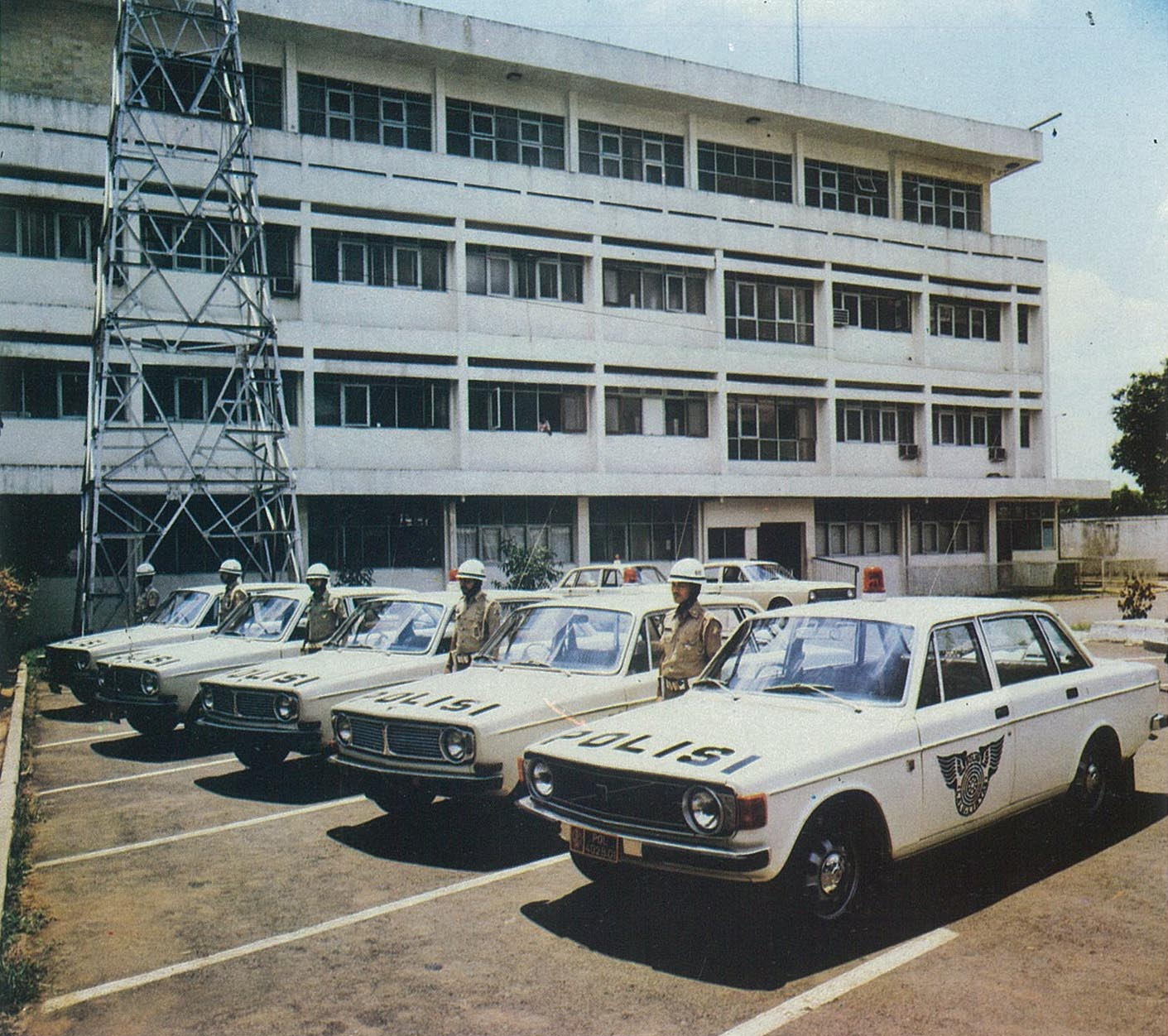
A fleet of Volvo 144's being used as police cars in 1976, a result of Liem's close relationship with the Indonesian government.

Volvo automobiles have been regularly imported to Indonesia since 1971, when Liem Sioe Liong's PT Central Sole Agency gained the concession. By 1975, industrial policy dictated that the cars be assembled locally and Liem responded by creating a joint venture called PT Salim Jaya Motor, operated by his son Albert. A small number of heavy trucks were also imported. They assembled two Volvo models and had a steady market in the form of military and government officials. The venture still lost money though, partly due to the difficulties of collecting money from government officials during the Suharto era. Even with government favor, sales were never very large: between 1976 and 1985, only 1015 Volvo passenger cars (and 201 heavy trucks) were assembled in Indonesia.

In February 2017, Volvo's car division finally appointed Garasindo as its sole agent, replaced Indomobil which has been running for a long time as the distributor. The Salim Group still imports Volvo trucks, buses, and construction equipment, through a company called PT Indotruck Utama.

In 2022, Volvo cars's sole agent changed again, and now Leading Vision Otomotif is the sole agent.

== Luxury goods tax classification ==
Indonesia imposes luxury goods tax (Indonesian: Pajak Penjualan atas Barang Mewah (PPnBM)) based on engine displacement and body type. While dimensions aren't used in the classification, sedan and station wagon body type are taxed differently. This tax scheme was phased out in October 2021 in favour of an emission-based classification.

A vehicle is considered a sedan if the rear window is not a part of the rear trunk opening.

Classification used until October 2021

Luxury goods tax percentage	Engine displacement	Layout	Body type
0%	main article: Low Cost Green Car (Indonesia)		
10%	≤1.5 L	2WD	except sedan and station wagon
10%	any capacity	any layout	minibus with 10–15 passengers capacity
20%	>1.5–3.0 L (petrol) >1.5–2.5 L (diesel)	2WD	except sedan and station wagon
20%	any capacity	any layout	double cabin pick-up
30%	≤1.5 L	2WD	sedan and station wagon
30%	≤1.5 L	4WD	except sedan and station wagon
40%	>1.5–3.0 L (petrol)	2WD	sedan and station wagon
40%	>1.5–2.5 L (diesel)	2WD	sedan and station wagon
40%	>2.5–3.0 L (petrol)	2WD	except sedan and station wagon
40%	>1.5–2.5 L (diesel)	4WD	any body type
40%	>1.5–3.0 L (petrol)	4WD	any body type
125%	>2.5 L (diesel) >3.0 L (petrol)	any layout	any body type

== Active manufacturing facilities ==
Automobile manufacturing facilities in Indonesia is currently focused in the western part of Java, mainly in the Jakarta–Cikampek Toll Road corridor in Bekasi and Karawang, where few industrial estates are located there.

List of active automobile manufacturing plants in Indonesia
Name	Founded	Location	Production			Exports
Name	Founded	Location	Operational scope	Make	Models produced (as of 2026)	Exports
Astra Daihatsu Motor (ADM)	1998	Sunter, North Jakarta, Jakarta	Manufacturing	Daihatsu	Gran Max (2007–); Luxio (2009–)	Yes
Astra Daihatsu Motor (ADM); Plant 1	2013	Karawang Regency, West Java	Manufacturing	Daihatsu	Sigra (2016–); Terios (2019–); Rocky (2021–)	Yes
Astra Daihatsu Motor (ADM); Plant 1	2013	Karawang Regency, West Java	Manufacturing	Toyota	Calya (2016–); Rush (2019–); Raize (2021–)	Yes
Astra Daihatsu Motor (ADM); Plant 2	2025	Karawang Regency, West Java	Manufacturing	Daihatsu	Ayla (2025–); Xenia (2025–)	Yes
Astra Daihatsu Motor (ADM); Plant 2	2025	Karawang Regency, West Java	Manufacturing	Toyota	Agya (2025–); Avanza (2025–)	Yes
BYD Auto Indonesia (BAI)	2026	Subang Regency, West Java	Manufacturing	BYD	Atto 1 (2026–); M6 (2026–); Titan 7 (2026–); Atto 2 (2027–)	Yes
BYD Auto Indonesia (BAI)	2026	Subang Regency, West Java	Manufacturing	Danza	D9 (2026–)	Yes
Daimler Commercial Vehicles Manufacturing Indonesia (DCVMI)	2025	Cikarang, Bekasi Regency, West Java	Manufacturing	Mercedes-Benz	Axor (2025–)	Yes
Eurokars Produksi Pratama (EPP)	2026	Citeureup, Bogor Regency, West Java	Assembly	Mazda	CX-30 (2026–)	No
Gaya Motor	1969	Tanjung Priok, North Jakarta, Jakarta	Assembly	BMW	3 Series (1993–); X1 (2011–); X3 (2015–); X5 (2015–); 5 Series (2016–); 7 Series (2016–); X7 (2021–); 2 Series Gran Coupé (2022–)	No
Gaya Motor	1969	Tanjung Priok, North Jakarta, Jakarta	Assembly	Mini	Countryman (2018–)	No
Handal Indonesia Motor (HIM)	1995	Pondok Ungu, Bekasi City, West Java	Assembly	Chery	Tiggo 8 (2022–); C5 (2023–); E5 (2023–); J6 (2024–); Tiggo Cross (2025–); Tiggo 9 (2025–); Q (2026–); Tiggo V (2026–)	Yes
Handal Indonesia Motor (HIM)	1995	Pondok Ungu, Bekasi City, West Java	Assembly	Jetour	T2 (2026–); T1 (2026–)	Yes
Handal Indonesia Motor (HIM)	1995	Pondok Ungu, Bekasi City, West Java	Assembly	Jaecoo	J7 (2025–); J8 (2025–); J5 (2025–)	Yes
Handal Indonesia Motor (HIM)	1995	Pondok Ungu, Bekasi City, West Java	Assembly	Lepas	L8 (2026–); E4 (2026–); E6 (2026–)	Yes
Handal Indonesia Motor (HIM)	1995	Pondok Ungu, Bekasi City, West Java	Assembly	iCar	V23 (2026–); V27 (2026–)	Yes
Handal Indonesia Motor (HIM)	1995	Pondok Ungu, Bekasi City, West Java	Assembly	Omoda	O4 (2026–)	Yes
Handal Indonesia Motor (HIM)	2025	Purwakarta Regency, West Java	Assembly	Aletra	L8 EV (2025–)	No
Handal Indonesia Motor (HIM)	2025	Purwakarta Regency, West Java	Assembly	BAIC	BJ40 Plus (2025–); BJ30 (2026–); T1 (2026–)	No
Handal Indonesia Motor (HIM)	2025	Purwakarta Regency, West Java	Assembly	XPeng	X9 (2025–); G6 (2025–); G9L (2026–); L03 (2026–)	No
Handal Indonesia Motor (HIM)	2025	Purwakarta Regency, West Java	Assembly	Polytron	G3 (2025–)	No
Handal Indonesia Motor (HIM)	2025	Purwakarta Regency, West Java	Assembly	Geely	EX5 (2025–); Starray EM-i (2025–); EX2 (2026–)	No
Handal Indonesia Motor (HIM)	2025	Purwakarta Regency, West Java	Assembly	Farizon	V8E (2026–); F3E (2026–)	No
Handal Indonesia Motor (HIM)	2025	Purwakarta Regency, West Java	Assembly	BAW	M8 (2026–)	No
Hino Motors Manufacturing Indonesia (HMMI)	2003	Purwakarta Regency, West Java	Manufacturing	Hino	300 Series (2003–); 500 Series (2003–); 700 Series (2003–)	Yes
Hino Motors Manufacturing Indonesia (HMMI)	2003	Purwakarta Regency, West Java	Manufacturing	Toyota	Dyna (2009–)	Yes
Honda Prospect Motor (HPM); Plant 1	2003	Karawang Regency, West Java	Manufacturing	Honda	Brio (2013–); HR-V (2015–)	Yes
Honda Prospect Motor (HPM); Plant 2	2014	Karawang Regency, West Java	Manufacturing	Honda	BR-V (2016–); WR-V (2022–)	Yes
Hyundai Motor Manufacturing Indonesia (HMMI)	2022	Cikarang, Bekasi Regency, West Java	Manufacturing	Hyundai	Creta (2022–); Ioniq 5 (2022–); Santa Fe (2022–); Stargazer (2022–); Kona Electric (2024–); Neira (2026–)	Yes
Hyundai Motor Manufacturing Indonesia (HMMI)	2022	Cikarang, Bekasi Regency, West Java	Manufacturing	Kia	Carens EV (2026–)	Yes
Inchcape Indomobil Manufacturing Indonesia (IIMI)	1978	Gunung Putri, Bogor Regency, West Java	Assembly	Mercedes-Benz	C-Class (1994–); E-Class (1994–); S-Class (2000–); GLC (2016–); GLE (2016–); GLS (2016–); A-Class (2021–); GLA (2021–)	No
Inchcape Indomobil Manufacturing Indonesia (IIMI)	1978	Gunung Putri, Bogor Regency, West Java	Assembly	Haval	Jolion (2024–)	No
Inchcape Indomobil Manufacturing Indonesia (IIMI)	1978	Gunung Putri, Bogor Regency, West Java	Assembly	Ora	03 (2025–)	No
Inchcape Indomobil Manufacturing Indonesia (IIMI)	1978	Gunung Putri, Bogor Regency, West Java	Assembly	Jaecoo	J5 (2026–)	No
Inchcape Indomobil Manufacturing Indonesia (IIMI)	1978	Gunung Putri, Bogor Regency, West Java	Assembly	iCar	V23 (2026–)	No
Inchcape Indomobil Manufacturing Indonesia (IIMI)	1978	Gunung Putri, Bogor Regency, West Java	Assembly	Omoda	O4 (2026–)	No
Isuzu Astra Motor Indonesia (IAMI)	2015	Karawang Regency, West Java	Manufacturing	Isuzu	Elf (2015–); Giga (2015–); Traga (2018–)	Yes
Isuzu Astra Motor Indonesia (IAMI)	2015	Karawang Regency, West Java	Manufacturing	UD Trucks	Quester (2022–); Kuzer (2025–)	Yes
Krama Yudha Ratu Motor (KRM)	1973	Pulo Gadung, East Jakarta, Jakarta	Manufacturing	Fuso	Canter (?–); Fighter X (?–)	Yes
Mitsubishi Motors Krama Yudha Indonesia (MMKI)	2017	Cikarang, Bekasi Regency, West Java	Manufacturing	Mitsubishi	Pajero Sport (2017–); Xpander (2017–); Colt L300 (2018–); Xforce (2023–); L100 EV (2023–); Destinator (2025–)	Yes
National Assemblers	2003	Purwakarta Regency, West Java	Assembly	Volkswagen	Tiguan Allspace (2019–)	No
National Assemblers	2003	Purwakarta Regency, West Java	Assembly	Maxus	Mifa 7 (2025–); Mifa 9 (2025–)	No
National Assemblers	2003	Purwakarta Regency, West Java	Assembly	GAC Aion	V (2025–); Y Plus (2025–); UT (2025–); i60 (2026–)	No
National Assemblers	2003	Purwakarta Regency, West Java	Assembly	Hyptec	HT (2026–)	No
National Assemblers	2003	Purwakarta Regency, West Java	Assembly	Changan Nevo	Q05 (2026–)	No
National Assemblers	2003	Purwakarta Regency, West Java	Assembly	Leapmotor	B10 (2026–); C10 (2026–)	No
SGMW Motor Indonesia (SGMWI)	2017	Cikarang, Bekasi Regency, West Java	Manufacturing	Wuling	Confero (2017–); Formo (2018–); Air EV (2022–); Alvez (2023–); Binguo EV (2023–); Cloud EV (2024–); Mitra EV (2025–); Darion (2025–); Eksion (2026–); Aira EV (2026–)	Yes
SGMW Motor Indonesia (SGMWI)	2017	Cikarang, Bekasi Regency, West Java	Manufacturing	MG	4 EV (2024–); S5 EV (2026–); ZS (2026–); S6 EV (2026–)	Yes
Sokonindo Automobile	2017	Cikande, Serang Regency, Banten	Manufacturing	DFSK	Super Cab (2017–); Gelora E (2023–); E5 Plus (2026–)	Yes
Sokonindo Automobile	2017	Cikande, Serang Regency, Banten	Manufacturing	Seres	E1 (2023–)	Yes
Suzuki Indomobil Motor (SIM)	1991	Tambun, Bekasi City, West Java	Manufacturing	Suzuki	Carry (1991–); APV (2004–)	Yes
Suzuki Indomobil Motor (SIM)	2015	Cikarang, Bekasi Regency, West Java	Manufacturing	Suzuki	Ertiga (2015–); XL7 (2020–); Fronx (2025–)	Yes
Toyota Motor Manufacturing Indonesia (TMMIN); Plant 1	1998	Karawang Regency, West Java	Manufacturing	Toyota	Kijang Innova (2004–); Fortuner (2007–); bZ4X (2025–)	Yes
Toyota Motor Manufacturing Indonesia (TMMIN); Plant 2	2013	Karawang Regency, West Java	Manufacturing	Toyota	Yaris (2014–); Calya (2019–); Avanza (2021–); Veloz (2021–); Yaris Cross (2023–)	Yes
VinFast Automobile Indonesia (VAI)	2026	Subang Regency, West Java	Manufacturing	VinFast	VF 3 (2026–); VF MPV 7 (2026–)	Yes

== Statistics ==
=== Historical statistics ===
==== Sales rank ====
Top 10 best-selling models in Indonesia (passenger and light commercial vehicles), 1990–2024 Source: BSCB, GAIKINDO
Year	Models and ranking									
Year	1st	2nd	3rd	4th	5th	6th	7th	8th	9th	10th
1990	Toyota Kijang	Daihatsu Zebra	Suzuki Carry	Suzuki Katana	Honda Civic	Toyota Corolla	Daihatsu Rocky	Honda Accord	Daihatsu Hiline	Mitsubishi Colt L300
1991	Toyota Kijang	Suzuki Carry	Daihatsu Zebra	Mitsubishi Colt T120SS	Isuzu Panther	Suzuki Katana	Daihatsu Rocky	Honda Civic	Daihatsu Hiline	Toyota Starlet
1992	Toyota Kijang	Suzuki Carry	Isuzu Panther	Daihatsu Zebra	Mitsubishi Colt T120SS	Suzuki Katana	Daihatsu Rocky	Toyota Corolla	Honda Civic	Suzuki Vitara
1993	Toyota Kijang	Suzuki Carry	Isuzu Panther	Daihatsu Zebra	Mitsubishi Colt T120SS	Mitsubishi Colt L300	Suzuki Katana	Suzuki Vitara	Daihatsu Rocky	Toyota Corolla
1994	Toyota Kijang	Suzuki Carry	Isuzu Panther	Daihatsu Zebra	Daihatsu Feroza	Mitsubishi Colt T120SS	Mitsubishi Colt L300	Suzuki Vitara	Toyota Corolla	Honda Accord
1995	Toyota Kijang	Suzuki Carry	Isuzu Panther	Daihatsu Zebra	Daihatsu Feroza	Mitsubishi Colt T120SS	Mitsubishi Colt L300	Suzuki Vitara	Toyota Corolla	Daihatsu Hiline
1996	Toyota Kijang	Suzuki Carry	Isuzu Panther	Daihatsu Zebra	Mitsubishi Colt T120SS	Mitsubishi Colt L300	Suzuki Vitara	Timor S5	Toyota Corolla	Suzuki Katana
1997	Toyota Kijang	Isuzu Panther	Suzuki Carry	Daihatsu Zebra	Timor S5	Mitsubishi Colt T120SS	Mitsubishi Colt L300	Suzuki Baleno	Suzuki Vitara	Suzuki Katana
1998	Toyota Kijang	Isuzu Panther	Suzuki Carry	Timor S5	Daihatsu Zebra	Mitsubishi Colt L300	Mitsubishi Colt T120SS	Suzuki Baleno	Daihatsu Feroza	Ford Laser
1999	Toyota Kijang	Isuzu Panther	Suzuki Carry	Mitsubishi Kuda	Daihatsu Taruna	Mitsubishi Colt L300	Mitsubishi Colt T120SS	Timor S5	Opel Blazer	Suzuki Vitara
2000	Toyota Kijang	Suzuki Carry	Isuzu Panther	Daihatsu Taruna	Mitsubishi Kuda	Mitsubishi Colt L300	Toyota Soluna	Timor S5	Suzuki Baleno	Daihatsu Zebra
2001	Toyota Kijang	Suzuki Carry	Isuzu Panther	Mitsubishi Colt L300	Mitsubishi Colt T120SS	Daihatsu Taruna	Daihatsu Zebra	Toyota Soluna	Mitsubishi Kuda	Honda CR-V
2002	Toyota Kijang	Suzuki Carry	Isuzu Panther	Mitsubishi Colt T120SS	Mitsubishi Colt L300	Mitsubishi Kuda	Daihatsu Zebra	Daihatsu Taruna	Toyota Soluna	Honda CR-V
2003	Toyota Kijang	Suzuki Carry	Mitsubishi Colt T120SS	Isuzu Panther	Mitsubishi Colt L300	Daihatsu Zebra	Honda CR-V	Mitsubishi Kuda	Honda City	Daihatsu Taruna
2004	Toyota Kijang Innova	Suzuki Carry	Toyota Avanza	Honda Jazz	Daihatsu Xenia	Mitsubishi Colt T120SS	Daihatsu Zebra	Mitsubishi Colt L300	Isuzu Panther	Toyota Vios
2005	Toyota Kijang Innova	Toyota Avanza	Suzuki Carry	Honda Jazz	Suzuki APV	Daihatsu Xenia	Mitsubishi Colt T120SS	Mitsubishi Colt L300	Isuzu Panther	Daihatsu Zebra
2006	Toyota Avanza	Toyota Kijang Innova	Suzuki Carry	Daihatsu Xenia	Honda Jazz	Suzuki APV	Isuzu Panther	Toyota Yaris	Mitsubishi Colt L300	Daihatsu Zebra
2007	Toyota Avanza	Toyota Kijang Innova	Daihatsu Xenia	Suzuki Carry	Daihatsu Terios	Toyota Rush	Honda Jazz	Nissan Livina	Suzuki APV	Mitsubishi Colt L300
2008	Toyota Avanza	Toyota Kijang Innova	Daihatsu Xenia	Daihatsu Gran Max	Nissan Livina	Honda Jazz	Suzuki Carry	Suzuki APV	Honda CR-V	Mitsubishi Colt L300
2009	Toyota Avanza	Daihatsu Xenia	Toyota Kijang Innova	Suzuki Carry	Honda Jazz	Daihatsu Gran Max	Nissan Livina	Daihatsu Terios	Toyota Rush	Suzuki APV
2010	Toyota Avanza	Daihatsu Xenia	Toyota Kijang Innova	Suzuki Carry	Daihatsu Gran Max	Nissan Livina	Honda Jazz	Mitsubishi Colt L300	Toyota Rush	Suzuki APV
2011	Toyota Avanza	Daihatsu Xenia	Toyota Kijang Innova	Suzuki Carry	Nissan Livina	Daihatsu Gran Max	Mitsubishi Colt L300	Toyota Rush	Mitsubishi T120SS	Daihatsu Terios
2012	Toyota Avanza	Daihatsu Xenia	Toyota Kijang Innova	Daihatsu Gran Max	Suzuki Carry	Nissan Livina	Suzuki Ertiga	Toyota Rush	Toyota Yaris	Mitsubishi Colt L300
2013	Toyota Avanza	Daihatsu Xenia	Toyota Kijang Innova	Daihatsu Gran Max	Suzuki Ertiga	Suzuki Carry	Nissan Livina	Toyota Rush	Mitsubishi Colt T120SS	Honda Jazz
2014	Toyota Avanza	Honda Mobilio	Toyota Agya	Daihatsu Gran Max	Toyota Kijang Innova	Suzuki Carry	Suzuki Ertiga	Daihatsu Xenia	Daihatsu Ayla	Mitsubishi Colt T120SS
2015	Toyota Avanza	Daihatsu Gran Max	Toyota Agya	Suzuki Carry	Honda Brio	Toyota Kijang Innova	Honda HR-V	Daihatsu Xenia	Daihatsu Ayla	Suzuki Ertiga
2016	Toyota Avanza	Toyota Kijang Innova	Daihatsu Gran Max	Toyota Calya	Honda Brio	Toyota Agya	Daihatsu Xenia	Honda HR-V	Daihatsu Ayla	Honda BR-V
2017	Toyota Avanza	Toyota Calya	Toyota Kijang Innova	Daihatsu Gran Max	Honda Brio	Daihatsu Sigra	Honda HR-V	Daihatsu Xenia	Suzuki Ertiga	Suzuki Carry
2018	Toyota Avanza	Mitsubishi Xpander	Toyota Calya	Toyota Kijang Innova	Honda Brio	Daihatsu Gran Max	Toyota Rush	Daihatsu Sigra	Suzuki Carry	Honda HR-V
2019	Toyota Avanza	Honda Brio	Mitsubishi Xpander	Toyota Rush	Toyota Calya	Suzuki Carry	Toyota Kijang Innova	Daihatsu Gran Max	Daihatsu Sigra	Mitsubishi Colt L300
2020	Honda Brio	Suzuki Carry	Toyota Avanza	Daihatsu Gran Max	Toyota Rush	Toyota Kijang Innova	Mitsubishi Xpander	Toyota Calya	Daihatsu Sigra	Mitsubishi Colt L300
2021	Toyota Avanza	Mitsubishi Xpander	Daihatsu Gran Max	Suzuki Carry	Toyota Rush	Toyota Kijang Innova	Honda Brio	Daihatsu Sigra	Toyota Calya	Mitsubishi Colt L300
2022	Honda Brio	Toyota Avanza	Suzuki Carry	Daihatsu Sigra	Mitsubishi Xpander	Daihatsu Gran Max	Toyota Kijang Innova	Toyota Rush	Toyota Calya	Toyota Veloz
2023	Toyota Kijang Innova	Honda Brio	Daihatsu Sigra	Toyota Avanza	Toyota Calya	Daihatsu Gran Max	Mitsubishi Xpander	Suzuki Carry	Toyota Rush	Honda HR-V
2024	Toyota Kijang Innova	Toyota Avanza	Daihatsu Sigra	Honda Brio	Daihatsu Gran Max	Toyota Calya	Mitsubishi Xpander	Toyota Rush	Suzuki Carry	Toyota Agya
2025	Toyota Kijang Innova	Daihatsu Gran Max	Toyota Avanza	Daihatsu Sigra	Honda Brio	Toyota Calya	Toyota Rush	Suzuki Carry	Mitsubishi Xpander	BYD Atto 1
	1st	2nd	3rd	4th	5th	6th	7th	8th	9th	10th
Note: 1. Suzuki Vitara includes Escudo and Sidekick 2. Suzuki Carry not including Mega Carry 3. Daihatsu Gran Max not including van/panel van models 4. Nissan Livina includes two-row Livina and three-row Grand Livina 5. Honda Brio includes LCGC Brio Satya 6. Mitsubishi Xpander includes Xpander Cross 7. Toyota Avanza not including W100 series Veloz 8. Toyota Kijang Innova includes AN140 series and AG10 series
See also : Best-selling models in: Australia; Brazil; India; Japan; Malaysia; Philippines; Thailand; Sweden

==== Industry data ====
Calendar Year	Wholesales	Retail Sales	Production	Exports (CBU)
1990	223,547	not available	not available	not available
1991	215,644	not available	not available	not available
1992	150,221	not available	not available	not available
1993	184,977	not available	not available	not available
1994	279,228	not available	not available	not available
1995	326,965	not available	not available	not available
1996	278,416	not available	not available	not available
1997	336,968	not available	not available	not available
1998	53,412	not available	not available	not available
1999	84,928	not available	not available	not available
2000	289,747	not available	not available	not available
2001	270,920	not available	not available	not available
2002	288,553	not available	not available	not available
2003	320,457	not available	not available	not available
2004	441,912	not available	not available	9,572
2005	533,917	not available	not available	17,805
2006	318,904	not available	not available	30,974
2007	433,341	not available	not available	60,267
2008	603,774	not available	not available	100,982
2009	486,088	not available	464,816	56,669
2010	764,710	not available	702,508	85,769
2011	894,164	890,559	838,388	107,932
2012	1,116,230	1,098,331	1,052,895	173,371
2013	1,229,811	1,218,817	1,206,368	170,958
2014	1,208,019	1,195,409	1,298,523	202,273
2015	1,013,518	1,031,842	1,098,780	207,961
2016	1,062,694	1,073,547	1,178,346	194,395
2017	1,077,365	1,067,396	1,217,518	231,169
2018	1,151,284	1,152,641	1,343,743	264,553
2019	1,030,126	1,043,017	1,286,848	332,023
2020	532,027	578,327	690,150	232,175
2021	887,202	863,348	1,121,967	294,639
2022	1,048,040	1,013,582	1,470,146	473,602
2023	1,005,802	998,059	1,395,717	505,134
2024	865,723	889,680	1,196,664	472,194
2025	803,687	833,712	1,147,600	518,212
