= GMM =

GMM may refer to:

- Garuda Mataram Motor, company of Indonesia
- Generalized method of moments, an econometric method
- GMM Grammy, a Thai entertainment company
- Gaussian mixture model, a statistical probabilistic model
- Google Map Maker, a public cartography project
- GMM, IATA code for Gamboma Airport in the Republic of the Congo
- Good Mythical Morning, an online morning talk show hosted by YouTubers, Rhett and Link
- Global Marijuana March, a worldwide demonstration associated with cannabis culture
- Graspop Metal Meeting, a Belgian heavy metal festival held annually in Dessel
- Greater Metro Manila, also known as the Greater Manila Area
- Gimar Montaz Mautino, a French manufacturer of ski lifts
