= Auto Euro Indonesia =

Company of Indonesia

PT Auto Euro Indonesia
- Company type: Joint venture
- Industry: Automotive
- Founded: 2001
- Defunct: 2019
- Successor: Maxindo Renault Indonesia
- Headquarters: Jakarta, Indonesia

PT Auto Euro Indonesia was a joint venture between Renault S.A. and the PT Indomobil Group for the assembly and distribution of cars for the local market. It was founded in 2001 and is located in Jakarta, Indonesia. It was succeeded by Maxindo Renaut Indonesia.

The company had assembled several models, such as Renault Mégane and Renaut Duster.
