= Indomobil =

Indonesian automotive company

PT Indomobil Sukses Internasional Tbk
- Formerly: PT Indomobil Investment Corporation (1976-1997)
- Type: Public PT
- Traded as: IDX: IMAS
- Industry: automotive; financial; logistics; energy
- Predecessor: PT Indomobil Investment Corpora; PT Indomobil Inti Industri Tbk
- Founded: 1976; 50 years ago
- Headquarters: Jakarta
- Key people: Jusak Kertowidjojo (President Director); Eugene Cho Park (President Commissioner)
- Revenue: ▲ Rp 28,892 trillion (2023)
- Operating income: ▲ Rp 2,793 trillion (2023)
- Net income: ▲ Rp 1,551 trillion (2023)
- Owners: Gallant Venture (49.49%); Sejahtera Raya Perkasa (20.24%); Tritunggal Intipermata (18.17%)
- Number of employees: 15.242 (2023)
- Website: www.indomobil.com

PT Indomobil Sukses Internasional Tbk, known as Indomobil Group, is a car and motor vehicle manufacturer located in Jakarta, Indonesia. It was founded in 1976 by the unification of the two former competitors PT Indohero and the original incarnation of PT Indomobil. The company operates plants in Jakarta, Bekasi, Bekasi Regency, and Purwakarta Regency.

As of 2026, the group distributes (and manufactures some) vehicle marques such as; Audi, Changan, Citroën, Dongfeng, Foton, GAC Aion, Great Wall Motor, Harley-Davidson, Hino, Hongqi, JAC, Jaguar Land Rover, Jeep, Leapmotor, Maxus, Mercedes-Benz, Nissan, Renault Trucks, Suzuki, Volkswagen, Volvo Buses, and Volvo Trucks.

== Current business ==
=== Passenger cars ===
- Mercedes-Benz, sole assembly and distribution of the marque since October 2023, distributed through PT Inchcape Indomobil Distribution Indonesia (JV with Inchcape, 30% owned by Indomobil Group), and assembled by a 42 hectare assembly plant in Bogor, owned by its subsidiary, PT Inchcape Indomobil Manufacturing Indonesia.
- Volkswagen and Audi, distributed through PT Garuda Mataram Motor (99.93%).
- Nissan, with PT Nissan Motor Distributor Indonesia (99.90%) as the sole distributor. Previously, a plant owned by PT Nissan Motor Indonesia (1%) assemble the Nissan cars, before the automaker decided to move the assembly plant to Thailand in 2019.
- Suzuki, with PT Suzuki Indomobil Sales (5.50%) as the sole distributor, an assembly plant by PT Suzuki Indomobil Motor (4.55%), and a financing company PT Suzuki Finance Indonesia (0.92%).
- Citroën, Jeep, and Leapmotor, with PT Indomobil National Distributor as the distributor.
- Jaguar Land Rover, distributed through PT JLM Auto Indonesia (JV with Inchcape, effectively 28% owned by Indomobil Group, 40% owned by PT Indomobil Jasa Lintas Raya which is 69.99% owned by Indomobil Group).
- Great Wall Motor, distributed through PT Inchcape Indomobil Energi Baru Distribusi (JV with Inchcape, 30% owned by Indomobil Group), and assembled by PT Inchcape Indomobil Manufacturing Indonesia.
- GAC Aion, with PT Aion Indomobil Distribution Indonesia as the distributor. In 2024, Indomobil became the Indonesian distributor for GAC Aion electric vehicles, with local assembly planned in partnership with GAC Aion.
- Changan, with PT Dinamika Indomobil Transportasi as the distributor.
- Maxus, with PT Indomobil Energi Baru as the distributor.
- Hongqi, with PT Hongqi Indomobil Distribution Indonesia as the distributor.

=== Two-wheeled vehicles ===
- Harley-Davidson, distributed through PT JLM Auto Indonesia.
- Indomobil E-Motor, distributed through PT Indomobil Emotor Internasional.

=== Commercial vehicles ===
- Hino, with PT Hino Motors Sales Indonesia (40%) as distributor, an assembly plant owned by PT Hino Motors Manufacturing Indonesia (10%), and a financing company PT Hino Motors Finance Indonesia (36.79%).
- Volvo Trucks and Volvo Buses, distributed through PT Indotruck Utama (74.99%).
- Renault Trucks, distributed through PT Indo Traktor Utama (74.99%).
- Dongfeng, distributed through PT Indo Global Traktor.
- Foton, with PT Indomobil Global Transportasi as the distributor.
- JAC, with PT Indomobil VKTR Transportasi as the distributor.

=== Heavy-duty equipment and machinery ===
- Volvo Construction Equipment and Volvo Penta, distributed through PT Indotruck Utama.
- SDLG, Kalmar Port Equipment (Cargotec), and Manitou Material Handler, distributed through PT Indo Traktor Utama.
- John Deere, Hiab (Cargotec), and Bandit Wood Chipper distributed through PT Wahana Inti Selaras (99.99%).

=== Financial services ===
- IMFI Financial Service, or PT Indomobil Finance (91.98%) a company focus on consumer finance for vehicles purchased from the group.
- Hino Finance, or PT Hino Finance Indonesia, owned 36.79% by the group, while 40% owned by Hino (which owned 50% by Toyota), and 20% by Summit Global Auto Management BV (which 100% owned by Sumitomo Corporation).
- Shinhan Indo Card, or PT Shinhan Indo Finance, a credit card company, owned 49% by Indomobil Group, and 51% by Shinhan Card Co Ltd (affiliate of Shinhan Financial Group).

=== Vehicle rental ===
- Indorent, or PT CSM Corporatama, provide rentals of passenger and commercial vehicles, 91.97% owned by the group.
- Indopenske, or PT Indomobil Bussan Trucking, a joint venture between Indorent (PT CSM Corporatama), Penske Truck Leasing, and Mitsui & Co., Ltd., which provides commercial vehicle rental service.

=== Logistics ===
- PT Seino Indomobil Logistics, a joint venture between Indomobil Group and Seino Holdings Co Ltd, which provide car carriers, trailer transports, fuel transport, refrigerated transports, and other charter transport services.
- Indologi, or PT Indologi Summit Logistics, a joint venture between Indomobil (through Indorent / PT CSM Corporatama) and Sumitomo Corporation. Indologi provides services such as vehicle pre-delivery inspection, vehicle storage area, and maintenance.
- SIP Express, or PT Solusi Indomobil Perkasa, which provides last mile logistics.

=== Contracting Services ===
- Prima Contracting, or PT Prima Sarana Gemilang, a mining and general contractor.

=== Vehicle Parts ===
- Indoparts, or PT Central Sole Agency, that manufactures batteries, engine parts, brake shoe, tires, chain, belts, bearing, suspensions, and other automotive parts.
- Furukawa Battery Indonesia, a joint venture with Furukawa Electric that manufactures batteries.
- Dunlop, or PT Sumi Rubber Indonesia, a joint venture with Sumitomo Rubber Industries which manufactures Dunlop tires.
- PT Sumi Indo Wiring Systems, a joint venture with Sumitomo Wiring Systems, which manufactures wiring harness to be supplied to automotive manufacturers for local and export.
- Indostation, or PT Sentra Trada Indostation, which with ExxonMobil, provides one-stop-service micro gas stations and retail the Mobil petroleum brand.

=== Vehicle Repairs ===
- Autoglad, or PT Indomobil Sompo Jepang, a joint venture with SOMPO Holdings, which provides workshops for automotive body repairs.
- PT Indomobil Ekspres Truk, which operate in the repair and trading for trucks and buses.

=== Assembly, Body Builder and Manufacturing ===
- PT National Assemblers, assembly plant for various brands (99.97%).
- Kyokuto Indonesia, which manufactures and distribute truck attachments such as dump truck, concrete mixer, garbage compactor, and tailgate lifter. The manufacture is performed by PT Kyokuto Indomobil Manufacturing Indonesia and distributed by PT Kyokuto Indomobil Distributor Indonesia, both are joint ventures between Indomobil and Kyokuto Kaihatsu Kogyo Co. Ltd.
- Indomatsumoto & Indomurayama, which provides parts stamping and making dies for automotive parts. PT Indomatsumoto Press & Dies Industries and PT Indomurayama Press & Dies Industries are joint ventures with Matsumoto Industries.

=== Others ===
- PT Indomobil Prima Energi, which distributes ExxonMobil fuel products.
- DAX, or PT Data Arts Experience, a digital agency that specializes in data-based marketing.
- Teach Cast with Oxford, or PT Indomobil Edukasi Utama, which is a collaboration with Oxford University Press to provide technology-based English conversation trainings.

== Previous operations ==
- Autobacs, or PT Autobacs Indomobil Indonesia, a joint venture between Indomobil (through Indoparts / PT Central Sole Agency) with Autobacs Seven, which provided retail accessories and parts for passenger vehicles. In January 2024, both parties ended the partnership.
- Chery, with distribution through PT Unicor Prima Motor, a joint venture founded in 2006 between Indomobil Group and Chery Automobile. In 2013, Chery exited from Indonesian market due to poor sales. The brand re-entered the Indonesian market under direct headquarters control.
- Datsun, which was sold by PT Nissan Motor Indonesia from 2013 until 2020. In 2022, Nissan retired the Datsun marque globally.
- Infiniti, which was sold by PT Nissan Motor Indonesia from 2011 to 2018, due to poor sales.
- Kia, through PT Kreta Indo Artha as the distributor from 2019 until 2025. In January 2026, Kia Corporation taken over the distribution through PT Kia Sales Indonesia.
- Mazda since the 1980s. In 2006, Mazda took over the distribution through PT Mazda Motor Indonesia. In 2017, the distribution rights were given to Eurokars Group.
- Marvia, through PT Marvia Graha Motor.
- Nissan Finance, or PT NFSI Financial Services, prior to April 2023 known as PT Nissan Financial Services Indonesia. The company was acquired by the convenience store chain Indomaret (PT Indomarco Prismatama) the following month and changed its name to PT Indomarco Financial Services.
- Renault, distributed through PT Auto Euro Indonesia from 2001 to 2019, where it was succeeded by Maxindo.
- Ssangyong since the mid-1990s, through PT Indobuana Autoraya.
- Volvo Cars, distributed in Indonesia until 2017, before it was taken over by Garansindo until 2021. In 2022, Volvo appoints PT Leading Vision Otomotif as a distributor.
- Yadea electric motorcycle between 2022 and 2024, through PT Indomobil Emotor Internasional. In January 2025, Yadea taken over the distribution through PT Yadea Distributor Indonesia.
