= Farizon Xingxiang V7E =

Battery electric van

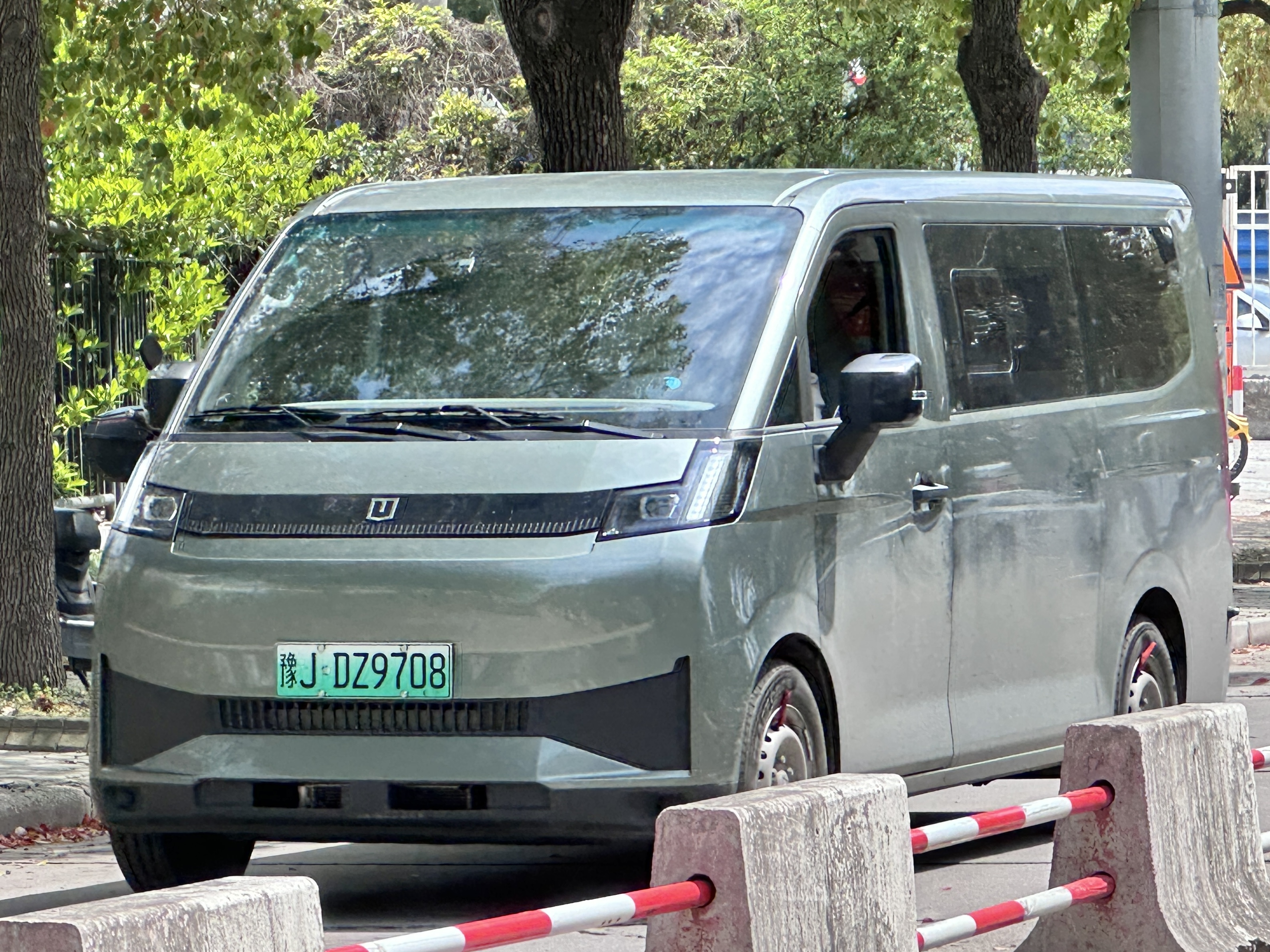

Overview
- Manufacturer: Farizon Auto
- Also called: Farizon Xingxiang V8E (LWB variant); Farizon Xingxiang M7E (passenger van variant)
- Production: 2024–present

Body and chassis
- Class: Light commercial vehicle
- Body style: 5-door van; 2-door pickup truck

The Farizon Xingxiang V7E (Chinese: 远程 星享V7E) is a battery electric van produced by the Chinese automaker Farizon as part of the Xingxiang V series from April 2024, before being updated in July 2025 as an independent model.

== First generation (2024–2025) ==
The Farizon Xingxiang V7E was originally variant of Xingxiang V series, a fully electric van series by Farizon Auto, specially designed for the needs of urban logistics and distribution. At launch, the Farizon Xingxiang V7E is the larger and more premium version of the Farizon Xingxiang V6E featuring a restyled front end. The original Xingxiang V7E was launched in April 2024, and has a range of 305 km.

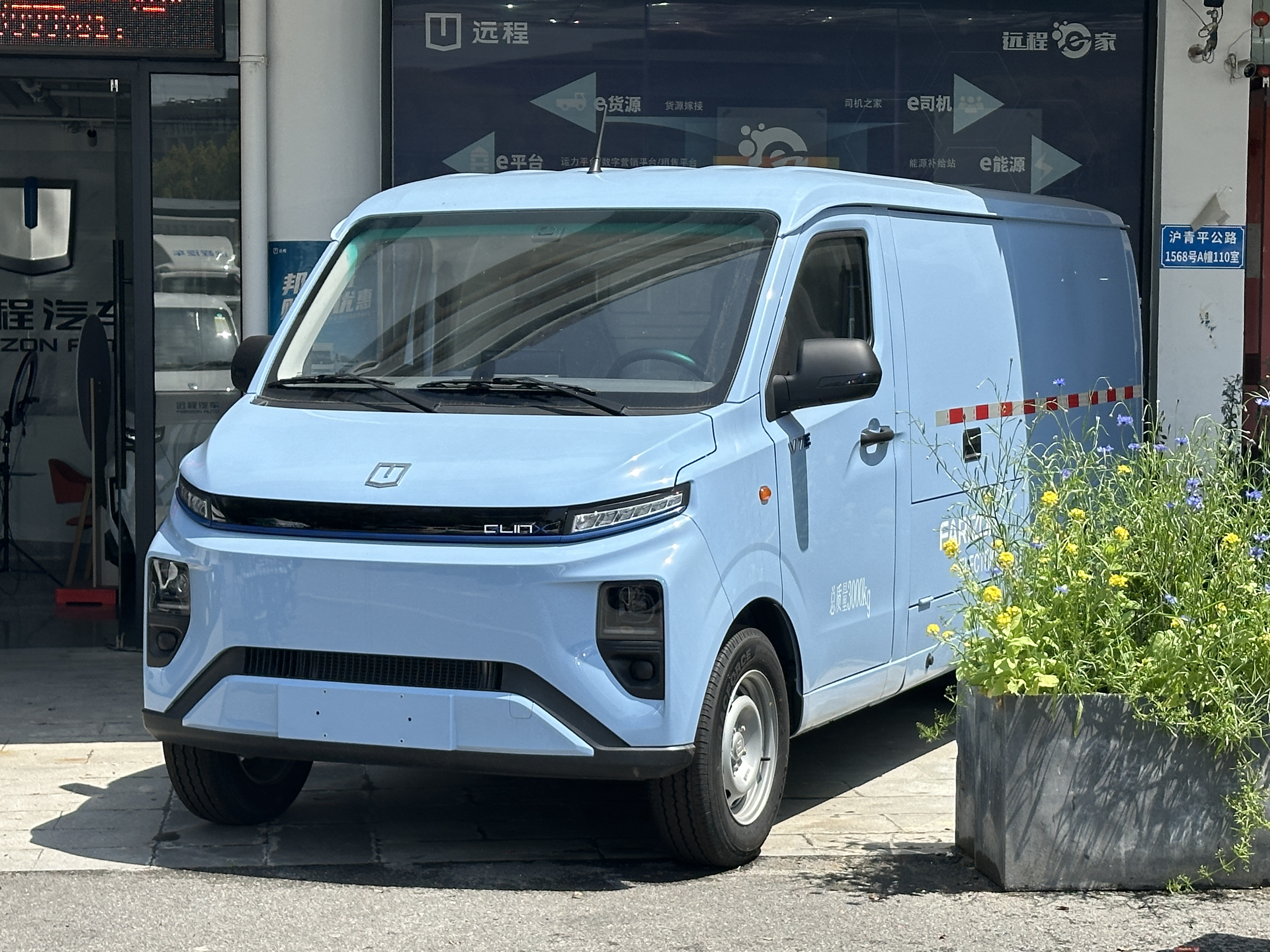
2024 Farizon Xingxiang V7E

== Second generation (2025–present) ==
Second generation
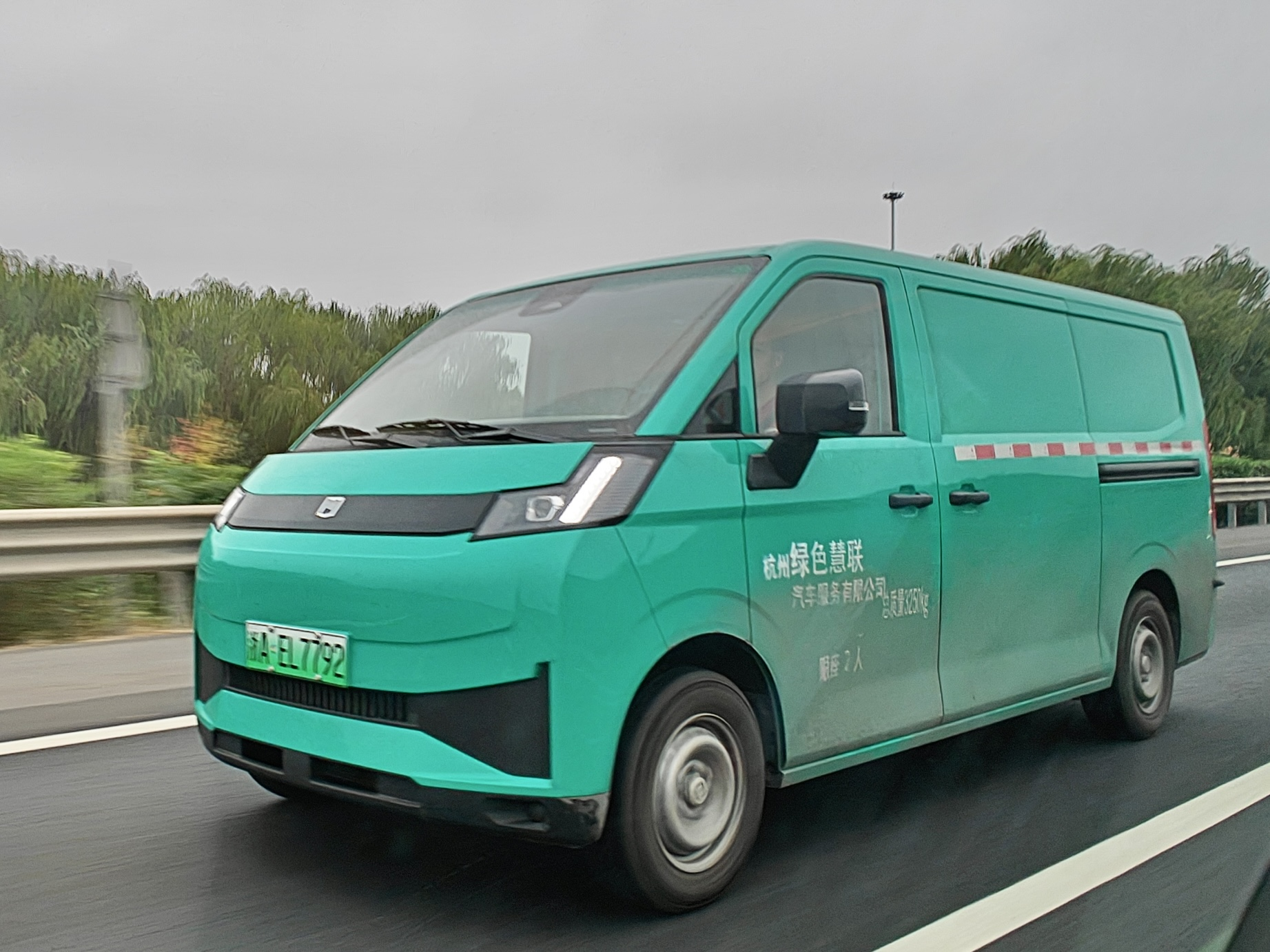
- The Farizon Xingxiang V7E in Hangzhou.

Overview
- Production: 2025–present
- Assembly: China; Indonesia

Body and chassis
- Layout: Front-engine, front-wheel-drive
- Platform: GXA-M intelligent drive-by-wire architecture

Powertrain
- Electric motor: Permanent magnet synchronous

Dimensions
- Wheelbase: 3,200 mm (126.0 in)
- Length: 5,000 mm (196.9 in)
- Width: 1,820 mm (71.7 in)
- Height: 1,985 mm (78.1 in)

Starting from July 2025, the V7E and longer variants such as the Xingxiang V8E was built on Farizon's GXA-M intelligent drive-by-wire architecture and was updated with a completely new design all around to became an independent model. The updated model uses a front positioned electric motor and has a range of 375 km.

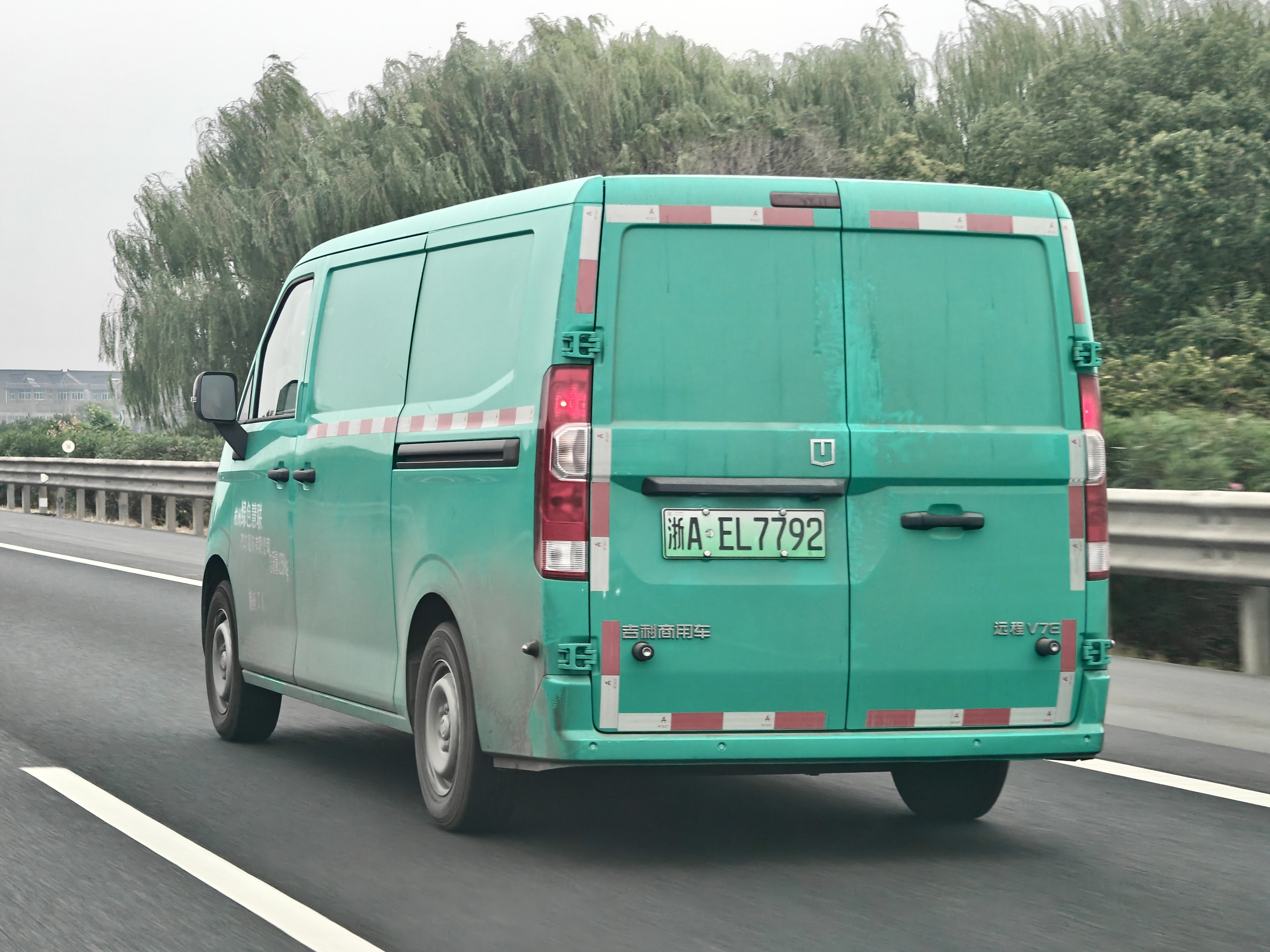
Rear view

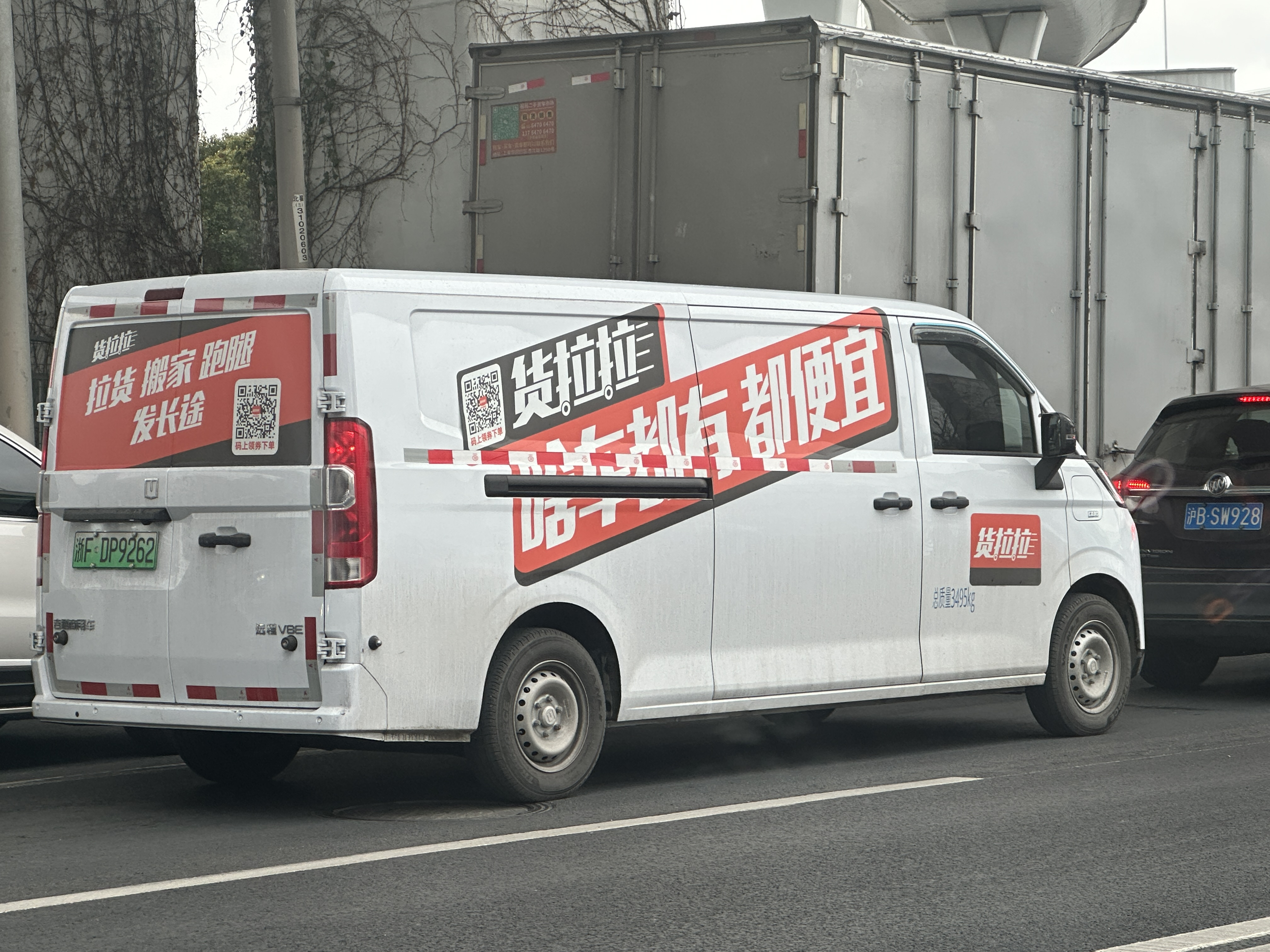
Rear view (V8E)

=== Specifications ===
The Xingxiang V7E is powered by a 90 kW permanent magnet synchronous electric motor positioned over the front axle, with the output of which reaching 122 hp, and 220 Nm of torque. The Xingxiang V7E is equipped with a 51.4 kWh Geely Xuanwu battery designed for commercial electric vehicles, featuring a slim design, liquid-cooled fast charging, and AI-powered energy management. The suspension setup of the updated Xingxiang V7E utilizes MacPherson struts for the front and longitudinal leaf springs for the rear.

=== Farizon Xingxiang M7E ===
Launched in October 2026, the Xingxiang M7E is the passenger van variant of the Xingxiang V7E, sharing the majority of design with the Xingxiang V7E panel van.

=== Farizon Xingzhi F3E ===
The Xingxiang V7E has a truck variant called the Xingzhi F3E (星智F3E), sharing the cab with the 2025 Xingxiang V7E van.

Farizon Xingzhi F3E
