= Mazda Motor Indonesia =

Defunct Indonesian automotive company

- Type: Subsidiary
- Industry: Automotive
- Founded: 1985 (As PT. National Motor/NM, joint venture with Indomobil Group); 2006 (As PT. Mazda Motor Indonesia/MMI)
- Defunct: February 1, 2017
- Fate: Defunct, operations assumed by Eurokars Motor Indonesia
- Headquarters: Jakarta, Indonesia
- Area served: Indonesia
- Products: Automobiles
- Parent: Mazda Motor Corporation of Japan
- Website: mazda.co.id

PT. Mazda Motor Indonesia was an official distributor company of the Mazda Motor Corporation from 2006 to 2017.

== History ==
Mazda Motor Indonesia began operating in 2006 after being founded on April 27, 2006. Located in Jakarta, Indonesia, it was preceded by the former joint venture between the Mazda Motor Corporation and the Indomobil Group, PT. National Motors. The new successor to PT. National Motors was PT. Mazda Motor Indonesia, which was directly owned by Mazda Motor Corporation. The manufacturing company and joint venture with Indomobil Group was founded in 1985 and discontinued in 1997. The PA monthly production of approximately 1,500 units were planned.

It once built two different Mazda Familia based car models. By 2015, the main profit of the company came majorly from the Mazda CX-5 (48%) and Mazda2 (32%).

In 2016, the company closed down, and Eurokars Motor Indonesia was appointed as Mazda's new official agent in Indonesia, establishing the new company (unrelated to Mazda Motor Indonesia) Mazda Indonesia in 2017. When Eurokars Motor Indonesia took on Mazda Motor Indonesia's operations, employees were rehired and integrated rather than replaced.

On February 1, 2017, the distribution of Mazda vehicles were taken over by Eurokars Group, announced on October 14, 2016.

== Former models ==
- Mazda 323 (1977-1980)
- Mazda MR90 (1990–1993)
- Mazda Baby Boomer (1993–1995)
- Mazda Vantrend (1992–1997)
- Mazda 626 (1987–1992)
- Mazda 323 (1989–1994)
- Mazda Cronos (1992–1997)
- Mazda Lantis (1994–1997)
- Mazda E2000 (1996–2005)
- Mazda Familia (1997–2000)
- Mazda Premacy (2000–2005)
- Mazda MPV (2000–2003)
- Mazda 323 Protegé (2003)
- Mazda B2500 (2003–2007)
- Mazda Tribute (2002–2008)
- Mazda5 (2007–2010)
- Mazda CX-7 (2007–2012)
- Mazda8 (2011–2016)
- Mazda Biante (2012–2018)
- Mazda VX-1 (2013–2017)
- Mazda BT-50 (2007–2019)
