= Garuda Mataram Motor =

Company of Indonesia

PT Garuda Mataram Motor (GMM) is an Indonesian distributor of Volkswagen and Audi. It was founded in 1998 as a joint venture between the Volkswagen Group and the Indomobil Group. PT National Assembler acts as a knock down car assembly plant for GMM.

The units which have been assembled in Indonesia can be identified by a J on the eleventh position of the Vehicle Identification Number.
