= Toyota South Africa Motors =

South African automotive manufacturer

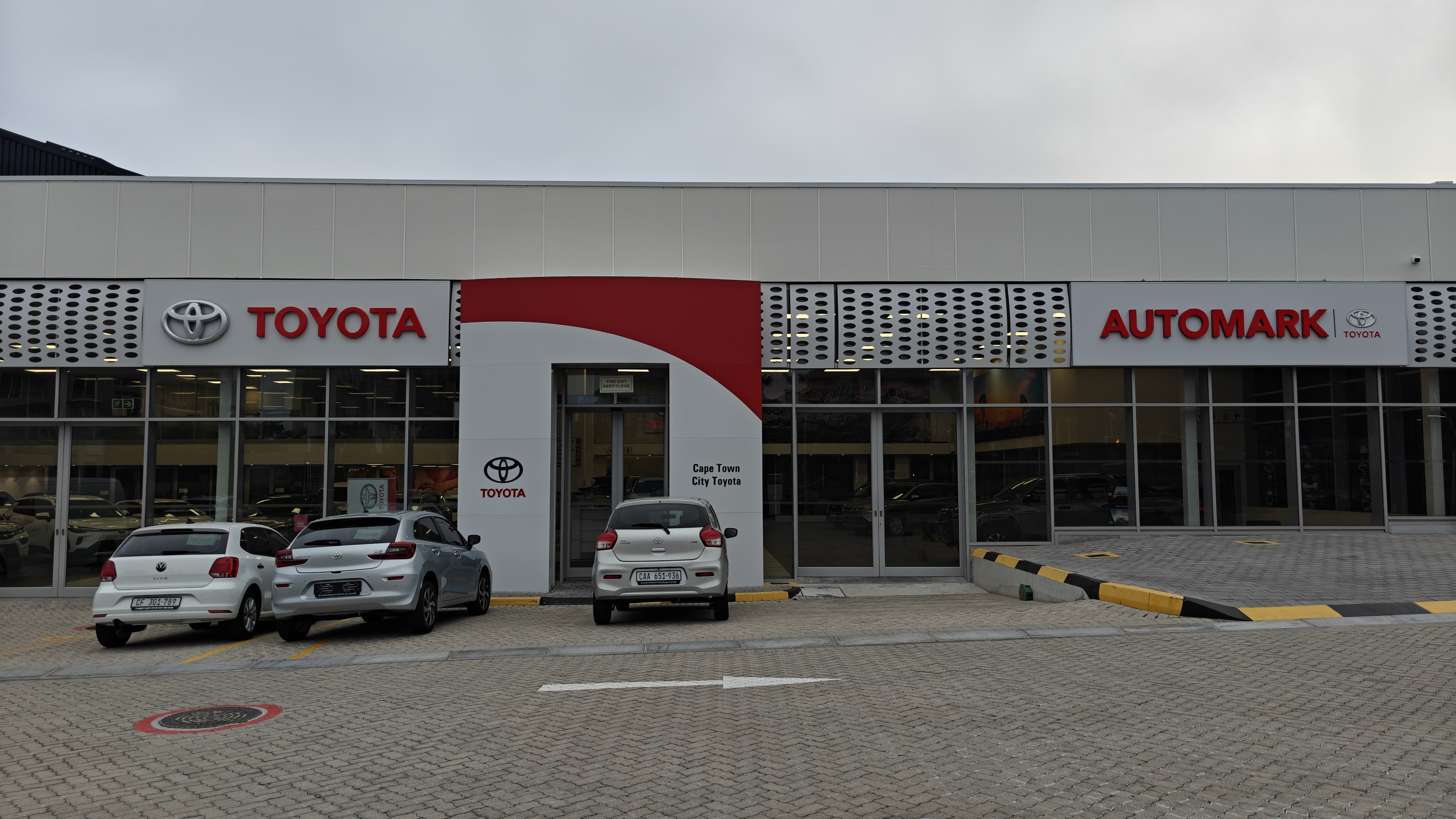
- Toyota Cape Town City dealership
- Type: Subsidiary
- Industry: Automotive
- Founded: 1961; 65 years ago
- Founder: Albert Wessels
- Headquarters: Prospecton, KwaZulu-Natal, South Africa
- Area served: Worldwide
- Key people: Andrew Kibry (President and CEO)
- Products: Passenger vehicles Commercial vehicles
- Parent: Toyota Motor Corporation
- Website: toyota.co.za

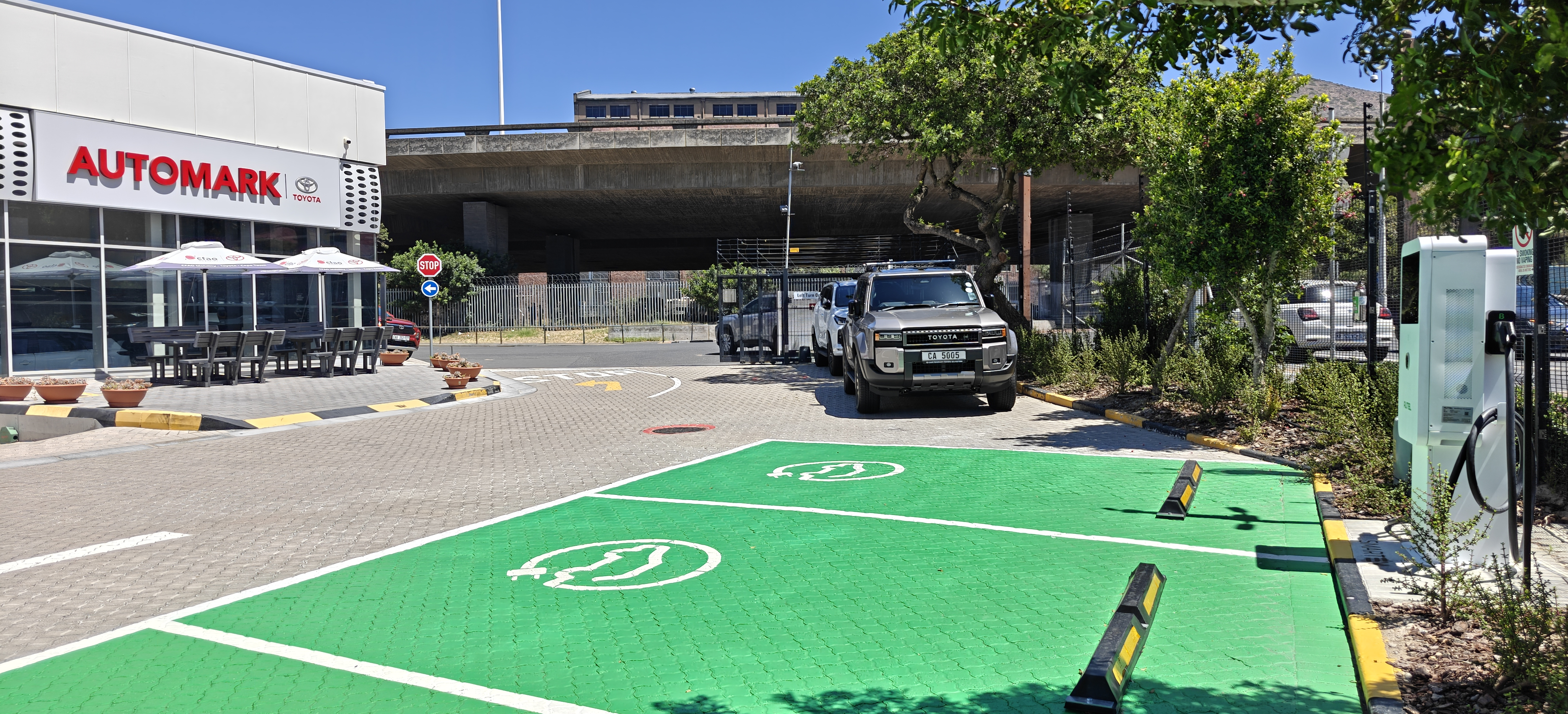
Newly-built EV charging stations at the Toyota Cape Town City dealership

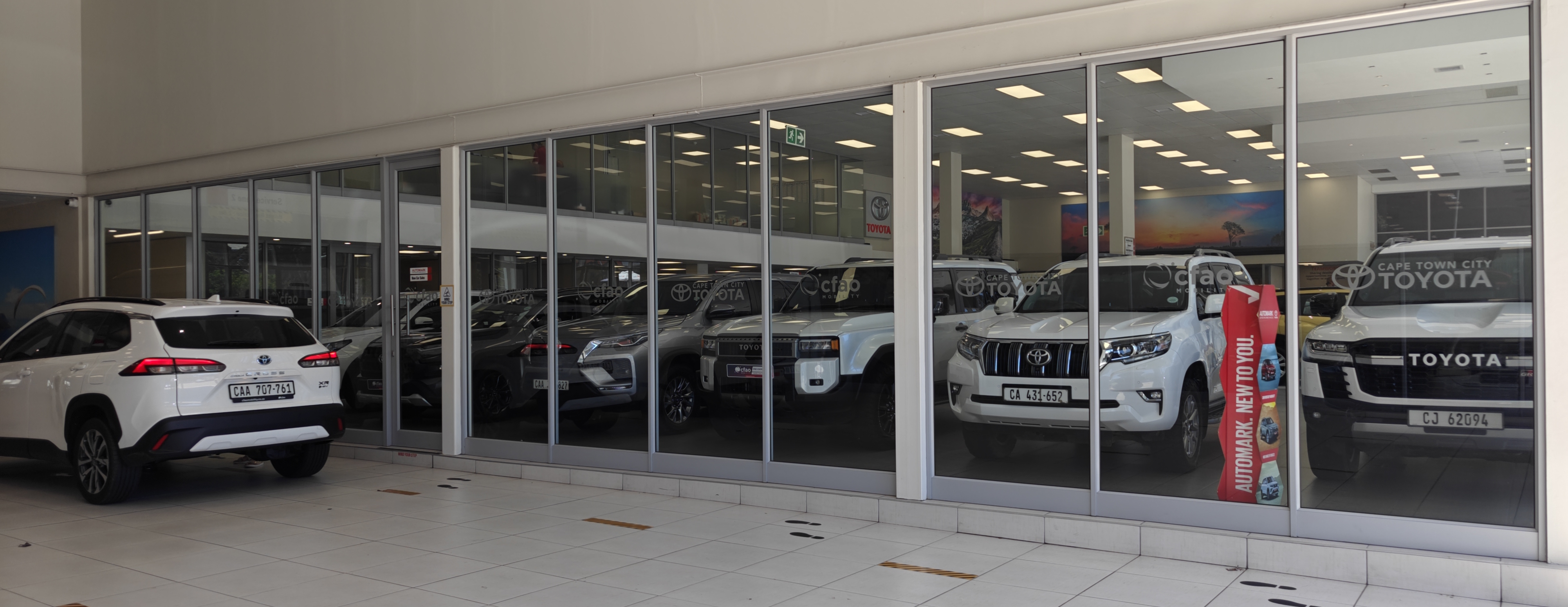
Toyota SUVs in Cape Town, including the new-to-market Land Cruiser J300 (right) and Land Cruiser Prado J200 (third from right)

Toyota South Africa Motors (TSAM) is a South African automobile manufacturer. A wholly-owned subsidiary of Japanese automotive company Toyota, TSAM is based in Prospecton, in KwaZulu-Natal, where its manufacturing facilities are also located.

As of 2026, TSAM manufactures the Hilux, Fortuner, and Corolla Cross passenger vehicles, as well as the Hiace commercial van, for domestic and export markets.

== History ==
In 1959, the first Toyota model, a Land Cruiser, was exported to South Africa.

Toyota South Africa was founded in 1961 by South African businessman and industrialist Albert Wessels, who secured the rights to officially distribute Toyota vehicles in the country. That year, Wessels imported ten Toyota Stout pickup trucks from Japan, establishing the company's initial commercial operations. He subsequently expanded the business into local vehicle assembly and manufacturing.

Production of Toyota models at Motor Assemblies began in 1962 or 1963. At the end of 1964, the sales organisation Toyota SA, which had been founded three years earlier, took over the majority of Motor Assemblies.

In 1978, TSAM finally acquired 100% of the shares in Motor Assemblies.

The Japanese Toyota Motor Corporation initially acquired 27.8% of the shares in TSAM in 1996, increased this share to 75% in 2002 and finally to 100% in 2009.

In 2006, Toyota SA surpassed BMW South Africa as the country's largest automobile exporter.

In 2014, Toyota had 8,500 employees in South Africa.

In December 2025, Toyota's locally-assembled Corolla Cross ranked as the best-selling passenger vehicle in SA, and it has ranked among the top 10 best-sellers numerous times since.

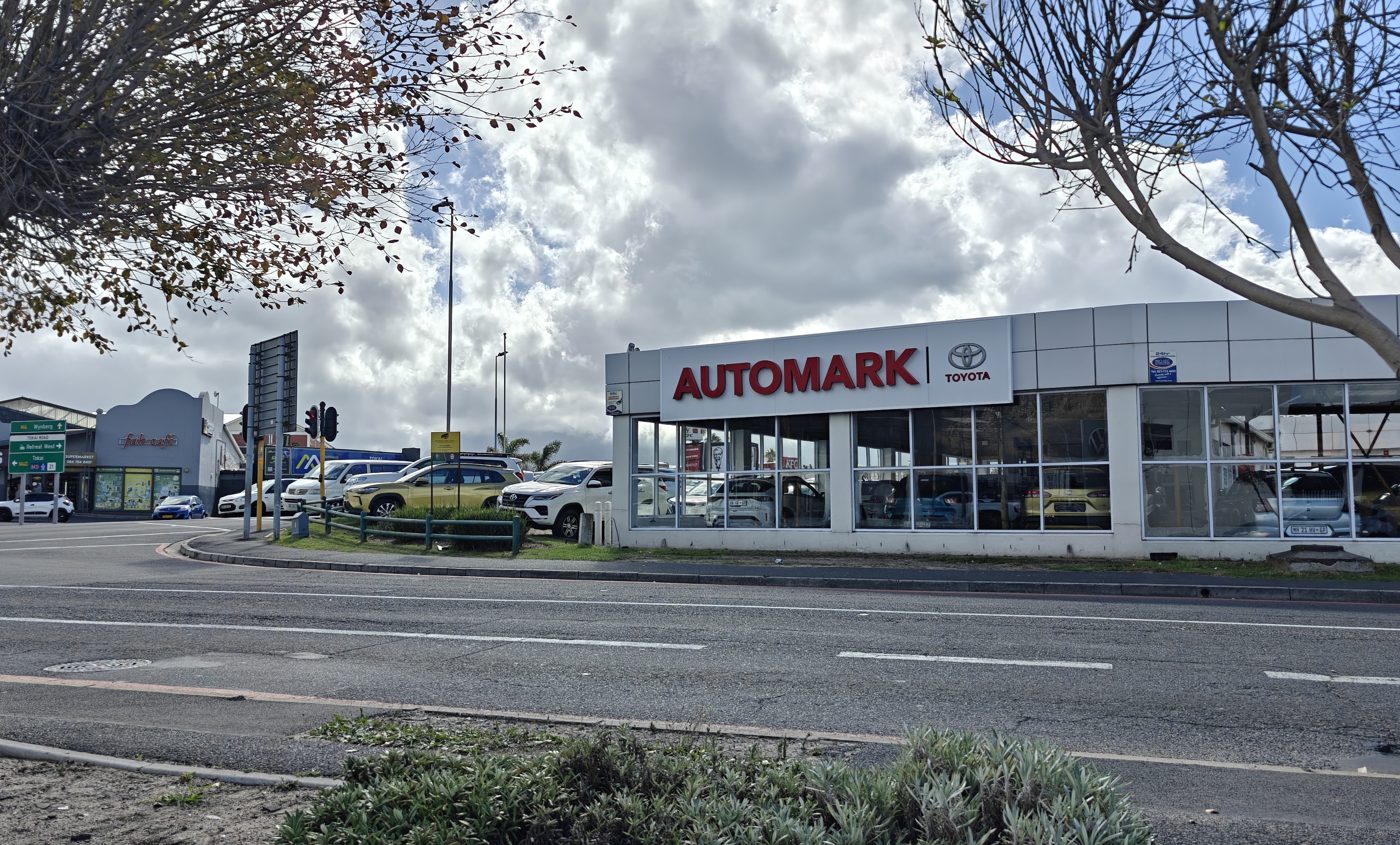
Toyota Automark dealership in Tokai, Cape Town

In July 2026, Toyota SA celebrated the launch of local manufacturing for its 9th generation Hilux. South African President Cyril Ramaphosa gave a virtual address. Toyota SA's CEO said the R10.4 billion invested into the new Hilux's SA manufacturing represented the company's single largest product investment in the company's history.

The investment included R3.2 billion in three new major manufacturing facilities - a Toyota Logistics Center, a Chassis Frame Coating Facility, and a Chassis Frame Welding Facility. Other parts of the overall investment went directly into Hilux production preparation, TSAM operations, and the company's South African supplier network.

== Models ==
At Motor Assemblies, Toyota platform trucks such as the Toyopet Stout were initially produced. From 1966, the Corona was also produced, which is the first passenger car produced under the Toyota brand. In November 1966, the engine production began.

The Hilux has been manufactured in South Africa since 1970, and Hino commercial vehicles have also been produced since 1974. In May 1975, the production of the Corolla began.

The following models manufactured by TSAM are also exported: the Corolla to Australia since 2003 and Europe since 2007 and the Hilux pick-up to Europe and the rest of Africa since 2005.

With the Toyota Conquest or Tazz, TSAM followed a similar approach (long construction time of an outdated model, relatively little model maintenance) to Volkswagen with the Citi Golf and Nissan South Africa with the Nissan 1400. The model was sold as the Conquest from 1986 and the Tazz from 1996 to 2006. But from 1996 to 2006, 207,169 units of the TSAM Tazz have been sold and it was the market leader in its class in this period of eight out of eleven years. Successors of the smaller Tazz are the Aygo and the Etios.

The one millionth Corolla was manufactured in South Africa in 2013.

In 2014, the Hilux, Fortuner, all Hino models and Ses'fikile taxis were produced from kits at the Toyota plant in Prospecton near Durban.

In Q4 2021, Toyota started assembling the Corolla Cross in South Africa.

In Q2 2026, TSAM began manufacturing the 9th generation Hilux at improved facilities in South Africa.

=== Current production lineup ===
Image	Model	Category	Variants	Markets	SA manufacturing established	Ref
Passenger vehicles
	Corolla Cross	Compact crossover	1.8 Xi, 1.8 XS, 1.8 XS HEV, 1.8 XR, 1.8 GR-S, 1.8 XR HEV, 1.8 GR-S HEV	Domestic; exports to Africa and other international markets	2021; 5 years ago	
Toyota Fortuner in Milnerton, Cape Town	Fortuner	Midsize SUV	2.4 GD-6, 2.8 GD-6, 2.8 GD-6 VX, 2.8 GD-6 GR-S; 4×2 and 4×4	Domestic; exports to Africa and other international markets	2005; 21 years ago	
	Hilux	Pickup truck	Single Cab, Xtra Cab, Double Cab	Domestic; exports to Africa, Europe, and other international markets	1970; 56 years ago	
Commercial vehicles
	Hiace	Minibus	Ses'fikile	Domestic; exports to African and other international markets	2015; 11 years ago	

== See also ==
- Automotive industry in South Africa
- Manufacturing in South Africa
