= Metair Investments =

South African automotive holding company

Metair Investments Limited
- Type: Public
- Traded as: JSE: MTA; A2X:MTA
- ISIN: ZAE000090692
- Industry: Automotive components
- Founded: 1948; 78 years ago
- Founder: Albert Wessels
- Headquarters: Johannesburg, Gauteng, South Africa
- Area served: Southern Africa and Europe
- Key people: Thandeka Mgoduso (Chairperson); Paul O'Flaherty (CEO); Alastair Walker (CFO)
- Products: Automotive parts
- Brands: AutoZone; QSV; MOVE; ATE; First Battery
- Revenue: ▲ R17.87 billion (2025)
- Operating income: ▼ R362 million (2025)
- Net income: ▲ −R393 million (2025)
- Total assets: ▲ R12.58 billion (2025)
- Total equity: ▼ R2.26 billion (2025)
- Number of employees: 13,116 (2025)
- Divisions: Auto Parts Manufacturing; Aftermarket Parts and Retail
- Subsidiaries: AutoZone Holdings; Hesto Harnesses; Smiths Manufacturing; Lumotech; Automould; Supreme Spring; Unitrade; Rombat
- Website: metair.co.za

Metair Investments is a South African automotive holding company, founded in 1948. The company has operations primarily in South Africa and Romania.

Listed on the JSE and based in Johannesburg, Gauteng, the company operates through subsidiaries involved in the manufacturing, distribution, and retail of automotive components, batteries, and aftermarket parts.

== History ==
Metair Investments was established in 1948 by South African businessman and industrialist Albert Wessels. The company initially formed part of the Wessels family's industrial interests, which later included Toyota South Africa, also founded by Albert Wessels.

In 1964, Metair began manufacturing automotive components for Toyota, subsequently expanding its operations to supply other vehicle manufacturers in South Africa, including BMW, Ford, Mercedes-Benz, and Volkswagen.

In 2006, the Wessels family began divesting its interests in Metair, with Coronation Capital and Royal Bafokeng Holdings acquiring significant shareholdings. The company subsequently pursued a diversification strategy intended to reduce its dependence on Toyota and the South African automotive manufacturing industry. By 2012, it had substantially expanded its customer base and increased its exposure to automotive batteries and aftermarket components.

In 2012, Metair acquired Romanian battery manufacturer Rombat, marking its entry into international battery manufacturing. In December 2013, it acquired Turkey's largest battery manufacturer, Mutlu Akü, for approximately R2.9 billion. The acquisitions significantly expanded Metair's international operations and made it one of the largest automotive battery manufacturers in EMEA. The company subsequently pursued the development of advanced batteries for vehicles equipped with start-stop systems.

During the late 2010s and early 2020s, Metair expanded its automotive component manufacturing activities in South Africa. In 2020, it secured major supply contracts with Ford Motor Company, prompting investment in additional manufacturing capacity, including a new wiring harness facility in KwaZulu-Natal. However, the company increasingly faced financial and operational challenges arising from disruptions to automotive production, rising debt, and deteriorating economic conditions in Turkey.

In February 2024, Paul O'Flaherty became the company's CEO, as it undertook a financial and operational restructuring. In December 2024, Metair disposed of its Turkish subsidiary Mutlu Akü to American company Quexco. The disposal represented a significant reversal of its earlier international expansion strategy.

Also in December 2024, Metair acquired South African automotive parts retailer AutoZone, which had entered business rescue earlier that year. The acquisition formed part of a strategic shift toward automotive aftermarket distribution and retail, reducing the company's dependence on original equipment manufacturing. During 2025, Metair refinanced its debt and consolidated Hesto Harnesses into its financial reporting following changes to its control of the business.

In January 2026, Metair established a consolidated aftermarket parts and retail division, bringing together AutoZone, MOVE, ATE, First Battery, and QSV. In March, the company reported a €20.2 million penalty imposed by the European Commission on its Romanian subsidiary Rombat for historical automotive battery pricing practices. Metair appealed the penalty, maintaining that the conduct preceded its acquisition of Rombat. In May, the company completed the refinancing of R3.3 billion in debt as part of its broader restructuring program.

In August 2026, Metair reported that it had completed its two-and-a-half-year restructuring program, with improved financial performance and a renewed focus on automotive component manufacturing and aftermarket parts distribution.

== Operations ==
As of 2026, Metair Investments has subsidiaries and majority shareholdings including:

Company	Automotive sector	Established	Location	Shareholding	Ref
Alfred Teves Brake Systems	Braking systems and components	2004; 22 years ago	Johannesburg, Gauteng, South Africa	100%	
Auto Plastics	Plastic component manufacturing	1997; 29 years ago	Pinetown, KwaZulu-Natal, South Africa.	100%	
Automould	Plastic injection molding and surface finishing	1979; 47 years ago	New Germany, KwaZulu-Natal, South Africa	100%	
AutoZone	Aftermarket parts retail and distribution	1999; 27 years ago	Johannesburg, Gauteng, South Africa	100%	
Dynamic Battery Services	Battery distribution (auto and industrial)	1993; 33 years ago	Skelmersdale, Lancashire, United Kingdom	100%	
First National Battery Retail	Battery retail and distribution	2002; 24 years ago	Benoni, Gauteng, South Africa	100%	
Hesto Harnesses	Electronic components and wiring harnesses	1989; 37 years ago	KwaDukuza, KwaZulu-Natal, South Africa	74.9%	
Lumotech	Plastic components and lighting	1957; 69 years ago	Kariega, Eastern Cape South Africa	100%	
Rombat	Battery manufacturing	1980; 46 years ago	Bistrița, Romania	99.4%	
Smiths Manufacturing	Electrical systems, climate control, and cooling	1962; 64 years ago	New Germany, KwaZulu-Natal South Africa	75%	
Unitrade 745	Cable and wire manufacturing	1970; 56 years ago	KwaDukuza, KwaZulu-Natal, South Africa	100%	

== See also ==
- Automotive industry in South Africa
- Manufacturing in South Africa
