= AutoZone (South Africa) =

South African auto parts retailer

- Type: Subsidiary
- Industry: Automotive aftermarket Retail
- Incorporated: 2014; 12 years ago
- Founded: 1996; 30 years ago
- Headquarters: Johannesburg, Gauteng, South Africa
- Number of locations: 213 (2025)
- Area served: Southern Africa
- Key people: Graeme Stanley (Managing Director)
- Products: Auto parts Lubricants; Vehicle accessories Tools
- Brands: AutoKraft; TomiHawk; FEMO; AFO; Tackies; Elpar
- Owner: Metair Investments (since 2024)
- Number of employees: 1,380 (2025; AutoZone and QSV)
- Parent: Metair Investments
- Website: autozone.co.za

AutoZone is a South African auto parts retailer. Founded in 1996 and based in Johannesburg, Gauteng, the company has been a wholly owned subsidiary of holding company Metair Investments since 2024.

As of 2026, the company operates 213 locations across four Southern African countries. The majority of its outlets are situated in South Africa.

== History ==
AutoZone traces its origins to a group of South African automotive parts businesses acquired and consolidated during the late 1980s and early 1990s. In 1996, automotive components manufacturer Federal-Mogul combined several businesses, including Femo, Fast Parts, and QSV, under the AutoZone brand. The business was subsequently acquired by Super Group, through Chariot Holdings, becoming part of its automotive distribution operations.

In June 2010, Super Group sold AutoZone to a consortium comprising RMB Corvest, Zico Capital, and company management for R435 million. At the time, AutoZone operated 11 wholesale branches, 82 company-owned retail stores, and 50 franchised outlets, with operations extending into Namibia and Botswana.

In January 2015, private equity firm Ethos announced the acquisition of a controlling interest in AutoZone through its Ethos Fund VI. By then, AutoZone had expanded to 151 company-owned retail and wholesale branches and 37 franchised outlets across Southern Africa.

During the early 2020s, AutoZone experienced growing financial difficulties attributed to weak economic conditions and increasing debt servicing obligations. In July 2024, the company entered voluntary business rescue proceedings after its lender, Absa, declined to extend its debt facilities. At the time, AutoZone employed approximately 1,450 people and operated around 190 retail and wholesale locations across South Africa.

In October 2024, South African automotive holding company Metair Investments agreed to acquire AutoZone for approximately R290 million as part of the business rescue process. The transaction was completed on 13 December 2024 through Metair subsidiary Nikisize, which wholly acquired AutoZone Holdings. The acquisition involved settling secured and unsecured creditor claims and providing additional working capital, while giving Metair an established automotive aftermarket retail and distribution network.

In January 2026, Metair announced the establishment of a consolidated aftermarket parts and retail division that incorporated AutoZone, MOVE, ATE, First Battery, and QSV. The restructuring was intended to integrate the group's retail and distribution operations and reduce its dependence on automotive original equipment manufacturing.

== Operations ==
As of 2026, AutoZone operates 213 stores across South Africa, Namibia, Botswana, and Eswatini. The majority of its outlets are situated in its home country, with most of those located in Gauteng.

== See also ==
- Automotive industry in South Africa
- Retailing in South Africa
