= Nissan Livina =

Compact MPV model from Nissan

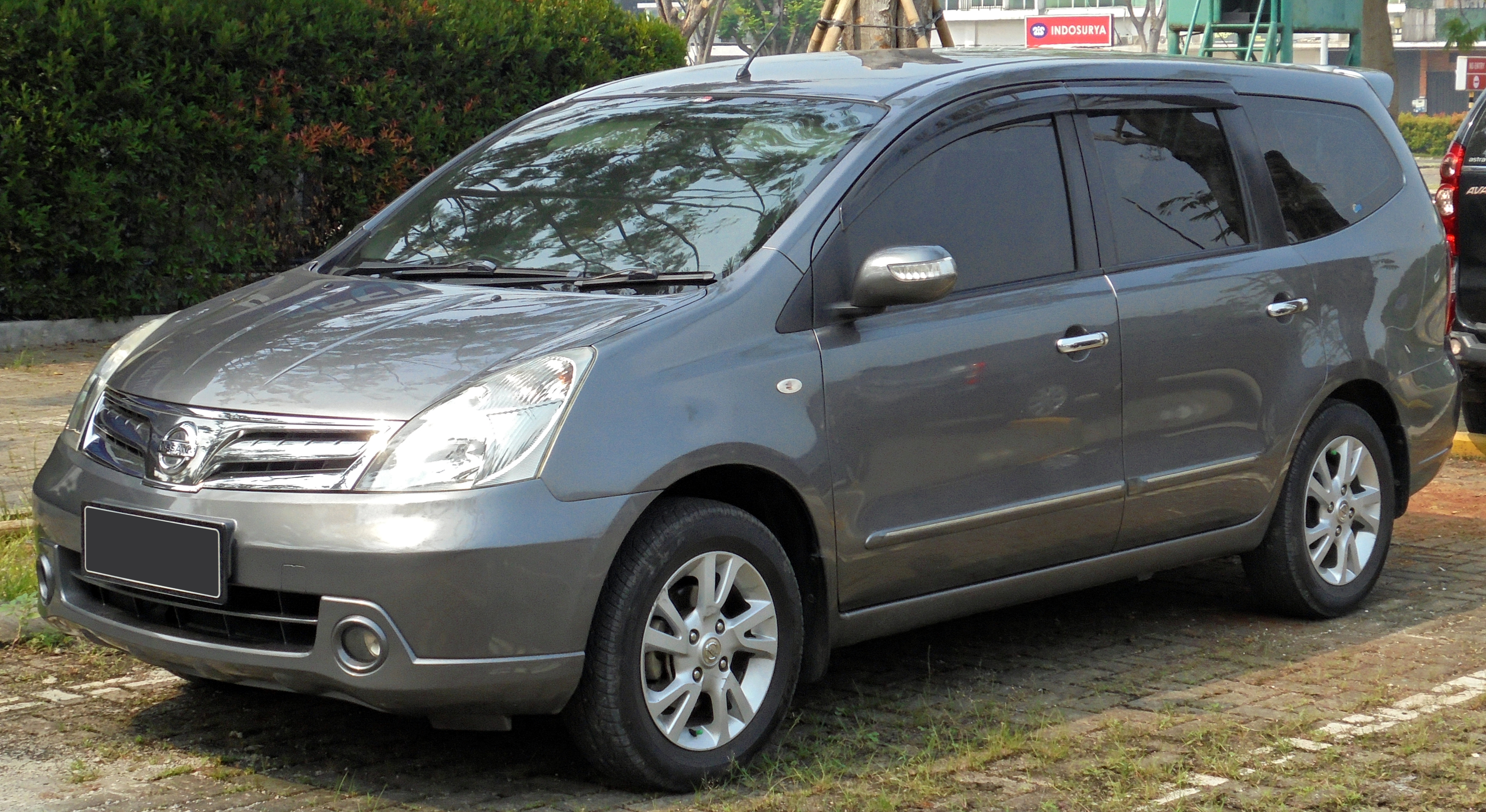
- Nissan Grand Livina 1.5 Ultimate (L10; 1st facelift, Indonesia)

Overview
- Manufacturer: Nissan (first generation); Mitsubishi Motors (second generation)
- Also called: Mitsubishi Xpander (2019–present)
- Production: December 2006 – present

Body and chassis
- Class: Mini MPV (two-row models); Compact MPV (three-row models)
- Layout: Front-engine, front-wheel-drive

The Nissan Livina is a compact MPV model produced by the Japanese automobile manufacturer Nissan. It was introduced in July 2006 by Dongfeng Nissan at the Guangzhou International Motor Show and went on sale in December 2006. Sharing the same platform with the first-generation Note, the first-generation Livina was the first Nissan vehicle to debut in China before being released in other countries.

The first-generation Livina was available in two body lengths, with the longer one designed to accommodate three-row seating. It was built in Brazil, Malaysia, Indonesia, Philippines, Vietnam, South Africa, China and Taiwan. The second-generation Livina that was introduced in February 2019 is a three-row-only model based on the Mitsubishi Xpander, and as of 2022, is only available in Indonesia and the Philippines.

== First generation (L10/L11; 2006) ==
First generation
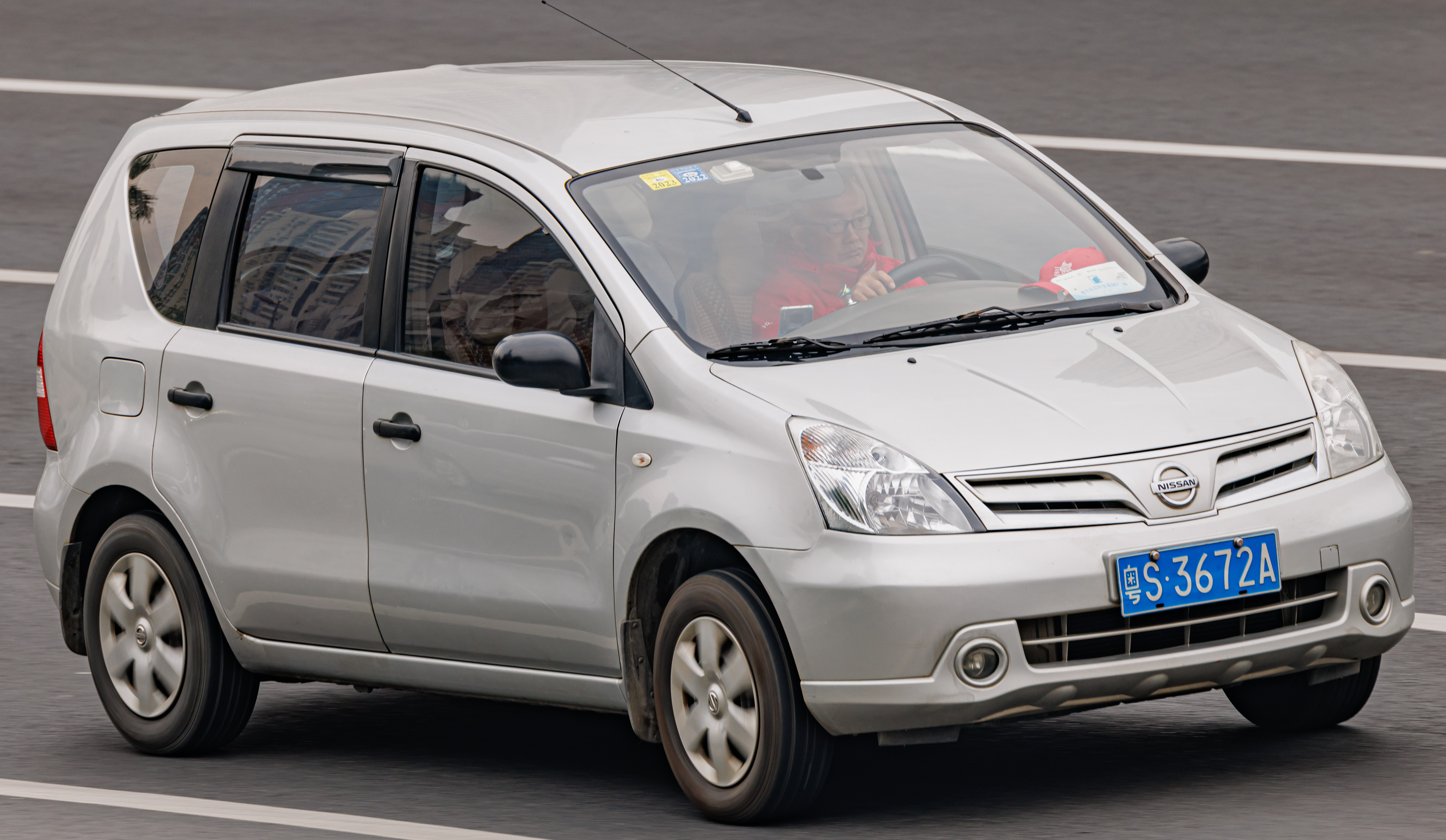
- Livina (L10; facelift, China)

Overview
- Model code: L10 (pre-facelift); L11 (2013 facelift)
- Also called: Nissan Grand Livina (three-row)
- Production: 2006–2018 (China); 2007–2019 (Indonesia); 2007–2020 (Taiwan); 2009–2015 (Brazil); 2007–2018 (Malaysia)
- Assembly: China: Guangzhou (Dongfeng Nissan); Taiwan: Miaoli (Yulon-Nissan); Indonesia: Purwakarta (NMI); Malaysia: Serendah (TCMA); Philippines: Santa Rosa City, Laguna; Vietnam: Hòa Bình (VMC); South Africa: Rosslyn (NSA); Brazil: São José dos Pinhais
- Designer: Seiji Watanabe

Body and chassis
- Body style: 5-door hatchback (two-row models); 5-door wagon (three-row models)
- Platform: Nissan B platform
- Related: Nissan Note (E11); Nissan Tiida/Latio/Versa (C11); Nissan AD/Wingroad (Y12); Nissan Sylphy (G11)

Powertrain
- Engine: Petrol: 1.5 L HR15DE I4; 1.6 L HR16DE I4; 1.8 L MR18DE I4
- Power output: 80 kW (107 hp; 109 PS) (1.5 L); 77–82 kW (103–110 hp; 105–111 PS) (1.6 L); 93 kW (125 hp; 126 PS) (1.8 L)
- Transmission: 5-speed manual; 6-speed manual (1.8 L); 4-speed automatic; CVT (L11 only)

Dimensions
- Wheelbase: 2,600 mm (102.4 in)
- Length: 4,180 mm (164.6 in) (Livina, L10); 4,255 mm (167.5 in) (Livina, L11); 4,310 mm (169.7 in) (Livina X-Gear, L11); 4,420 mm (174.0 in) (Livina Geniss/Grand Livina, L10); 4,485 mm (176.6 in) (Grand Livina, L11); 4,540 mm (178.7 in) (Grand Livina X-Gear, L11)
- Width: 1,690 mm (66.5 in) (L10); 1,700 mm (66.9 in) (Livina/Grand Livina, L11); 1,735 mm (68.3 in) (Livina/Grand Livina X-Gear, L11)
- Height: 1,590 mm (62.6 in) (Livina/Grand Livina, L10/L11); 1,630 mm (64.2 in) (Livina X-Gear, L11); 1,650 mm (65.0 in) (Grand Livina X-Gear, L11)
- Curb weight: 1,117 kg (2,463 lb)

Chronology
- Successor: Nissan Kicks (Livina C-Gear/X-Gear)

=== L10 (2006) ===
The regular length two-row model with a shorter rear overhang is called the Livina or Livina XR, or in Taiwan as Livina Urban or Livina Sport, while the extended length three-row model with a longer rear overhang is called Livina Geniss in China or Grand Livina elsewhere. The longer three-row model is a station wagon-styled MPV, while the two-row model is considered as a roomy hatchback or a European-style mini MPV.

The model debuted in November 2006 in China in its three-row guise under the name Livina Geniss, while the two-row model was introduced in the country in April 2007.

The two-row Livina was introduced in Taiwan in October 2007. Both the two-row Livina and the three-row Grand Livina was also produced in South Africa since January 2008, where forty percent of the vehicle parts were locally sourced, with the rest coming elsewhere, mainly Indonesia.

Power for the Livina comes from 1.5-litre, 1.6-litre or 1.8-litre four-cylinder engines that are shared with the Tiida/Latio/Versa (C11). The 1.5- and 1.6-litre engines are paired with either a 5-speed manual or 4-speed automatic. The 1.8-litre option is paired with either a 6-speed manual or 4-speed automatic transmission.

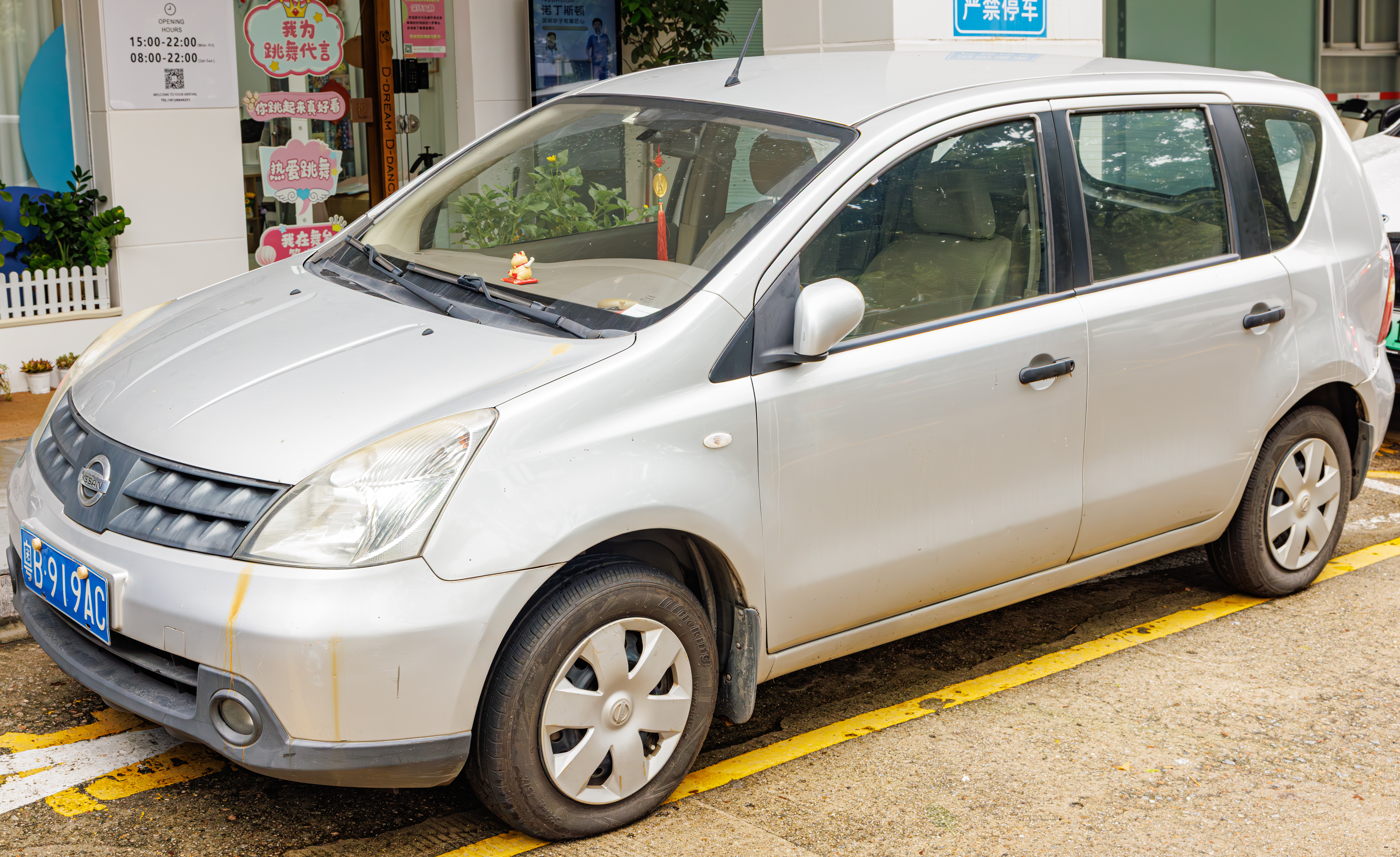
Front View (L10)

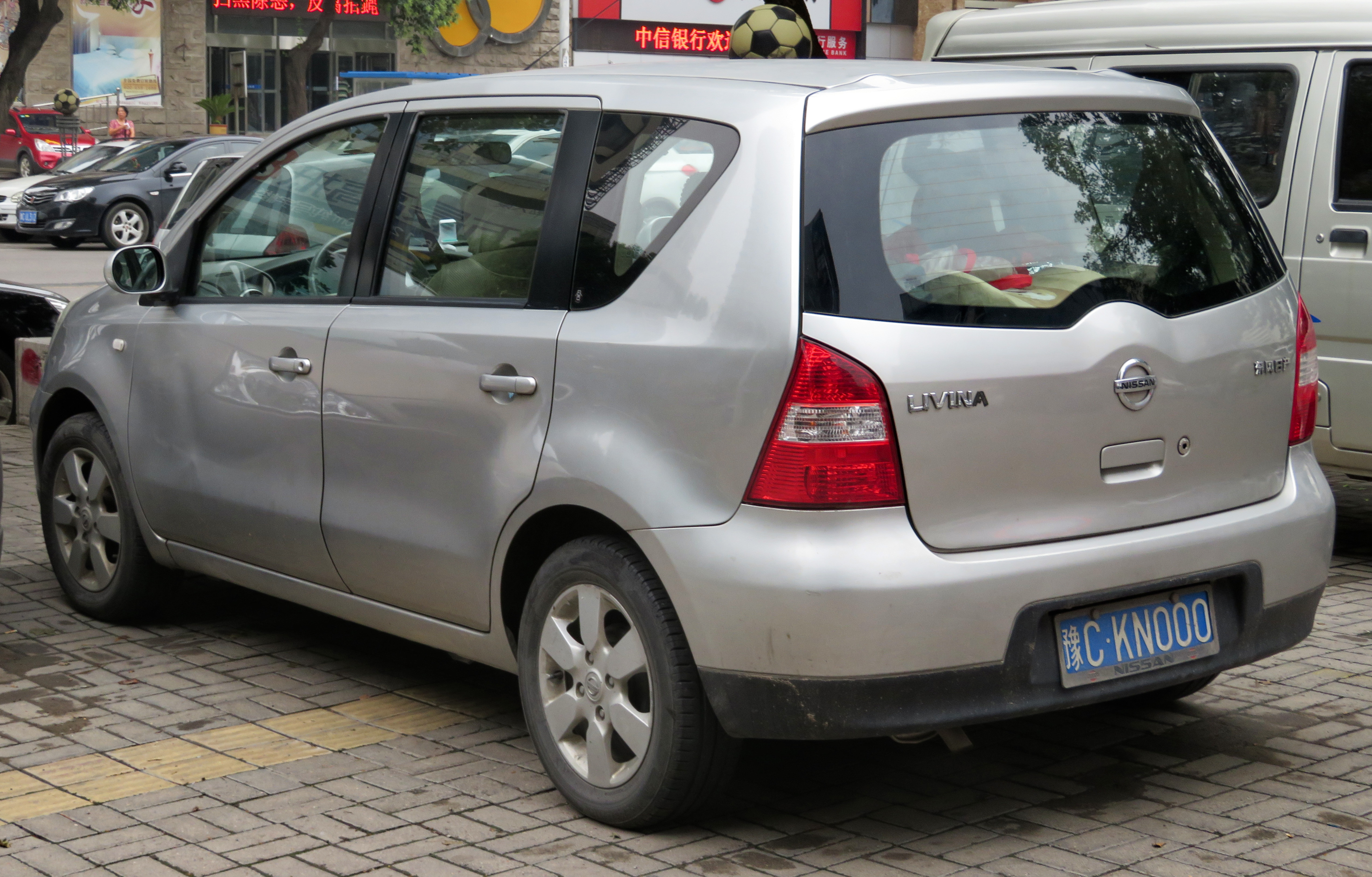
Rear view (L10)

==== Livina Geniss / Grand Livina ====
The Livina Geniss in China or Grand Livina in other countries is a three-row model with longer rear overhang. The Grand Livina was launched in Indonesia on April 5, 2007. It was initially available in 1.5 SV, 1.5 XV, 1.8 XV and 1.8 Ultimate grade levels. Later, the 1.5 S and 1.5 Ultimate, as well as the sporty 1.5 and 1.8 Highway Star with body kit were added into the lineup. The Indonesian market Grand Livina received its facelift on February 10, 2011, while the Highway Star Autech was launched on September 27, 2011 with redesigned grille and bumper. On August 31, 2012, the 1.5 XV and 1.5 Ultimate grades received the same grille and bumper as the Highway Star Autech.

Only the 1.8-litre engine is offered in the Philippines and Brazil, while the South African market get the 1.6-litre variant.

In Malaysia, the Grand Livina was launched in December 2007 with two engine options: HR16DE (manual and automatic) and MR18DE (automatic only). A "Tuned by Impul" edition was made available in January 2009. In June 2011, the facelifted variants was launched. Changes included: new front grille, black dashboard opposed to beige and instrument faces finished in white opposed to black. Later the same month, the "Tuned by Impul" version was updated. In July 2012, an "Autech" variant was introduced.

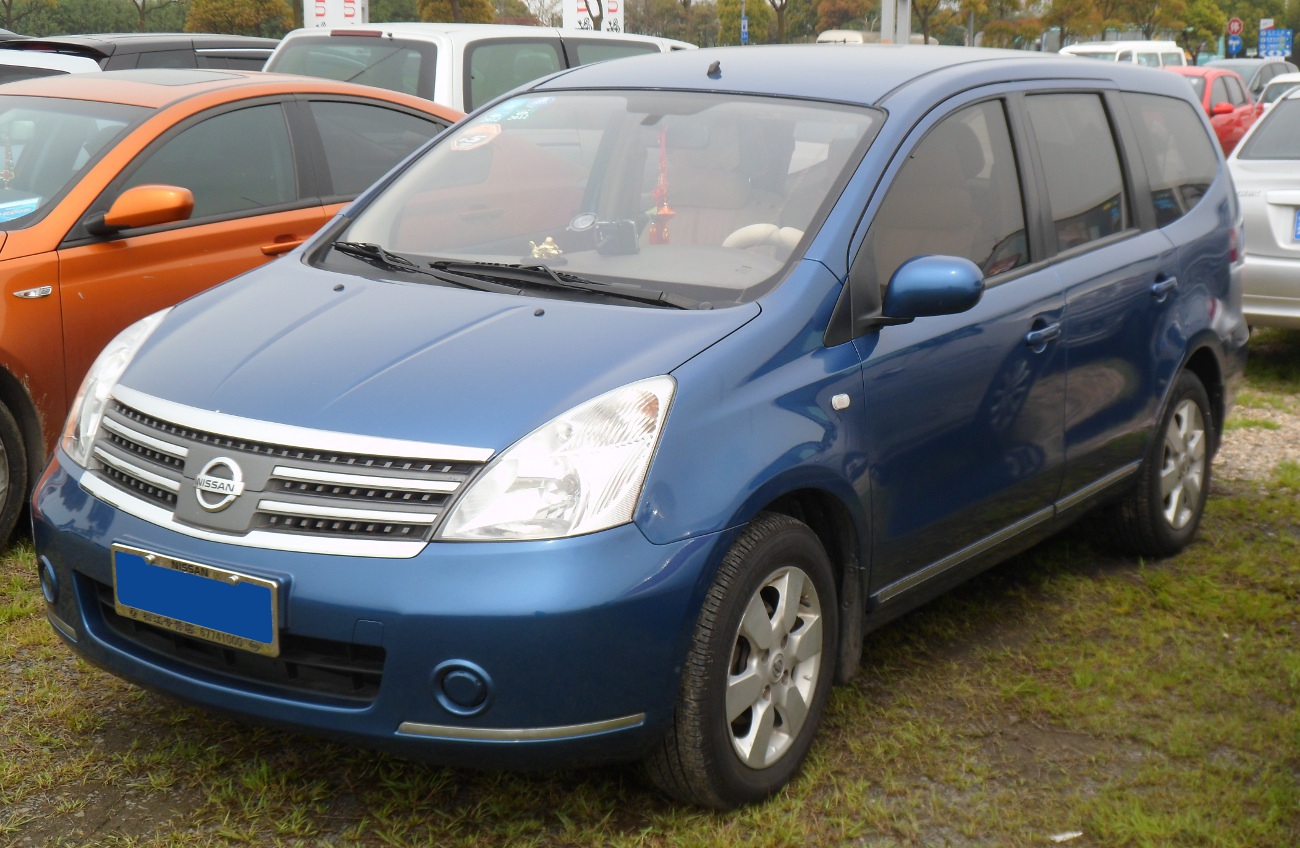
Livina Geniss (L10; pre-facelift, China)

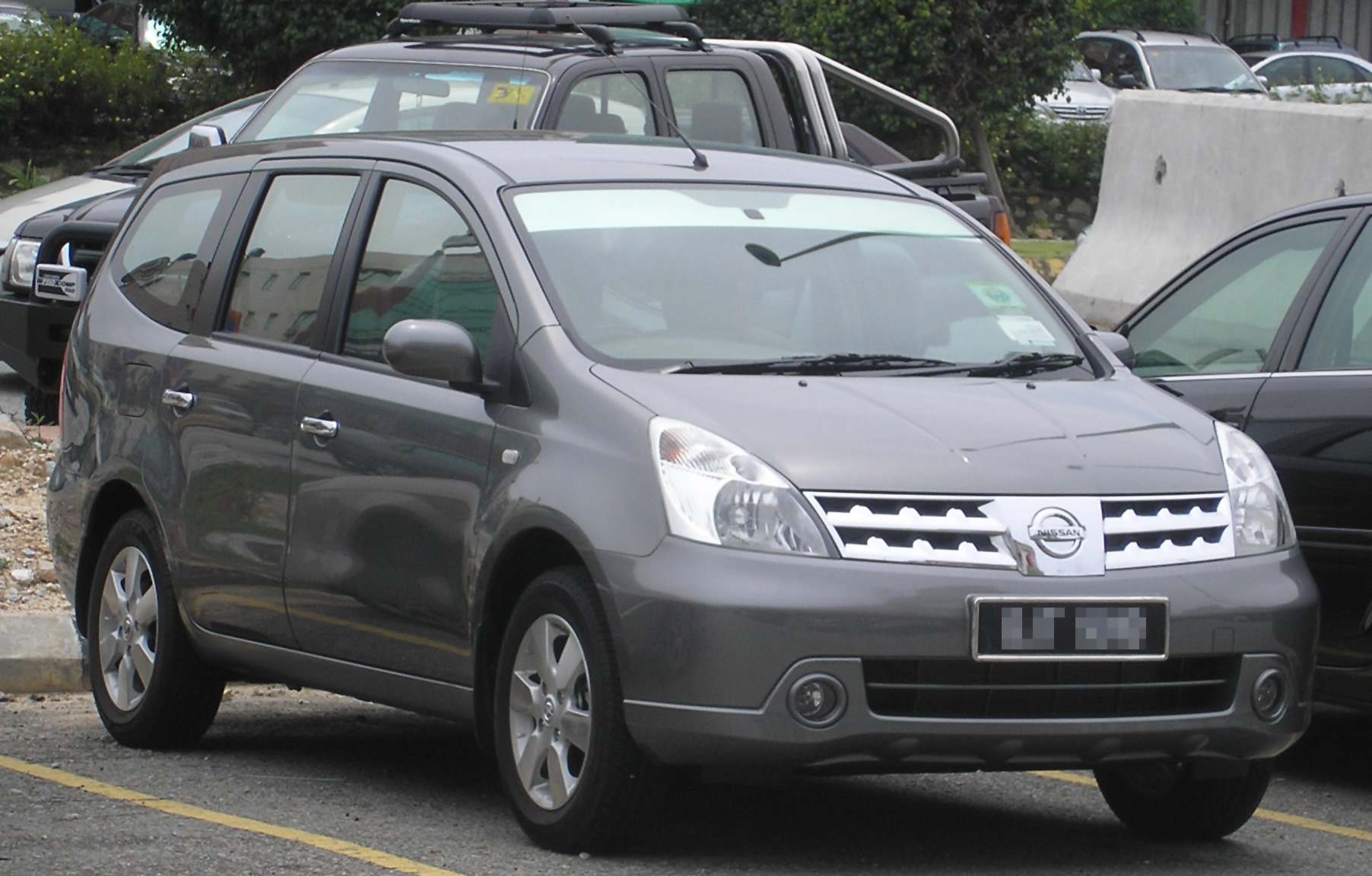
2008 Grand Livina 1.8 (L10; pre-facelift, Malaysia)

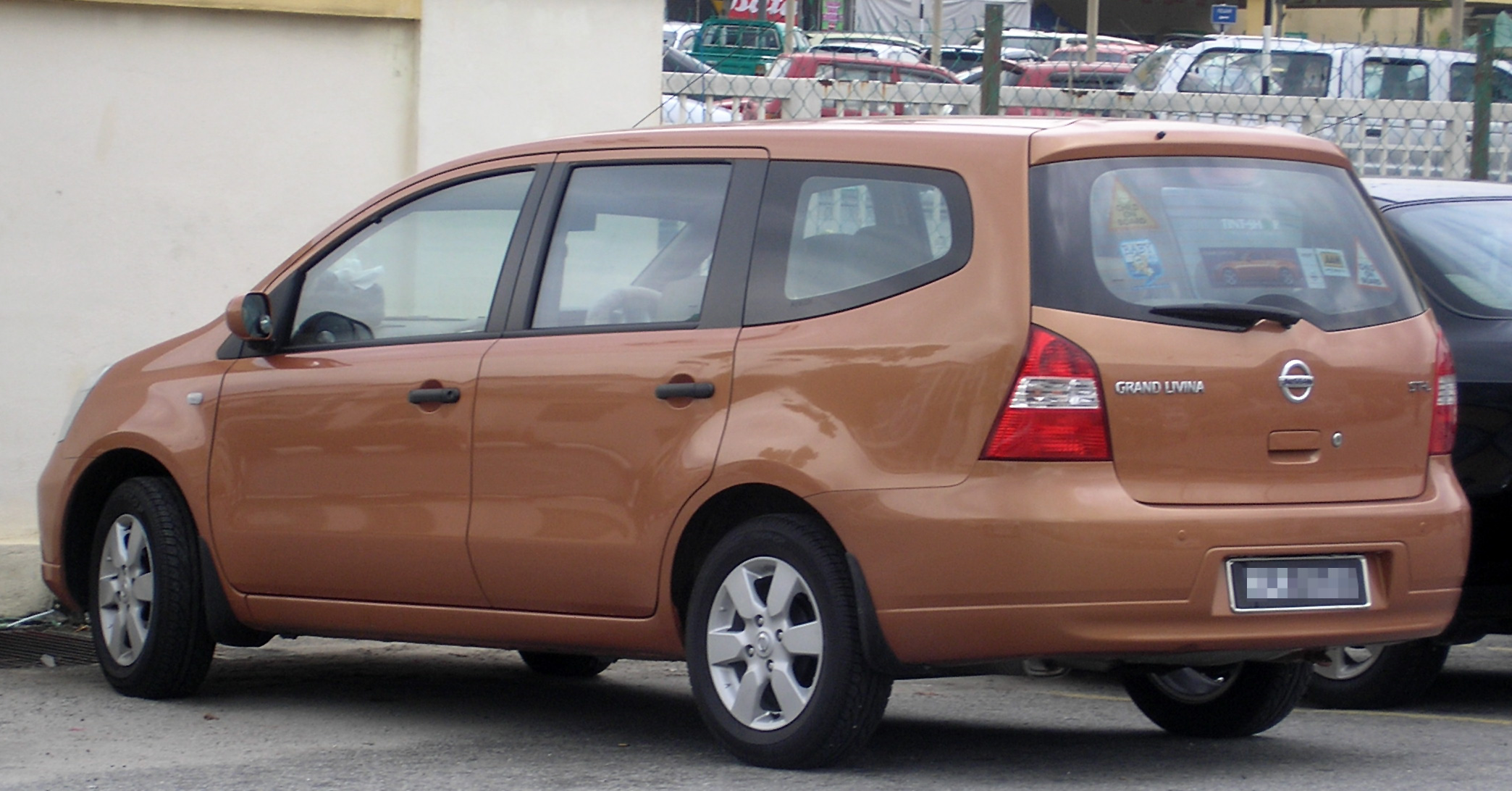
2008 Grand Livina 1.6 ST-L (L10; pre-facelift, Malaysia)

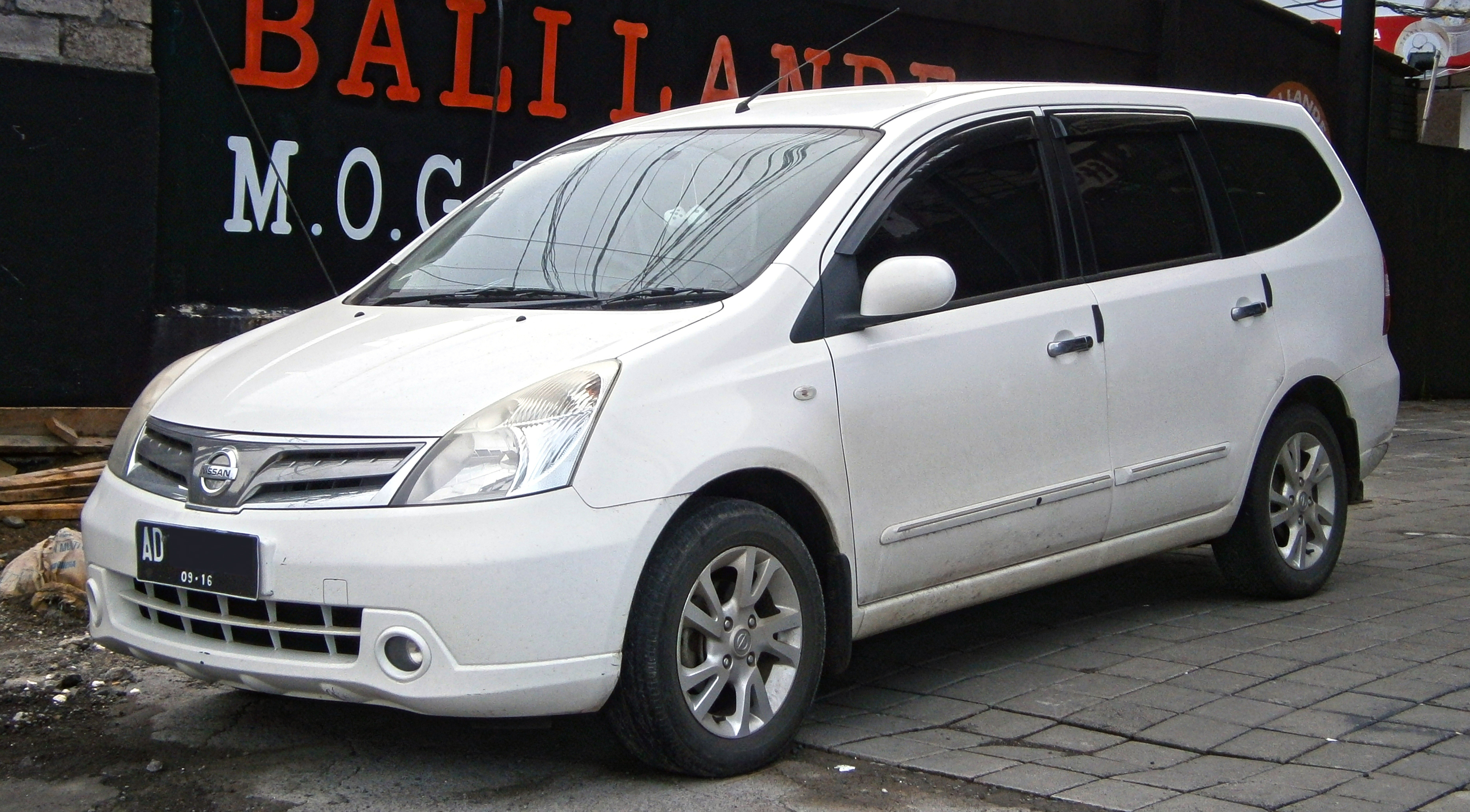
2011 Grand Livina 1.5 XV (L10; 1st facelift, Indonesia)

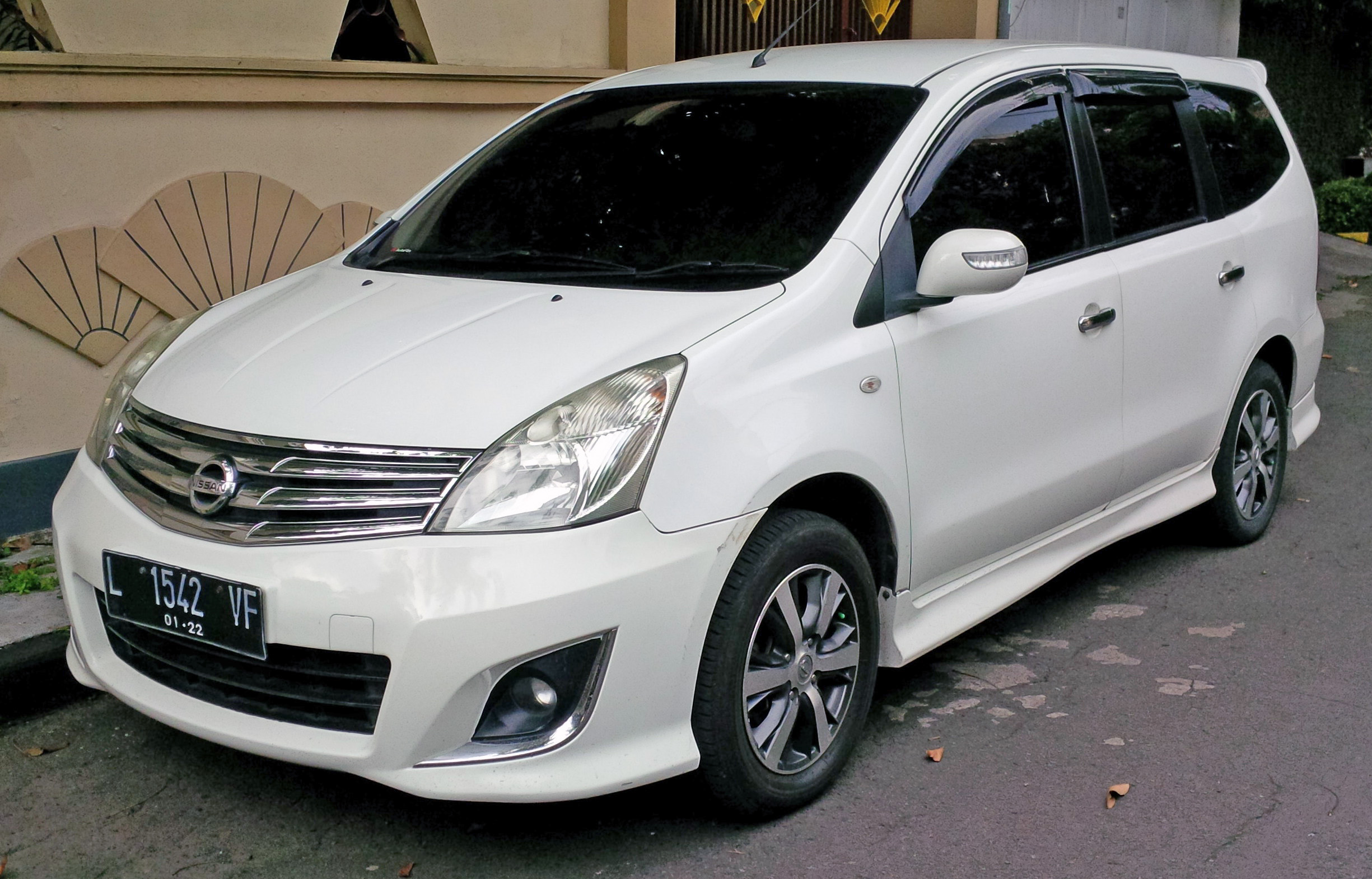
2012 Grand Livina 1.5 Highway Star (L10; 1st facelift, Indonesia)

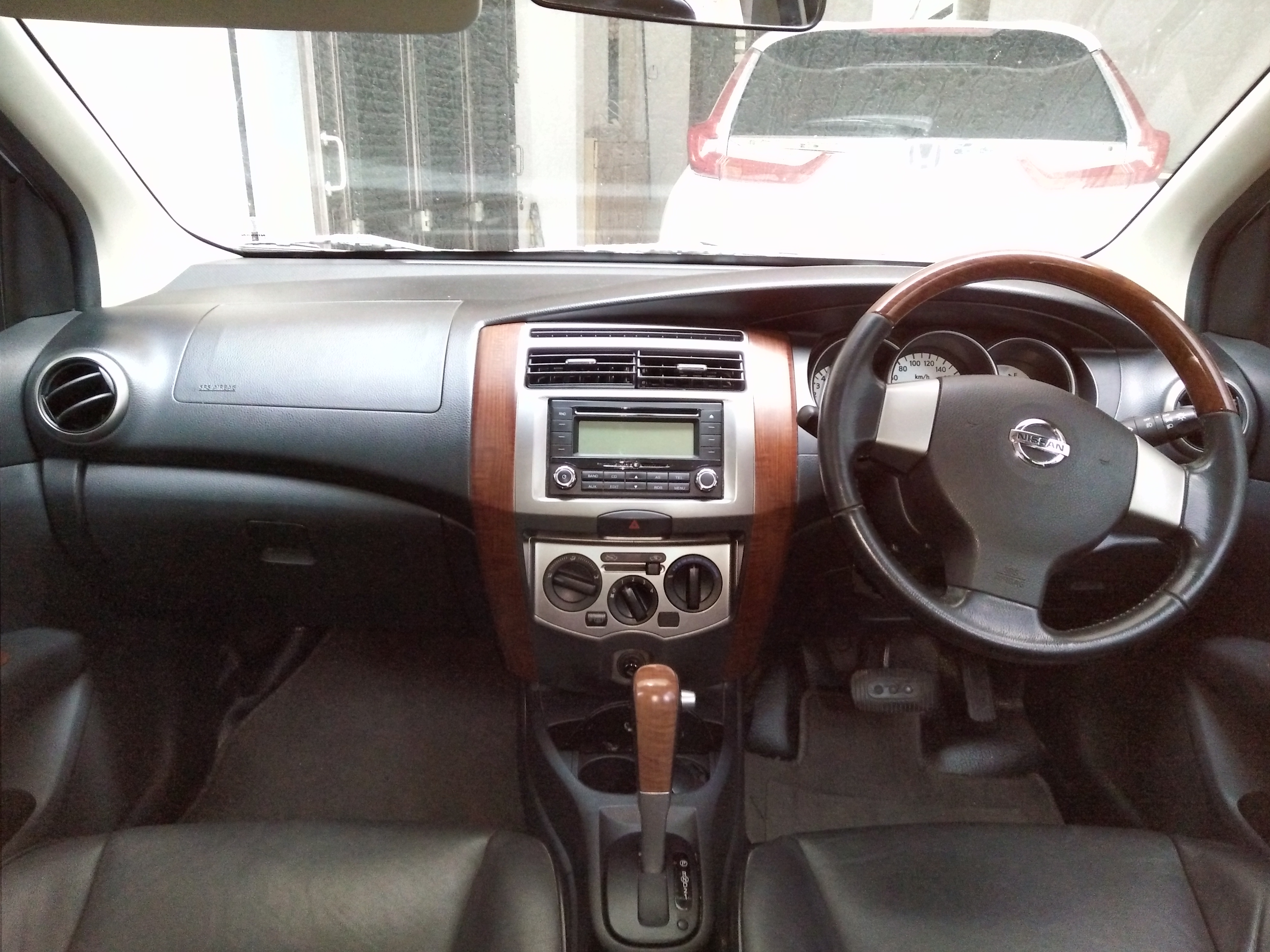
2013 Grand Livina 1.5 Ultimate interior (1st facelift, Indonesia)

==== Livina X-Gear/C-Gear ====
In April 2008, a crossover-styled variant was released as the Livina C-Gear in China. It is marketed as the Livina X-Gear elsewhere. Based on the regular two-row Livina, the X-Gear is decorated with unpainted body claddings, side body garnish, rugged-style bumpers and roof rails. The Livina X-Gear was also introduced in Indonesia in May 2008, in South Africa in 2008, in Brazil in August 2009, and in Malaysia in September 2011.

The variant is powered by a 1.6-litre HR16DE engine, except in Indonesia where it is equipped with a 1.5-litre HR15DE engine. In Brazil, a 1.8-litre engine option was also offered.

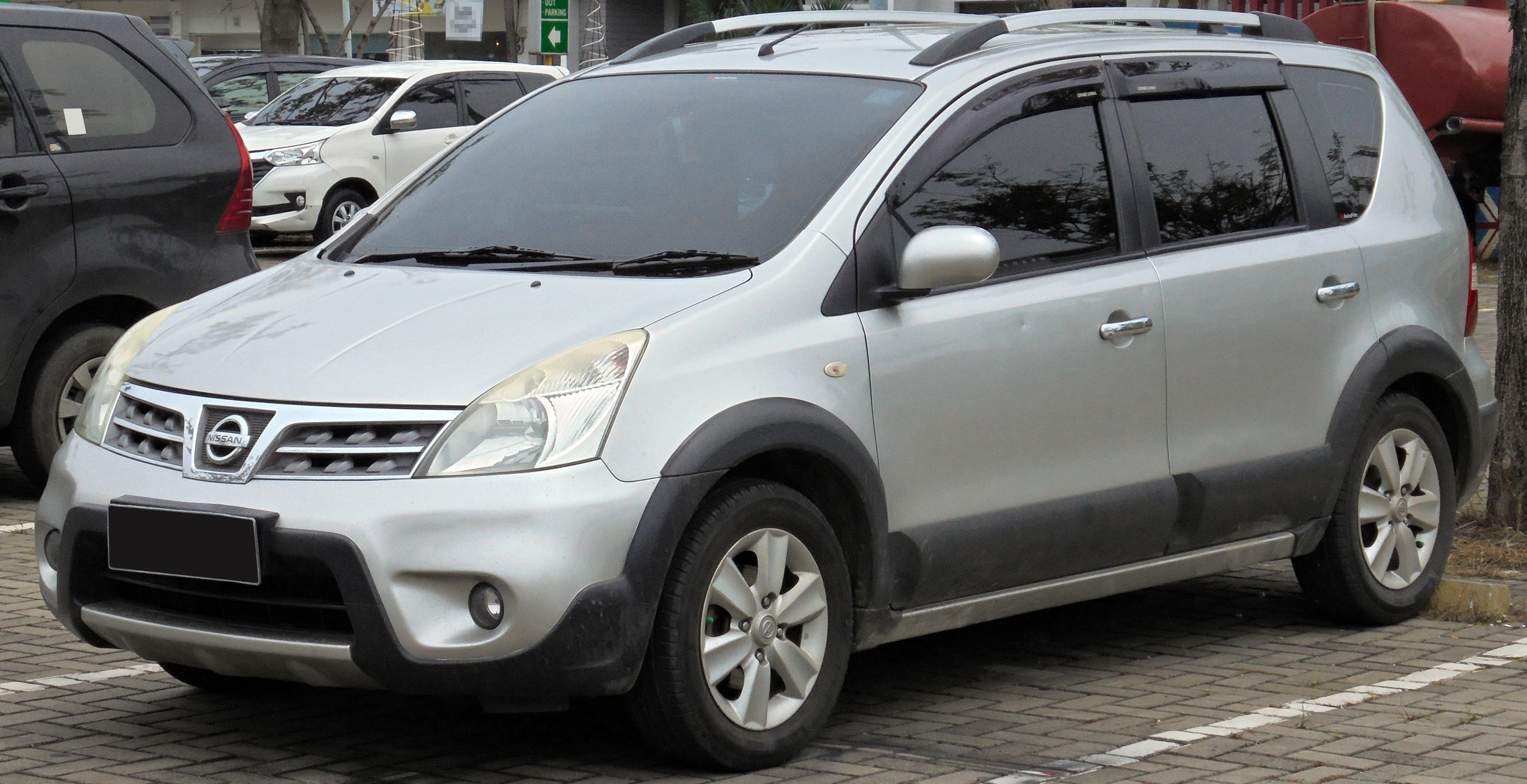
Livina X-Gear (L10, Indonesia)

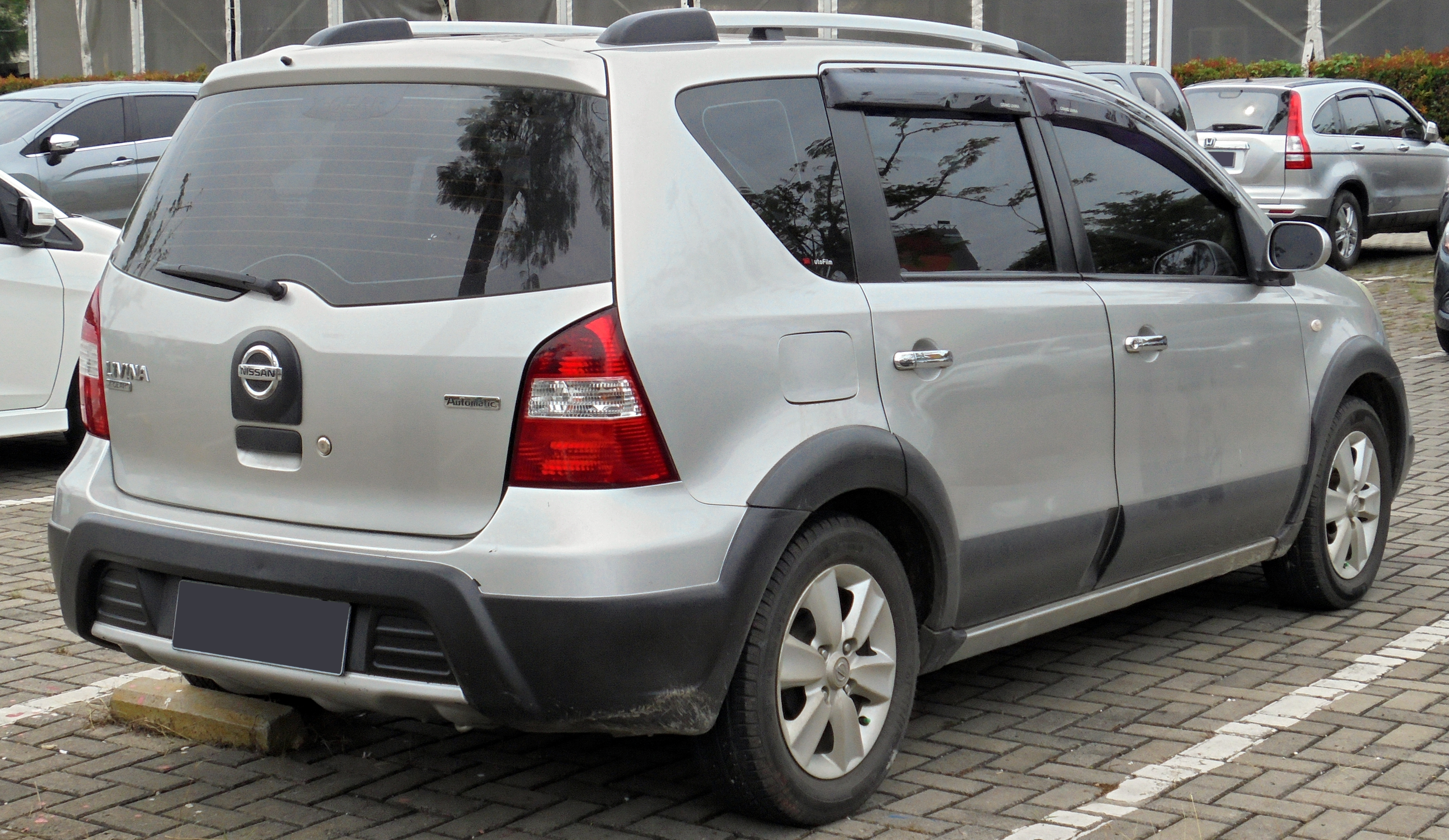
Livina X-Gear (L10, Indonesia)

==== 2011 update ====
On August 25, 2010, the updated models of both the Livina and Livina Geniss were launched in China.

On February 10, 2011, the updated models of the Grand Livina were launched in Indonesia by Nissan Motor Indonesia. Changes mainly focused on minor exterior changes such as the front grille, wheel design and other changes, while interior changes involved color changes from beige and brown to black. The facelifted Grand Livina Highway Star was launched on September 27, 2011. On August 31, 2012, the XV and Ultimate shared the same sporty Autech front bumper as the Highway Star, but full body kits and sporty alloy wheels are exclusive for the Highway Star only.

The L10-series Livina were still offered in Brazil and South Africa after the L11-series Livina models were introduced in China and Southeast Asian countries.

=== L11 (2013) ===
Spy shots of the L11-series Livina were published online on October 8, 2012. The L11-series Livina was first introduced in China at the 15th Shanghai International Automobile Industry Exhibition in April 2013, with redesigned front and rear fascias.

On May 29, 2013, the L11-series Grand Livina and Grand Livina X-Gear were launched in Indonesia. Locally marketed as an all-new model, the L11 models have revised front end, front fenders and rear panels with distinctive taillights and trunk garnishes. The Grand Livina X-Gear comes with different front bumpers, black over fenders, black body cladding and roof rails. The CVT option replaced the 4-speed automatic transmission in this model. Grade levels for the Indonesian market Grand Livina are SV, XV and Highway Star. The 1.5-litre HR15DE engine is equipped with dual injectors and dual variable valve timing control (CVTC), while the 1.8-litre MR18DE engine was only available for the X-Gear and retained the 6-speed manual or regular 4-speed automatic transmissions. In 2014, Nissan Motor Indonesia decided to end the production of the Grand Livina 1.8-litre engine, citing lack of demand. The facelifted Autech model based on Highway Star grade was unveiled on June 20, 2014.

The L11-series Grand Livina for the Malaysian market has the 1.6-litre engine and 1.8-litre engine. The 1.6-litre manual Grand Livina has since been discontinued in Malaysia.

The L11-series two-row Livina C-Gear was introduced in China, and later also available as the X-Gear in other markets including Indonesia, Malaysia, Thailand and Taiwan.

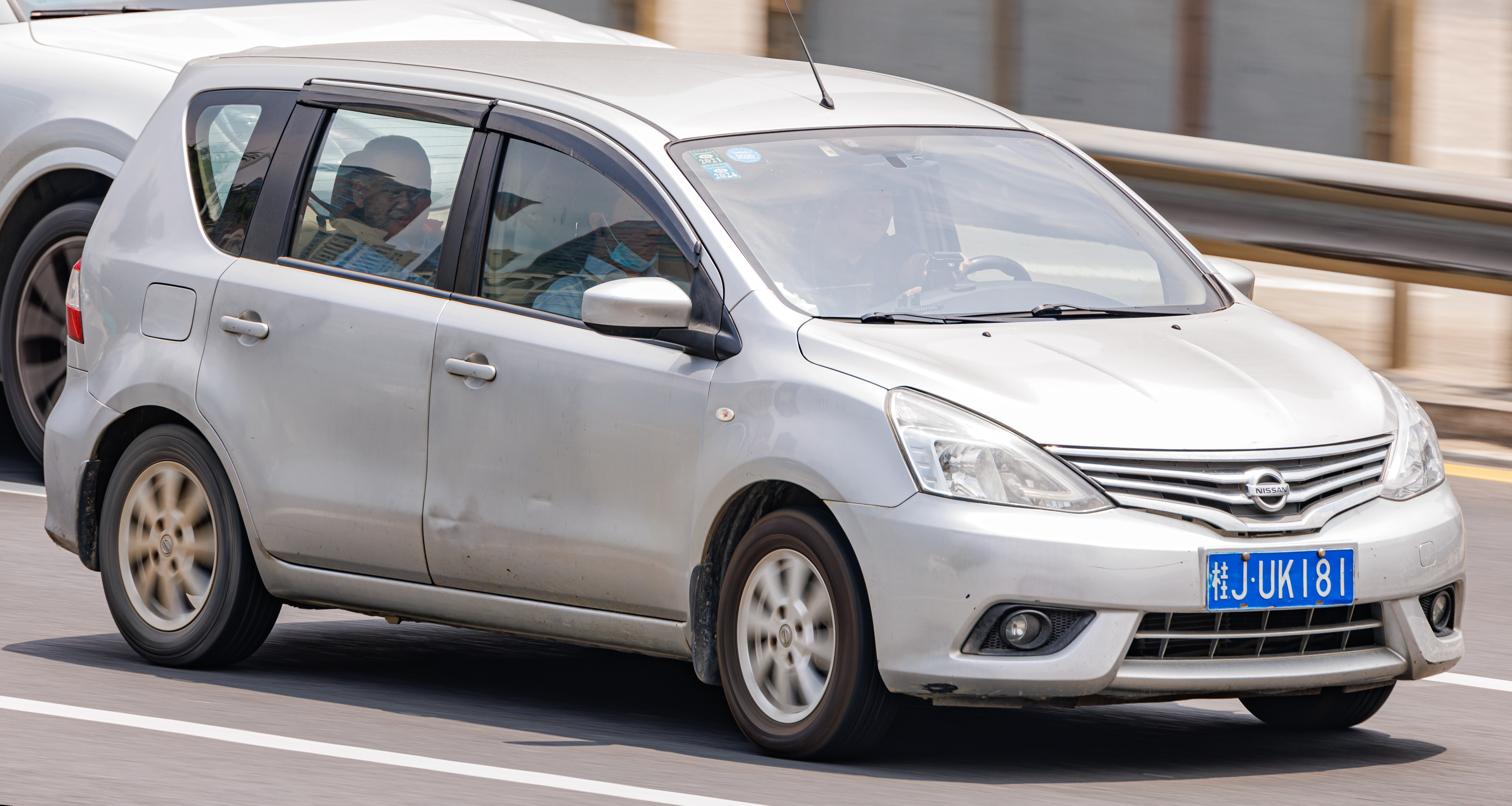
Livina (L11, China)

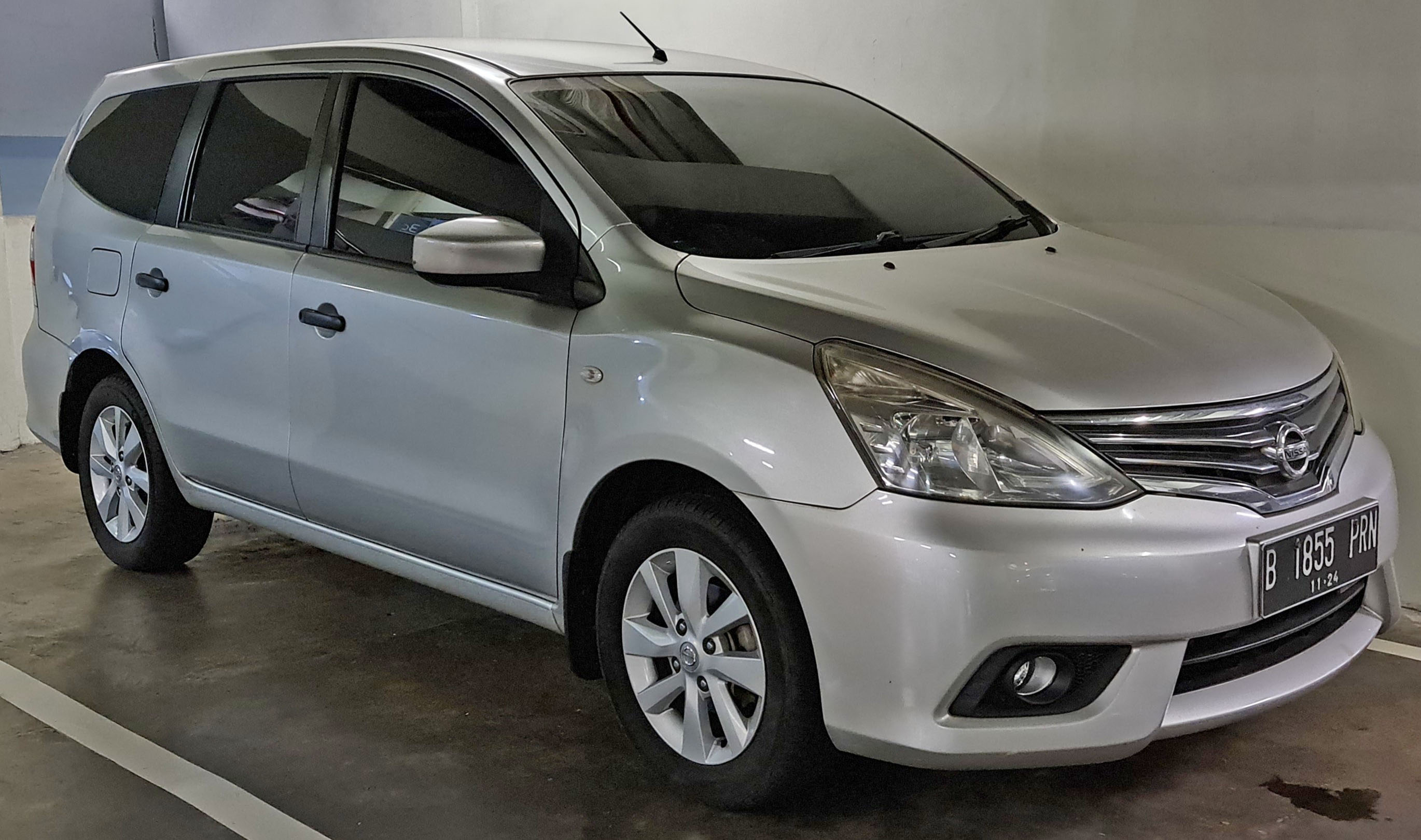
2014 Grand Livina 1.5 SV (L11; 2nd facelift Indonesia)

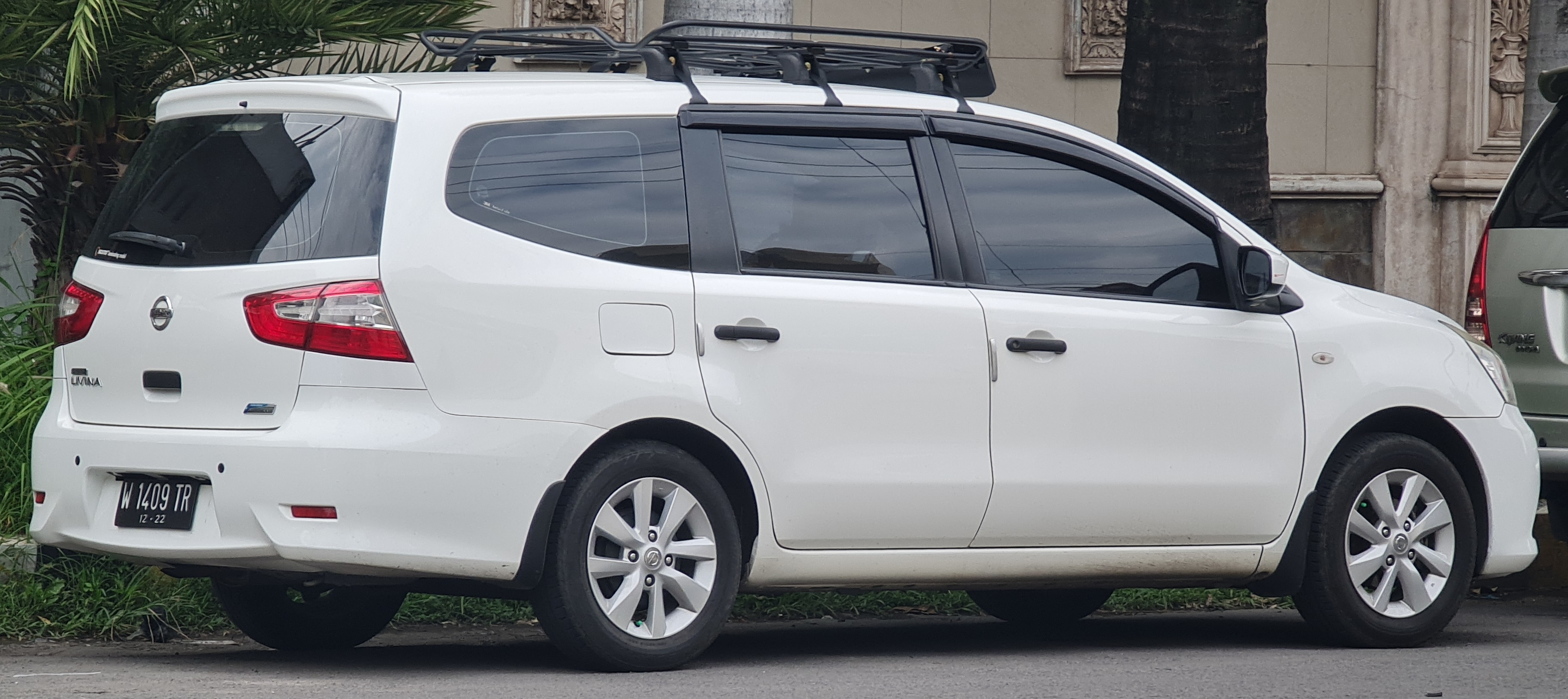
2013 Grand Livina 1.5 SV (L11; 2nd facelift Indonesia)

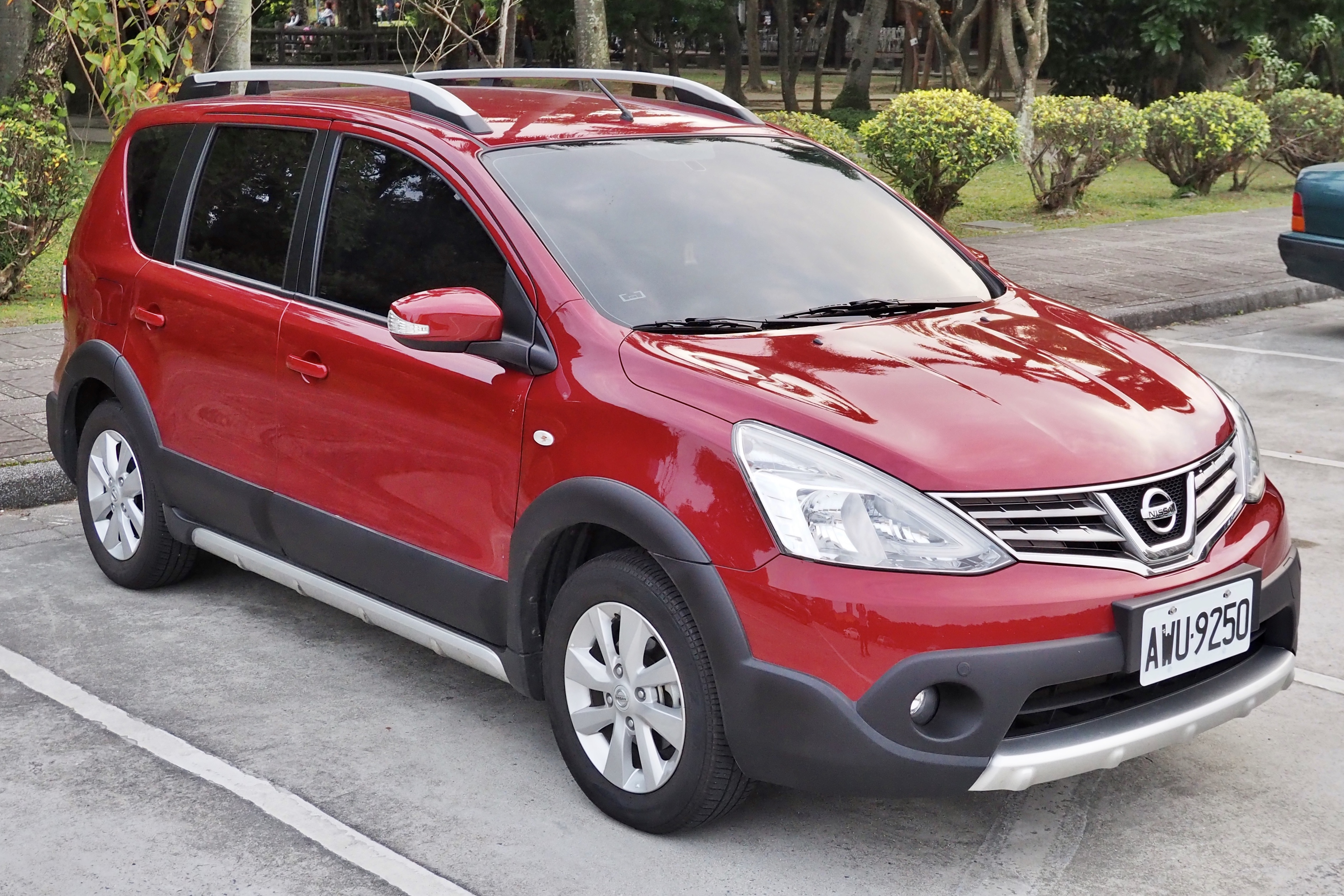
Livina X-Gear (L11, Taiwan)

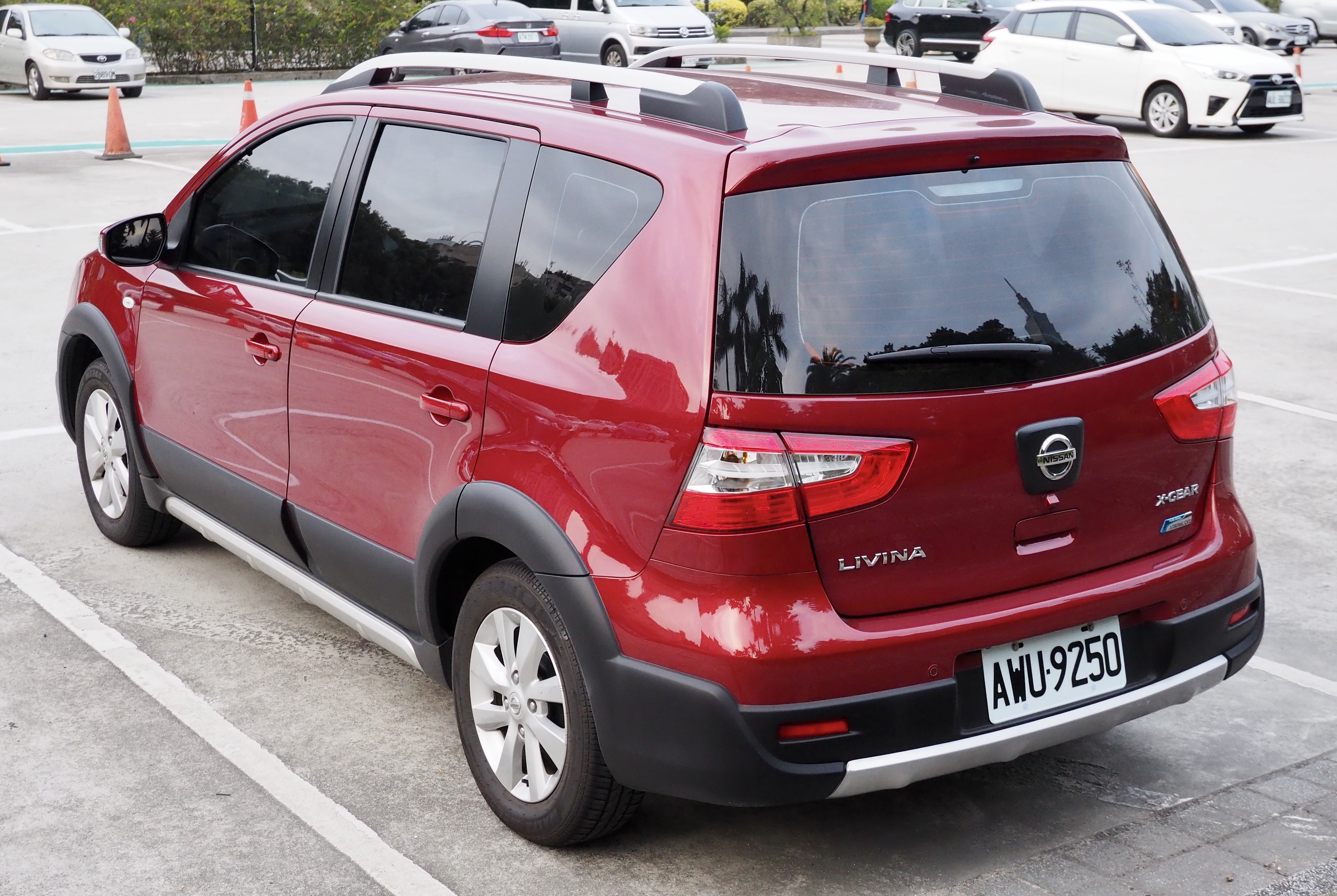
Livina X-Gear (L11, Taiwan)

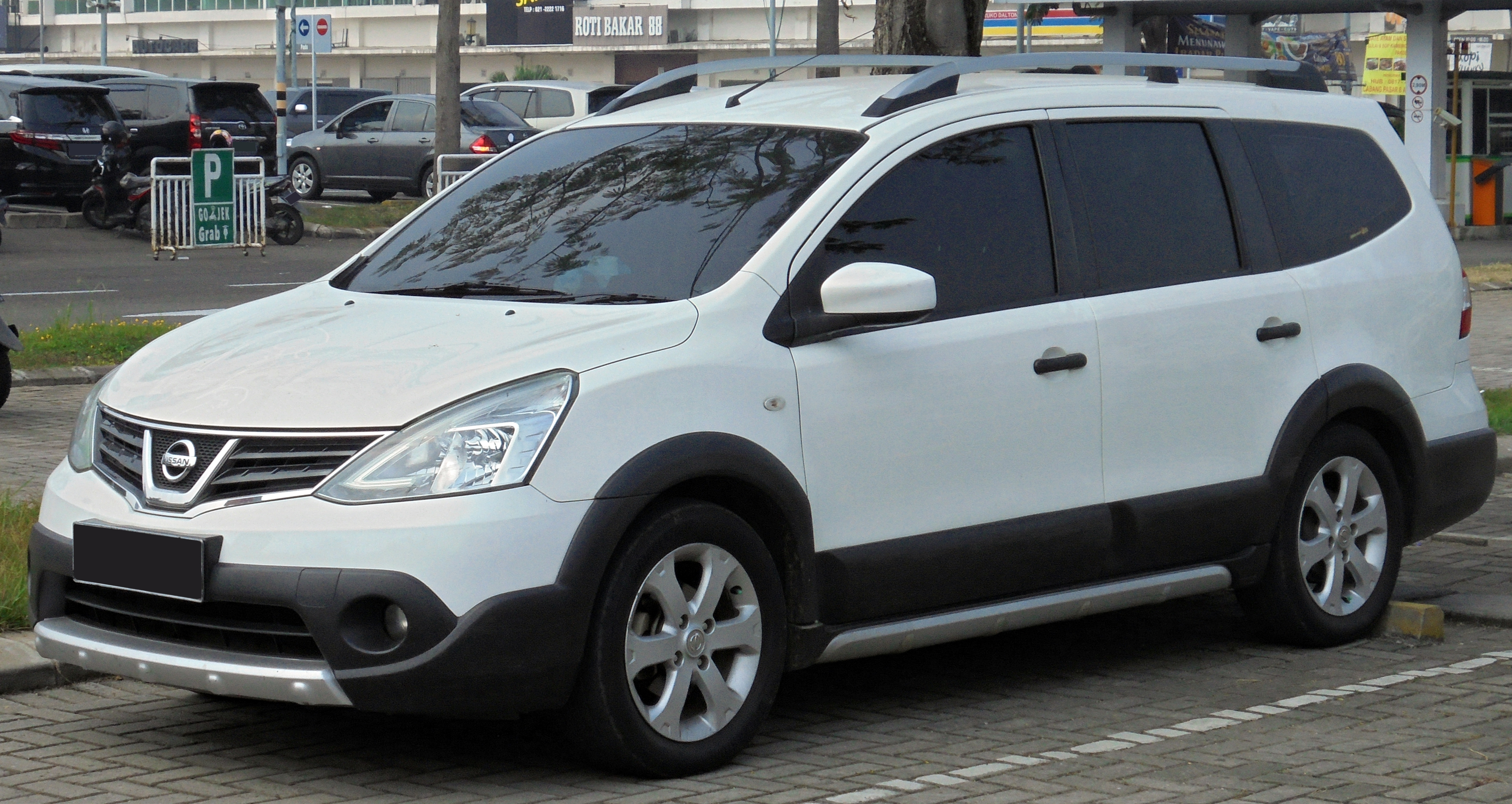
2014 Grand Livina 1.5 X-Gear (L11; 2nd facelift Indonesia)

=== Safety ===
ASEAN NCAP test results Nissan Grand Livina (2015)
Test	Points	Stars
Adult occupant:	12.50	4 /5 stars
Child occupant:	41%	2 /5 stars
Safety assist:	NA	

== Second generation (ND1W; 2019) ==
Second generation
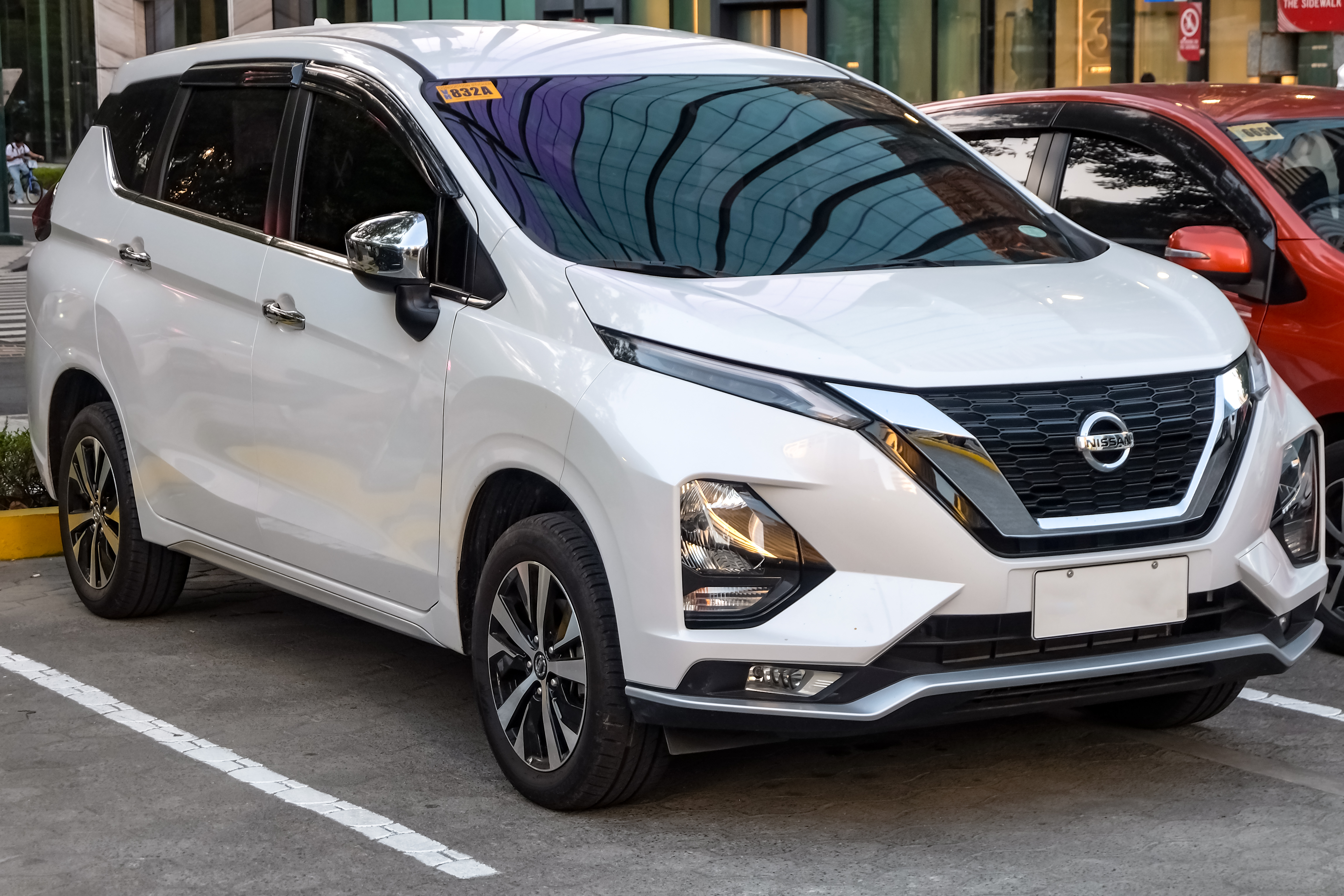
- Nissan Livina VL (ND1W, Philippines)

Overview
- Model code: ND1W
- Also called: Mitsubishi Xpander
- Production: February 2019 – present
- Assembly: Indonesia: Cikarang, West Java (MMKI)

Body and chassis
- Class: Compact MPV
- Body style: 5-door wagon

Powertrain
- Engine: Petrol: 1.5 L Mitsubishi 4A91 MIVEC I4
- Power output: 77 kW (103 hp; 105 PS)
- Transmission: 5-speed manual; 4-speed automatic

Dimensions
- Wheelbase: 2,775 mm (109.3 in)
- Length: 4,510 mm (177.6 in)
- Width: 1,750 mm (68.9 in)
- Height: 1,695–1,700 mm (66.7–66.9 in)
- Curb weight: 1,220–1,240 kg (2,690–2,734 lb)

The second-generation Livina was launched in Indonesia on February 19, 2019, a month after Nissan ceased the production of the L11 Grand Livina in the country. A byproduct of Renault–Nissan–Mitsubishi Alliance, it is a rebadged and restyled variant of the Mitsubishi Xpander and manufactured alongside it by Mitsubishi Motors plant in Cikarang, West Java. Nissan used the "Livina" name for this model due to the established nameplate usage in the country.

As it is based on the Xpander, it is only offered in one body variant and has crossover SUV-like proportions compared to previous generation's low slung station wagon-like proportions. Compared to the Xpander, Nissan has redesigned several body panels including the Nissan's V-Motion grille, headlights, front bumper, front fenders, front side doors, rear bumper, rear tailgate metal sheet casing and taillight internals.

The second-generation Livina is available in four grade levels: E, EL, VE and VL. In June 2020, the Sporty Package for the VE grade was made available in 100 units. The E grade was discontinued in 2021.

The second-generation Livina was also launched in the Philippines on September 6, 2022 in left-hand drive form and is imported from Indonesia. It is available in E, EL, VE, and VL grades.

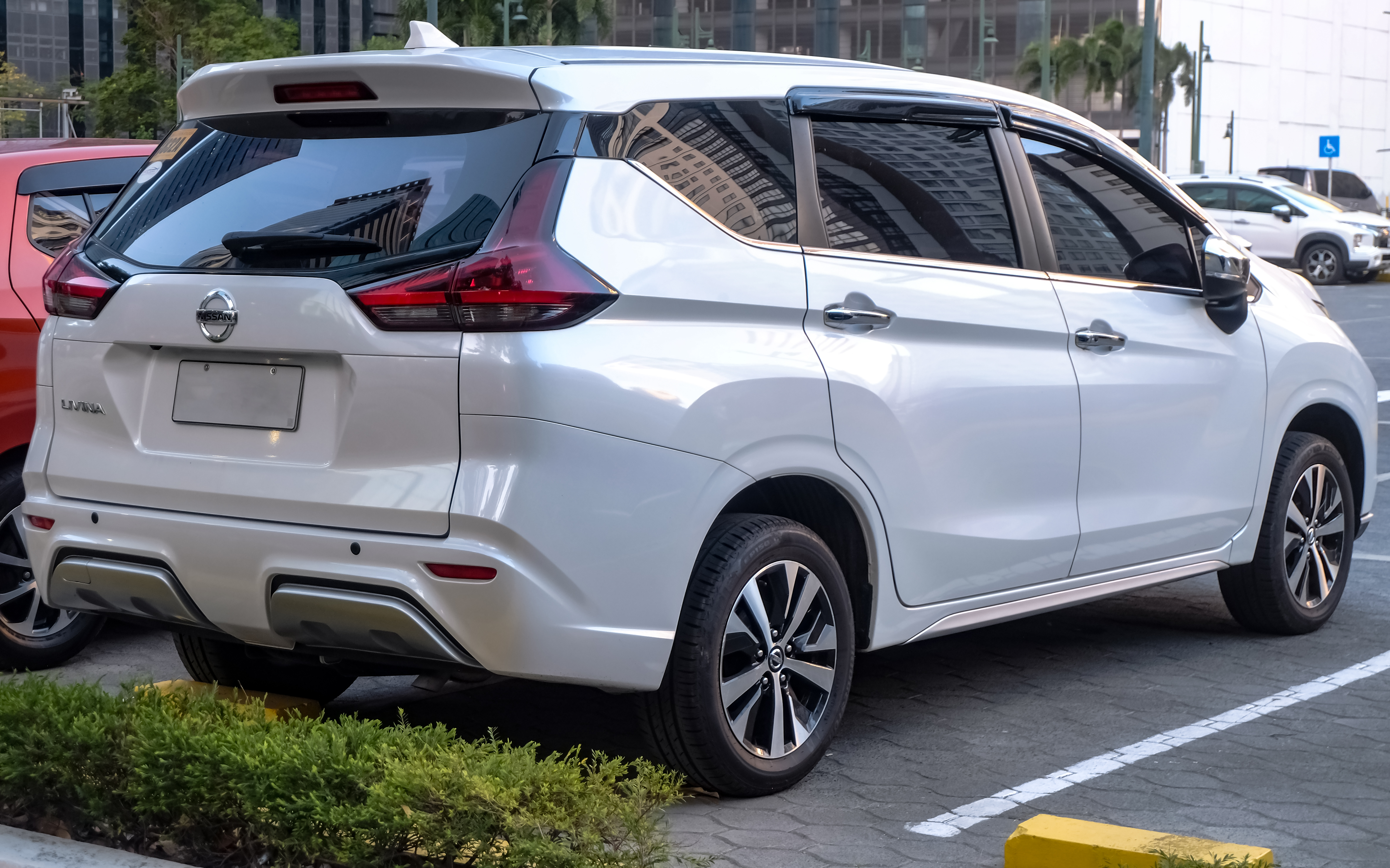
Rear view

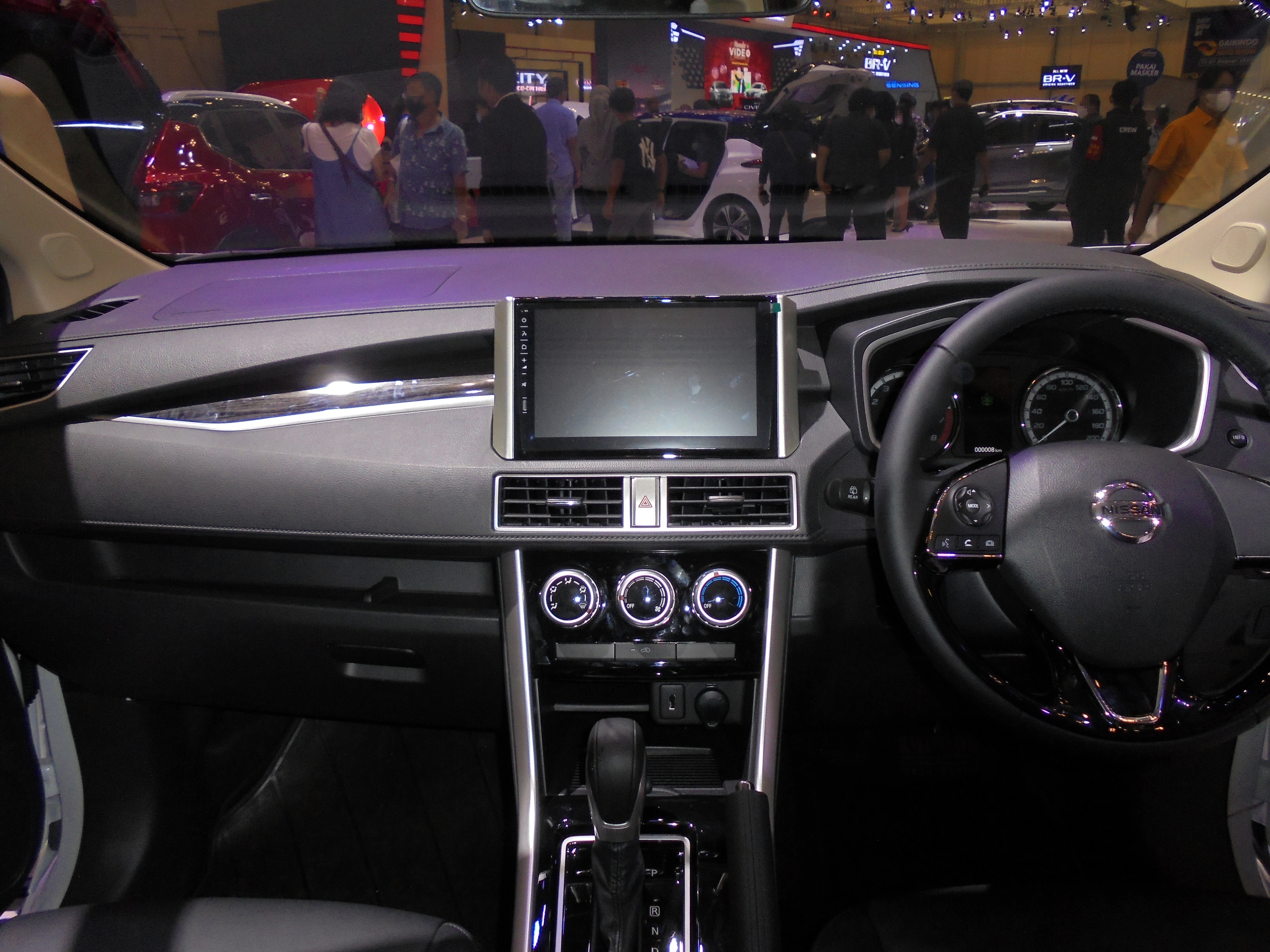
Interior

== Sales ==
Year	China			Brazil		Thailand	Indonesia			Malaysia (Note: Figures based on registration (Malaysia))	
Model	Livina	C-Gear	Geniss	Livina	Grand Livina	X-Gear	Grand Livina	Livina	Livina (ND1W)	Livina	Grand Livina
2007	41,341		10,737				4,197	200			196
2008	70,576		3,797				2,538	17,227			14,019
2009	98,735		1,770	4,956	1,156		4,328	9,779			10,778
2010	114,072		877	9,800	3,992		22,560	3,390			13,284
2011	101,393			11,853	4,834		24,590	2,239		1,059	12,107
2012	89,581			11,600	3,679		34,129	1,782		2,575	10,723
2013	36,534	32,714		6,736	2,807		35,302	1,458		980	7,463
2014	35,965	21,484		4,380	1,426	1,147	15,716	866		617	7,201
2015	17,800	5,874		1,359	196	283	8,283	142		254	5,807
2016	8,763						5,307	9		102	3,610
2017	6,169						6,204			13	1,455
2018	8,854						2,437			62	1,344
2019	5						287		8,609		238
2020									9,082		26
2021									2,015		
2022									1,097		
2023									568		
2024									162		
2025									133		
