= Albert Wessels =

South African businessman and industrialist

Albert Wessels (1 October 1908 - 22 July 1991) was a South African industrialist and the founder of Metair Investments and Toyota South Africa.

== Career ==
Wessels founded automotive component holding company Metair Investments in 1948.

Toyota South Africa can trace its roots back to 1961, when Wessels obtained a permit to import ten Toyopet Stout pickup trucks (popularly known as bakkies in South Africa) from Japan. Toyota products proved to be very popular in South Africa and by 1968 Toyota had become the largest producer of commercial vehicles in the country; in the same year it was also chosen as "company of the year" by the South African financial press.

Albert Wessels was succeeded as chief executive officer of Toyota South Africa by his son, Bert Wessels, in 1988; Bert also became the company's executive chairman on his father's death.

He married the South African poet Elisabeth Eybers in 1937, but the couple - who had three daughters and a son - divorced in 1961. However, the Albert Wessels Trust continued to fund the Elisabeth Eybers Prize.

Wessels published an autobiography, Farmboy and Industrialist, in 1987.
