= Datsun 160Z =

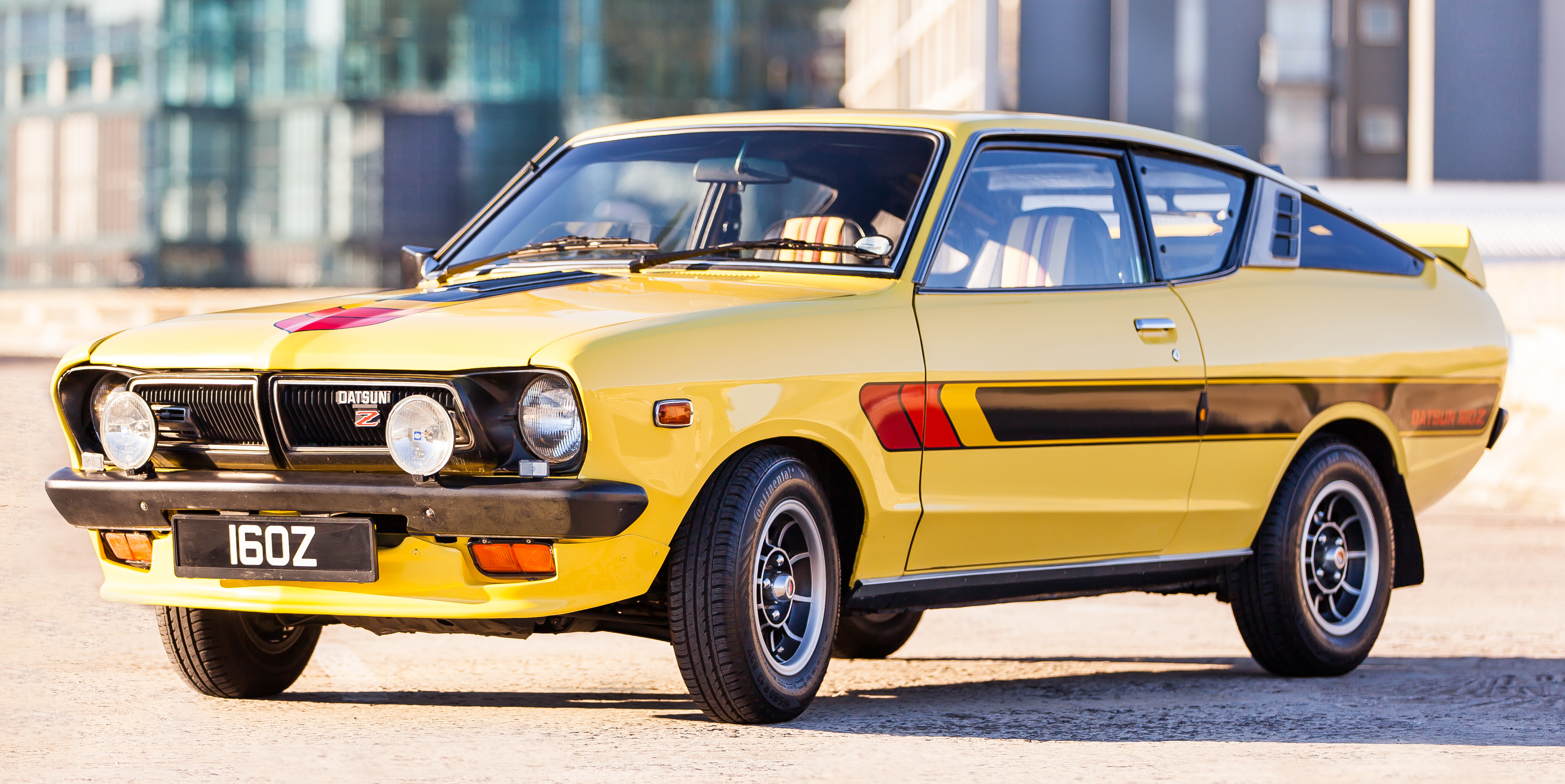

Overview
- Manufacturer: Nissan-Datsun South Africa
- Also called: Datsun 160z Sports Coupé
- Production: 1978–1979; 241 built
- Assembly: South Africa: Rosslyn

Body and chassis
- Class: Sports car
- Body style: 2-door Coupé
- Layout: FR layout

Powertrain
- Engine: 1.6 L 4 CYL OHC
- Transmission: 4-speed manual

Dimensions
- Wheelbase: 2,340 mm (92.13 in)
- Length: 4,045 mm (159.25 in)
- Width: 1,545 mm (60.83 in)
- Height: 1,370 mm (53.94 in)
- Curb weight: 970 kg (2,138.48 lb)

Chronology
- Predecessor: Datsun 140Z

The Datsun 160Z is a sports car manufactured by Nissan-Datsun South Africa from 1978 to 1979, based on the Sunny (B210).

== History ==
Following the success of the Datsun 140Z, Nissan-Datsun South Africa announced the 160Z in July 1978 . The engine was upgraded to the L16 motor as per the 160U SSS, and fitted with high performance camshaft and twin Hitachi side-draught carburettors based on the British SU type carburettor. Although the engine put out 71 kW (less than the 85 kW of the 140Z) the car had more torque at 140 N.m (DIM) at 4,200 rpm against the 140Z’s 130 N.m (DIN) at 5,000 rpm. The brakes (MacPherson strut front suspension with disc brakes) were developed according to the 280L Series pattern of increased calliper and disc size, and both rear springs and shock absorbers were also enhanced to eliminate axle-tramp.

The 160Z colour scheme was based on the Datsun 280Z Zap car and came out in canary yellow with red, orange and yellow inlayed black decals, colour matched high back seats and Mexican stripe-cloth stitched in the centre panels. The 160Z also had front and rear spoilers; however, the front spoiler differed from the 140Z. Earlier models included a black rubber rear spoiler, whilst others had a colour matched yellow fibreglass rear spoiler – there is speculation as to whether Datsun-Nissan South Africa could no longer procure rubber spoilers or whether they felt the fibreglass spoiler was lighter and more durable than the rubber one.

The 160Z, as with the 140Z, had the DX/GL front grille (without integrated driving lights) with a ‘Datsun Z’ badge. Both the 160Z and 140Z had rear window louvres, manufactured by Perana Louvres South Africa. In addition, the 160Z had aluminium alloy wheels designed by Eddie Keizan of Tiger Wheels which were then later fitted to the 140Y and 160Y GX models, also part of the Y Series.

Nissan-Datsun South Africa produced 120 160Z’s in 1978 then retailing at ZAR 5,595, and 121 in 1979 retailing at ZAR 6,395 before being discontinued. By 1980 the final stock was being sold for ZAR 6,530

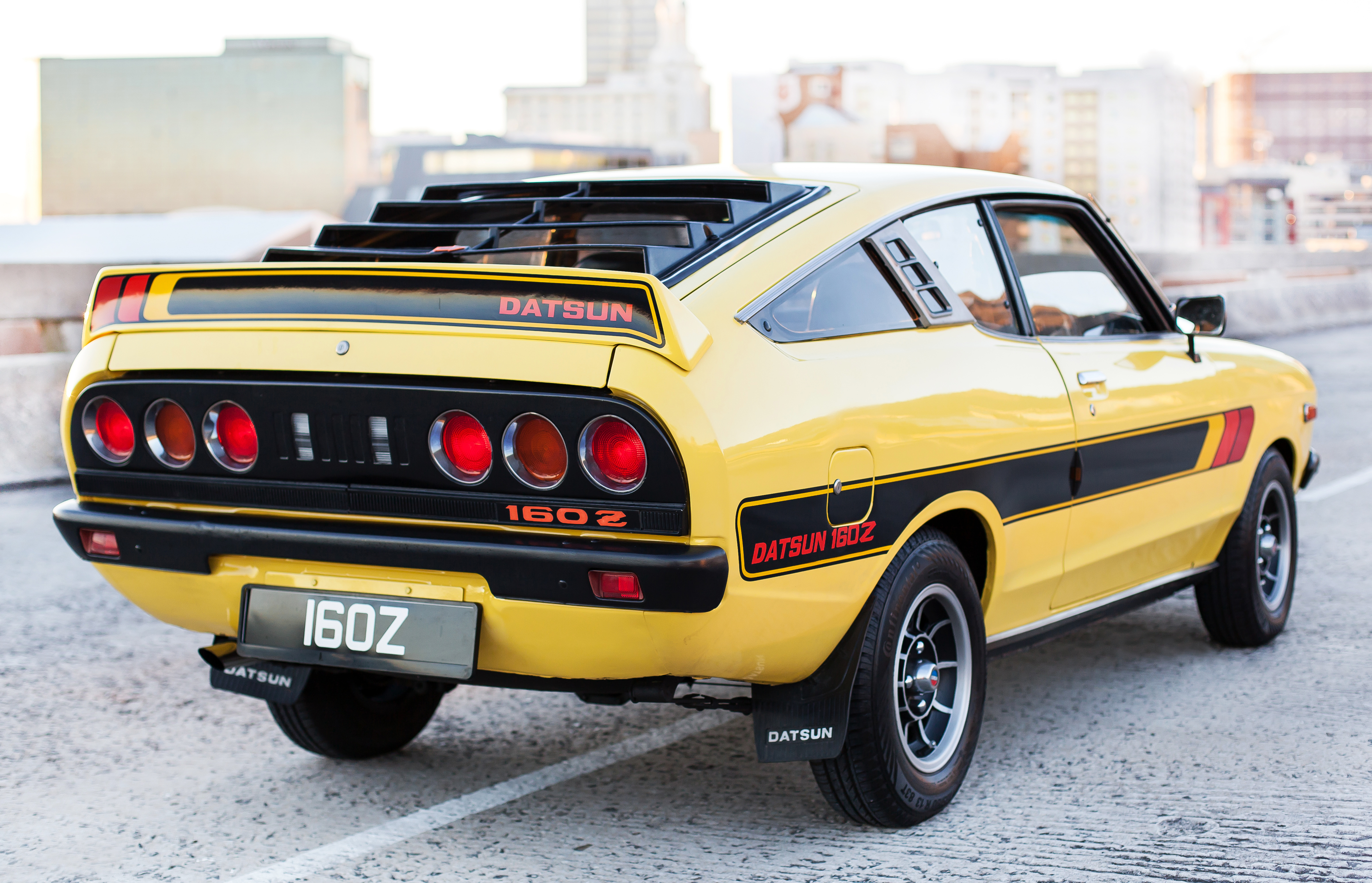
Rear view

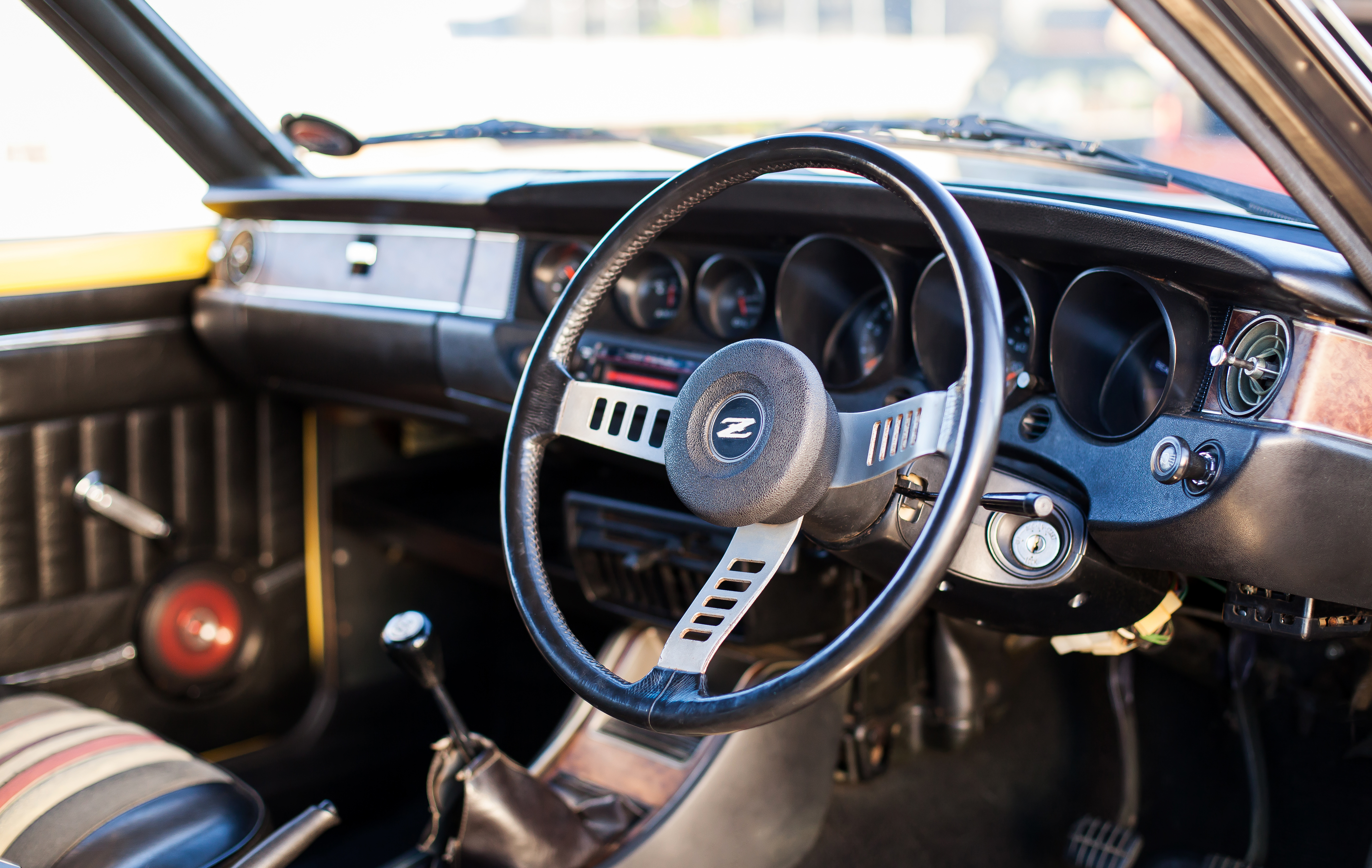
Interior

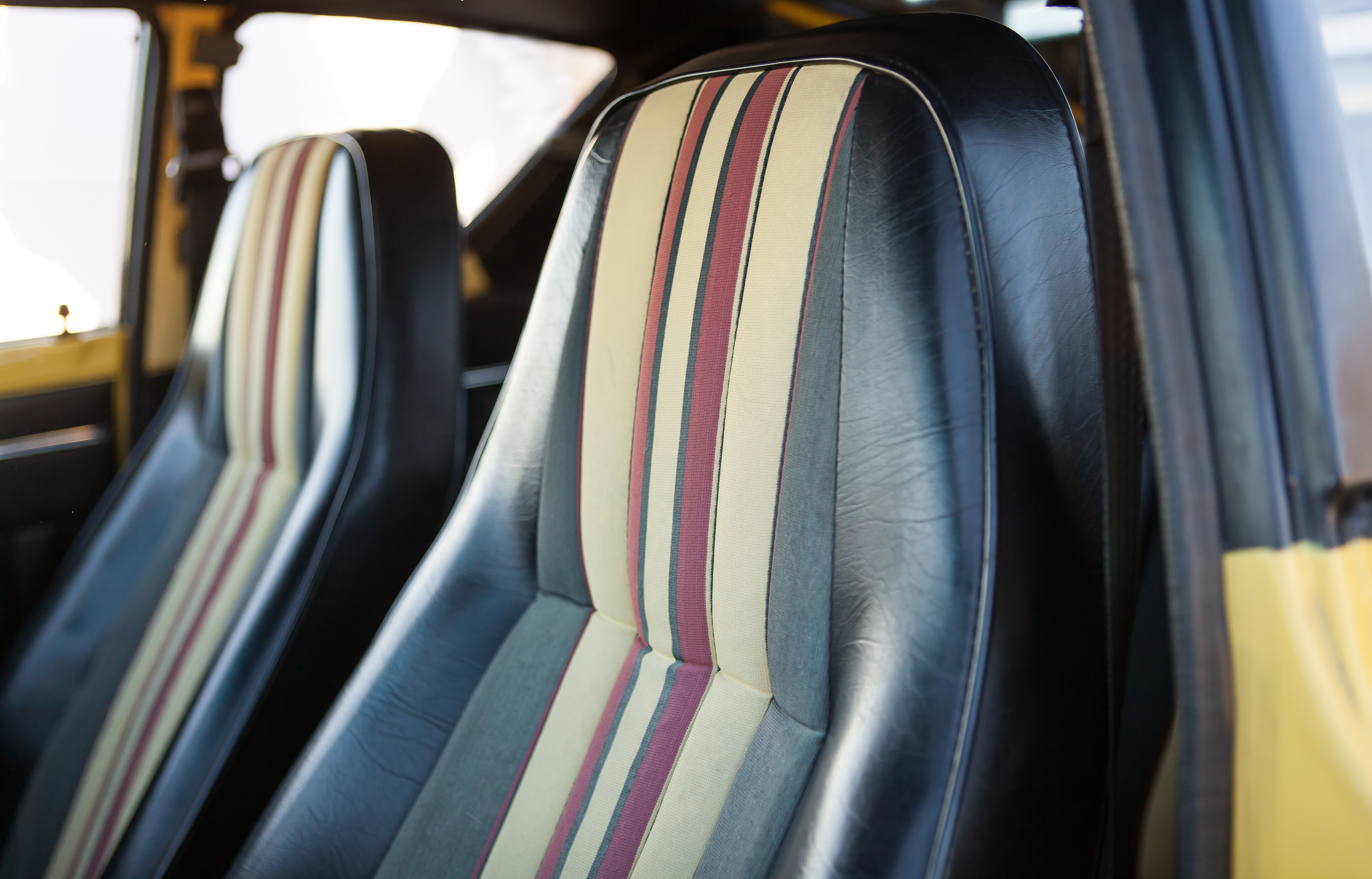
High back seats with Mexican Stripe cloth

== Specifications ==
Engine

- Type:1.6 L 4 CYL OHC 1,595cm³, cast-iron block, alloy head, two valves per cylinder, single overhead cam
- Bore & stroke: 83 x 73.7mm
- Idling speed: 600r/min
- Power (Max) DIN: 71 kW @5,800 r/min
- Torque (Max) DIN: 140 N.m @ 4,200 r/min
- Compression ratio: 9,0:1
- Compression pressure: 1170 kPa
- Oil pressure: 340/400 kPa
- Firing order: 1,4,3,2 (No. 1 at front)
- Radiator cap pressure: 88 kPa
- Thermostat opening temp: 82 °C

Carburettor

- Type: Twin Hitachi SU-type carburetor
- Main jet: Needle

Transmission

- Clutch type: Diaphragm
- Gearbox: 4 speed manual
- Rear axle: Semi-floating
- Final drive: 4,11:1
- Speed in top gear per 1,000 r/min: 27.2 km/h

Suspension

- Front: MacPherson strut
- Rear: Semi-elliptic leaf

Steering

- Type: Recirculating ball
- Turning circle: 9.6mm

Tyres and wheels

- Sizes: 165 x 13 Radial
- Rim size: 5.5J
- Tyre pressures:
  - Front: 190 kPa
  - Rear: 190 kPa

Dimensions

- Wheelbase: 2,340 mm (92.13 in)
- Length: 4,045 mm (159.25 in)
- Width: 1,545 mm (60.83 in)
- Height: 1,370 mm (53.94 in)
- Weight: 970 kg (2,138.48 lb)

Brakes

- Type:
  - Front: Disks
  - Rear: Drums
- Dia:
  - Front: 212.5 mm
  - Rear: 203.2 mm
- Servo assisted: Yes

Capacities

- Sump: 4.2L
- Gearbox: 1.7L
- Final drive: 0.8L
- Radiator: 7.0L
- Fuel tank: 43L

== Sources ==
- Imagery courtesy of E Gerber of www.160z.co.za.

== See also ==
- Nissan Sunny B210
- Nissan L engine
- Nissan Z-car
