= Nissan 1400 =

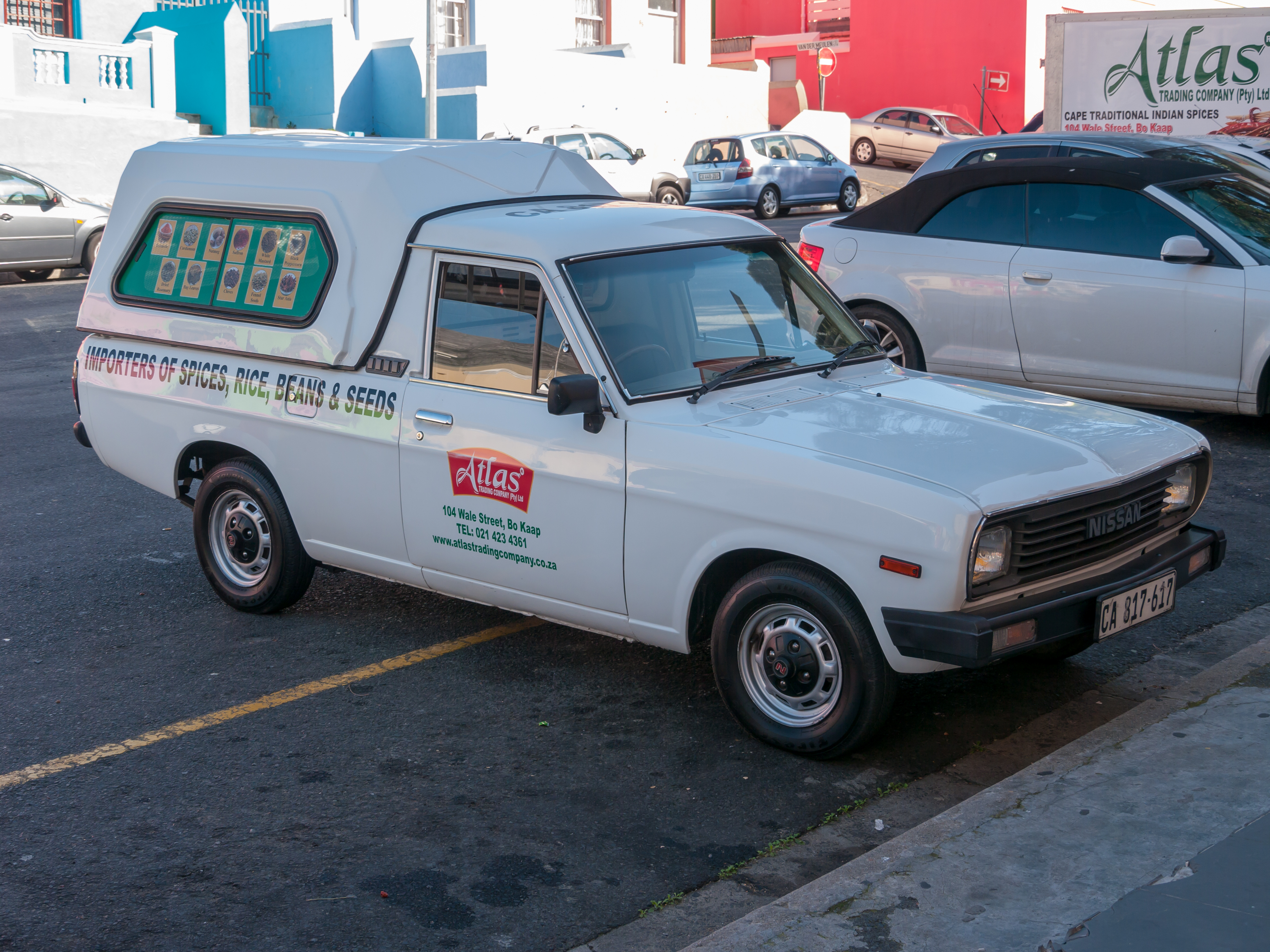

Overview
- Manufacturer: Nissan South Africa
- Production: 1971–2008
- Assembly: South Africa: Rosslyn

Body and chassis
- Body style: 2-door pick-up
- Layout: Front-engine, rear-wheel-drive layout

Powertrain
- Engine: 1.2 L I4; 1.4 L I4
- Transmission: 4/5-speed manual

Dimensions
- Wheelbase: 2,300 mm (90.6 in)
- Length: 3,845 mm (151.4 in)
- Width: 1,495 mm (58.9 in)
- Height: 1,425 mm (56.1 in)
- Curb weight: 758–772 kg (1,671–1,702 lb)

Chronology
- Successor: Nissan NP200

The Nissan 1400 is a light pick-up truck manufactured by Nissan South Africa from 1971 to 2008, under changing designations. Its successor is the Nissan NP200.

== Model history ==
The vehicle with the internal designation B120 was sold worldwide in 1971 as Datsun 1200 and was based on the Model B110. It had a payload of more than half a ton.

In 1976, the Datsun 1200 was renamed 120 Y. At the same time, production started in South Africa.

The model bore the internal designation B121 from 1979 onwards and B122 from 1981, while the larger engined variant available only in South Africa was given the number B140. The B120 was sold in Australia until 1985 and produced in Japan until 1994.

The model in South Africa received a 1.4-liter engine (code A14) in 1980 (or 1984) and was renamed to Datsun 1400 and 1982 respectively to Nissan 1400.

In 1985, the Nissan 1400 received a 75 mm higher cab roof and front disc brakes. At about the same time, local (South African) parts content had reached 100 percent.

The facelift also included the conversion to rectangular headlights and black instead of chrome bumper.

A sport model of the 1400 Bakkie was marketed as the 1400 Sport from 1988 to 1990. It had a five-speed gearbox and brown interior with sporty brown steering wheel, door panels and dash. The bucket seats were clothed in brown material with a red pin stripe. Spot lamps, Tonneau cover, Tinted windshield, Mudflaps (front and rear). The sport was available in three colours nl. Firecracker Red, Yellow and Ice White. This model had appropriate side striping with the word "SPORT" at the rear of the decal, a "SPORT" decal on the right hand front corner of the engine hood, the "NISSAN" decal on the tailgate was in fat red lettering with a thin border, bucket seats, a tachometer, a trip odometer, and central handbrake.

From late 1990 onwards the 1400 Sport was rebadged to the 1400 Champ. All the features stayed the same except the brown interior was now dropped for a grey interior such as the dash, steering wheel, side door panels with grey bucket seats etc. This vehicle had three popular local nicknames, either 1400 or 1400 Bakkie and kanniedood which, translated from Afrikaans, means "cannot die", a testament to its reliability. The 1400 Bakkie was assembled by Nissan in Rosslyn, South Africa (Nissan). Another assembly location for the model was the Aymesa plant in Quito, Ecuador which assembled it under the Datsun brand name as the 1200 PickUp.

Further facelifts took place in 2002 and 2005. Later models of the Nissan 1400 had a five-speed gearbox. Essential technical aspects such as engine with carburetor, leaf springs and rear-wheel drive remained unchanged throughout the construction period.

The Nissan 1400 was regarded as a reference of this class in South Africa and was also nicknamed "Champion of Africa". The production, which was discontinued due to stricter emission and safety regulations, ended with 150 copies of the Heritage Edition.
