= Nissan South Africa =

South African automobile manufacturer

Nissan South Africa Pty Ltd

- Type: Subsidiary
- Industry: Automotive
- Founded: 1963; 63 years ago
- Headquarters: Centurion, Gauteng, South Africa
- Area served: South Africa
- Key people: Juan Wheeler (MD)
- Products: Passenger vehicles
- Services: Vehicle servicing
- Parent: Nissan
- Website: nissan.co.za

Nissan South Africa is a South African automotive company based in Centurion, Gauteng. Founded in 1966, the company is a subsidiary of major Japanese automaker Nissan.

== History ==
In the 1960s, brothers Thys and Andries Bekker imported the first Datsun 1000 bakkie to South Africa.

In 1965, the assembly of Datsun automobiles began at Motor Assemblies. The Datsun 1200 was the first Japanese passenger car to be imported in South Africa in 1966. Other sources cite the year 1959.

After the assembly plant Motor Assemblies, in which models of different brands were produced, was taken over by Toyota end of 1964, it came to the founding of the Rosslyn Motor Assemblers Ltd. and to the construction of an assembly plant mainly for Datsun models in Rosslyn.

Opened in 1966, the factory was initially a free assembly plant for the South African market, as the Bekker brothers awarded the Nissan concession to the mining company Messina Transvaal, which was interested in a greater diversification of the assembly. Other sources name the year 1965 as the opening year.

The company was renamed Datsun Nissan South Africa Ltd. in 1973 and, according to one source, focused on the sole production of Nissan products sold under the Datsun brand.

In 1983, the name of the company was changed to Nissan SA.

With the start of production of the FIAT Uno in 1988, a new parent company called Automakers SA Ltd. was founded. This company was located in Sandton. In one source, this company is also referred to as Nissan Automakers SA.

In the year 2000 (or already 1997), Nissan acquired a 37% stake in Automakers SA Ltd. One year later, the name was changed to Nissan South Africa Pty. Ltd..

In 2013, Nissan's Rosslyn plant employed around 2,000 people.

=== Manufacturing divestiture ===
In January 2026, as part of its global turnaround strategy, Nissan announced it had reached a deal to sell its Rosslyn, Gauteng plant to Chinese automaker Chery. This would mark the end of Nissan manufacturing in South Africa. As part of the deal, Chery SA would purchase the land, buildings, and associated assets of Nissan's facilities in mid-2026, provided the deal passed regulatory approvals. Nissan confirmed it would continue selling and servicing models in South Africa. The company also said that most affected Nissan SA employees would be offered contracts with similar terms with Chery SA.

In June 2026, the South African Competition Commission recommended the sale of Nissan's Rosslyn plant to Chery be allowed. Later that same month, the country's Competition Tribunal approved the sale. Chery, which had seen a significant increase in SA sales in recent years, would use the plant for manufacturing numerous models locally. Chery officially took ownership of the plant in July 2026.

== Models ==
In addition to Datsun models that were produced between 1967 and 1973, vehicles of the Alfa Romeo brand were also produced Added to this were Rambler vehicles (January 1968 to 1969) and Renault models (from 1968). In the next few years, the product range was supplemented by vehicles from the brands Peugeot and Citroën.

From 1971 to 2008, the Nissan 1400 bakkie was built exclusively in South Africa (initially as Datsun 1200, then as Datsun 120Y or 1400). In total, around 275,000 copies of the Nissan 1400 were sold. Other models made only in South Africa were the Datsun 140Z (mid-1970s) and the Datsun 160Z (1978-1980).

From 1990 (or 1988) to 2005, the FIAT Uno was manufactured. The end of production is also stated in 2004. Other FIAT models produced by Nissan South Africa have been the FIAT Palio (since 1999), the FIAT Siena (since 2000) and the FIAT Strada (since 2005). The assembly agreement with FIAT was due to expire in 2008

The production of Nissan Primera began in the late 1990s.

Production of the NP200 and NP300 bakkies, as well as the Nissan Livina and the Sandero of the Alliance partner Renault took place.

In the years 1976 to 1978 (or 1976 and 1978), with its brand Datsun, Nissan was the leading supplier in South Africa. In 2014, Nissan had the second largest market share in Sub-Saharan Africa (excluding South Africa).
