= Automotive industry in South Africa =

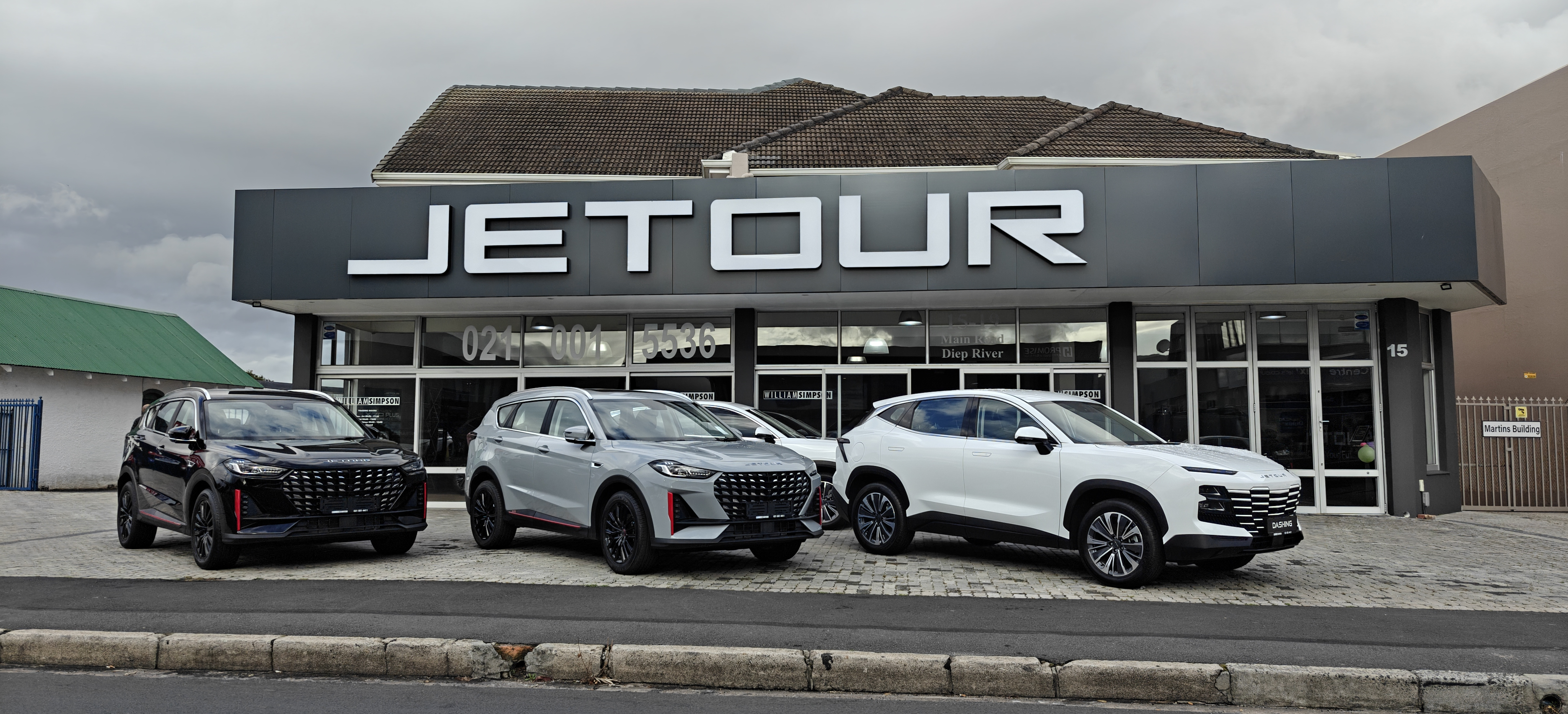
Jetour dealership in Cape Town

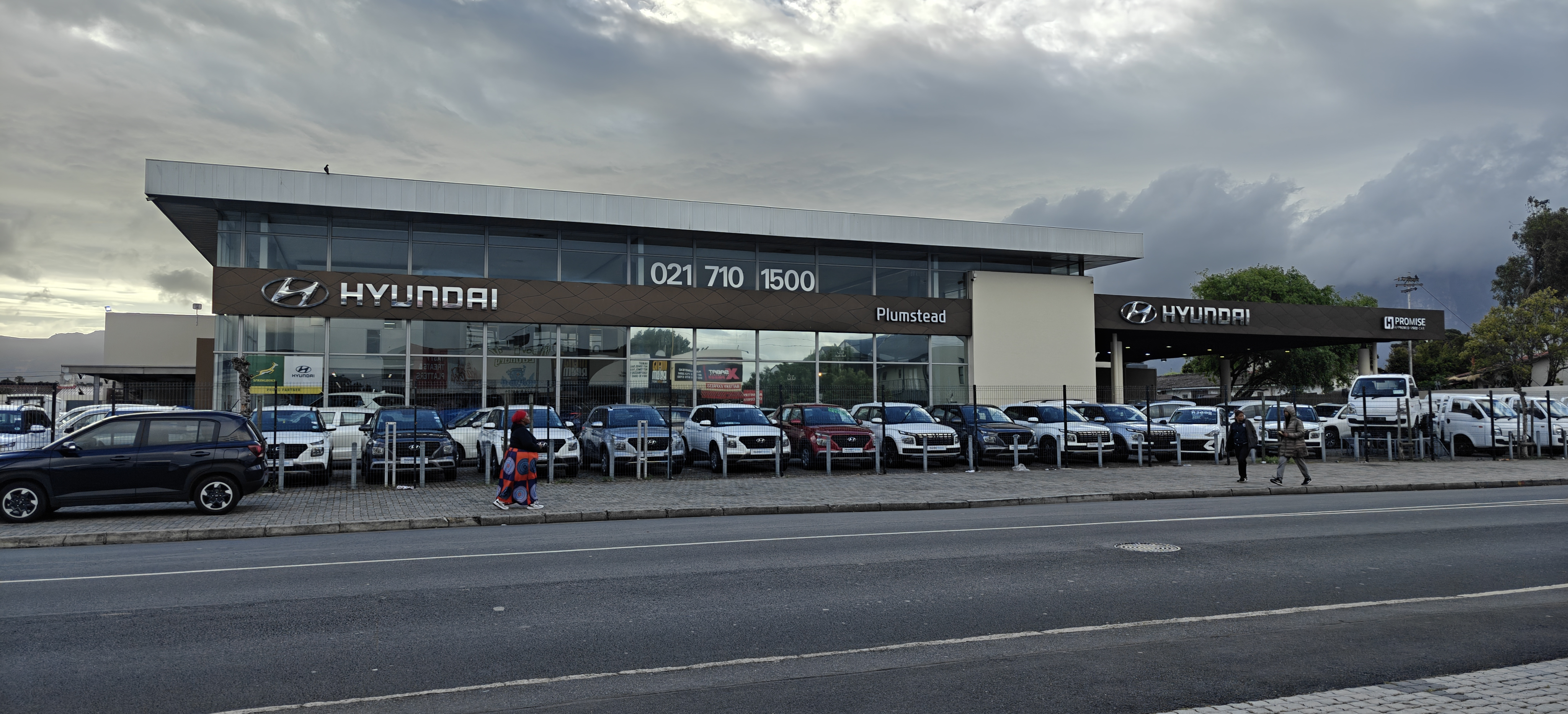
Hyundai dealership in Cape Town

South Africa has a well-developed automotive industry, and is the leader in Africa in terms of production volume. The country produces more than half a million automobiles annually, of various types. While domestic development of certain vehicles, like trucks and military vehicles, does exist, most are built under license from major foreign brands.

The country has developed a particular niche and competitive advantage for manufacturing pickup trucks (bakkies), which are popular locally and are exported to foreign markets.

As of mid-2026, there are seven major companies manufacturing significant volumes of passenger vehicles in South Africa - BMW, Chery, Ford, Isuzu, Mercedes-Benz, Toyota, and Volkswagen. Other companies, such as BAIC Motor, manufacture in SA at smaller scale.

South Africa has thriving new and preowned car markets, comprising a variety of competing automotive dealerships, including branded franchises for new vehicles, and private preowned dealerships and dealer groups. Some groups maintain exclusive import rights for certain foreign vehicle brands. Major dealership groups include Motus, ROLA, Hatfield Motor Group, CFAO, Fuzion, and Super Group.

Over 500,000 new passenger vehicles and over 120,000 preowned passenger vehicles are sold in South Africa annually.

The Retail Motor Industry Organisation (RMI) is a trade association representing the interests of the automotive retail sector, and comprises eight Constituent Associations, including the National Automobile Dealer's Association. The Independent Dealer Association (IDA) also operates in South Africa, and regulates the conduct of its members.

Numerous industry players, including manufacturers, are represented by Naamsa, South Africa's automotive business council.

The automotive industry also involves the operations of numerous large vehicle and general insurance companies, including OUTsurance, Naked, Pineapple, King Price, Santam, and Discovery, as well as quote aggregation website Hippo.

In terms of fuel, major players in South Africa are locally-headquartered Engen (SA's largest petrol station chain) and Sasol, and foreign-owned brands Astron Energy, Shell, and BP. Forecourt chains Total and Puma Energy also have a presence, albeit smaller. PetroSA is the national oil and petrol company of South Africa, and is focused on natural gas extraction and production of synthetic fuels, as well as crude oil extraction. The country has two active crude oil refineries; the Astron Energy Refinery in the Western Cape and the Natref Refinery in the Free State, which together produce (as of 2026) a combined 208,000 barrels per day. The interests of the industry in SA are represented by the Fuels Industry Association of South Africa (FIASA), of which the aforementioned companies are all members.

In 2024, the average purchase price of a new passenger vehicle in South Africa was around R400,000. In the same year, it was estimated that there were around 1,500 distinct passenger vehicle models for sale in South Africa, 1,082 of which cost over half a million rand. The price of new vehicles increased by an average of 4.7% the first quarter of 2024, with the steepest increases in the hatchback and crossover segments.

As of 2025, Toyota remains the top-selling new passenger vehicle brand in South Africa, with its best-selling model being the Corolla Cross compact SUV, which is manufactured locally. Toyota sells almost double the number of units per month than runner-up Suzuki, whose best-selling model is the Swift hatchback.

As of April 2026, crossovers are the most popular new vehicle segment, accounting for 36.9% of sales.

Both new and preowned EVs and PHEVs are becoming more available (in terms of the number of models on offer from various manufacturers), affordable, and popular in the South African market. As of 2025, the local EV industry is already worth around R3 billion, and is expected to grow steadily. Public charging infrastructure is also set to expand significantly over the coming years, with investments from the likes of BYD, Charge, and the National Automobile Association of South Africa.

== History ==
=== Early days ===
Automotives first came to South Africa in 1896 when a Benz Velo was imported and it was demonstrated on January 4 of 1897 in Pretoria in front of President Paul Kruger.

The early days of the South African motoring industry were focused on the American brands Ford and Chevrolet. In 1922 Henry Ford visited Port Elizabeth and by 1923 Ford had started the first assembly plant in PE. General Motors joined soon afterwards producing Ceves Buicks Oldsmobiles and Pontiacs.

In the mid-1960s, Ford and GM still controlled over 60% of the local car market with Ford's and Chevrolets dominating until the mid-1950s when the German and British small cars began to impact. In the early 1960s Studebaker became VW set up by managers from Ford PE who went on to develop VW- USA for the German company.

By the late 1960s, Toyota, Datsun, and Mercedes were all developing factories in SA, and British makers were being pushed out. In the late seventies, Sigma Motors had planned to merge with British Leyland, known as Leykor locally - when this merger failed, Leyland had to scramble to create an all-new dealer network in only a month. Leyland's South African presence never recovered.

The apartheid government asked Ford and GM to advise on policy to develop the local automobile component manufacturing industry. Ford and GM engineers asked to include black people in development to address chronic poverty. This was refused. However between Ford, GM and VW the three largest manufacturers (Ford about 28%, GM about 32% and VW about 15%) they accelerated local component development so rapidly that by 1968 that had destroyed Job Reservation policy in the auto industry allowing black people to work in factories previously reserved for whites.

After the fuel crisis, the large American cars which had been very popular dropped in sales drastically. By the end of the 1970s, the Mazda 323 and the Volkswagen Golf were the biggest sellers and American-designed cars were no longer regularly available. For a while, the demand for big saloons had been met by assembling the somewhat more compact Australian Fords and Holdens, but these were discontinued in favour of more compact European designs.

1976 showed the worst sales numbers since 1972. Chrysler SA went belly up soon thereafter, merging with Illings (Mazda) to form Sigma. Chrysler had been very successful in the late sixties, with the Valiant range being the most sold passenger car in 1966, 1967, and 1968, but began a serious slide after that. The acquisition of Mitsubishi gave Chrysler a stay of execution but the severe economic climate of the latter half of the 1970s proved too much.

=== Growth ===
The automotive industry catered to 303,000 employees in South Africa in 2003, and in 2004 the country exported fully assembled motor vehicles to 53 countries including many developed countries such as Japan, the United States, the United Kingdom, Australia and Germany, with many of the manufacturers based in South Africa now making it their main production base.

In 2004, South Africa was responsible for the manufacture of 84% of all vehicles produced in Africa, 7 million of which are on the South African roads. Also in 2004, the industry made a 6.7% contribution to the GDP of South Africa and 29% of all South African manufacturers made up the country's automotive industry. 2004 also saw 110,000 vehicles exported from South Africa of which 100,000 were passenger vehicles.

In 2007 and next years the automotive industry grew again, producing over 500,000 vehicles annually reaching peak of 616,000 in 2015. While amounting to a small fraction and 22nd place of the global vehicle production of near 100 million, this made great contributions locally, being supremely first in Africa and making up 7.5% of the country's GDP and about 10% of South Africa's manufacturing exports.

In 2010, the Naamsa, SA's automotive business council, reported that new vehicle sales exceeded their initial expectations of 7%, with large local growth allowing it to reach 24%, providing a big boost after the 2008/09 recession. This was evident in 2010 with 271,000 vehicles being exported, more than double what was seen in previous years.

=== Further developments ===
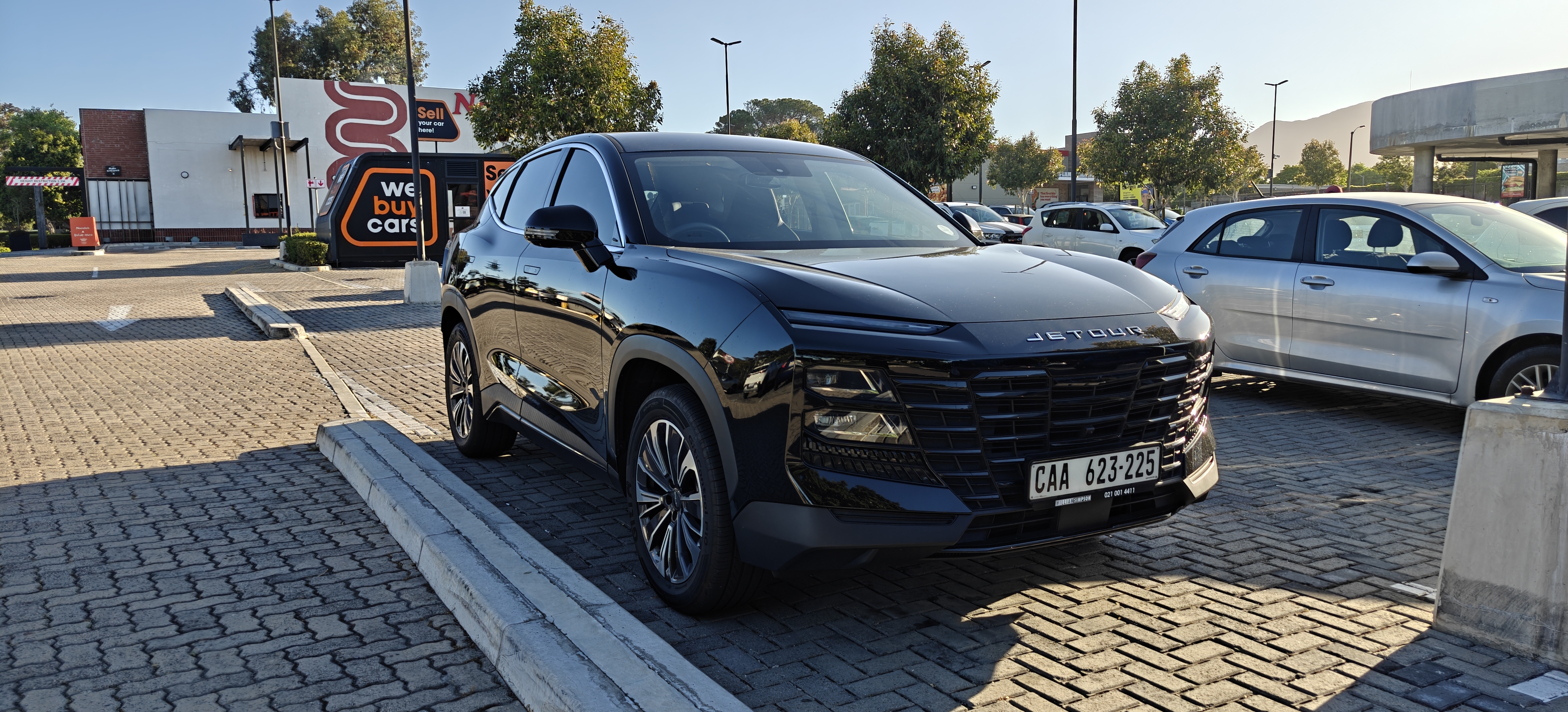
Chinese vehicles, like this Jetour Dashing in Cape Town, present good value for money, and are becoming more popular in the South African auto market

In 2025, there were reported to be a total of 115,000 individuals working in the South African automotive industry, 80,000 of whom were working in component manufacturing. At the time, the industry accounted for 22.6% of South Africa's manufacturing output, and 5.2% of its GDP. It was further reported that in 2024, the component sector exported R62.5 billion worth of goods.

The local automotive sector is guided by the South African Automotive Master Plan 2035 (SAAM), which aims to grow SA vehicle production to 1% of global output (equivalent to a total of 1.4 million vehicles), increase local content to 60%, double employment in the sector to 224,000 employees, and deepen transformation and value addition, with 25% Black-owned involvement at the Tier 2 and Tier 3 component manufacturer level.

In October 2025, Chinese automaker BYD announced that it would begin a massive rollout of its Super e-Platform fast-charge EV chargers across South Africa, starting with unveiling between 200 and 300 chargers in 2026. The new charging stations are capable of BYD's Megawatt Flash Charging, which boosts compatible EVs by 2 kilometers per 1 second of charging, and can recharge up to 400 kilometers in just 5 minutes.

Supporting 10C charging, the chargers are able to charge at over 1,000 volts, with a max output of 1,360 kW. The infrastructure will also more be environmentally-friendly than using the grid, instead making use of solar power and battery energy storage systems for the chargers.

These charging stations are already supported by BYD's Han L and Tang L models, which at the time had already started preorders in China. At the launch event for the new tech, BYD's President and Chairman Wang Chuanfu stated that, "The ultimate solution is to make charging as quick as refueling a gasoline car".

Vehicles from China are becoming more popular in South Africa, and the former's automakers are a large part of the transition to hybrids, PHEVs, and EVs. While other auto manufacturers have had doubts about South Africa's willingness to purchase new energy vehicles, Chinese manufacturers like Omoda, Chery, and BYD have launched numerous such models, even before a large-scale public charging infrastructure rollout in SA. As of 2025, there are 16 vehicle brands from China for sale in South Africa (one third of the total number of brands on sale), with another 9 on the way.

=== A historic month for the industry ===
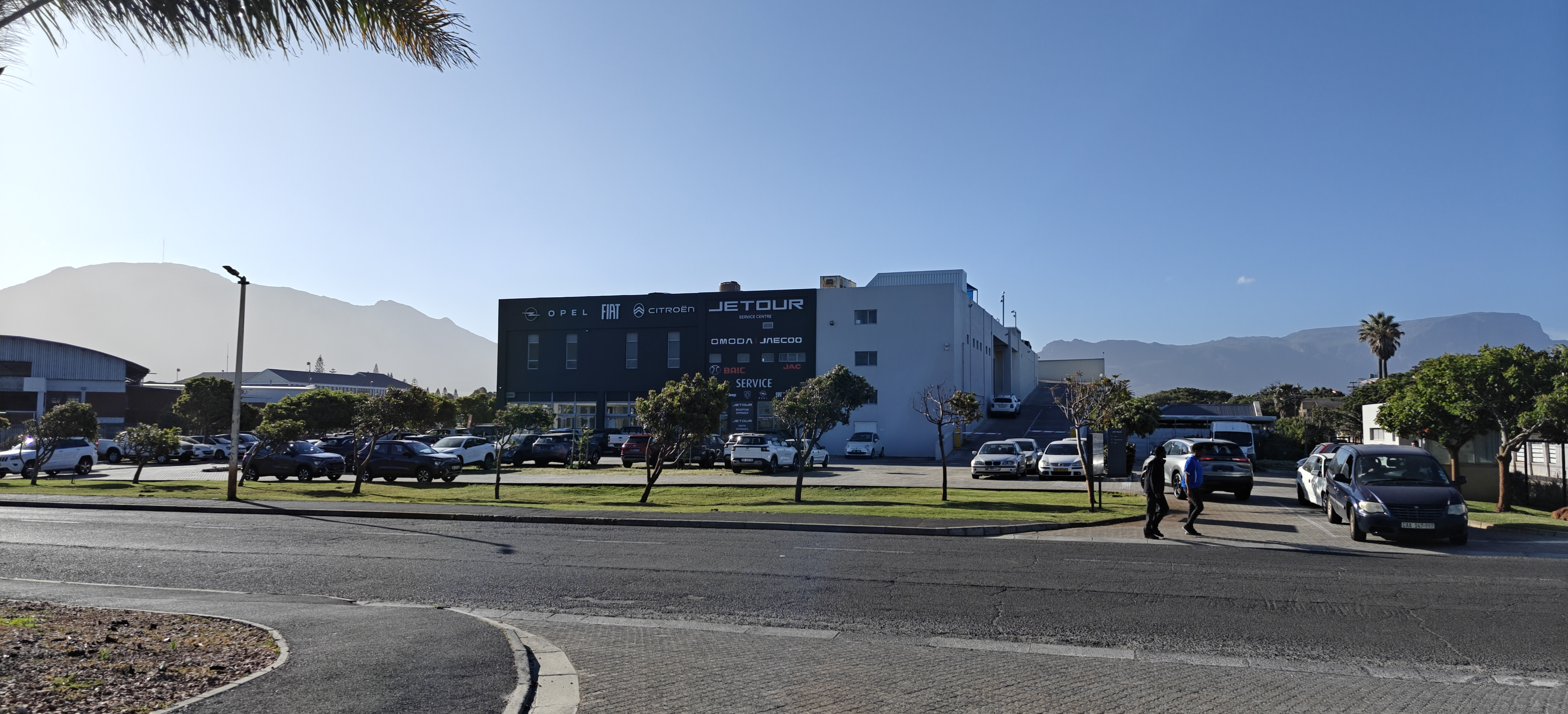
Jetour service center in Tokai, Cape Town

October 2025 was a historic month for the SA automotive industry, with multiple announcements about new local vehicle construction and new brand launches, many of which were driven by Chinese automakers.

In October 2025, it was reported that the number of affordable, preowned EVs was becoming more common in the South African market. These included preowned BMW i3, GWM Ora 03 and 04, BYD Atto 3, Volvo XC40, Volvo EX30, and Mercedes EQA and EQB models. More affordable models were also being introduced into the new EV market, such as the BYD Dolphin Surf.

Also in October, it was reported that driving an EV (using exclusively electricity straight from the South African grid with home charging), equated to roughly half the cost per kilometer (using the most expensive electricity pricing) than driving a gas-powered vehicle, or better. Using data from the International Energy Agency and its own tests, news outlet MyBroadband calculated an average cost per km of fuel ranging from R1.53 to R1.60, compare to an average cost per km of electricity ranging from R0.64 to R0.80.

Furthermore, two Chinese automakers announced that they were investigating the commencement of manufacturing vehicles in South Africa. GWM, which offers the Haval and Tank brands, expected sales to grow by 20% in 2026, and was considering jointly manufacturing pickup trucks in SA. Meanwhile, Chery, which offers its own-branded vehicles as well as the Omoda, Jetour, and Jaecoo brands, was on track to double sales in 2025.

Around the same time, Stellantis announced it was progressing with its SA knock-down facility, which was originally announced in 2023. While the final product mix is yet to be announced, the company stated that it intends to expand its locally-manufactured range beyond just pickup trucks. SA production is scheduled to begin in the second half of 2027.

In early October 2025, Chinese automaker Foton rolled out its first vehicle at its Foton SA plant at the complete knock-down (CKD) BAIC factory in the Coega Special Economic Zone, near Gqeberha. The first vehicle was a pre-production Tunland G7 pickup, future units of which will be sold in SA, as well as exported to other African countries. This achievement made it the first time a Chinese commercial auto company established full-scale vehicle manufacturing operations in South Africa.

The SA-bound Jaecoo J8 PHEV received a positive local review. It joins its Omoda C9 PHEV Chery Tiggo 9 PHEV brethren in the local market.

Jetour launched its T1 and T2 outdoor-focused models in the SA market in October, to complement its existing Dashing and X70 Plus vehicles.

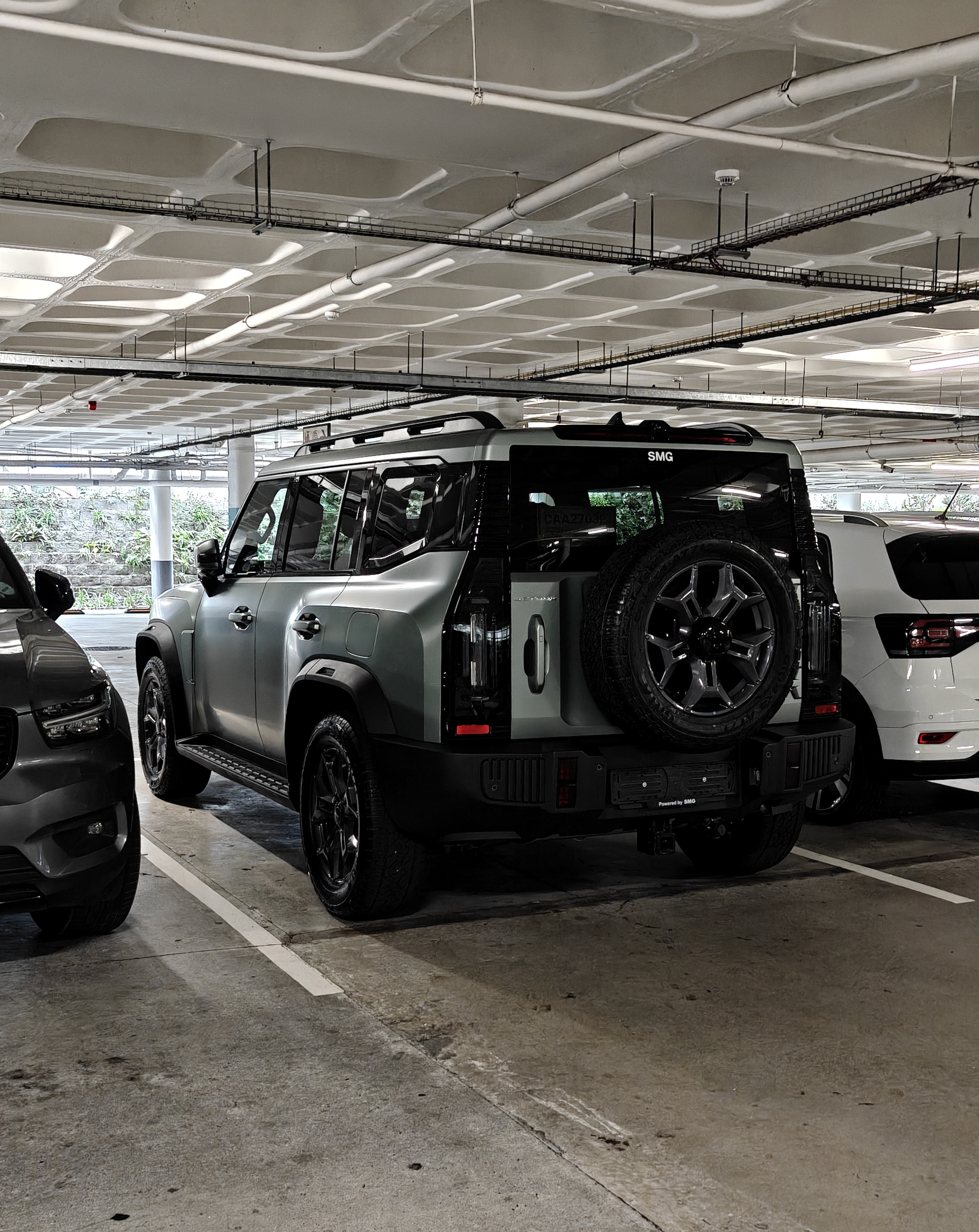
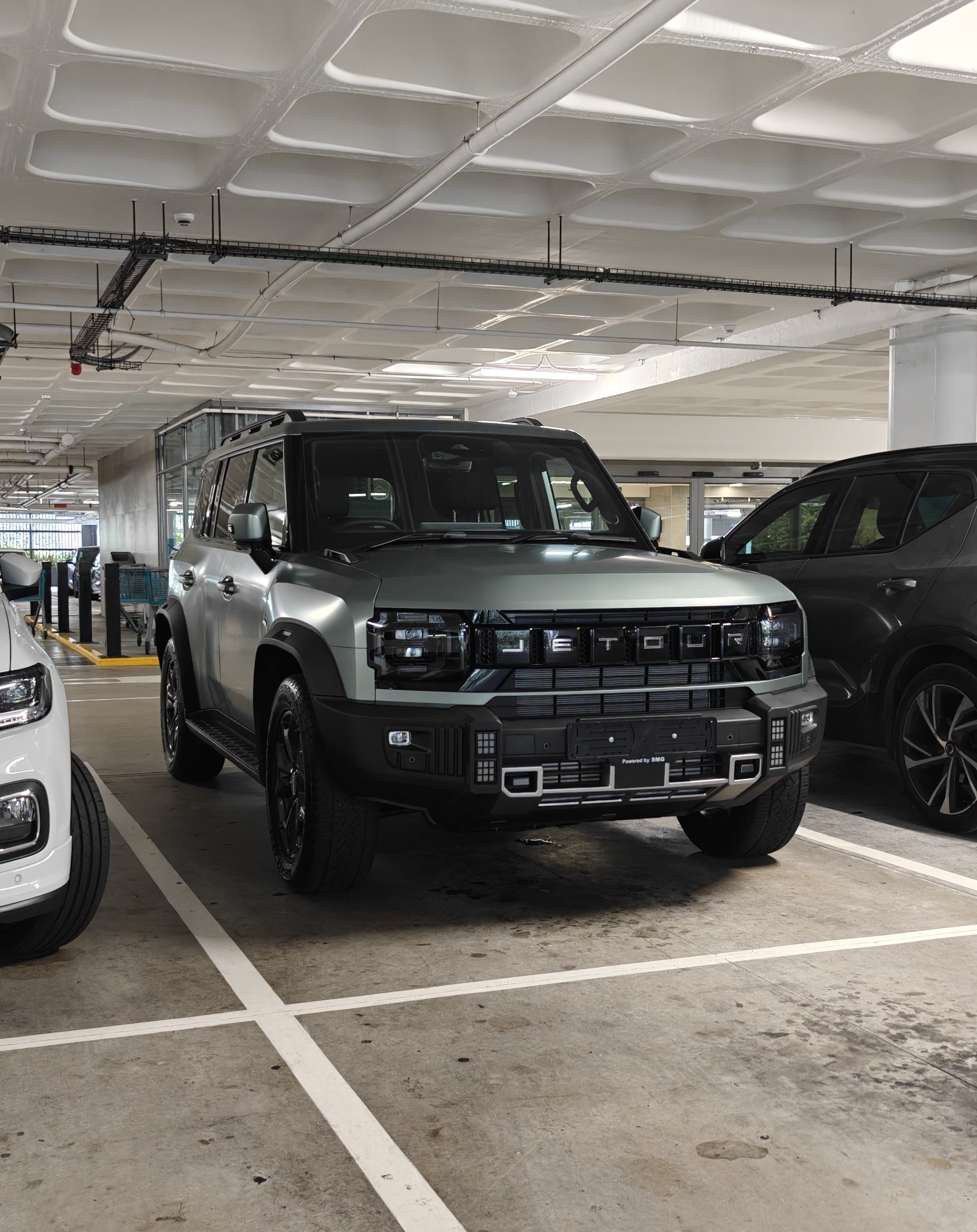
Rear and front of a new Jetour T2 in Constantia,
Cape Town, in February 2026

Stellantis-owned Alfa Romeo introduced its Junior compact crossover to the South African market, in Electtrica and Veloce variants, both fully-electric.

Chinese brands Omoda and Jaecoo (both owned by Chery) announced that, combined, they achieved an increase in sales in Q3 of 2025 of 26% above Q2, and 50% above Q1. The two automakers expected combined sales of 11,000 units by the end of the year. Q3 sales up to the October announcement totaled 4,408 Omoda C5, 204 Omoda C9, 557 Jaecoo J7, and 303 Jaecoo J5 models. The latter model only began sales in Q3 2025. These figures come after roughly two years in the SA market for Omoda, and approximately one year for Jaecoo.

After a 14 year absence, Chinese automaker Geely reentered the South African market in October 2025, launching at around 40 dealerships in the Western Cape, KwaZulu-Natal, and Gauteng. Its first model in SA is the EX5 compact crossover, offered in EV and hybrid variants. The brand anticipates selling 13,000 cars in 2026, increasing to 20,000 by 2028, when the brand aims to sell at 80 dealerships in SA.

Riddara, a sub-brand of Geely, also launched in SA in the same month. The brand launched with its RD6 Econ mid-size pickup, the entry-level model of which became the cheapest fully-electric pickup on sale in the country (priced at around 52% cheaper than the Maxus T90, the only other electric pickup in SA at the time). The higher-tier model of the RD6 competes in terms of acceleration with the far more expensive BYD Shark 6 plug-in hybrid pickup in SA. Both tiers of RD6 offer DC fast charging.

Chinese manufacturer Leapmotor officially went on sale in October, launching with its C10 SUV. Under a joint venture with Stellantis, Leapmotor vehicles will be sold as part of the Stellantis dealer network in SA. The C10 is South Africa's first range-extended electric vehicle (REEV).

Another new Chinese manufacturer launched in SA in October - Changan. The automaker launched alongside its EV sub-brand Deepal, with 25 dealerships across SA, as well as a parts warehouse in Gauteng. Models at launch were the Changan Alsvin sedan, CS75 SUV, and Hunter pickup, and the Deepal S07 crossover.

=== Recent developments ===
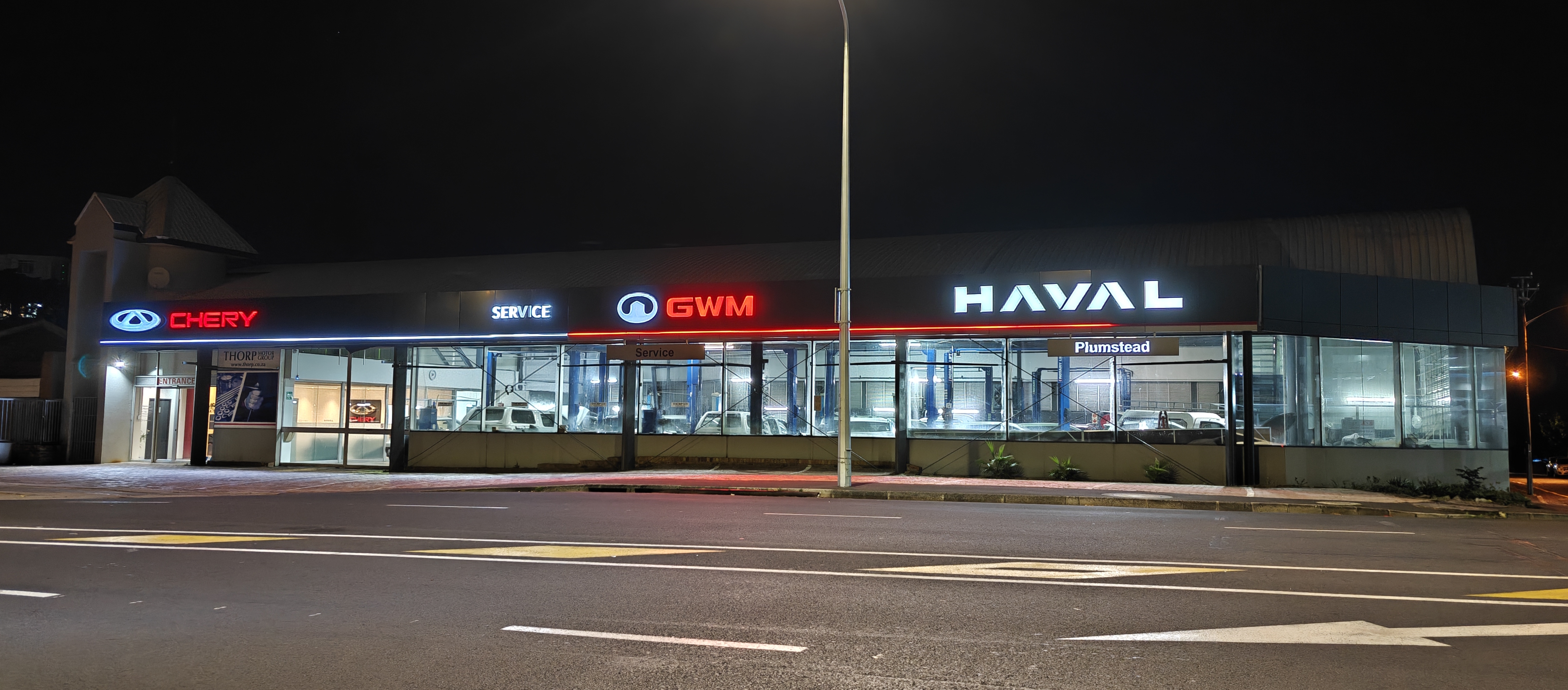
Chery-GWM-Haval service center in Cape Town

In November 2025, another new Chinese automotive brand launched in South Africa. Dongfeng opened its first SA dealership, in Pretoria, launching with its Dongfeng Box electric hatchback. Its launch price made it the second-cheapest EV in South Africa, after the BYD Dolphin Surf. The brand also confirmed it would sell its 06 SUV and 007 sedan in SA.

Despite already being SA's best-selling new passenger vehicle brand by a large margin, in January 2026, Toyota reported its best sales figure in 18 years in South Africa. Toyota sold a total of 148,124 vehicles in SA in 2025. The company closed the year with a market share of 24.8%, and attributed the success to its local manufacturing base, operated via Toyota South Africa Motors. The strongest performers in its lineup for 2025 were the locally-assembled Hilux, Corolla Cross, and Fortuner.

In January 2026, it was reported that South African car manufacturers would begin to receive tax incentives to produce new energy vehicles (NEVs), such as hybrids and EVs. From 1 March 2026, automakers would be able to reclaim tax equal to 150% of their investments into facilities and machinery for NEV manufacturing.

This followed years of lobbying by the automotive industry to the South African government, wherein manufacturers stated that the change would allow for SA to join the global shift towards NEVs.

The rolling out of the incentive follows its announcement by South African President Cyril Ramaphosa in 2024. It forms part of the Taxation Laws Amendment Act No. 42 of 2024, and is in keeping with the South African Government's commitment to transition the local automotive industry towards producing more NEVs, as published in the Electric Vehicles White Paper in November 2023.

Also in January 2026, automotive manufacturer Nissan announced that it intended to sell its Rosslyn manufacturing plant to Chery South Africa. If the deal was to receive regulatory approval, Chery would acquire the land, buildings, and equipment at the Rosslyn factory, as well as Nissan’s nearby stamping plant. The deal was intended to be finalized by mid-2026.

In January 2026, Chinese automaker Chery reported total sales in SA across all its brands (Chery, Jetour, Omoda, and Jaecoo) of 5,221 vehicles. This made it the third best-selling manufacturer in SA when all group brands are combined, beating VW Group for the first time, and coming close to second-place Suzuki. This was an improvement from December 2025, when Chery took the fourth best-selling group spot, ahead of Hyundai.

January's third-place performance was especially impressive considering the amount of time other manufacturers have been selling in SA, compared to Chery. The group's namesake brand entered the country in 2021, followed by Omoda in 2023, Jaecoo in early 2024, and Jetour in late 2024. Chery announced that it would launch two more brands in SA, both in 2026. Lepas will be launching in Q1, and iCaur in Q2.

The trend of Chinese and Indian brands gaining traction in the SA market in recent years may point to value-for-money being more important to many South Africans than brand recognition, when it comes to buying a car.

In March 2026, sales in the preowned hybrid vehicle category on major online car retail site AutoTrader had increased by 76% in 2025. This accompanied a 76% increase in used EV sales between 2023 and 2024, and a further 55% increase in the same category between 2024 and 2025.

In the same month, it was reported that South Africa's preowned passenger vehicle market had a total value of over R160 billion in 2025. The average preowned car sold that year was around five years old, had been driven approximately 73,646 kilometers, and sold for R417,584.

In March 2026, a SANRAL policy formalized public EV charging and battery swapping facilities, placing them in the same category as gas stations. Also, the South African Government stated that its whitepaper position is that all new and upgraded forecourts should include EV chargers.

In April 2026, Chery SA confirmed that it intended to begin manufacturing cars by the end of 2027, at the Rosslyn, Gauteng plant in South Africa that it planned to buy from Nissan, after modifications were complete. At the time, Chery sold around 50,000 vehicles per year in SA, and had around 150 dealers across the country.

In the same month, BYD released its South African sales data for the first time, after launching locally back in 2023. For the month of March, the company sold 589 vehicles, slotting in at 20th on Naamsa's list of best-selling passenger vehicle brands. This placed BYD above legacy brands like Honda, Mitsubishi, Mazda, Volvo, and Subaru. This was made more impressive by the fact that BYD does not sell any traditional gasoline- or diesel-only vehicles in SA, choosing instead to focus on hybrid and full EV models.

In April 2026, it was reported that a new record had been set for the total number of EVs sold in SA. March 2026 saw 389 EVs sold, which was a 289% increase from February 2026 and a 267% from March 2025. The top sellers ranking shifted, and BYD came out on top, with 316 units (83% of the total). Of those, 239 (76% of BYD EV sales and 61% of total EV sales) were its Dolphin Surf model, which was the cheapest EV on sale in SA at the time. Official pricing for the Surf was R339,900 for the Comfort trim and R389,900 for the Dynamic trim, with 2026 used models up to around 5% cheaper. Volvo came second with 32 EVs sold, followed by Changan and BMW tied for third, with 11 each.

In May 2026, it was announced that the Jetour T1 and T2 SUVs, which launched in SA in October of the same year, would be manufactured locally. The models will be produced at a Rosslyn manufacturing plant, which Jetour's parent company, Chery, acquired from Nissan's in January 2026. At the time of the announcement, Jetour had become one of SA's best-selling passenger vehicle brands. The company aims to enable production capacity of 50,000 vehicles per year at the Rosslyn plant.

In June 2026, newly-established Chinese auto manufacturer JuneYao Auto entered the South African market, with its fully-electric JY Air. The Air, which has a 51kWh battery and is capable of 70kW DC charging and a WLTP range of 355km, launched at an all-inclusive R599,000 retail price. A higher-trim Ultra model was set to arrive later, which would offer a 64kWh battery, 90kW charging speed, and WLTP range of 440km.

Also in June 2026, it was reported that there were a total of 22 Chinese automotive brands (including sub-brands) on sale in South Africa, with an additional four on the way. Of the existing brands, six were part of the Chery group. The four brands on the way to South Africa were Denza (BYD’s luxury division), and three Geely sub-brands - Zeekr, Riddara, and Farizon.

In July 2026, naamsa (SA's automotive business council) said that despite an increase in imported models from China and India available in the local market, the country's local manufacturing sector as a share of the total auto market had remained broadly unchanged. Furthermore, the motor industry more than doubled the economic value of local products between 2020 and 2026.

In the same month, Chinese auto manufacturer Chery South Africa confirmed that five models would be produced at its Rosslyn plant. These are the Jetour T1, Jetour T2, Jaecoo J5, Chery Tiggo Cross, and Lepas L4.

Also in July 2026, Geely-owned automaker Farizon announced it would be bringing its fully-electric SV commercial van to South Africa. The van would initially be sold locally as a single L1H1 variant, with a payload of 1,350 kg, a towing capacity of 2,000 kg, and a cargo capacity of 6.95 sqm. The company confirmed its L1H2 variant, with a larger cargo capacity, would be offered later. The initial L1H1 van uses a 67-kWh battery, offering a range of 302 km.

Later that same month, Toyota SA officially launched local production of its 9th generation Hilux. Toyota SA said that the R10.4 billion invested into the new vehicle's production in SA was the company's single largest product investment in its history. Toyota SA CEO Andrew Kirby acknowledged the thousands of South Africans whose skilled labor enables local Hilux production, and also recognized the over 100 local suppliers, and their employees, who also support its production. South African President Cyril Ramaphosa gave a virtual address celebrating the manufacturing commencement.

In August 2026, it was reported that Chery had overtaken GWM to become the best-selling Chinese automotive brand in SA, for new passenger vehicles. Selling 2,709 vehicles the month prior, Chery ranked as the 6th best-selling new passenger vehicle brand overall. When combining all of its marques, it was second only to Toyota group. With all marques combined, Chery group sold 6,245 vehicles, and this still excluded iCAUR and Lepas, which had not yet reported sales after launching in SA. In contrast, Toyota group's combined sales for July was 14,142 units, and third-place Suzuki's was 5,994.

== Registered vehicles ==
In December 2024, according to the RTMC, there were over 13.3 million (13,355,118) total registered vehicles in South Africa. This includes all types of vehicles. The total number of vehicles in SA had increased by 1.69% year-over-year.

Of those 13.3 million, there were approximately 7.94 million passenger vehicles (~60%), 2.72 light delivery vehicles (~20%), 398,000 trucks (~3%), 358,000 motorcycles (~3%), 420,000 buses and minibuses combined (~3%), and 1.26 million trailers of all types (~10%).

== Vehicle sales ==
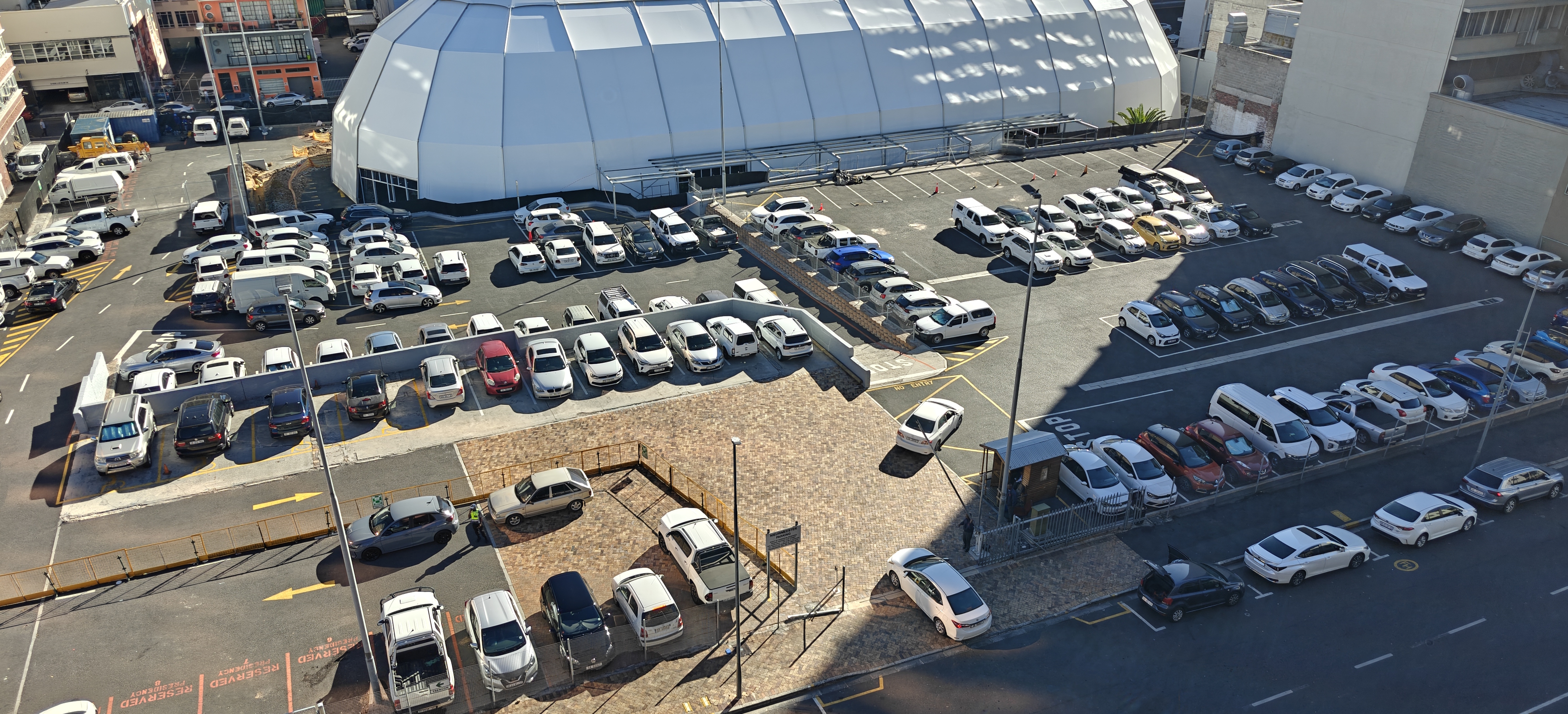
Parking lot in Cape Town CBD, showing ratio of white vehicles to other colours. White is the most popular car colour in SA, by a significant margin

According to the South African Automotive Business Council (naamsa), in 2025, total new vehicle sales in the country totaled 596,818, a 15% increase year-on-year. Vehicle sales by category are as follows:

New vehicle sales in South Africa
Year	Passenger	Light commercial	Medium commercial	Heavy Trucks, and Buses	Total combined sales
2020	246,541	110,912	6,735	16,018	380,206
2021	304,338	133,078	7,520	19,555	464,491
2022	363,682	135,711	8,308	21,841	529,542
2023	347,379	151,490	8,252	24,654	531,775
2024	351,302	133,254	7,714	23,442	515,712
2025	422,292	143,637	8,151	22,738	596,818

Export sales in 2025 totaled 408,224; an increase of 4,4% year-over-year. Historical export sales figures are as follows:

Export vehicle sales in South Africa
Year	Passenger	Light commercial	Trucks and Buses	Total export sales
2020	178,788	91,942	557	271,287
2021	173,773	123,667	748	298,188
2022	238,631	112,312	1,048	351,991
2023	258,265	140,529	1,014	399,808
2024	274,627	115,452	1,050	391,129
2025	252,601	153,855	1,768	408,224

=== Top-selling brands ===
The top-selling new vehicle brand in South Africa is Toyota, by a significant margin. Toyota consistently sells almost double the number of vehicles as the runner-up. Of the 42,401 new vehicles sold in South Africa in April 2025 (an increase of 11.9% year-over-year), Toyota had around a quarter (24%) of the market share. In September 2026, Toyota had approximately 25% market share. Sales figures by brand for that month are below.

10 best-selling new vehicle brands in South Africa
Manufacturer	October 2026	Monthly change
Toyota	14,495	▼871
Suzuki	7,292	▲624
Volkswagen Group (combined)	6,515	▲547
Ford	3,353	▲163
Hyundai	3,207	▲150
GWM	2,919	▲219
Chery	2,754	▼250
Kia	2,233	▲393
Isuzu	2,123	▼899
Jetour	2,102	▲66
Total sales *	61,890	▲5,839

* Including all other brands

=== Top-selling new models ===
In August 2025, the best-selling new passenger vehicle in South Africa was the Toyota Corolla Cross, which was competitively-priced in part due to its local manufacture. The Corolla Cross compact SUV moved quickly up the top-10 list since it launched in SA. The 3 best-selling passenger vehicles in South Africa accounted for almost half (47%) of the sales in the top-10 list.

Toyota vehicles accounted for four of the top-ten best-selling vehicles in September 2026, with 4th, 5th, 7th and 9th place. The best-selling passenger vehicles are in the table below.

10 best-selling new passenger vehicle models in South Africa
Vehicle	September 2026
Volkswagen Polo Vivo	2,534
Chery Tiggo 4 Cross	2,251
Suzuki Swift	2,012
Toyota Corolla Cross	1,964
Toyota Starlet	1,573
Hyundai Grand i10	1,493
Toyota Starlet Cross	1,478
Haval Jolion	1,351
Toyota Urban Cruiser	1,328
Suzuki Ertiga	1,270

=== Top-selling preowned vehicles ===
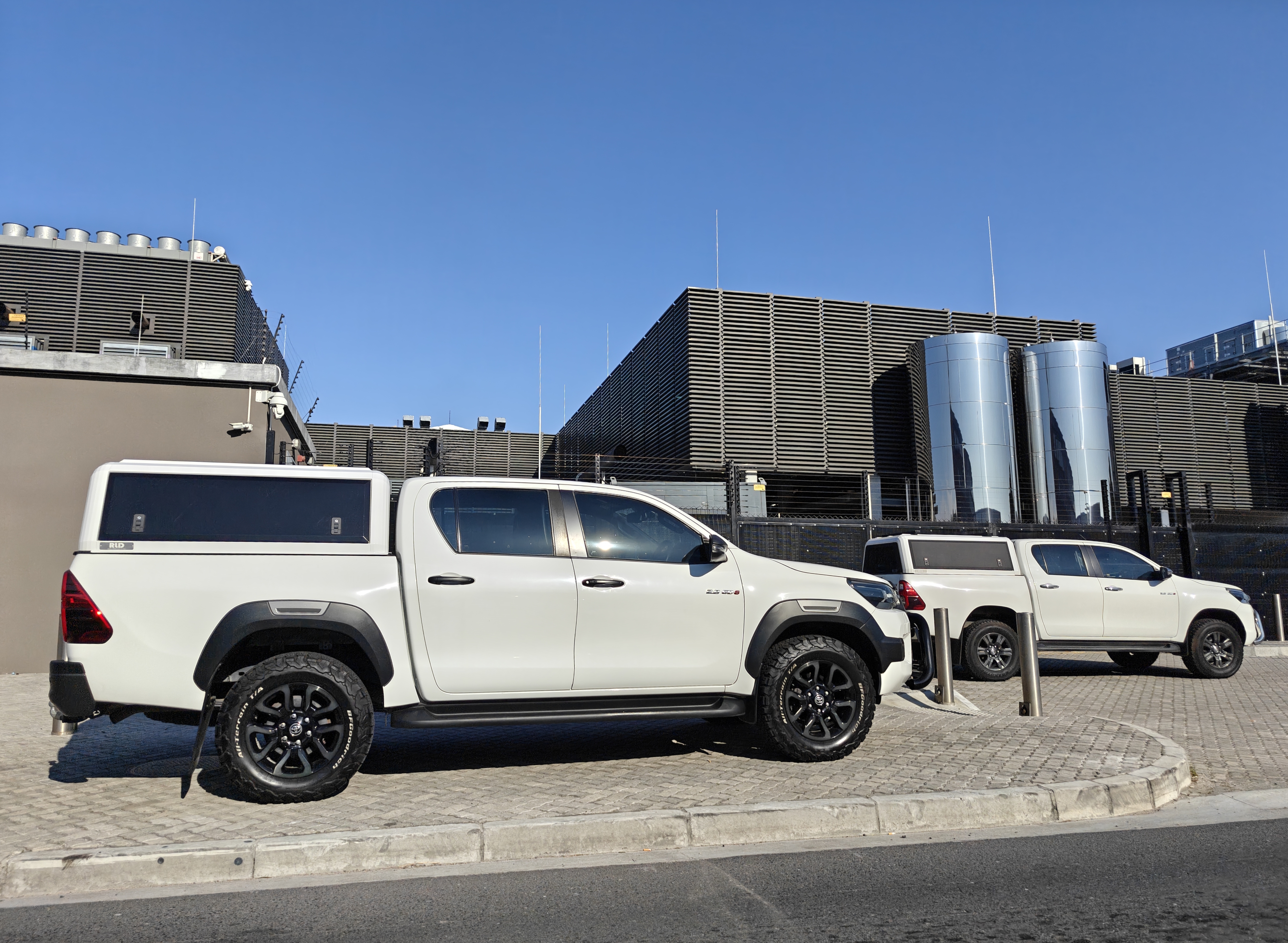
Toyota Hiluxes in Cape Town. The Hilux has consistently been one of the best-selling preowned passenger vehicles in SA

In August 2025, around 10,000 preowned passenger vehicles were sold in South Africa. The best-selling amongst those was the Ford Ranger pickup ("bakkie"), by a notable margin. Toyota performed strongly once again, holding 2nd, 5th, 9th, and 10th places in the top-10 list. The average price of a preowned vehicle sold in that month, amongst the top-10, was R339,422.

In contrast to new passenger vehicle sales, cars in the preowned list trend larger, potentially denoting a preference for larger vehicles in the South African market, but a desire or necessity for many to wait for prices to reduce from retail to preowned values before purchasing. Sales figures for the top-selling preowned passenger vehicles according to AutoTrader's data in SA are below.

10 best-selling preowned passenger vehicle models in South Africa
Vehicle	August 2026
Ford Ranger	1,990
Toyota Hilux	1,589
VW Polo Vivo	1,226
VW Polo	1,122
Suzuki Swift	874
Toyota Fortuner	720
Toyota Corolla Cross	593
Isuzu D-Max	556
Hyundai Grand i10	532
Toyota Starlet	514

=== Top-selling alternative fuel vehicles ===
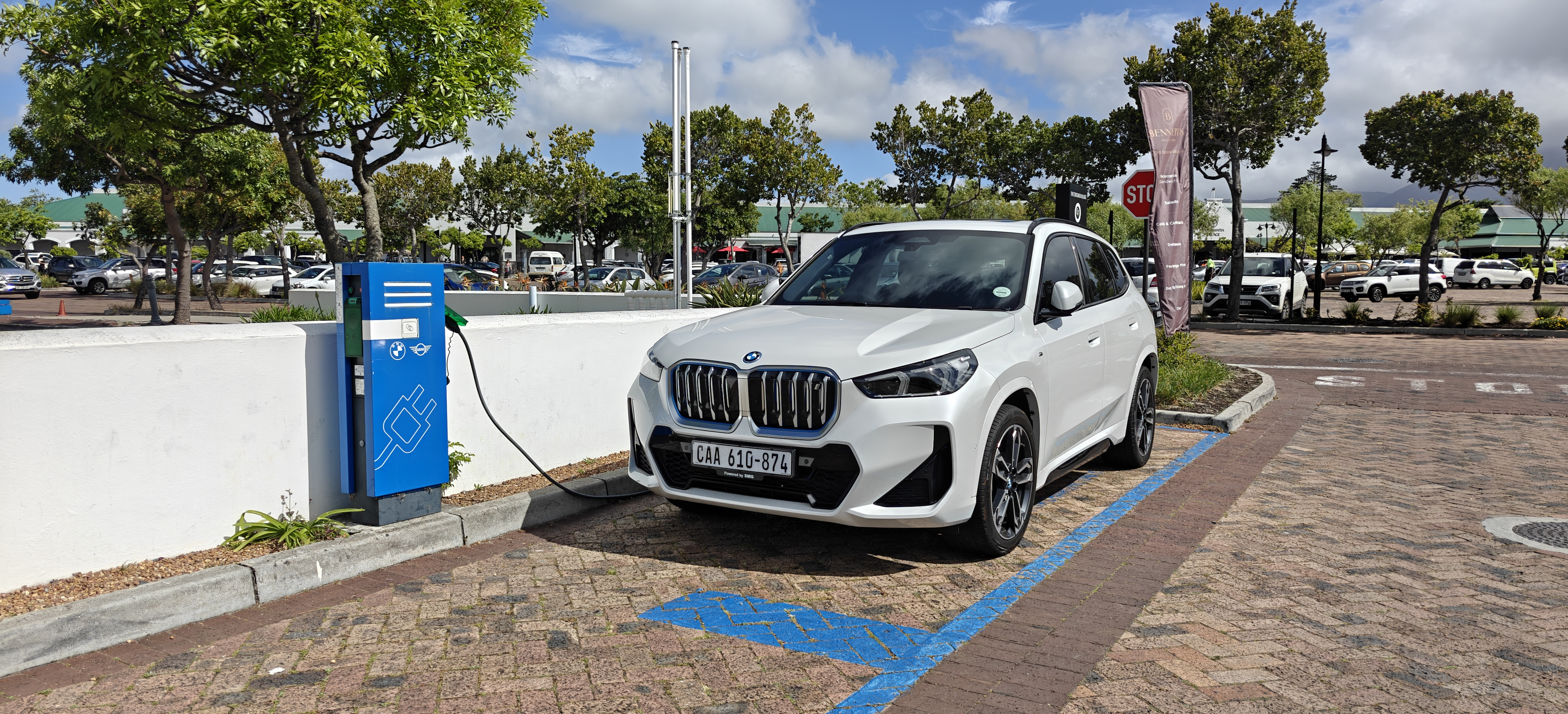
BMW iX1 EV at a charging station in Constantia, Cape Town

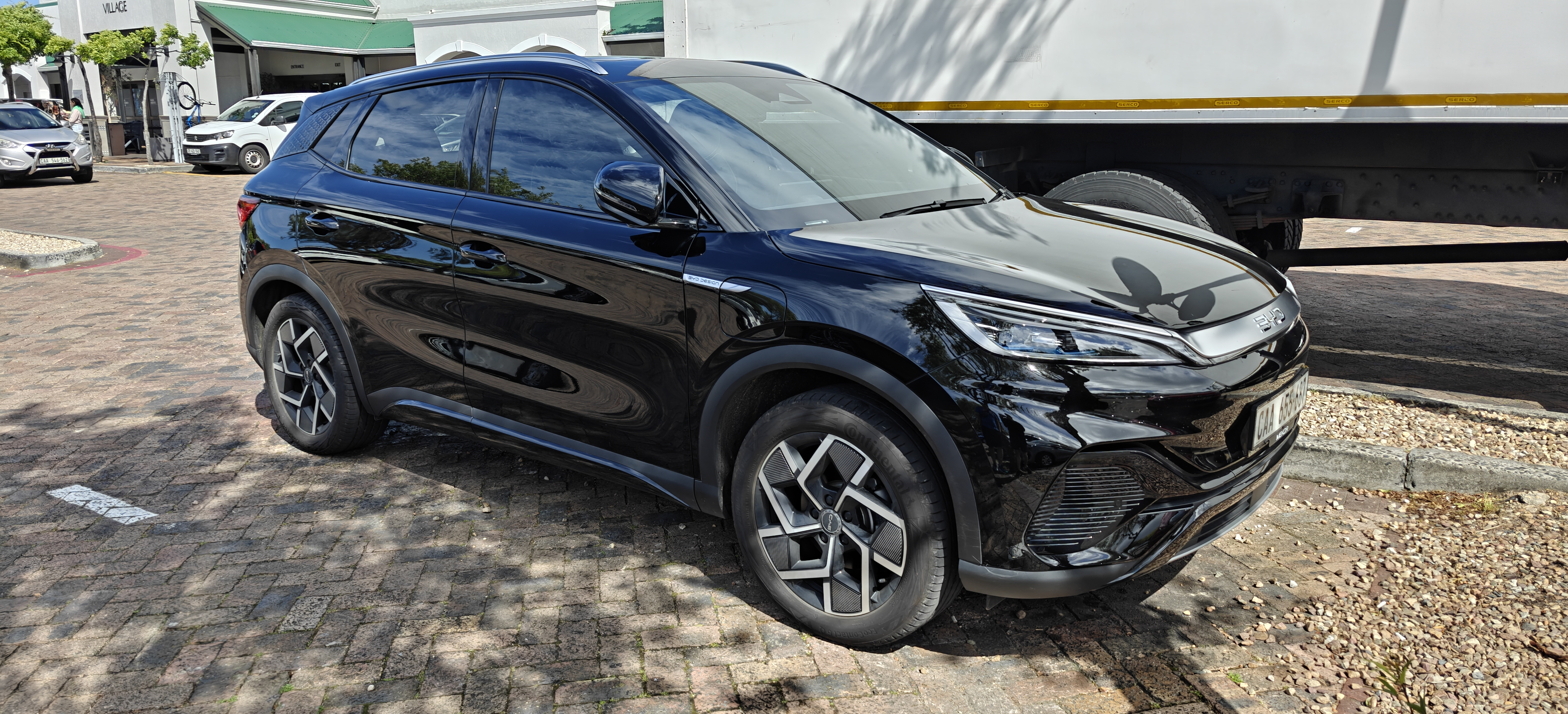
BYD ATTO 3 EV in Cape Town

The market for hybrids and EVs in South Africa is growing, as is the country's charging infrastructure. Since the introduction of the BYD Dolphin Surf in September 2025, as well as the increase in the price of petrol since the 2026 Iran War, electric vehicle sales have increased rapidly.

Notably, as of August 2025, 36% of new Toyota Corolla Cross models sold are hybrids. The Corolla Cross has 74% of the South African new hybrid vehicle market share. Sales figures for August 2025 for the top-selling hybrids, plug-in hybrids (PHEVs), and EVs in SA are below.

Best-selling new traditional hybrid vehicle models in South Africa
Vehicle	April 2026
Toyota Corolla Cross	499
Chery Tiggo 4 Cross	179
Omoda C5 143 49
BAIC B30	52
Haval Jolion	51
Total sales	1,058

Best-selling new plug-in hybrid vehicle (PHEV) models in South Africa
Vehicle	April 2026
Haval H6	164
BYD Sealion 6	148
BYD Shark 6	108
Chery Tiggo 7	105
BYD Sealion 5	90
Total sales	1,019

Best-selling new electric vehicle (EV) models in South Africa
Vehicle	October 2026
Chery Q	438
BYD Dolphin Surf	248
BYD Atto 2	182
BAIC ArcFox T1	43
Volvo EX30	35

The table above excludes a number of brands. Geely, which offer the Geely E2, South Africa's cheapest electric vehicle, Dongfeng and iCaur do not report official sales figures.

==== Preowned hybrids (combined) ====
During the first 6 months of 2025, major South African automotive sales site, AutoTrader, 1,504 preowned hybrid passenger vehicles were sold. Among those, 1,158 (%) were Toyotas (of which the Corolla Cross was the top seller by a significant margin). A further 45 were Lexuses.

The average sold price of a used hybrid car on the website during the same period was R696,169, representing a 3% increase from the R678,669 average a year before. All vehicles in the list were either 2024 or 2023 models (i.e., under 2 years old). The top-selling preowned hybrid passenger vehicles on AutoTrader SA, for the first 6 months of 2025, are in the table below.

10 best-selling preowned hybrid passenger vehicle models in South Africa
Manufacturer	January through June 2025
Toyota Corolla Cross	700
Toyota RAV4	177
Toyota Hilux	120
Haval H6	107
Toyota Corolla	96
Haval Jolion	80
Toyota Fortuner	65
GWM Tank 300	62
Volvo XC90	52
Lexus NX	45
Total sales	1,504

== Vehicle colour popularity ==
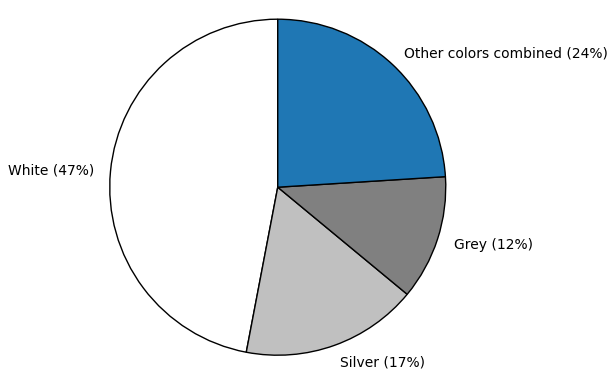
The most popular passenger vehicle colours in South Africa in 2023

At 47% of AutoTrader passenger vehicle searches (new and used vehicles), white is the most popular vehicle colour in South Africa, by a significant margin. This is followed by silver at 17%, and then gray at 12%. These three colours accounted for a combined 76% of AutoTrader's vehicle search results in 2023.

== Petrol stations ==
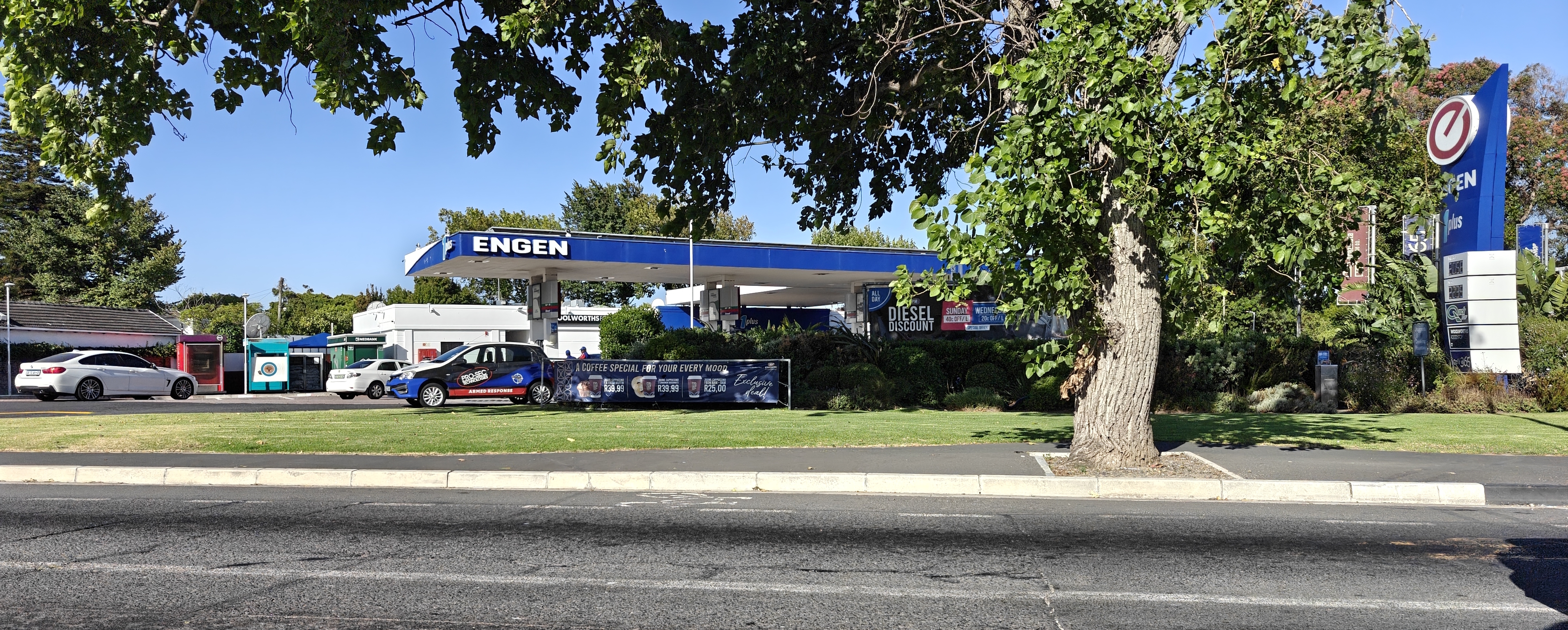
Engen gas station in Bergvliet, Cape Town

There are 4,000 petrol stations across South Africa, run by multiple competing local and foreign companies, some of which are also involved in petroleum refinement and chemical manufacturing in the country.

Major companies operating retail petrol stations in South Africa are below. Total location numbers are as of 2025.

=== Local companies ===
- Engen, which is headquartered in Cape Town, and is SA's largest petrol station chain (1,040 locations)
- Sasol, which is headquartered in Sandton, and has a smaller presence (354 locations)

=== Foreign companies ===
- Astron Energy, owned by Glencore (850 locations)
- Shell, which is in the process of being acquired by ADNOC (591 locations)
- BP (500 locations)
- Total (547 locations)
- Puma Energy, which has the smallest presence (118 locations)

=== Extraction and refining ===
PetroSA is the national oil and fuel company of South Africa, and is focused on natural gas extraction and production of synthetic fuels, as well as crude oil extraction.

The country has two crude oil refineries in operation. The larger of the two is the inland Natref Refinery, located in Sasolburg, in the Free State. It is a joint venture between Sasol and UK-based Prax Group that produces approximately 90% "white petroleum products", and most notably jet fuel for use in Gauteng.

The country's other major operational refinery is the Astron Energy Refinery in Cape Town, which is wholly owned by Astron Energy. It produces a mix of petroleum-derived products, including gasoline, fuel oil, diesel, jet fuel, LPG, and marine fuel.

=== Other sector players ===
The interests of the industry in SA are represented by the Fuels Industry Association of South Africa (FIASA), of which the aforementioned companies are all members.

== EV charging ==
=== At-home charging ===
At-home alternating current (AC) charging can be done using two methods; standard plug sockets or dedicated, wall-mounted chargers (for faster charging speeds).

SA operates a 230V electricity network, and regular outlets are limited to 16A, as per SANS-164 and newer SANS 164-2 standards.

For a regular power outlet, charging is therefore limited to 3.7 kW (with the exact number depending on the amperage of the socket).

Dedicated at-home EV chargers are available locally with speeds ranging from 7.4 kW to 22 kW. These require the installation of a dedicated a connection supporting over 16A of current (i.e., an "industrial outlet").

=== Public charging infrastructure ===
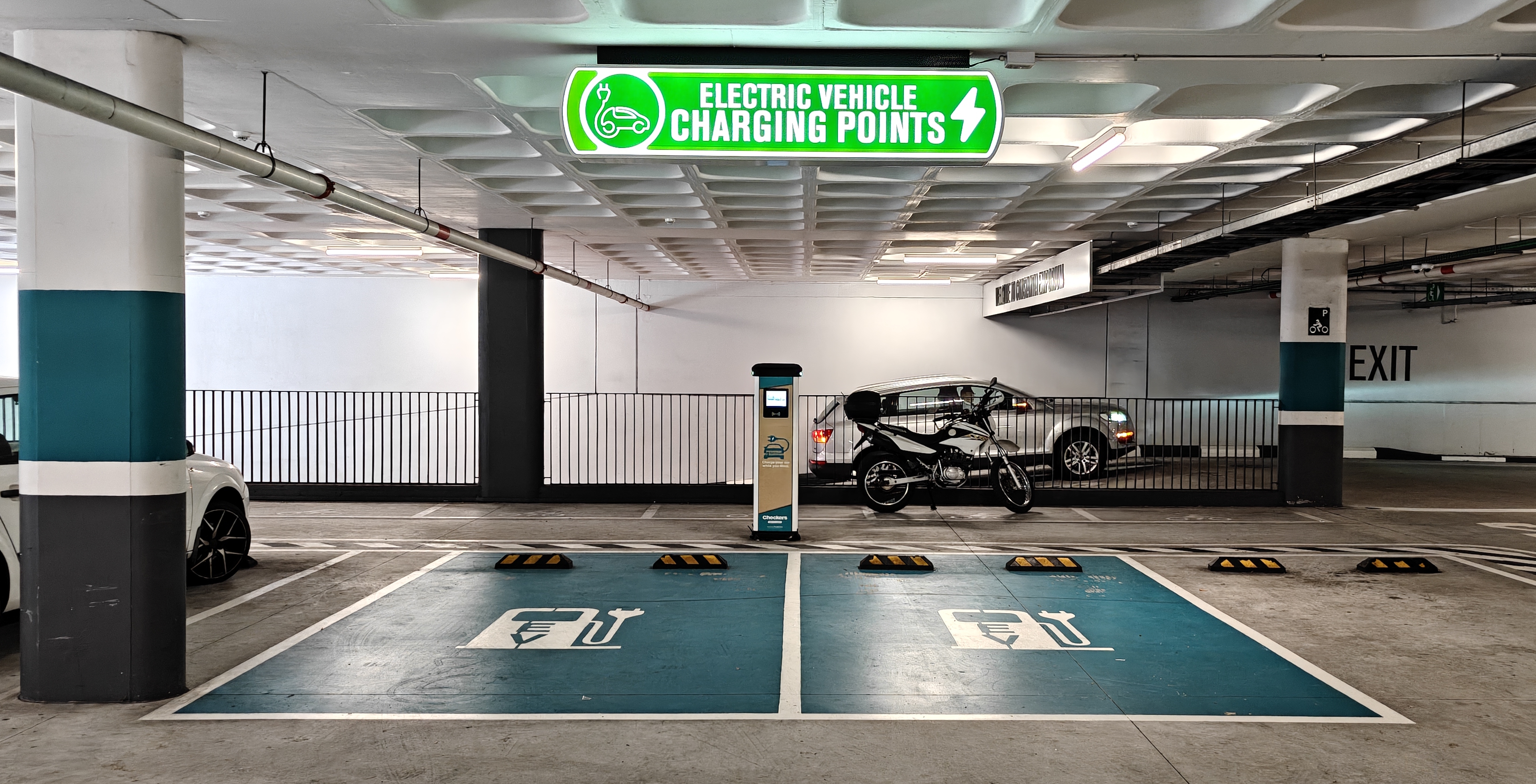
Public EV charger in the covered parking area of Constantia Emporium, in Constantia, Cape Town

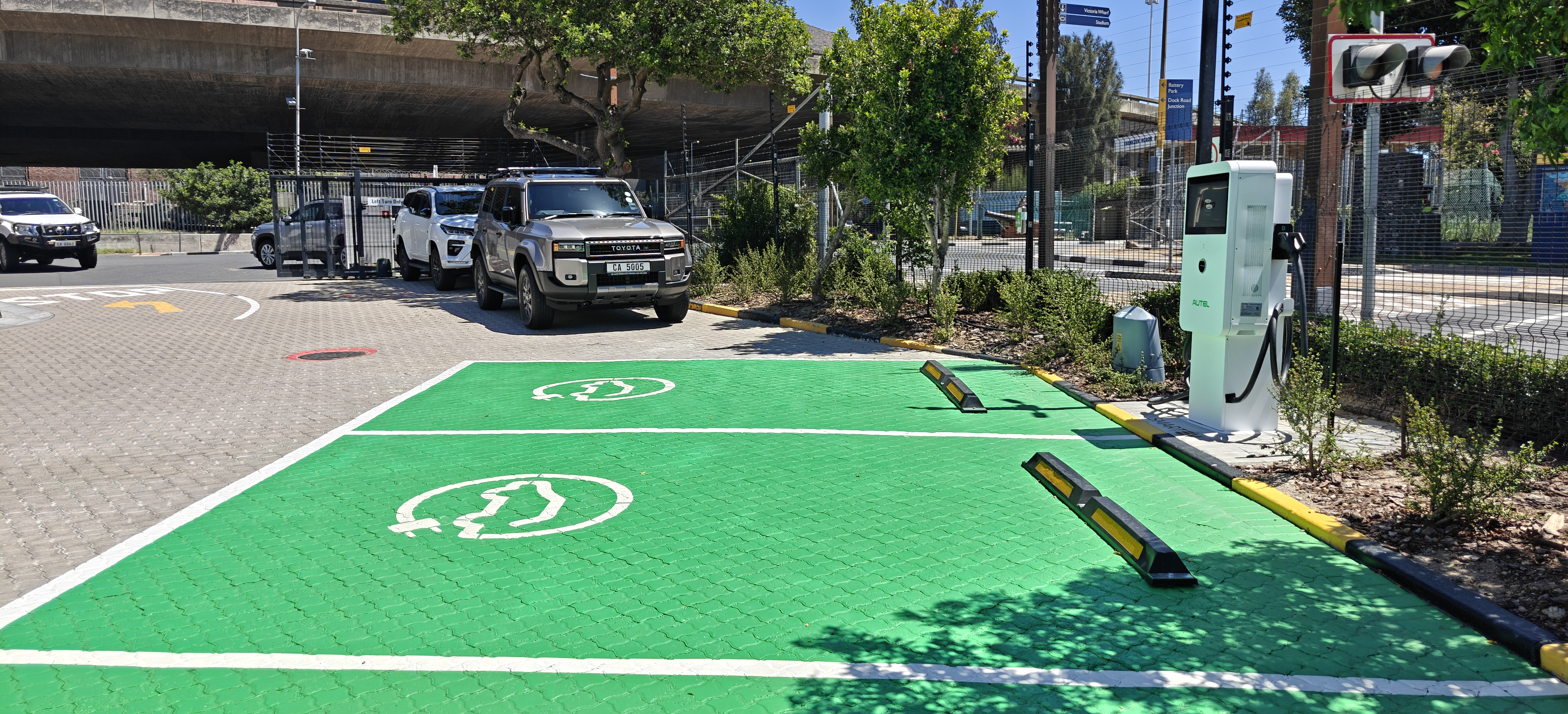
Newly-installed EV charging stations at the Lexus and Toyota Cape Town City dealership, in February 2026

South Africa has a small, but growing EV charging station network. There is no direct government infrastructure spending on EV charging, and SA therefore has a patchwork of private charging sites. Investment in infrastructure is increasing.

As of October 2025, there are at least 500 public EV chargers across South Africa, roughly 70% of which are operated by local company GridCars.

The majority of chargers are located in and around the metros of Cape Town, Durban, and Johannesburg.

Numerous proof of concept high-capacity DC chargers are installed at various sites across SA, including the three 400 kW chargers at Charge's N12 North West facility, the 200 kW station at the Mall of Africa in Midrand, and the 150 kW one at Canal Walk in Cape Town.

The cost of installing a charging station is estimated to be between R500,0000 and R2 million. To reach profitability, SA will need around 100,000 EVs on the road.

As of 2025, there are around 3,500 new EVs sold per year in South Africa. Sales are expected to grow steadily, as new models are introduced into the market. At the same time, the industry was estimated to already be worth R2.8 billion.

The country's charging network comprises, among other initiatives, the following operators. The list is ranked from largest to smallest number of currently active chargers.

- GridCars' DC fast-charging network across SA
  - Active charging stations: 350+
  - Planned charging stations: Unknown
- Rubicon
  - Active charging stations: 100
  - Planned charging stations: Unknown
- Chargify
  - Active charging stations: 30
  - Planned charging stations: Unknown
- Black Tower Energy (partnership between RMB and Red Rocket)
  - Active charging stations: 12
  - Planned charging stations: 80+ in 2026
- Charge's network of solar-powered stations, with R100 million investment from the Development Bank of Southern Africa
  - Active charging stations: 1
  - Planned charging stations: 120 for passenger vehicles (at 150 km intervals, along major highways), and a further 120 for electric trucks
- BYD's Super e-Platform Megawatt Flash Chargers, with solar power and battery energy storage systems
  - Active charging stations: 0
  - Planned charging stations: Between 200 and 300 in 2026, with more thereafter
- Eskom and BYD's partnered public chargers
  - Active charging stations: 0
  - Planned charging stations: 55 by the end of 2027
- National Automobile Association of South Africa (NAASA)
  - Active charging stations: 0
  - Planned charging stations: 100 between the end of 2030 and 2032

== Manufacturing ==
South African factories have built motor vehicles and light truck models since the 1920s. Manufacturers have historically been concentrated in the provinces of the Eastern Cape, Gauteng, and KwaZulu-Natal.

The modern automotive industry in South Africa was launched in 1995, and has since provided a large number of exports to countries around the world. Over the years, numerous global automotive manufacturers have granted production licenses to South African factories. Companies producing in South Africa can take advantage of low production costs, as well as access to new markets as a result of trade agreements, such as those established with the European Union (EU) and the Southern African Development Community (SADC).

Large component manufacturers with bases in the country include Arvin Exhaust, Bloxwitch, Corning, and Senior Flexonics. There are also around 200 automotive component manufacturers in South Africa, and more than 150 others that supply the industry on a non-exclusive basis.

The Department of Trade and Industry's Motor Industry Development Programme (MIDP), which ran from 1995 to 2012, provided a major boost to auto manufacturing in South Africa. Its successor was the Automotive Production and Development Programme (APDP), which is still in place to incentivize local manufacturing.

=== Current manufacturing ===
Below are tables showing the current vehicles manufactured in South Africa, inclusive of planned models. The first table is for passenger vehicles, while the second is for commercial vehicles.

==== Passenger vehicle manufacturers ====
Manufacturer	Parent company	Local facilities	Local headquarters	Began in South Africa	Models produced	Planned models	Manufacturing type
BMW South Africa	BMW	BMW Group Plant Rosslyn, Rosslyn, Gauteng	Midrand, Gauteng	1968; 58 years ago	BMW X3 (G45; including internal combustion and plug-in hybrid variants)	None announced	Initially Complete knock down (CKD) assembly (1968–1973); full manufacturing since 1973
BAIC South Africa	BAIC Motor	BAIC South Africa Plant, Coega Special Economic Zone, Gqeberha, Eastern Cape	Johannesburg, Gauteng	July 24, 2018; 8 years ago	BAIC X55 Plus, BAIC B40, BAIC B30	None announced	Semi knocked down (SKD) assembly (X55 Plus and B40); Complete knock down (CKD) manufacturing (B30)
Chery South Africa	Chery	Chery Rosslyn Manufacturing Plant, Rosslyn, Gauteng	Johannesburg, Gauteng	2027; 1 year's time	None	Jetour T1, Jetour T2, Jaecoo J5, Chery Tiggo Cross, Lepas L4	Planned CKD manufacturing
Ford Motor Company of Southern Africa	Ford Motor Company	Silverton Assembly Plant, Silverton, Gauteng; Struandale Engine Plant, Gqeberha, Eastern Cape	Pretoria, Gauteng	1923; 103 years ago	Ford Ranger (internal combustion and plug-in hybrid variants), Ford Everest, Volkswagen Amarok (second generation)	None announced	Full manufacturing
Isuzu Motors South Africa	Isuzu	Struandale Manufacturing Plant, Struandale, Gqeberha, Eastern Cape	Gqeberha, Eastern Cape	January 1, 2018; 8 years ago	Isuzu D-Max, Isuzu Trucks	None announced	Full manufacturing (D-Max); CKD assembly (trucks)
Mahindra South Africa	Mahindra & Mahindra	Dube TradePort Assembly Facility, La Mercy, KwaZulu-Natal	Midrand, Gauteng	October 4, 2018; 8 years ago	Mahindra Pik Up	None announced	CKD assembly
Mercedes-Benz South Africa	Mercedes-Benz Group	Mercedes-Benz East London Plant, East London, Eastern Cape	Centurion, Gauteng	1958; 68 years ago	Mercedes-Benz C-Class (W206)	None announced	Full manufacturing
Toyota South Africa Motors	Toyota	Prospecton Plant, Prospecton, Durban, KwaZulu-Natal	Prospecton, Durban, KwaZulu-Natal	June 1962; 64 years ago	Toyota Corolla Cross (including Hybrid), Toyota Hilux, Toyota Fortuner, Toyota HiAce Ses'fikile	None announced	Full manufacturing
Volkswagen Group South Africa	Volkswagen Group	Kariega Plant, Kariega, Eastern Cape	Kariega, Eastern Cape	August 31, 1951; 75 years ago	Polo, Polo Vivo, Tengo	None announced	Full manufacturing

==== Commercial vehicle manufacturers ====
Manufacturer	Parent company	Local facilities	Local headquarters	Began in South Africa	Models produced	Planned models	Manufacturing type
Daimler Truck Southern Africa	Daimler Truck	East London Production Plant, East London, Eastern Cape	Centurion, Gauteng	1962; 64 years ago	Mercedes-Benz Trucks, Mercedes-Benz Buses, Fuso	None announced	CKD assembly
Isuzu Motors South Africa	Isuzu	Struandale Manufacturing Plant, Struandale, Gqeberha, Eastern Cape	Gqeberha, Eastern Cape	January 1, 2018; 8 years ago	Isuzu N-Series, F-Series, FX-Series and FY-Series trucks	None announced	CKD assembly
MAN Automotive South Africa	MAN Truck & Bus	Pinetown Plant, Pinetown, KwaZulu-Natal; Bus and Coach Plant, Olifantsfontein, Gauteng	Modderfontein, Gauteng	1968; 58 years ago	MAN medium-, heavy-, and extra-heavy trucks; MAN and Volkswagen truck chassis; MAN and Neoplan buses and coaches	None announced	Truck and bus chassis assembly; bus and coach manufacturing
Volvo Trucks South Africa	Volvo Trucks	Durban Plant, Umbogintwini, KwaZulu-Natal	Jet Park, Gauteng	2014; 12 years ago	Volvo FH, Volvo FM, Volvo FMX, Volvo FH Aero	None announced	KD assembly

=== Historical manufacturing ===
A number of other vehicle manufacturers used to produce cars in South Africa, but have since stopped. These include:

- FIAT, which closed its Rosslyn plant in 1978
- Nissan, which used to manufacture at its Rosslyn plant, until it was sold to Chery in 2026
- Stellantis, which began constructing a Coega plant and had plans to begin production in 2026, but then paused this

== Vehicle safety ==
Legislation around the safety of vehicles sold in South Africa is relatively lax, and the South African government permits vehicles to be sold in South Africa that would be prohibited in other markets due to poor safety. The nonprofit Automobile Association of South Africa (AASA) works with Global NCAP to lobby the government for better passenger vehicle safety standards, as well as to inform consumers about unsafe vehicles. AASA anonymously purchases entry-level vehicles and submits them for international GNCAP testing. A number of high-profile vehicles sold in South Africa have received zero stars in the GNCAP tests; the Hyundai Grand i10 and the Toyota Starlet.

The AA also operates vehicle inspection centers, issues international driving permits, and provides its members with a variety of other services.

== Government programs ==
Regulations for local content requirements first appeared in the 1960s and were quite strict, and led to a limited number of cars being available to South African motorists. Beginning in the late 1960s, engines had to be built locally for the car to be considered a local product.

Phase III of the requirements, for instance, was planned for introduction in the 1970s and required local content to reach 70 percent of a vehicle's total weight. Manufacturers also received tax rebates for additional local content. Early in the program, models were often sold as "declared manufactured", but the government gradually began enforcing the standards and imposing penalties.

The South African government has provided substantial support for the automotive industry in the past 20 years and is still identifying it as a key growth sector. In a Department of Trade and Industry (dti) Budget Vote Address delivered in July 2014, Trade Minister Rob Davies said that “given that automotive and component manufacturing comprises 30% of our industrial sector, with strong linkages to other manufacturing sub-sectors, the impact of such investment on our domestic economy is significant.”

The Department of Trade and Industry has provided a series of programs in order to assist the sector. The first of the programs—the Motor Industry Development Programme (MIDP)—was introduced in 1995. The program had the following key objectives:

- Improvement of the South African automotive industry's international competitiveness
- Improvement of vehicle affordability in the domestic market
- Encouragement of growth in vehicle and component manufacturing, mainly through exports
- Stabilizing the employment levels in the industry
- Creating a better foreign exchange balance in the industry

The program is considered a great success. Under the MIDP, the sector has been exhibiting significant growth – it almost doubled in size since 1994.

Its successor is the Automotive Production and Development Programme (APDP), which was implemented on January 1, 2013. The APDP's main goal is to simultaneously stimulate the expansion of local production to 1.2 million vehicles a year by 2020 and increase significantly the local content. The intention is to achieve this through investments, unlike the MIDP which relied mainly on exports. According to the National Association of Automotive Component and Allied Manufacturers (NAACAM), the program has four pillars:

- Import Duty
- Vehicle Assembly Allowance (VAA) BP
- Production Incentive (PI)
- Automotive Investment Scheme (AIS)

The fourth pillar is not a new initiative but a revised incentive. The Automotive Investment Scheme (AIS) was first introduced in 2010/2011, and, since then, incentives in the public sector have amounted to R6.3 billion and supported investments worth R23 billion by original equipment manufacturers in the automotive sector.

=== Electric vehicles ===
In October 2021, South African President Cyril Ramaphosa announced that the country would prioritize a shift to focusing on EV manufacturing.

As of 2024, South Africa has a small, growing electric vehicle market, but as yet, none are produced locally. Electric vehicles are increasing in popularity, as fuel prices have increased, and charging networks have expanded.

== Related companies ==
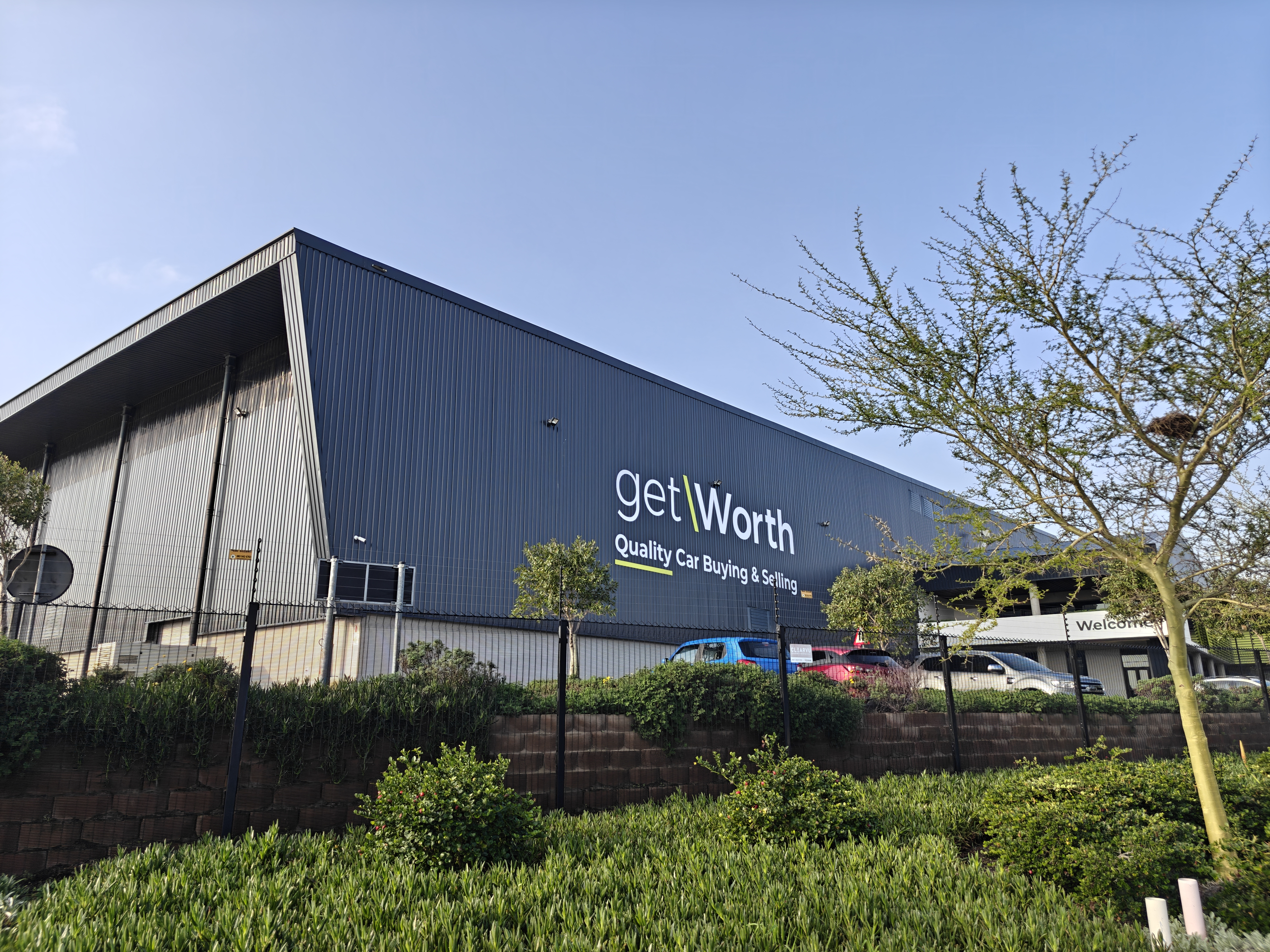
GetWorth headquarters and preowned vehicle warehouse in Cape Town

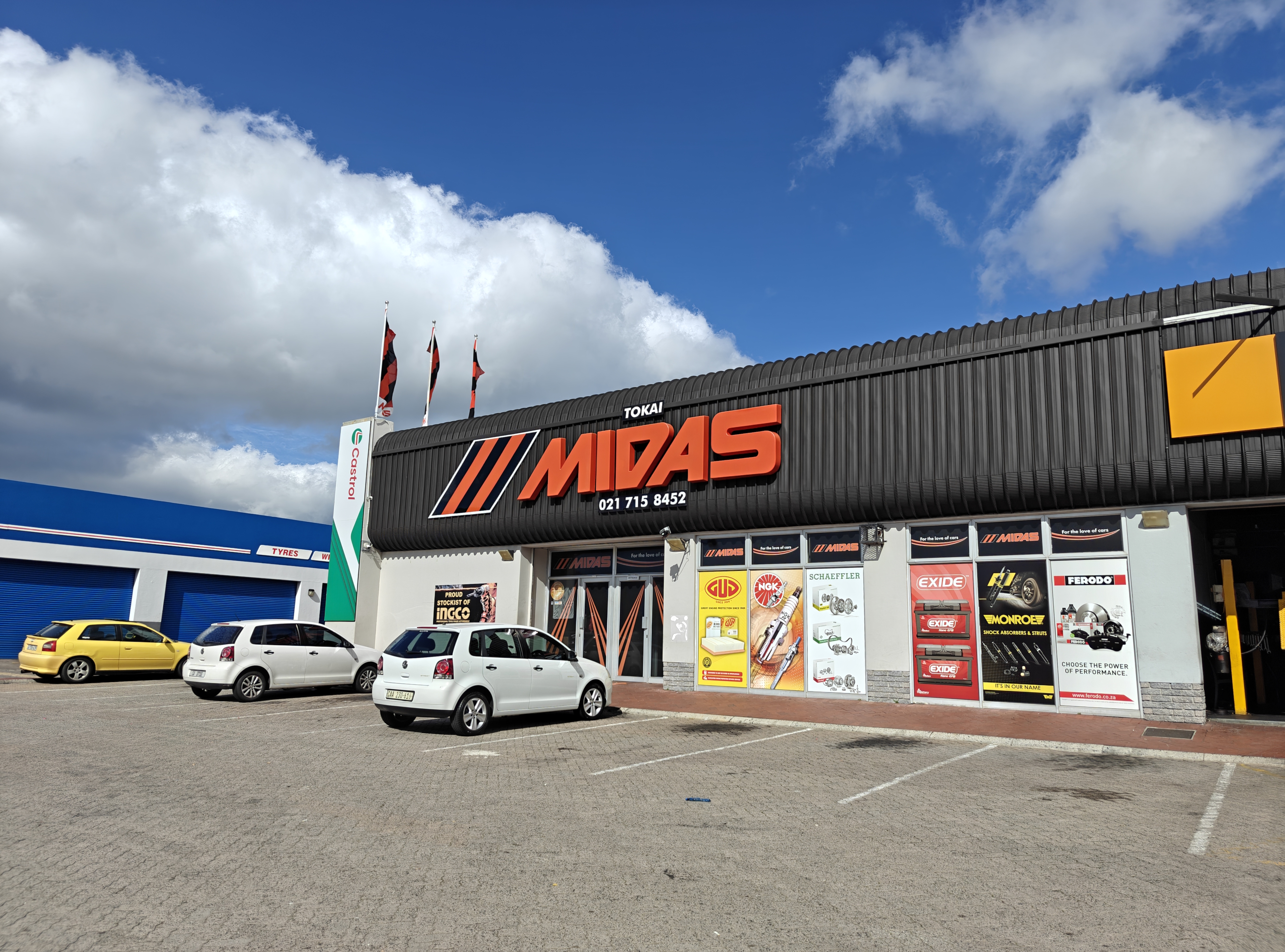
A Midas auto parts and accessories store in Cape Town

South Africa has numerous non-manufacturing automotive companies, including:

- WeBuyCars
- GetWorth
- Motus Holdings
- Imperial Truck Rental
- Midas
- Bidvest McCarthy
