= GWM South Africa =

South African automotive company

Haval Motors South Africa Pty Ltd
- Trade name: GWM South Africa
- Type: Subsidiary
- Industry: Automotive
- Incorporated: 2014; 12 years ago
- Founded: 2007; 19 years ago
- Headquarters: Midrand, Gauteng, South Africa
- Number of locations: 111 dealerships (2026)
- Area served: South Africa
- Products: Passenger vehicles
- Brands: Haval; GWM; Ora; Tank
- Services: Vehicle servicing
- Parent: Great Wall Motor
- Website: gwm.co.za

GWM South Africa, officially Haval Motors South Africa Pty Ltd, is a South African automotive company, and wholly owned subsidiary of Chinese automotive group Great Wall Motor. It is headquartered in Midrand, Gauteng.

Established in 2007, the company operates 111 dealerships across South Africa, as of 2026.

== History ==
Great Wall Motor (GWM) entered the South African market in 2007, initially operating through an independent local importer and distributor, Great Wall Motors South Africa (GWM SA). The first shipment of approximately 1,500 vehicles arrived at the Port of Durban on 25 February 2007. The initial range consisted of GWM pickup trucks and a multi-wagon model, with the pickup subsequently becoming known as the Steed 5.

GWM SA subsequently established a nationwide dealer network and became one of the largest Chinese automotive brands in the South African market.

By 2014, GWM SA had sold more than 50,000 vehicles in South Africa and operated a network of over 70 dealerships. In March that year, JSE-listed transport, logistics, and mobility company Super Group acquired a 50.1% stake in GWM SA, making it the majority shareholder of the local distributor.

In 2016, Chinese automaker GWM announced that it would take direct control of its South African distribution operation following the expiry of its agreement with GWM SA.

In 2017, the South African company changed its name to Haval Motors South Africa (HMSA), reflecting the introduction and growing importance of GWM's Haval SUV marque in the country. The operation remained a wholly owned subsidiary of Great Wall Motor, while continuing to distribute both Haval vehicles and GWM-branded pickups. The company subsequently expanded its Haval range and dealer network, with new models including the H1, H2, H6, H6C, and H9.

In 2022, GWM introduced the Haval H6 GT in SA, as well as some new NEVs, such as the H6 HEV, and Jolion HEV.

In 2023, the company invested in a larger parts distribution center in Midrand, Gauteng, to support its expanding dealer network and customer base.

In 2023, GWM SA announced plans to introduce the Tank and Ora brands to the South African market, with the Tank 300 and fully electric Ora 03 identified as forthcoming models. Ora launched in 2023 and Tank launched in 2024.

In February 2024, GWM SA announced a new corporate identity under which GWM would become the lead brand, with Haval, Ora, P300, and Tank positioned within the wider GWM portfolio. The company described the strategy as "One GWM". In August of that year, the company began operating as GWM South Africa. It retained its existing legal name.

In March 2026, GWM confirmed that it was considering local vehicle production in South Africa. The company was evaluating options including contract assembly with another manufacturer, and acquiring an existing manufacturing facility, after losing its bid for Nissan SA's former Rosslyn plant to Chery SA. At the time, GWM had not yet selected specific vehicles for local production.

== Vehicle lineup ==
As of 2026, GWM SA retails the following models:

=== Haval ===
- Haval H6, incl. H6 GT and H6 PHEV
- Haval H7
- Haval Jolion, incl. Jolion Pro

=== GWM ===
- GWM P300
- GWM P500
- GWM Steed 5

=== TANK ===
- Tank 300
- Tank 500

=== ORA ===
- Ora 03
- Ora 5

== See also ==
- Automotive industry in South Africa
- Manufacturing in South Africa
