= Charge (South Africa) =

South African EV charging operator

- Formerly: Zero Carbon Charge
- Type: Private
- Industry: Electric vehicle charging
- Founded: 2021; 5 years ago
- Founder: Andries Malberbe; Joubert Roux (Co-founders)
- Headquarters: Cape Town, South Africa
- Number of locations: 3 (2026)
- Area served: South Africa
- Services: Public EV charging infrastructure
- Website: charge.co.za

Charge (stylized in all caps) is a South African electric vehicle charging network operator, based in Cape Town. The company was founded in 2021, and as of 2026, operates 3 off-grid DC fast charging charging stations, with a planned network size of 120. The company is rolling out charging stations capable of charging both passenger vehicles and electric trucks, along multiple national highways.

== History ==
Founded in 2021 as Zero Carbon Charge, the company began offering public EV charging in November 2024. The company has since changed its name to Charge.

In September 2025, the Development Bank of South Africa (DBSA) announced a R100 million investment into Charge. At the time of the announcement, DBSA divisional executive Spiwe Sibanda stated that Charge's off-grid charging model supported the expansion of the South African EV market, and strengthened consumer trust in green energy. At the time, Charge was the only company in South Africa that was developing a national network of EV DC fast charging stations that used solar power.

In January 2026, Charge opened South Africa's first off-grid solar charging station for electric trucks. The station is situated on the N12 at Wolmaransstad, in the North West province. At the launch, trucks from Chinese commercial vehicle manufacturer SANY were charged entirely from Charge's solar-battery infrastructure. The Development Bank of South Africa said that the test reaffirmed the group's confidence in Charge's business model.

In February 2026, Charge wrote to South African President Cyril Ramaphosa and Trade Minister Parks Tau, to convey its opinion that the government was unintentionally delaying the expansion of the EV market. Charge claimed that after three years of direct engagement, the government had failed to make any meaningful progress in terms of supporting renewable-powered infrastructure. The company said the South African Government's claim to support a future focused on EVs was at odds with a lack of policy and concrete steps to achieve this using the required infrastructure. Charge asked for the government's leadership, coordination, and support in achieving this. Three months later, President Ramaphosa reaffirmed the government's commitment to EVs, and said that the Department of Trade, Industry and Competition (DTIC) was finalizing a complete EV policy.

In March 2026, Charge submitted a formal objection to national roads management agency SANRAL's proposed amendments to the policy that governs the rollout of EV charging infrastructure. In the objection, Charge stated that SANRAL's Rest and Service Facilities (RSF) Policy would undermine private sector investment and delay infrastructure rollout. The policy, if passed in its form at the time, would enable SANRAL to derive a levy of 5 to 7% on all services, and 2 to 3% on all energy sold by companies operating within 60 meters of a road reserve or 100 meters of an interchange.

In May 2026, Charge and Swedish automaker Volvo set a new electric car charging record in South Africa. At the launch of the Charge N3 Tugela station in KZN, a Volvo ES90 reached a maximum charging speed of 321.28 kW, boosting its battery from 9% to 80% in 21 minutes. In total, 67.95kWh was added to the battery, which equaled approximately 320 km of range.

In the same month, Charge's co-founder, Joubert Roux, confirmed in an interview that the company had a R1.8 billion plan to roll out a charging station every 150 km along South Africa’s national highways. Roux also confirmed that the company had calculated that just seven cars using each charging station per day would allow Charge to hit EBIDTA break-even on its costs.

Roux stated that landowners hosting Charge stations received 5% of charging revenue. He discussed Charge's plans for 35MW truck charging facilities, and said that a reliable charging network and sub-R500,000 EVs were needed to really allow SA's EV market to take off.

In June 2026, the company launched two solar-powered charging stations along the N3, which runs between Johannesburg and Durban route, and is one of SA's busiest passenger and freight routes.

In August 2026, Charge announced it planned to double each N3 charging station's capacity, from 360kW to 720 kW. This would allow the system to direct up to 600 kW to a single connector, enabling vehicles and commercial trucks to charge simultaneously at higher power. The upgrades will allow up to six vehicles to simultaneously charge at 120 kW each, adding around 150 km of range in 15 minutes, if they're capable. Charge said the upgrades would also future-proof its network prior to the introduction of next-generation 800-volt vehicles, and lay the foundation for an eventual shift to megawatt-level charging. Charge also confirmed it planned to expand its network to the N1, building those stations with megawatt-level charging capacity from the start.

== See also ==
- Automotive industry in South Africa
- Electricity sector in South Africa
