= Retail Motor Industry Organisation =

South African automotive industry trade association

- Formation: 2000; 26 years ago
- Type: Trade association
- Registration no.: LR26345
- Purpose: Retail automotive industry
- Headquarters: Midrand, Gauteng, South Africa
- Region served: South Africa
- Services: Industry representation Collective bargaining Service standards Industry information Business accreditation
- Members: 8,200 (2026)
- Official language: English
- Key people: Jeánne Esterhuizen (Chairperson); Ipeleng Mabusela and Jan Schoeman (Co-CEOs)
- Main organ: Board of Directors
- Publication: RMI Annual Report
- Affiliations: The National Economic Development and Labor Council (NEDLAC); Business Unity South Africa (BUSA)
- Funding: Membership subscriptions
- Website: rmi.org.za

The Retail Motor Industry Organisation (RMI) is a trade association within the South African automotive industry. Founded in 2000 and headquartered in Midrand, Gauteng, the organization represents companies in the local automotive retail sector.

The association is an parent organization for seven automotive industry associations, including the National Automobile Dealer's Association (NADA), the Vehicle Testing Association (VTA), the South African Petroleum Retailers' Association (SAPRA), and the Tire Equipment Parts Association (TEPA).

As of 2026, RMI represents a total of 8,200 companies (members) in South Africa. Its members include automotive retail franchises for new and pre-owned vehicles, auto servicing and repair shops, fuel retailers, and aftermarket automotive companies. South Africa's vehicle manufacturing, importing, and exporting sectors are represented by a different association – Naamsa.

== History ==
The organization was founded in 2000, through the merger of two preexisting organizations - the South African Motor Industry Employers' Association (SAMIEA) and the Motor Industries Federation (MIF).

Given the merger, RMI traces its lineage much further back, in relation to the establishment of its two founding member organizations. SAMIEA, which used to be the auto industry's employers' organization, was founded in 1935. Even further back, in 1908, was the establishment of the South African Society of Motor Traders (SASMT), which became the Motor Industries Federation.

In January 2026, RMI encouraged South African matriculants (12th grate graduates) to consider working in the auto industry. RMI said the industry is robust, offers a variety of specialist roles, and that a trade qualification gives young people a clear pathway into meaningful work. Furthermore, RMI stated that the South African auto industry comprises 300,000 jobs and includes more than 22,000 businesses, contributing approximately 2.1% of South Africa's GDP.

In March 2026, RMI and the German Chamber of Crafts (HWK) Erfurt launched a three-year structured technical and vocational education and training (TVET) partnership, focused on skills development for electric transport. The program, set to run until the end of 2028, focuses on curriculum enhancement, lecturer development, and strengthening collaboration between colleges and industry workplaces.

== Functions ==
Retail Motor Industry Organisation promotes the interests of South Africa's retail motor industry by representing its members before government, regulators, and industry bodies. RMI advocates on legislative matters, maintains standards of business ethics and service quality in the automotive retail sector, accredits member businesses, combats counterfeit automotive parts and illegal imports, disseminates industry information, and promotes skills development and consumer confidence across the sector.

RMI is also the major employer representative of the Motor Industry Bargaining Council, playing a significant role in labor negotiations and other similar forms of representation.

=== Associations ===
As of mid-2026, RMI represents seven associations in the auto industry. These are:

Constituent associations of the Retail Motor Industry Organisation (RMI)
Association	Full name	Represents
NADA	National Automobile Dealer's Association	Franchised passenger and commercial vehicle dealerships, as well as qualifying pre-owned vehicle dealerships. This includes around 1,500 dealerships in total, as of 2023.
MIWA	Motor Industry Workshop Association	Independent automotive repair workshops, service centers and general vehicle maintenance businesses.
SAMBRA	South African Motor Body Repairers' Association	Motor body repairers and spray painters.
TEPA	Tire Equipment Parts Association	Tire dealers, fitment centers, automotive parts distributors, and related aftermarket suppliers.
SAPRA	South African Petroleum Retailers' Association	Gas stations and petroleum retailers.
ARA	Automotive Remanufacturers' Association	Businesses engaged in the remanufacturing of automotive components such as engines, transmissions, alternators, and steering systems.
SAVABA	South African Vehicle and Bodybuilders' Association	Manufacturers and converters of commercial vehicle bodies, trailers, buses, and specialized vehicles.
VTA	Vehicle Testing Association	Operators of roadworthy and vehicle testing stations.

== Structure ==
RMI is governed by a Board of Directors, headed by its president, whose members are elected through its regional and constituent association structures. Its day-to-day operations are led by Co-CEOs.

== See also ==
- Automotive industry in South Africa
- Plug-in electric vehicles in South Africa
- Naamsa
