= Naamsa =

South African automotive industry trade association

- Formation: 1935; 91 years ago
- Type: Trade association
- Tax ID no.: 4070109972 (VAT ID)
- Registration no.: 2021/358607/08 (Nonprofit); 930/023/609 (Public benefit organization)
- Legal status: Nonprofit
- Purpose: Automotive industry advocacy (mainly manufacturers, importers, and exporters)
- Headquarters: Pretoria, Gauteng, South Africa
- Region served: South Africa
- Products: Automotive industry data
- Services: Industry advocacy Policy development Economic research
- Members: 42 (2026)
- Official language: English
- Key people: Peter van Binsbergen (President); Mikel Mabasa (CEO)
- Main organ: Board of Directors
- Publication: Automotive Trade Manual
- Affiliations: The International Organization of Motor Vehicle Manufacturers (OICA)
- Funding: Membership dues Sponsorships; Events; Publications; Industry services
- Website: naamsa.net
- Formerly called: National Association of Automobile Manufacturers of South Africa

Naamsa, stylised in lowercase, is a nonprofit trade association (representative body) and public benefit organisation within the South African automotive industry. Founded in 1935 and headquartered in Pretoria, the organisation represents numerous businesses in the new vehicle sector, including the country's automotive manufacturers and importers.

The association is a trusted source for data relating to the SA auto industry, such as new vehicle sales figures; national vehicle production, import, and export figures; automotive industry performance, investment, employment, and capacity utilisation data; and industry forecasts.

As of 2026, Naamsa represents a total of 42 companies manufacturing, assembling, distributing, and/or importing new vehicles in South Africa. The country's automotive retail market is represented by a different association - the Retail Motor Industry Organisation.

== History ==
The organisation was founded in 1935 in Port Elizabeth, as the National Association of Automobile Manufacturers of South Africa (NAAMSA). It was established with the goal of representing SA automotive manufacturers and importers.

In March 2021, Naamsa announced it was changing its name to better represent the increased breadth of industry players it represented. Thus, the organisation switched from the National Association of Automobile Manufacturers of South Africa to simply Naamsa, or, more formally, Naamsa - The Automotive Business Council.

== Published data ==
Naamsa is a major source of automotive industry data and research, including for:

- New vehicle sales, with comparisons and market commentary (monthly)
- National vehicle production, import, and export figures (monthly)
- Automotive industry performance, investment, employment, and capacity utilisation data
- Industry forecasts for sales, production, and exports
- Research on topics such as EVs/NEVs, AGOA, BRICS+, trade policy, decarbonisation, and industrial policy
- A CEO Confidence Index for the auto industry
- A Quarterly Review of business conditions
- An Automotive Trade Manual, comprising an industry overview, key statistics, and information pertaining to government policy, trade, investment, manufacturers, and suppliers

== Structure ==
Naamsa is led by a CEO, a role currently held by Mikel Mabasa, as well as a Board of Directors. Current board members are as follows:

Title	Name	Industry position
President	Peter van Binsbergen	CEO, BMW South Africa
Vice-president (Manufacturing)	Andrew Kirby	President and CEO, Toyota South Africa Motors
Vice-president (Retailing)	Thato Magasa	CEO, Tata Motors Passenger Vehicles
Vice-president (Heavy Commercial)	Jan Aichinger	CEO, MAN Automotive South Africa
Immediate Past President	Billy Tom	CEO, Isuzu Motors South Africa

== SA Auto Week ==
Naamsa hosts an annual industry conference, SA Auto Week, a business-to-business automotive conference and exhibition. It is not a public motor show, and is aimed at vehicle manufacturers (OEMs), component manufacturers and suppliers, importers and distributors, government ministers and policymakers, regulators, the media, industry associations, academics, financial institutions, and the like.

At the conclusion of each SA Auto Week, Naamsa presents the Accelerator Awards, recognising excellence across the South African automotive industry. The awards began in 2002, and are sponsored by WesBank. Many of the awards are data-driven, rather than based on a judging panel.

== See also ==
- Automotive industry in South Africa
- Plug-in electric vehicles in South Africa
- Retail Motor Industry Organisation
