= Chery South Africa =

South African automotive manufacturer

- Type: Subsidiary
- Industry: Automotive
- Founded: 2021; 5 years ago
- Headquarters: Johannesburg, Gauteng, South Africa
- Number of locations: 150 dealerships (2026)
- Area served: South Africa
- Products: Passenger vehicles
- Production output: 15,000 vehicle target (2027)
- Brands: Chery; Omoda; Jaecoo; Jetour iCaur; Lepas
- Services: Vehicle servicing
- Number of employees: ~700 in manufacturing (2026)
- Parent: Chery
- Website: chery.co.za

Chery South Africa is a South African automotive manufacturer based in Johannesburg, Gauteng. Founded in 2021, it is a wholly owned subsidiary of Chinese automotive group Chery.

As of 2026, the company operates 150 dealerships across South Africa, and owns a manufacturing plant in Rosslyn, Gauteng, where it produces six distinct models for the domestic and export markets.

== History ==
=== Original imports ===
Chery first entered the South African market in 2007 through McCarthy Motor Holdings (now Bidvest McCarthy), with the Chinese manufacturer's vehicles being imported and distributed locally. The initial operation formed part of McCarthy's broader motor retail business, which included vehicle dealerships, parts and servicing, finance, and insurance. Chery's entry was part of a wider expansion of Chinese vehicle brands into South Africa during the period.

Chery's early South African range included the QQ and QQ3 hatchbacks, the J2 and J3 hatchbacks, the Tiggo compact SUV, and the P10 minibus. The QQ3 became particularly notable for its low price, with the entry-level model positioned as one of the country's most affordable new cars. By 2009, McCarthy had entered into a joint venture with Imperial Holdings, covering the import and distribution of Chery and Foton vehicles. The venture combined McCarthy's existing Chery distribution rights with Imperial's distribution infrastructure and dealership network.

Chery remained in the South African market through the mid-2010s, with the Tiggo becoming one of its more successful products. However, the company's low-cost positioning faced increasing competition from established manufacturers and other Chinese brands. In November 2017, the South African-market QQ3 received significant negative attention after receiving zero stars in a Global NCAP crash test of budget vehicles sold in South Africa.

In 2018, Motus, then the Imperial group's automotive division and Chery's importer and distributor in South Africa, stopped importing Chery vehicles. At the time, Motus said that there were approximately 7,000 Chery vehicles in operation in South Africa. Motus also said that that while the brand had been relatively popular, particularly through its Tiggo SUV, increasing competition from established manufacturers had reduced its viability in the local market. Motus continued to provide servicing, warranty support, and spare parts for existing Chery vehicles after imports ended.

=== Return to South Africa ===
In August 2021, Chery announced its return to South Africa through Chery South Africa, a wholly owned subsidiary of Chery Automobile. The company established its headquarters in Johannesburg, and planned to launch with 30 dealerships during the fourth quarter of 2021. Chery also said it intended to use South Africa as a base from which to expand elsewhere in Africa.

Chery SA launched the Tiggo 4 Pro in November 2021 as its first model in the country following the company's return. The launch marked Chery's re-entry into the South African market, and was also the first launch of a right-hand-drive Chery product globally.

In February 2022, Chery expanded its South African range with the Tiggo 8 Pro, followed by the Tiggo 7 Pro in May. By July, Chery had begun reporting its sales to naamsa, recording 1,262 vehicle sales that month, and ranking among the country's leading passenger vehicle brands.

In November 2022, Chery SA reported having sold over 10,000 vehicles during its first 11 months of operation. The company had expanded its network to over 70 dealerships, and was ranking among the 10 best-selling passenger vehicle brands in South Africa.

=== Expansion into new marques ===
In April 2023, Chery SA introduced the Omoda brand to the South African market, beginning with the Omoda C5 crossover. Omoda was positioned as a separate, more premium brand within Chery's South African operations.

Chery continued to expand its South African operations during 2023. The automaker sold 16,110 vehicles during the year – approximately twice its 2022 sales, and ranked as South Africa's second-largest SUV brand by sales.

In April 2024, the Jaecoo brand launched in SA with the J7 SUV. South Africa was the first right-hand-drive market and the first African market to launch the model.

That same year, Chery SA sold a total of 19,971 vehicles, up from 16,106 in 2023, representing a 24% increase year-over-year. Chery positioned itself as SA's eighth best-selling passenger vehicle brand. As its newer marques had not yet reported sales to naamsa, Chery's 2024 sales total excluded Omoda, Jaecoo, and Jetour sales.

In June 2025, Chery introduced its first new energy vehicles (NEVs) in South Africa, via Omoda and Jaecoo, with plug-in hybrid (PHEV) versions of the Omoda C9 and Jaecoo J7.

=== Move into local manufacturing ===
In July 2025, Chery South Africa announced that it was conducting a feasibility study into establishing local vehicle production. The company said it was evaluating several options, including semi-knocked-down (SKD) and complete knock-down (CKD) assembly, contract manufacturing, a joint venture, and a greenfield investment. At the time, Chery said its rapid growth in South Africa had reached a sales volume that justified investigating local manufacturing.

In October 2025, Chery said its initial production proposal would focus on the Tiggo 4 compact crossover, before potentially expanding production to other models, and serving the wider African market.

In January 2026, Nissan South Africa announced an agreement to sell its manufacturing assets in Rosslyn, Gauteng, to Chery SA. The proposed transaction included the vehicle assembly plant and a nearby stamping plant, with the majority of Nissan's employees at the facility to be offered employment by Chery.

In March 2026, Chery announced that production at the Rosslyn facility was expected to begin by mid-2027. The plant was to be retrofitted and recommissioned for the production of internal combustion and electrified vehicles, with Chery intending to use the facility as a manufacturing and export hub for Africa and Europe.

The South African Competition Tribunal approved the acquisition in June 2026, subject to public interest conditions relating to employment and local procurement.

On 3 July 2026, Chery officially opened its new Rosslyn manufacturing plant. Production was scheduled to begin in mid-2027, with an initial ramp-up target of 15,000 vehicles in 2027, and a planned annual capacity of 50,000 vehicles once the facility was fully operational. Chery also announced plans to retain the plant's 692 existing employees, and confirmed its plans to develop the facility into a regional manufacturing and export hub.

In July 2026, Chery confirmed the initial production lineup for the Rosslyn plant, comprising models from the Chery, Jaecoo, and Jetour brands. The Tiggo 4 Cross, Jaecoo J5, Jetour T1, and Jetour T2 were confirmed for local production, starting in 2027.

In October 2026, Chery revealed that the first vehicle to be manufactured in SA would be the Omoda C4. Is said the compact crossover would be offered in petrol, hybrid, and fully electric variants, and was set to launch in the local market in 2027.

== Operations ==
As of 2026, Chery SA operates 150 dealerships across the country, and owns a manufacturing plant in Rosslyn, Gauteng.

== Models ==
=== Current vehicle lineup ===
Marque	Model	Category	Variants	Markets	SA manufacturing established	Ref
Chery	Grootman	Pickup truck	TBD	Domestic; exports TBD	2027; 1 year's time	
Chery	Tiggo 4 Cross	Compact crossover	ICE; hybrid	Domestic; exports to African and European markets	2027; 1 year's time	
Jaecoo	J5	Subcompact crossover	ICE; NEV	Domestic; exports to African and European markets	2027; 1 year's time	
Jetour	T1	Compact crossover SUV	TBD	Domestic; exports to African and European markets	2027; 1 year's time	
Jetour	T2	Midsize SUV	1.5-liter turbo gasoline; 2-liter turbo gasoline; 1.5-liter PHEV	Domestic; exports to African and European markets	2027; 1 year's time	
Omoda	C4	Midsize SUV	ICE; hybrid; BEV	Domestic; exports TBD	2027; 1 year's time	

* The vehicles in the table above have been confirmed for production once South African manufacturing begins. This is expected to take place in the second half of 2027.

== See also ==
- Automotive industry in South Africa
- Manufacturing in South Africa
