= Rosslyn, South Africa =

Rosslyn
- Suburb
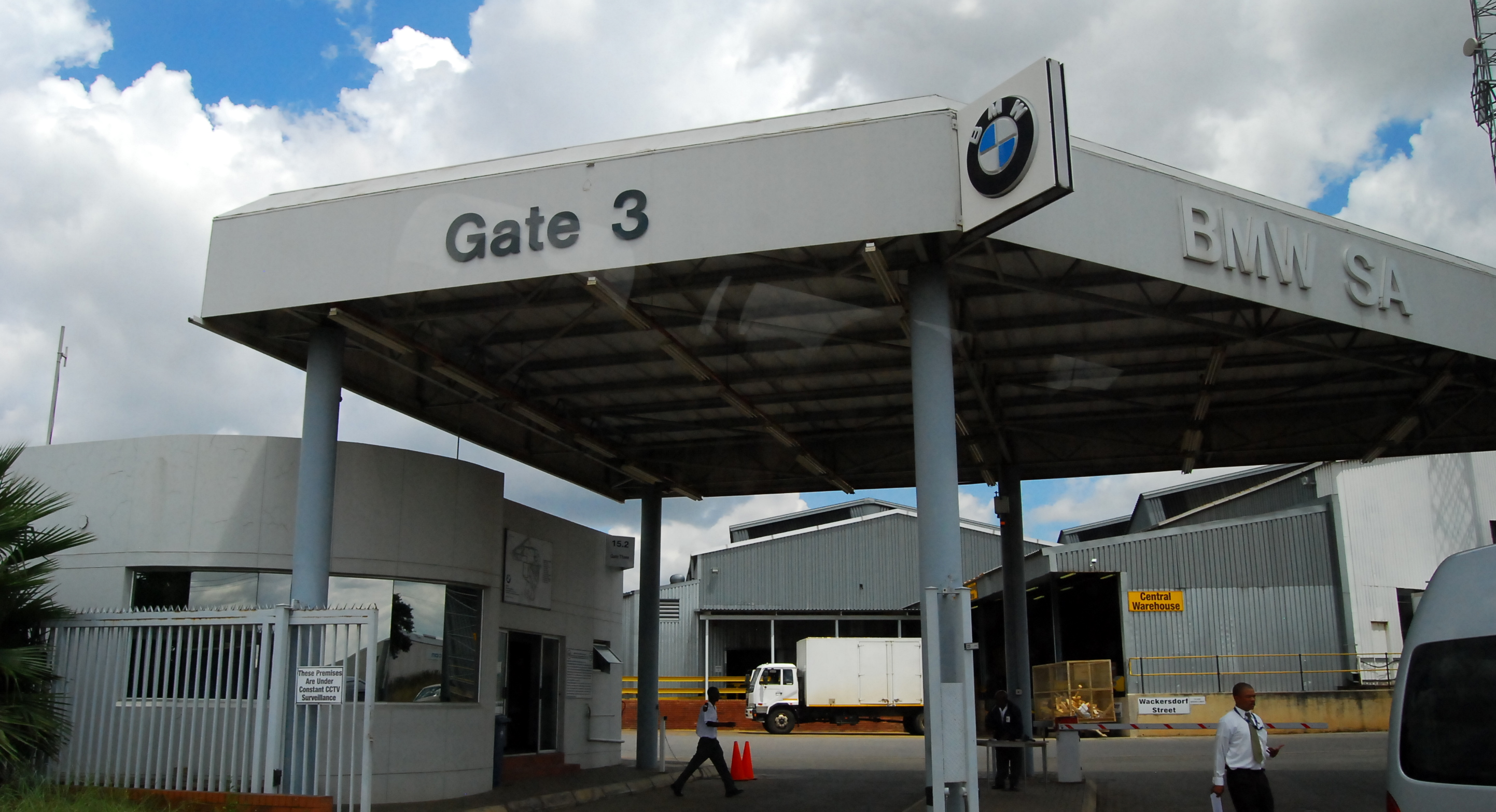
- Entrance to BMW South Africa's Rosslyn manufacturing plant

- Location within Gauteng Location within South Africa
- Coordinates: 25.625°S 28.089°E
- Country: South Africa
- Province: Gauteng
- Municipality: City of Tshwane
- Main Place: Akasia

Area
  - Total: 0.89 km^{2} (0.34 sq mi)

Population (2011)
  - Total: 2,960
  - Density: 3,300/km^{2} (8,600/sq mi)

Racial makeup (2011)
  - Black African: 98.8%
  - Coloured: 0.2%
  - White: 0.7%
  - Other: 0.2%

First languages (2011)
  - Northern Sotho: 26.4%
  - Tswana: 24.1%
  - English: 11.1%
  - Zulu: 9.9%
  - Other: 28.6%
- Time zone: UTC+2 (SAST)
- Postal code (street): 0182
- PO box: 0200
- Area code: 012

Rosslyn is an industrial suburb of Akasia, 29 km north-west of Pretoria, and part of the City of Tshwane Metropolitan Municipality in the Gauteng province of South Africa.

This industrialized area is best known for its automotive manufacturing industry.

== Economy ==
Rosslyn is home to a major BMW South Africa factory, which opened in 1968. It was BMW's first factory outside of Europe.

Nissan South Africa maintained a factory in Rosslyn since 1966, manufacturing a vast range of motor vehicles, trucks, light delivery vans (locally known as "bakkies") and 4X4 offroaders.

IVECO also operates a plant in the area.

In 2012, vehicle manufacturing plants in South Africa contributed about 6.2% to the country's gross domestic product.

In July 2026, Nissan SA's Rosslyn plant was officially handed over to Chery South Africa, after the two reached a deal for its sale earlier that year, and regulatory approval was granted.

== See also ==
- Automotive industry in South Africa
- Manufacturing in South Africa
