= BP Southern Africa =

Southern African oil and gas subsidiary

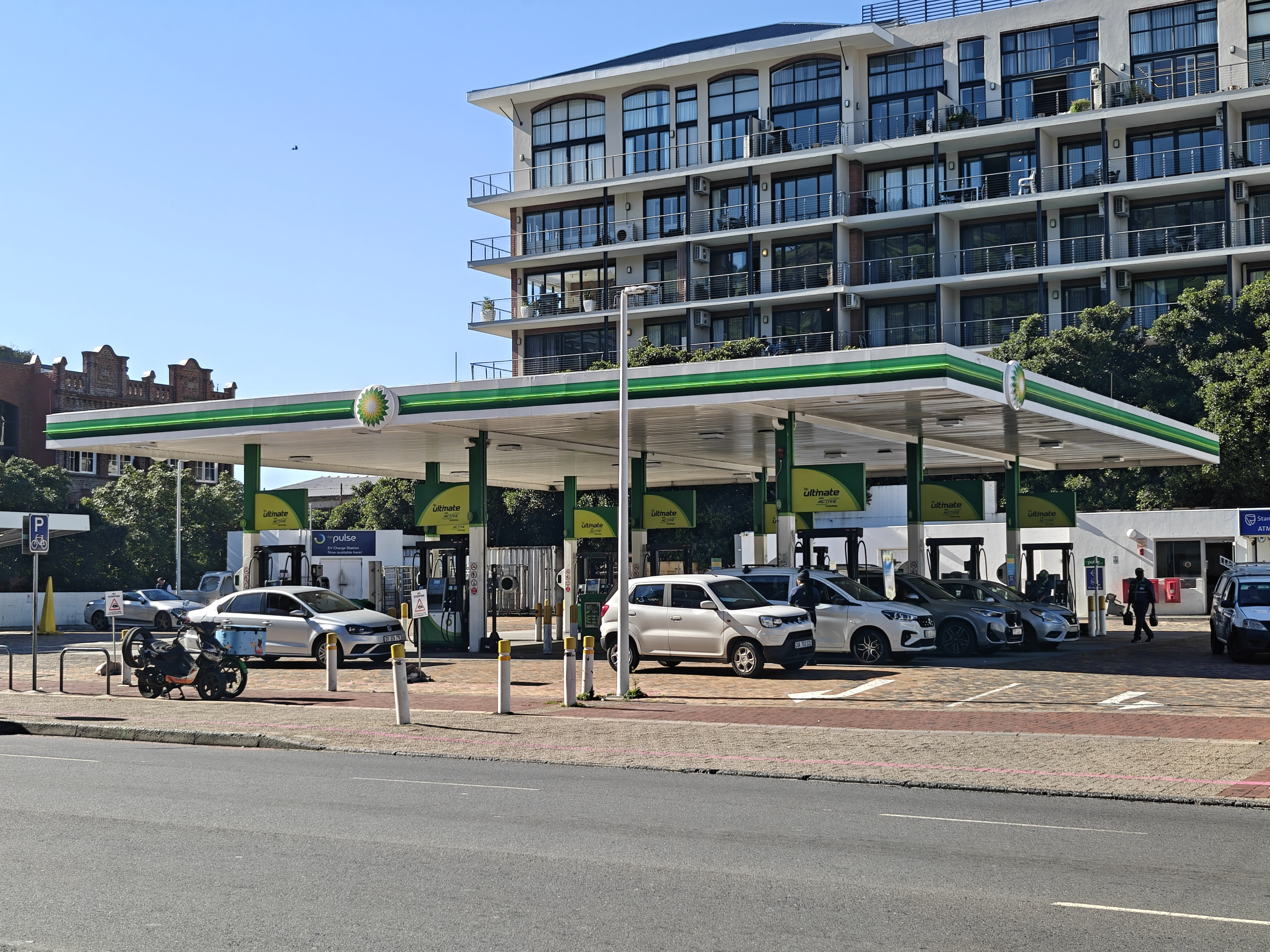
- A BP gas station in De Waterkant, Cape Town
- Type: Subsidiary
- Industry: Petroleum
- Founded: 1924; 102 years ago
- Headquarters: Johannesburg, Gauteng, South Africa
- Number of locations: ~ 500 (2025)
- Area served: South Africa
- Key people: Taelo Mojapelo (CEO)
- Products: Gasoline; Lubricants
- Brands: Wild Bean Café bp Ultimate bp Express
- Owner: BP plc (75%); Kapela (20%); BPSA Education Foundation Trust (5%)
- Website: bp.com/en_za

BP Southern Africa (BPSA) is a South African petroleum company, headquartered in Johannesburg. A majority-owned subsidiary of BP plc, BPSA operates around 500 gas stations across SA, and manufactures petroleum products, including lubricants. As of 2025, in terms of network size, BP was the sixth-largest out of the eight major gas retailers in SA.

== History ==
BP Southern Africa has evolved from the Atlantic Refining Company of Africa, which was founded in 1924.

The company celebrated its 100th anniversary in 2024. In a press release, the company confirmed plans to expand its network of gas stations, as well as upgrade and expand its forecourt retail offerings. Furthermore, the company stated its plan to transition away from being focused on the petroleum industry, and towards being an integrated energy company.

In April 2024, BPSA said its goal was to add 15 new forecourts to its South African network in 2024, and an additional 11 in 2025. It said it was adding solar power installations to four its gas stations, to pilot a transition away from diesel generators for backup power.

In May 2024, BPSA announced it had agreed to sell its 50% shareholding in then-defunct oil refinery SAPREF. The refinery was once South Africa's largest by production volume. Shell South Africa also sold its 50% share. The site was sold for R1 to the SA government-owned Central Energy Fund (CEF), which intends to repair and reactivate it.

In June 2025, a Lightstone survey conducted in Gauteng found that BP was the third-most popular gas station brand in the province.

In July 2025, BPSA announced it had begun the process of modernizing its gas stations across South Africa. The company said it had also invested in its logistics network, partnering with two companies to improve the efficiency of its petroleum deliveries. Furthermore, BPSA confirmed it would invest R58 million in a partnership with the Small Enterprise Finance Agency (SEFA), to support black-owned SMEs with funding and technical skills required to operate gas stations.

In 2026, BPSA confirmed that had decided not to continue its EV charger rollout in South Africa. The pilot the company announced in 2023 had two chargers installed (one in Joburg and one in Cape Town), but they were never turned on.

When a local media outlet reached out to BPSA for comment, the company said that despite globally expanding its network of chargers, South Africa was not an immediate priority for EV charging. This, despite the EV and PHEV market in SA growing in recent years. The company further stated that it had decided to focus on a reset strategy that selectively reallocated investments to biogas, biofuels, and EV charging.

== Operations ==
As of 2025, the company operates around 500 gas stations throughout South Africa.

The company has a partnership with major South African supermarket chain Pick n Pay, whereby PnP Express convenience stores are co-located at numerous BP forecourts in SA. At other forecourts, BP has its own bp Express convenience stores. In its 2025 financial statements, Pick n Pay reported operating a total of 188 Express locations at BP gas stations. PnP SmartShopper loyalty points can also be earned by purchasing BP fuel.

BP operates its Wild Bean Café takeaway coffee locations at many of its forecourts.

The company makes use of six fuel storage terminals. Two of these are owned entirely by BP, two are co-owned with Sasol (50-50), one is co-owned with Shell (50-50), and one is co-owned with Astron and Engen (one third each).

BP Southern Africa is a member of the Fuels Industry Association of South Africa, along with its major competitors. The association represents the fuels industry, engaging with stakeholders, and communicating the industry's stances to the public and media. BP Southern Africa was one of the FIASA's founding members, when the association was established in 1994.

== Controversy ==
In 2025, a final ruling was issued against BPSA, as part of a case brought forth by Gideon Erasmus, who leads Uzani Environmental Advocacy. BPSA was found guilty in 2019 of constructing and upgrading 17 gas stations without obtaining the required environmental authorization. BP was fined R53 million in 2024 for doing so, and in 2025, was ordered to pay legal costs to Uzani for its private prosecution efforts.

== See also ==
- Fuels Industry Association of South Africa
- BP plc
