= BMW South Africa =

Automobile manufacturer based in Rosslyn, South Africa

- Type: Subsidiary
- Industry: Automotive
- Founded: 1975; 51 years ago
- Headquarters: Midrand, Gauteng, South Africa
- Key people: Pieter Van Biesbergen (President and CEO)
- Products: Passenger vehicles
- Parent: BMW
- Website: bmw.co.za

BMW South Africa Pty Ltd is an automobile manufacturer based in Midrand, South Africa, with a factory in Rosslyn, Gauteng, and an IT hub in Pretoria. The company is part of German automotive manufacturing group BMW.

Founded in 1975, the company currently manufactures the X3 compact SUV for domestic and export markets. The South African entity is the only BMW manufacturer that produces the X3 plug-in hybrid (PHEV) for export.

== History ==
As early as 1929, the first BMW motorcycle was imported to South Africa by a private individual. The first cars of the brand in 1952 was a BMW 501.

However, the assembly of BMW automobiles did not begin until 1968 by Praetor Monteerders in Rosslyn. The company also assembled Jeep models. In 1970, BMW bought shares in Praetor Monteerders to completely take it over in 1975, thus establishing BMW South Africa, and was also the first BMW plant outside of Germany, at a cost of over R10 billion.

After an investment of R3.5 billion at the beginning of the new millennium, the Rosslyn plant was regarded as the most modern automobile plant in the Southern Hemisphere.

By the 1980s, the Rosslyn plant was producing vehicles for both local and export markets, and had established itself as one of the most productive manufacturing sites in BMW's network, producing thousands of vehicles annually.

In the late 1990s and early 2000s, BMW South Africa began producing the 3 Series model, which became one of the most popular and highly exported models produced at the group's Rosslyn plant. The local production of the 3 Series further solidified South Africa’s importance within BMW’s global operations, and the plant’s capacity continued to grow to meet international demand.

In 2006, the BMW Group in South Africa had the largest market share outside Germany, with 7.8% (2006). This figure subsequently dropped to about 3% in 2023.

Around three quarters of BMW South Africa's production was exported in 2011. The production was limited to the 3 series.

In 2015, BMW South Africa moved into new headquarters in Midrand. The building also contains the company's Financial Services division, as well as an on-site training center.

BMW made an investment of R6 billion in 2018, to upgrade the Rosslyn plant for the production of the then-new X3 model. This allowed the Rosslyn plant to cater to growing global demand for SUVs.

== Models ==
=== Previous ===
The first models produced were the BMW 1800 SA (from 1968) or 2000 SA (from 1969) derived from the Glas 1700. First, the assembly took place from complete knock down (CKD) kits, which were sent to the production facilities to South Africa. In 1973, the optically revised models 1804 and 2004 followed, which were only built for one year.

From 1974, the BMW 5 Series was produced in South Africa from CKD kits. The original 5 series was produced until 1985, after which the interior and the engines of the new series E28 were received from 1982. The new series E28 was also replaced later than in Germany (1989) by the series E34, which was the last 5 Series produced in South Africa.

The BMW 530MLE in 1976 was the second car that BMW’s fledgling M division produced, and it was designed to compete in South Africa's Modified Production Series instead of the regular E12 528i. 100 homologated road cars had to be produced by BMW South Africa under the regulations, with 105 to 110 of these eventually being sold to the public.

Production of the uniquely South African E23 BMW 745i began in 1983. The vehicle was powered by the 3.5-liter M88 engine of the BMW M1 and at the time was the fastest BMW 7 in the world. By 1986, 192 vehicles of this type were manufactured.

The E30 BMW 333i with the 6 cylinder 3.2 litre M30B32 engine was produced from 1986 (according to another source 1985 to 1987) and was uniquely offered in South Africa in lieu of the left-hand drive only 4 cylinder M3 of other markets. Development was done in collaboration with Alpina and the vehicle shared many components with the Alpina B6. 204 to 215 vehicles were built. Another designation called the 325is was also only made for the South African market.

South African BMW 3 Series models have also been exported to Australia since 1994 and to other countries since 1999. After the take over of the Rover Group, the marketing and producing of Land Rover vehicles began.

In 2018, South African production of the 3 series ended after 1,191,604 units and five model generations.

=== Current ===
In 2018, the X3 (G01) series began being manufactured in Rosslyn, Gauteng, for local and export markets.

The fourth generation G45 X3 started production at the plant in 2024. South Africa manufactures ICE and hybrid variants of the X3, and is the only country producing the X3 plug-in hybrid (PHEV) for export.

== Car of the Year ==
BMW models have already been named Car of the Year by the South African Motor Journalists Association (SAGMJ) seven times.

- 1988: BMW 735i
- 1990: BMW 525i
- 1993: BMW 316i
- 1997: BMW 528i
- 2001: BMW 320d
- 2006: BMW 3 Series
- 2011: BMW 530d

== Sustainability ==
The BMW Rosslyn plant has adopted numerous environmentally-friendly practices, including the use of renewable energy and water conservation initiatives, aligning with BMW's global commitment to reducing its carbon footprint.

In 2015, the Green Building Council of South Africa awarded BMW's new Midrand-based headquarters a 5-star rating for its environmentally-friendly features. The rating took into consideration the indoor environment quality, energy, transport, water, materials, land use, ecology, emissions, and innovations of the building. BMW South Africa was the first automotive company in South Africa to receive the rating.

== See also ==
- Automotive industry in South Africa
- Manufacturing in South Africa
