= King Price Insurance =

Privately held insurance company based in South Africa

- Company type: Privately owned
- Industry: Insurance
- Founded: 2012; 13 years ago
- Founder: Gideon Galloway
- Headquarters: Waterkloof Glen, Pretoria, South Africa
- Area served: South Africa
- Key people: Gideon Galloway, CEO; Justinus van der Westhuizen, CEO
- Products: Auto insurance: Home insurance; Car insurance; Buildings insurance; Business insurance; Life insurance
- Website: www.kingprice.co.za insurance.kingprice.co.za

King Price Insurance is a South African-based, privately held insurance company that offers short term insurance. The company is best known for its monthly decreasing car insurance premium model.

== History ==
King Price Insurance was founded by Gideon Galloway. The company received its initial funding from Francois van Niekerk of Mertech group and Stefan van der Walt of Nikon, and was launched in 2012. The company offered monthly insurance, reducing premiums that decrease with the depreciating value of the asset. King Price Insurance registered with as a member of the South African Insurance Crime Bureau (SAICB). King Price insurance is reinsured by reinsurer Munich RE. The company’s head offices is located at the Waterkloof Glen, Pretoria.

== Product ==
King Price Insurance offers a wide range of short-term insurance products, including car, home contents, buildings, specialised items, trailers, caravans, portable possessions, and all-risk insurance. The company is renowned for its unique car insurance model, where premiums decrease monthly in line with the continuously depreciating value of the insured vehicle. Additionally, King Price provides R1 insurance add-ons, allowing clients with comprehensive car insurance to cover items like bicycles, golf clubs, hearing aids, and motorbike gear for R1 per month.

== Advertising campaigns ==
King Price has many well-known ad campaigns and are known for using their South African humor in these viral ads. In 2018, King Price’s ‘Do Something Sexy to a Tractor’ advertisement went viral with viewers on YouTube saying it is the 'best ad ever!' The other King Price ad that went viral after it was released is the “Lobola is no laughing matter… But not making sense can be” advert which shows a young man with an odd accent messing up his lobola payment.

== Recognition ==
King Price was voted the Best Car and Home Insurance Provider in the 2024 Best of Pretoria Readers’ Choice Awards. "Out with the old, in with the new king for Best of Pretoria". Mybroadband. 24 October 2018.
