= List of automobile manufacturers of Africa =

This is a list of notable automotive manufacturers based in Africa. It is a subset of the list of automobile manufacturers, and includes both active and defunct companies.

== Algeria ==
- SNVI

== Egypt ==
- Bavarian Auto Group
- General Motors Egypt
- Ghabbour Group
- Speranza Motors

== Ghana ==
- Kantanka cars

== Kenya ==
- Mobius Motors

== Morocco ==
- Laraki
- Société Automobiles Ménara
- Somaca

== Nigeria ==
- Innoson Vehicle Manufacturing

== South Africa ==
- Birkin Cars
- BMW South Africa
- Chery South Africa
- Denel Vehicle Systems
- Ford Motor Company of Southern Africa
- Isuzu South Africa
- Mercedes-Benz South Africa
- Paramount Group
- Toyota South Africa Motors
- Uri

=== Former ===
- AMCAR
- Delta Motors
- Peugeot and Citroën South Africa (PACSA)
- General Motors South Africa
- Glass Sport Motors (GSM)
- N4 Trucks
- Nissan South Africa
- Puma
- Ranger
- Samcor
- SAMIL Trucks
- SIGMA

== Tunisia ==
- Industries Mécaniques Maghrébines (IMM)
- Wallyscar

== Uganda ==
- Kiira Motors Corporation (KMC)

== See also ==
- List of automobile manufacturers
- List of automobile marques
