= North (disambiguation) =

North is a cardinal direction or compass point.

North or The North may also refer to:

== Arts and entertainment ==
=== Film and television ===
- North (1994 film), an American comedy film
- North (2009 film), a Norwegian film
- "North" (Due South), a 1995 television episode
- "North" (Fear the Walking Dead), a 2016 television episode

=== Literature ===
- North (poetry collection), collection by Seamus Heaney
- North (novel), by Louis-Ferdinand Céline, 1960
- North, a 2004 novel by Donna Jo Napoli

=== Music ===
- North (band), an Australian boy band
- North (Darkstar album), the debut album of Darkstar
- North (EP), by Ego Likeness, 2009
- North (Elvis Costello album), 2003
- North (Logh album), 2007
- North (Mary Dillon album), 2013
- North (Matchbox Twenty album), 2012
- North (Something Corporate album), 2003
- "North", a song by Afro Celt Sound System on the album Volume 3: Further in Time
- "North", a B-side by Björk
- "North", a song by Clairo on the album Immunity
- "North", a song by Coil on Winter Solstice: North, 1999, and re-released on Moon's Milk (In Four Phases)
- "North", a song by Paul Mounsey on the album NahooToo
- The North (album), a 2012 album by Stars
- The North, an album by Men of North Country

== People and fictional characters ==
- North (surname), a list of people and fictional characters
- North (given name)

== Places ==
- North, South Carolina, a town in the United States
- North, Virginia, an unincorporated community
- North (London sub region), a sub-region of the London Plan
- Northern Canada or the North, northernmost region of Canada
- Northern England or the North, the northern part of England considered as a cultural area
- North Wales, a geographical region in Wales
- The North, an alternative name for Northern Ireland
- Northern United States or the North, geographic or historical term for regions of the United States
  - North (American Civil War), national government of President Abraham Lincoln and 24 states supporting it
- North Dome, a granite dome in Yosemite National Park, California
- North Governate, a governate of Lebanon
- North Pass, a mountain pass in Colorado, United States
- North River (disambiguation), various rivers (and communities)

== Other uses ==
- Baron North, a title in the Peerage of England
- North baronets, three titles, one in the Baronetage of England and two in the Baronetage of the United Kingdom
- NORTH (eSports team), a gaming team
- North (payment processing company), a fintech and payment processing company
- North Limited, a former Australian mining company
- The North (professional wrestling), a tag team in Impact Wrestling comprising Josh Alexander and Ethan Page
- North School (disambiguation), several schools
- North Station, a train station in Boston
- North Station (subway), a subway station in Boston

== See also ==
- Air North (disambiguation), several airlines
- Global North, the developed countries of the world
- Far North (disambiguation)
- Nord (disambiguation), French, Italian, Danish and Catalan for north
- Norte (disambiguation), Spanish, Portuguese and Galician for north
  - El Norte (disambiguation)
- Northern Region (disambiguation)
