= Stewart Clegg =

British-born, Australian sociologist (born 1947)

- Born: 1947 (age 78–79); Bradford, England
- Education: University of Aston; Bradford University
- Scientific career
- Fields: Sociology and organisational theory
- Workplaces: University of Technology, Sydney

Stewart Clegg (born 1947, Bradford) is a British-born Australian sociologist and organizational theorist, and a professor at the School of Project Management, University of Sydney. Prior to joining the University of Sydney he was Distinguished Professor of Management and Organization Studies at the University of Technology Sydney.

== Research ==
Clegg is an Australian professor in the organization studies field and is the author and editor of over forty monographs, textbooks, encyclopaedia, and handbooks including the Sage handbook of power (2009) and Sage directions in organisation studies (2009). Stewart's research interests include organisation and management theory and the theory of power, although he has written on other topics including 'food', 'strategy', 'modernity' and 'gossip'. In 2003, a book listed Clegg as one of the top 200 business gurus in the world and this book has been translated into many languages, including Spanish, Korean, Portuguese and French. He sits on Editorial Boards for research journals and is editor of the AiOS (Advances in Organization Studies) for Benjamins, the European and American publishers. Stewart has also acted as consultant to international newspapers, such as the British Sunday Times and the Australian Financial Review, for whom he has devised the methodology for their "Power Lists", as well as to universities, business firms, and health services.

== Theory of power ==
Clegg's "circuits of power" theory likens the production and organising of power to an electric circuit board consisting of three distinct interacting circuits: episodic, dispositional, and facilitative. These circuits operate at three levels, two are macro and one is micro. The episodic circuit is the micro level and is constituted of irregular exercise of power as agents address feelings, communication, conflict, and resistance in day-to-day interrelations. The outcomes of the episodic circuit are both positive and negative. The dispositional circuit is constituted of macro level rules of practice and socially constructed meanings that inform member relations and legitimate authority. The facilitative circuit is constituted of macro level technology, environmental contingencies, job design, and networks, which empower or disempower and thus punish or reward, agency in the episodic circuit. All three independent circuits interact at “obligatory passage points” which are channels for empowerment or disempowerment.

To give a sense of how this model works, Clegg applies it to Crozier's study of a tobacco factory in France where maintenance workers modified the plant equipment. This action empowered them with exclusive knowledge of the machinery unavailable in the manuals. It also represented taking control of an obligatory passage point, which altered all three circuits of power. The act directly altered the facilitative circuit of technology. The knock-on effect at the dispositional circuit was that it changed what it meant to be a maintenance worker. At the episodic circuit it altered the worker's power in day-to-day interaction and control of resources and outcomes. The overall impact of taking control of an obligatory passage point was that it allowed the workers to negotiate increased freedoms and wage increases.

== Academic positions ==
Before moving to UTS, Clegg was reader at Griffith University (1976–84), professor at the University of New England (1985–89), professor at the University of St. Andrews (1990–1993), and foundation professor at the University of Western Sydney, Macarthur, (1993–96). He has also held positions at universities in Scotland; Australia, England, France, New Zealand, Hong Kong, Brazil, Canada, Mexico and the United States. He currently also holds visiting professorships at European universities and research centres. In 2010 he spent time as a visiting distinguished fellow in the Institute of Advanced Study, Durham University, and in 2011 will be the Montezelomo Distinguished Visiting Professor at the University of Cambridge's Judge Institute.

== Honorary Doctor of Philosophy ==
Stewart is one of the 2017 honorary doctor recipients at Umeå University. The honorary doctorate was awarded for his scientific output which has far-reaching multidisciplinary content characterized by the ambition to place organization and management theory in a wider social science context all the while setting out from a critical and reflecting view. His research contribution on power mechanisms in organizations is indisputable. Stewart R. Clegg also held an active role as a member of the scientific reference group in the research project funded by the Swedish Riksbank Strategy, Design and Organizing in City Development Processes (Led by Nils Wåhlin at Umeå School of Business and Economics), that greatly dealt with the European Capital of Culture venture in Umeå. Stewart R. Clegg has visited Umeå School of Business and Economics on a number of occasions, the last visit was in February 2017 as an external reviewer for a public defense of a doctoral dissertation on organizational paradoxes (Paradox as the New Normal – Medhanie Gaim).

== Fellowship and honorary memberships ==
EGOS Honorary Member

Fellow of the Academy of Management

Fellow of the Academy of the Social Sciences in Australia, 1988

Distinguished Fellow ANZAM

Fellow of the British Academy of the Social Sciences

Fellow of the Aston Society of Fellows

== Recent works ==
Recently Clegg has been publishing on a broad front that includes contributions to sociology, organisation studies and strategy. Amongst his most recent interests has been exploration of the theme of liquid modernity and what it means for contemporary organisation and organisations. Presently he is working on two four volume collections of classics in Power and Political Theory and Power and Organization Theory with Mark Haugaard.

== Biography ==
Born in Bradford, England, Clegg migrated to Australia in 1976, after completing his first degree in Behavioural Science (Sociology) at the University of Aston and a doctorate in Management at Bradford University. Apart from a brief period at the University of St Andrews as professor of organization studies and head of the Department of Management from 1990 to 1993, he has been an Australian resident since that time.

== Bibliography ==
Recent books include:

- Clegg, S.R., Skyttermoen, T. and Vaagaasar, A.L. (2020) Project Management - a Value Creation Approach. London:Sage ISBN 9781526494610
- Clegg, S. R., Carter, C, Kornberger, M., and Schweitzer, J. (2011) Strategy: Theory & Practice, London: Sage.
- Harris, M., Hopfl, H., and Clegg, S. R. (eds) (2010) Managing Modernity: Beyond Bureaucracy, Oxford: Oxford University Press.
- Clegg. S. R. (ed.) (2010) SAGE Directions in Organization Studies (Volumes I-IV), London: Sage.
- Clegg, S. R., and Haugaard, M. (eds) (2009) Handbook of Power, London: Sage.
- Clegg, S. R. and Cooper, C. (eds) (2009) Handbook of Macro Organizational Behaviour, London Sage.
- Roe, R, Waller, M, and Clegg, S. R. (eds) (2008) Time in Organizational Research: Approaches and Methods, London: Routledge. ISBN 9780415460453.
- Carter, C., Clegg, S. R., Kornberger, M. (2008) A Very Short, Fairly Interesting and Reasonably Cheap Book about Studying Strategy, London: Sage.
- Clegg, S. R. & Bailey, J. (eds) (2008) International Encyclopaedia of Organization Studies, (In Four Volumes), Thousand Oaks, CA: Sage.
