= Steve Odell =

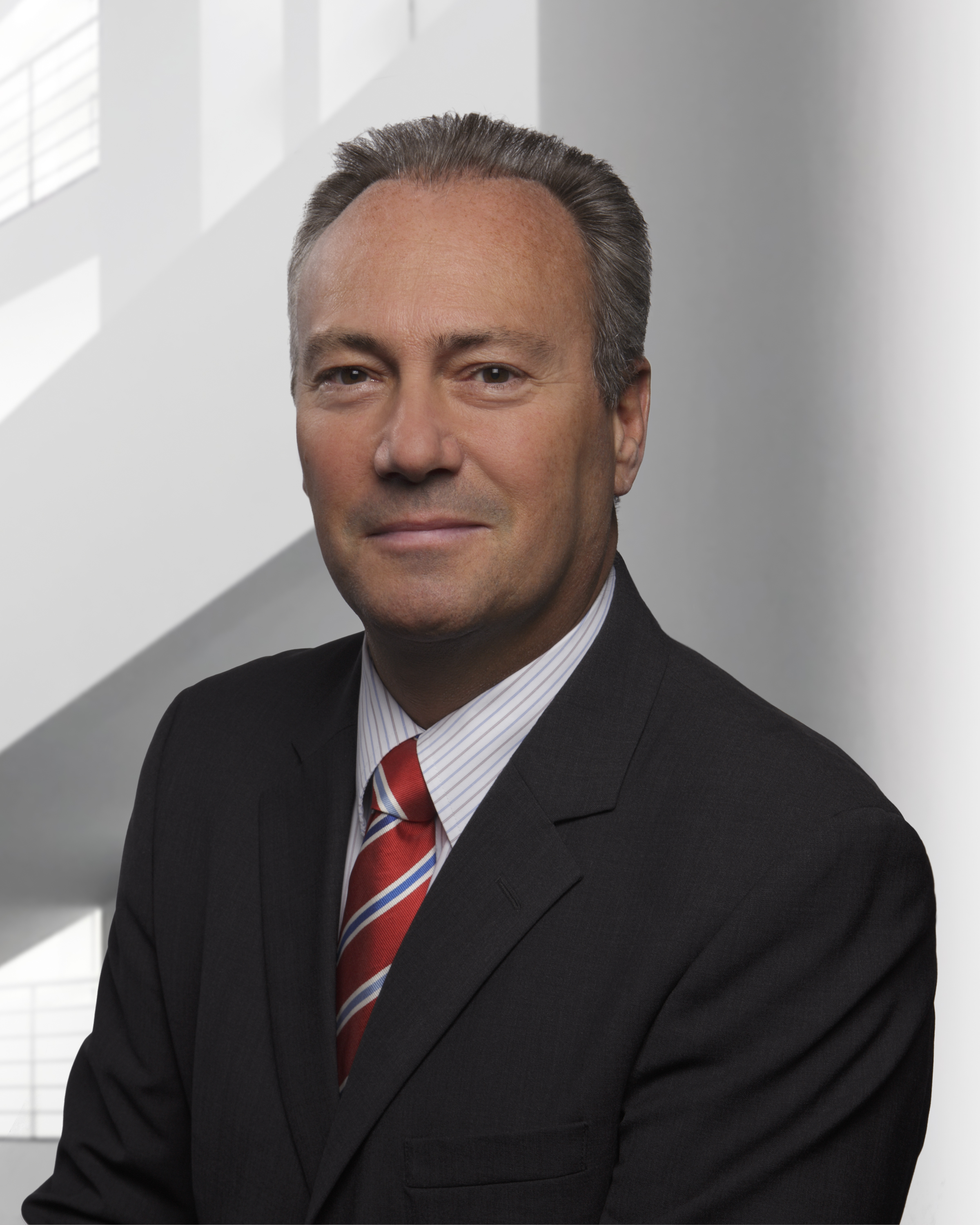
Odell in 2010

Stephen Terence Odell (born 24 February 1955) is a former automotive executive who spent all of his career with the Ford Motor Company, and its various subsidiaries: Jaguar, Mazda, and Volvo Car Corporation. His last role at Ford Motor Company was executive vice president of global marketing, sales and service.

== Early life, education, and family ==
He was born in Romford, when part of Essex, now in the London Borough of Havering. He holds a Bachelor of Arts in Business Studies from the University of Brighton. He is married, with two children, and is a supporter of Tottenham Hotspur F.C.

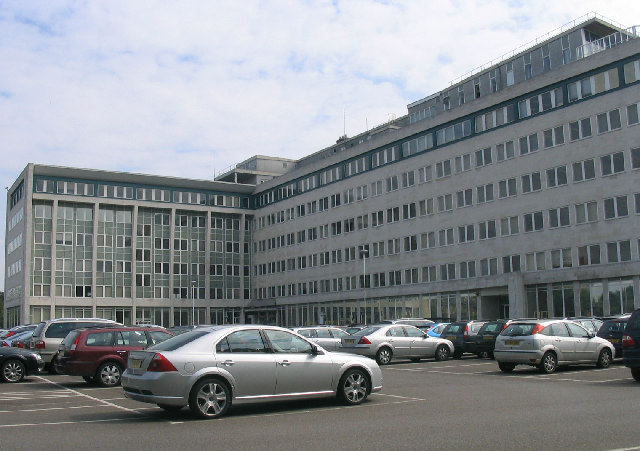
Ford headquarters in Essex

== Career ==
He joined the Ford Motor Company as a graduate trainee in 1980 working his way up through several management positions in the marketing and sales function in both the United Kingdom and the United States. In 1997 he was appointed as a vice president of marketing and sales for Jaguar North America.

=== Mazda ===
In January 2000 Odell was appointed to the position of vice president of marketing and sales, Mazda Motor North America based in Orange County, California, where he was responsible for US sales, national advertising, sales incentives and promotion, marketing, and customer loyalty programs. He later became executive vice president and chief operating officer of Mazda Motor North America in October 2000. In January 2002, he was promoted to president and chief executive officer of Mazda Europe, based in the company's regional headquarters in Germany. In May 2003, he was elected senior managing executive officer, marketing, sales and customer services, Mazda Motor Corporation, based in Fuchū, Hiroshima, Japan, reporting to Mazda CEO Lewis Booth.

=== Ford of Europe ===
From September 2005 to April 2008 Odell was a Ford Motor Company vice president, and vice president of marketing, sales and service, Ford of Europe, responsible for all marketing, sales and customer service activities in the European region, based in Cologne, Germany. In April 2008, he became chief operating officer of Ford of Europe where he was responsible for product development, manufacturing, purchasing, and marketing, sales and service operations.

=== Volvo ===
From 1 October 2008 he was president and chief executive officer of Volvo Car Corporation, once again reporting to Lewis Booth who was executive vice president for Ford Motor Company responsible for Ford of Europe, Volvo Car Corporation and Ford Export Operations & Global Growth Initiatives. In this role Odell was based in Volvo headquarters in Gothenburg, Sweden, and was responsible for the entire Volvo business, and tasked with leading the company's drive toward sustained profitability through continued restructuring and the accelerated development of high-quality, fuel-efficient and safe vehicles in the premium end of the market. In this role he led a significant restructuring and successful financial turnaround whilst also shepherding the company through an extremely complex sale process that required intense focus on sustaining momentum during an uncertain time.

=== Ford of Europe ===
Following the completion of Volvo's sale to Zhejiang Geely Holding Group in August 2010, Odell returned to Ford as a group president and chief executive officer of Ford of Europe in August 2010, reporting to Ford CEO Alan Mulally. In December 2012, his remit was expanded when he was appointed executive vice president and President of Europe, Middle East, and Africa, reporting to then-Ford chief operating officer Mark Fields. He was instrumental in leading the development and implementation of Ford’s European transformation plan, with a focus on using the One Ford plan to achieve profitable growth through a focus on new products, brand and increased cost efficiency. He also was responsible for the strategic development of the company’s Middle East and Africa operations to take advantage of growth opportunities in the region.

=== Global Marketing, Sales, and Service ===
Odell became executive vice president of global marketing, sales and service on 1 January 2015 and was based at the company's world headquarters in Dearborn. In this role, he led Ford's efforts to improve the Ford and Lincoln brand images globally by connecting more closely with customers. He swapped roles with Jim Farley, who in turn gained operational responsibility for Ford's activities in Europe, Middle East and Africa. Initially reporting to Ford CEO Mark Fields, he then reported to Jim Farley who was promoted to executive vice president and president, global markets, following the departure of Ford CEO Mark Fields and subsequent reorganisation in May 2017. Odell continued on until November 2017 when he elected to retire after 37 years service at the company. At the time Jim Hackett, CEO of Ford said:

Stephen has made significant contributions to Ford, including laying the groundwork for our turnaround in Europe and positioning us for success as we continue to create a world-class global marketing and sales organization. In addition, he has mentored and helped develop many of our next generation of leaders. We appreciate his many years of service and wish him well in the future.

Business positions
Preceded by John Fleming	Chief Executive of Ford of Europe; August 2010 – January 2015	Succeeded by Jim Farley
Preceded by Fredrik Arp	Chief Executive of Volvo Cars; October 2008 – August 2010	Succeeded by Stefan Jacoby
Preceded by	Chief Operating Officer of Ford of Europe; April 2008 – October 2008	Succeeded by
