= Nord Department =

Nord Department may refer to:

- Nord (French department)
- Nord (Haitian department)
- Nord Department (Ivory Coast), a defunct department of Ivory Coast

== See also ==
- Nord (disambiguation)
