= Ford Bantam =

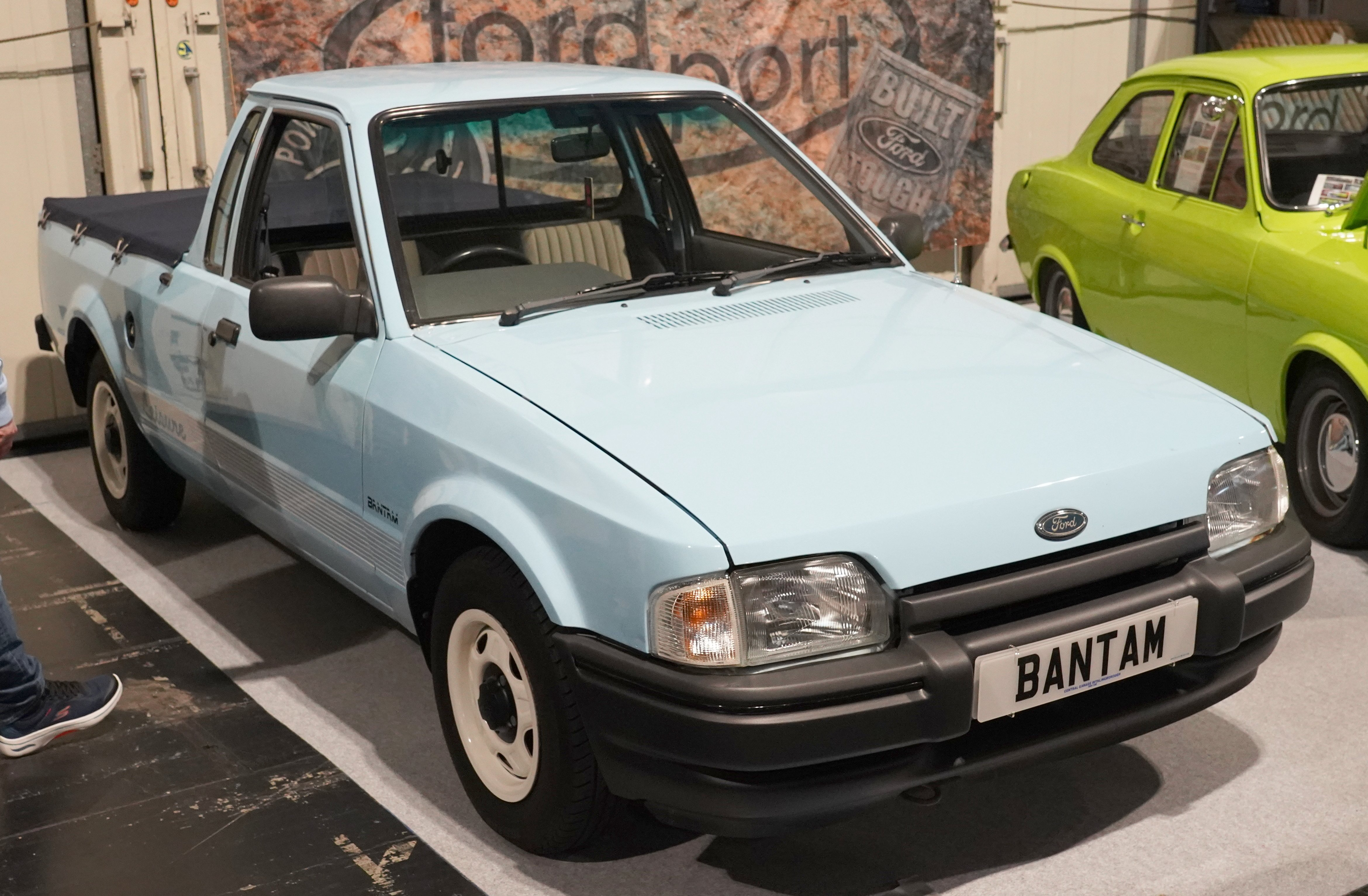
- First generation Ford Bantam

Overview
- Manufacturer: Ford Motor Company of Southern Africa (1983–1985); Samcor (1985–1994); Ford Motor Company of Southern Africa (1994–2011)
- Also called: Mazda Rustler (1983–2001)
- Production: 1983–2011
- Model years: 1983–1990 (based on Mark III Ford Escort); 1990–2001 (based on Mark V Mazda 323); 2002–2011 (based on Mark V Ford Fiesta)
- Assembly: South Africa: Struandale, Port Elizabeth; South Africa: Silverton, Pretoria

Body and chassis
- Class: Coupé utility
- Layout: Front-engine, front-wheel-drive

Powertrain
- Engine: Transversely-mounted I4; front-wheel-drive transaxle

The Ford Bantam is a coupé utility/pickup (known in South African English as a 'Bakkie') produced in South Africa. Production of the Bantam spanned three generations, with the vehicle produced in South Africa for sale within the South African market.

== History ==
Introduced in South Africa in 1983, the Bantam enjoyed success both as a rugged compact commercial vehicle, and as a leisure-oriented private vehicle. It was discontinued in 2011 without immediate replacement.

== Background ==
Coupe utility pickups such as the Bantam are popular in South Africa as a more affordable, compact and fuel-efficient alternative to larger commercial pickups such as the Toyota Hilux, Nissan Navara and Ford's own Ranger. Their compact size and ease of handling means they are viable not just as light- to medium-duty commercial vehicles, but also as everyday transport.

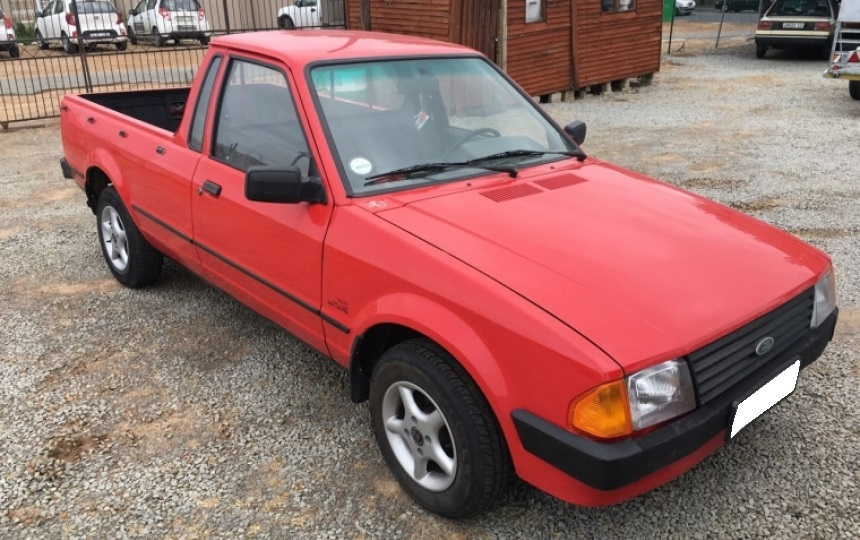
First-generation Ford Bantam with aftermarket alloy wheels

Pickups intended for heavy commercial use (in South Africa, the so-called one-tonner class) tend to be based around a steel ladder-frame chassis, with the cab and load box mounted separately. In this class, petrol-driven engines are generally between 2,000 cc and 4,000 cc in displacement, and diesel engines are generally between 2,000 cc and 3,200 cc. The vehicles are usually rated to carry loads of between 900 and 1,100 kilograms (2,000 and 2,400 lb).

By contrast, the shells of compact pickups such as the Bantam (known as half-tonners) are almost always of monocoque (unibody) configuration. This yields greater commonality of parts with the passenger cars they are based on, as well as easier assembly on a parallel production line. They generally have around 35% less tare mass than a typical 'one-tonner', their engines generally displace between 1,300 cc and 1,800 cc, and they are usually rated to carry loads of no more than 800 kilograms (1,800 lb).

=== First generation (1983–1990) ===
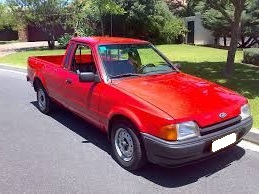
First-generation Ford Bantam (facelift)

The first-generation Bantam was introduced in South Africa in 1983. It was intended to compete for market share that was, at the time, almost entirely monopolised by Nissan's B140 1400 Bakkie (which had been derived from the B110 sedan), with the remainder accounted for by the recently released Volkswagen Caddy. The Bantam (named after a breed of fowl known for its small size and courageous, defiant nature) was based on the Mark III Ford Escort. It featured a South African-developed load box, tailgate, rear lights, rear quarter windows and leaf-sprung, dead-axle rear suspension.

Like the Escort on which it was based, the Bantam was initially available with 1,296 cc and 1,598 cc carburettor-fed versions of Ford's compound valve-angle hemi (CVH) engine. Faced with criticism from the South African market regarding noise, vibration, harshness and unreasonably high fuel consumption, Ford South Africa opted to discontinue CVH engine installation. Subsequently, South African Escorts and Bantams were fitted with crossflow variants of the technically obsolete Kent engine.

The Bantam was initially produced at the Ford plant in Struandale, Port Elizabeth. Upon Ford's apartheid-era divestment from South Africa, Bantam production was relocated to the Samcor plant in Silverton, Pretoria. The exterior tailgate panels on pre-divestment Bantams and Rustlers have 'Ford' or 'Mazda' script pressed into them, while post-divestment vehicles have 'MMI' script.

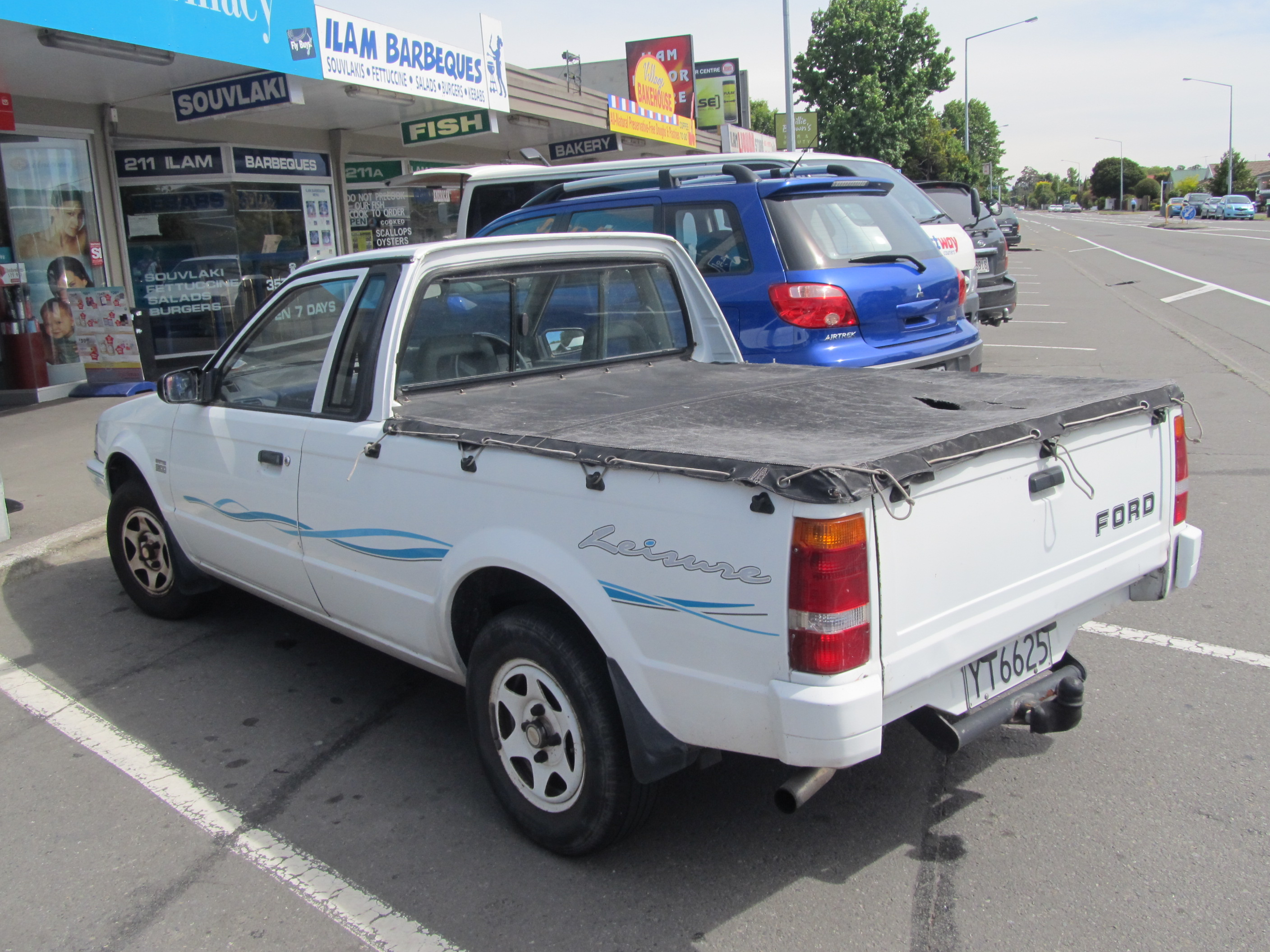
Ford Bantam, second generation (rear view)

Within the South African market, the Bantam was also available as the Mazda Rustler.

=== Second generation (1990–2001) ===
In 1990, the Escort-derived Bantam was replaced with a Mazda 323-derived model. To save on research and development costs, the new Bantam used a slightly modified version of the existing load box from the previous Bantam. Re-styling and finishing of the new vehicle were undertaken by Samcor's in-house design studio. The new Bantam was the first South African-produced vehicle to be subjected to computer-modelled finite-element stress analysis, and also benefitted from accelerated durability testing conducted by the University of Pretoria. As before, the vehicle was also available as a Mazda Rustler.

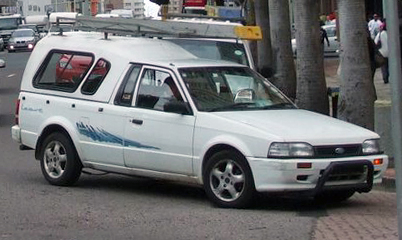
Ford Bantam (second generation)

323-derived Bantams and Rustlers were available in various trim levels, and with a choice of three different petrol engines: a 1,323 cc carburettor-fed Mazda B3 engine producing 50 kW, a 1,597 cc carburettor-fed Mazda B6 engine producing 60 kW, and a 1,597 cc fuel-injected variant of the B6 engine that produced 77 kW.

Luxury-specification 60 kW versions featuring cloth-covered bucket seats, a sports steering wheel and bodywork decals were also available. The Ford variant was badged the Explorer, while the Mazda variant was badged the Drifter.

=== Third generation (2002–2011) ===
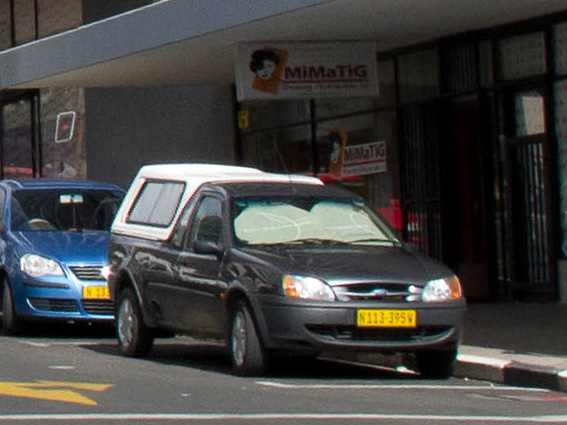
Ford Bantam (third generation)

The third-generation Bantam was launched in 2002, based on the fifth-generation Ford Fiesta. As with the Mazda 323-derived Bantam, the Fiesta-derived Bantam retained a modified version of the Bantam Mark I load box and rear suspension. Production continued at the Silverton plant. Though the Mazda 121 (a re-badged Ford Fiesta) was available in South Africa, demand was judged sufficiently low that a Mazda-rebadged Bantam was never produced.

==== Initial version (2002–2006) ====
The third-generation Bantam was initially made available with a choice of 1,297 cc and 1,597 cc Rocam (Roller Finger Camshaft) petrol engines, and a normally-aspirated 1,755 cc Endura-D diesel engine. Being a low-cost derivative of the multi-valve Zetec-SE that was intended for developing markets, the Brazilian-designed Rocam engine is of single overhead-cam configuration with two valves per cylinder.

Rocam-engined Bantams were available in four different trim levels, with bucket seats as standard equipment on all Bantams. Basic (fleet) versions featured austere interiors with vinyl seat trim, and no air conditioning, power steering or audio system. XL versions featured Jacquard cloth upholstery, 14-inch alloy wheels, four-speaker sound systems, full instrumentation, power steering and air conditioning. In addition to XL-level features, XLT versions featured electric windows, electrically-adjustable mirrors, front fog lights, colour-coded exterior mirrors and front bumper. In addition to XLT-level features, XLE versions featured colour-coded exterior door handles, white-faced race-style instrumentation, driver and passenger airbags, and pyrotechnic seat-belt tensioners. Endura-D-engined Bantams were available in basic and XL trim levels.

==== First facelift (2006–2009) ====
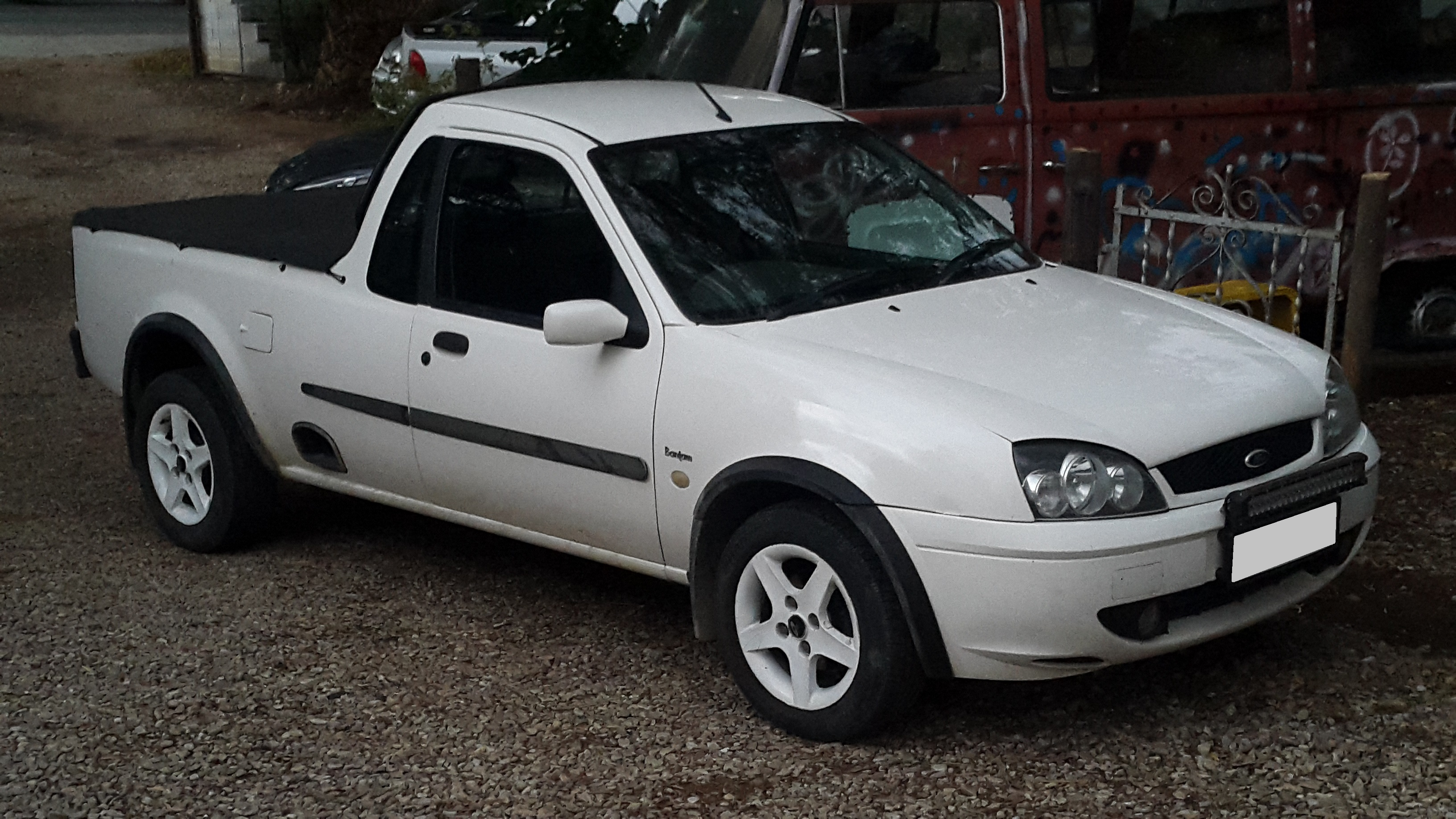
Third-generation Ford Bantam 1.6i XLT (first facelift) with aftermarket alloy wheels and LED light bar

In 2006, the Bantam underwent minor restyling as part of a mid-life upgrade. The instrumentation cluster was simplified, the double-filament headlights were replaced with headlights featuring separate bulbs for dipped and main beams, the rear lights and front fog lights were redesigned, and different alloy wheels were installed on XL, XLT and XLE versions. The diesel engine option was no longer available.

==== Second facelift (2009–2011) ====
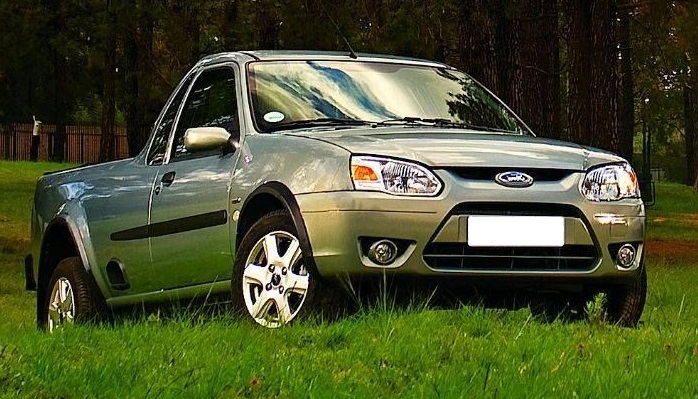
Third-generation Ford Bantam 1.6i XLE (second facelift)

In 2009, the Bantam received a second mid-life upgrade consisting of all-new bonnet, headlights, front bumper, rear lights, 'liquid chrome' nomenclature, instrument cluster and interior trim. Rocam-engined versions also received catalytic convertors, this facelift would make it more in line with the Indian Ikon, which also bore the same front end after it was facelifted in 2008. To counter the challenge posed by more modern half-ton pickups with advanced turbodiesel engines (such as the Opel Corsa Utility), Ford South Africa also offered the 1,399 cc DuraTorq engine option.

In 2011, Ford South Africa ended production of the Bantam, focussing its marketing efforts on the larger and more expensive Ranger. In 2013, Ford USA followed suit, discontinuing imports of the Brazilian-made Courier. With no equivalent replacement available, Ford's support for the half-ton coupe utility segment effectively ended.

==== Similarity to Ford Courier ====
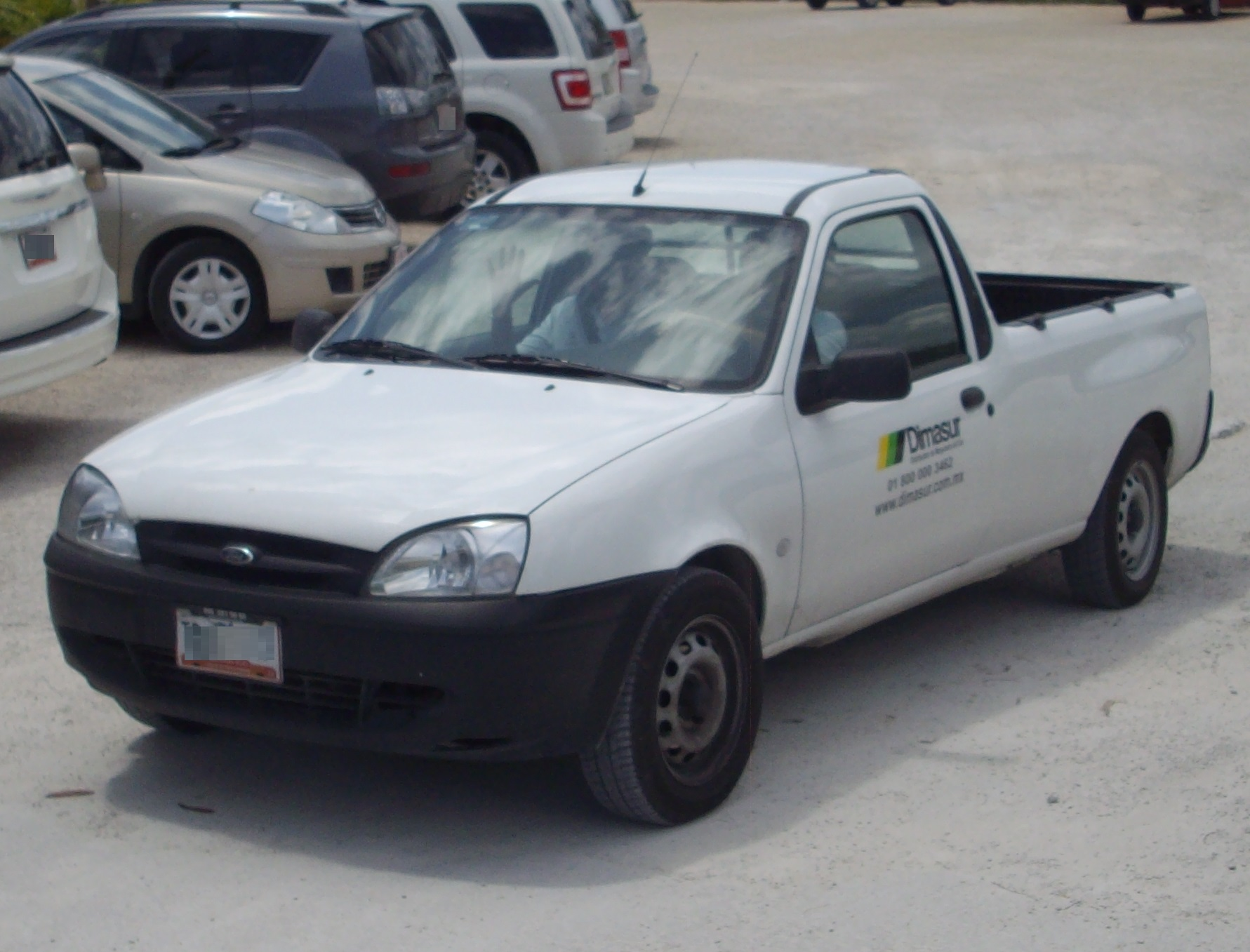
2000–2010 Ford Courier pickup (Brazil)

Another coupe pickup was derived from the fifth-generation Fiesta, independently of the Bantam. The resulting vehicle, the Ford Courier, was designed and produced in Brazil, initially for the Brazilian domestic market. Aft of the vehicle A-pillars, the Bantam and Courier share almost no common parts. Whereas the Bantam uses the shorter front doors of the Ford Ikon and 5-door Fiesta hatchback in conjunction with rear quarter windows, the Courier uses the longer front doors from the 3-door Fiesta hatchback, with no quarter windows. In addition, after the Bantam was facelifted in 2009, it and the Courier did not share a similar front end. Production of the Fiesta-based Courier ended in 2013.

== Future Developments ==
Following the discontinuation of the Fiesta-derived Bantam, Fiat South Africa's withdrawal of the Palio-derived Strada and General Motors' disinvestment from the South African market (effectively ending production of the Spark-derived Chevrolet Utility), the Renault Logan-derived Nissan NP200 is the only remaining half-ton coupe utility on the South African market as of November 2024.

South Africa's deteriorating economy, combined with the relative unaffordability of larger pickups such as the Toyota Hilux and Ford Ranger mean that demand for a Bantam replacement has never abated. Since the end of Bantam production, unconfirmed rumours have circulated regarding plans by Ford South Africa to replace the Bantam with a direct equivalent. As of 2024, no such vehicle has yet been produced.

Rumours continue to circulate that Ford USA may develop a replacement for the Brazilian Courier, possibly based on the next-generation Focus platform. If cleared for production, the new vehicle could be released by 2022. However, after the coronavirus pandemic, Ford stopped manufacturing in Brazil and switched to solely selling imported vehicles in Brazil.
