= Nord =

Nord, a word meaning "north" in several European languages, may refer to:

== Acronyms ==
- National Organization for Rare Disorders, an American nonprofit organization
- New Orleans Recreation Department, New Orleans, Louisiana, US

== Film and television ==
- Nord (1991 film), a film directed by Xavier Beauvois
- Nord (2009 film), or North, a Norwegian film directed by Rune Denstad Langlo

== Music ==
- Nord (Siddharta album), 2001
- Nord (Year of No Light album), 2006
- Nord, an album by Luna Amară, 2018
- Nord, an album by Alfa, 2021
- Nord, the brand name for electronic keyboards and percussion synthesizers produced by Clavia.
- A. G. NORD, the fifth disc from the album 7G, by A. G. Cook.
- Nord (Gåte album), 2021

== People ==
- Bjorn Nord (born 1972), Swedish ice hockey player
- Christiane Nord (born 1943), German translation scholar
- Daniel Nord, Swedish civil servant
- Elizabeth Nord (1902–1986), American labor organizer
- Haavard Nord, Norwegian software expert
- John Nord (born 1959), American professional wrestler
- Karl Nord (1912–2003), German anti-Nazi activist
- Kathleen Nord (born 1965), German swimmer
- Keith Nord (born 1957), American football player
- Ole Tom Nord (born 1940), Norwegian skier
- Orla Nord (1875–?), Danish cyclist
- Pierre Nord (1900–1985), French writer and spy
- Richard Nord, film editor
- Thomas Nord (born 1957), German politician (Die Linke)
- Walter R. Nord (born 1939), American academic

== Places ==
- Nord (Chamber of Deputies of Luxembourg constituency), an electoral constituency
- Nord (French department)
- Nord (Haitian department)
- Nord, California, US, an unincorporated community
- Nord, Greenland, a military and scientific base
- Nord Region (Burkina Faso)
- Nord Region (Cameroon)
- Northern Canada (French: Nord du Canada)

== Transportation ==
- Nord (yacht), a German-built superyacht
- Nord Aviation, a former state-owned French aircraft manufacturer
- Chemins de fer du Nord, or the Nord company, a French railway company
- Nord Automobiles aka Nord Motion, a Nigerian automaker

== Other uses ==
- Nord University, a public university in Norway
- NORD (ice hockey team), a defunct Ukrainian amateur team
- Nord (novel), published in English as North, a 1960 novel by Louis-Ferdinand Céline
- Nord (video game), a 2009 Facebook video game
- 12501 Nord, an asteroid
- 6th SS Mountain Division Nord, a WaffenSS division in World War II
- OnePlus Nord, a smartphone 5G by OnePlus
- Nords, a fictional race in the Elder Scrolls fantasy setting
- Nord Pool, a pan-European electric power exchange
- NordVPN, a VPN service

== See also ==
- Gare du Nord (disambiguation)
- North (disambiguation)
- Norte (disambiguation), Spanish, Portuguese and Galician for north
