= Debra L. Shapiro =

American scholar

Academic background
- Education: BA, psychology, 1982, University of Maryland, College Park; MS, Organization Behavior, 1983, Kellogg School of Management; PhD, Organization Behavior, 1986, Northwestern University
- Thesis: Deceptive communication in bargaining context: does hedging enhance the bluffer's chance of gaining trust, pardon, and integrative agreements? (1986)

Debra Lynn Shapiro is an American scholar in organizational behavior. She is the Clarice Smith Professor of Management at the University of Maryland, College Park, having formally served as the Willard Graham Distinguished Professor at the University of North Carolina at Chapel Hill.

== Early life and education ==
Shapiro completed her Bachelor of Arts degree from the University of Maryland, College Park before enrolling at Northwestern University for her Master's degree from Kellogg School of Management and PhD.

== Career ==
Upon completing her PhD, Shapiro accepted an assistant professor position at the University of North Carolina at Chapel Hill (UNC). In this role, she led UNC's business school and PhD programs. She served as their Willard Graham Distinguished Professor from 2000 until 2003 when she left UNC for her alma mater, the University of Maryland, College Park.

In 2006, while working as an associate editor of the Academy of Management Journal, Shapiro was appointed the Clarice Smith Professor of Management and Organization. Two years later, she replaced Lawrence A. Gordon as the director of the Smith School's doctoral program start July 1, 2008. Her achievements in these two roles helped earn her an election to president of the Academy of Management from 2015 to 2016. At the start of her presidency, Shapiro was the runner-up for the 2014 best paper award in the Academy of Management Learning and Education for her article "Scholarly Impact: A Pluralist Conceptualization." In the same year, she was also the co-recipient of an Interdisciplinary and Engaged Research Seed Grant from the ADVANCE Program for Inclusion Excellence for her co-led project, Gender in the Boardroom and Corporate Crime: An Empirical Study.

In 2018, Shapiro was listed among the top 100 most influential authors in organizational behavior, human resource management, strategy and general management as cited in textbooks from the journal Academy of Management Learning and Education. Later, during the COVID-19 pandemic, Shapiro was recognised as being in the top 2% of the most-cited scholars and scientists worldwide.
