= Northern Province =

Northern Province or North Province may refer to:

- North Province (Cameroon), known as North Region from 2008
- Far North Province, Cameroon, known as Far North Region from 2008
- North Kazakhstan Province
- Northern Province, Rwanda, created January 2006
- North Province, Maldives
- North Province, New Caledonia
- Northern Province, Papua New Guinea, also known as Oro Province (redirects)
- Northern Province, Sierra Leone
- Northern Province, Sri Lanka
- Northern Province (Victoria), a former electorate in the Victorian Legislative Council (Australia)
- North Province (Western Australia), a former electorate in the Western Australian Legislative Council
- Northern Province, Zambia
- Limpopo province, South Africa, formerly known as Northern Province
- Northern Cape province, South Africa, part of the former Cape Province
- Uttar Pradesh, India (Hindi: Uttar = North, Pradesh = province/region/state)
- North Sumatra (Sumatra Utara) - a province in Indonesia
- North Sulawesi (Sulawesi Utara) - a province in Indonesia
- North Maluku (Maluku Utara) - a province in Indonesia
- Province of York, an ecclesiastical province of the Church of England

In fiction, "North Province" may refer to:

- The predecessor state of North Kingdom in the World of Greyhawk campaign setting for the Dungeons & Dragons roleplaying game.

== See also ==
- Northern Provinces, an area used in the World Geographic Scheme for Recording Plant Distributions
- Nord, various places named as "north" in other languages
