= Lewis Booth (businessman) =

British businessman (born 1948)

Lewis William Killcross Booth CBE (born 7 November 1948) is a British accountant and business executive. He is currently on the board of directors for Rolls-Royce, for Mondelez International, Inc, and Gentherm Inc. He previously had a 34-year career at Ford where he rose to the rank of Executive Vice-President and Chief Financial Officer, responsible for Ford's financial operations, including the Controller's Office, Treasury and Investor Relations, a position he held from November 2008 until April 2012.

Booth was appointed Commander of the Order of the British Empire (CBE) in the 2012 Birthday Honours for services to the UK automotive and manufacturing industries.

== Early life and education ==
Born in Liverpool, England, the son of a Ford, Austin and Morris dealer, Booth has always had a passion for cars and the automotive industry.

Graduating in 1970 from the University of Liverpool with a bachelor of engineering degree with honours in mechanical engineering, he subsequently qualified as a chartered management accountant. He started his career at British Leyland before joining Ford in 1978 as a financial analyst in Product Development for Ford of Europe.

== Career ==
=== Ford of Europe ===
During the 1980s and early 1990s, Booth held a series of management positions in Ford of Europe in Britain and in Germany in Finance Staff, Truck Operations, Product Development, Manufacturing, and Sales.

=== Ford North America ===
In 1992, he moved to the United States where he worked for Finance Staff in Dearborn. From 1993 to 1996, Booth held a variety of positions in Car Product Development, Body & Assembly, Vehicle Operations and the Manufacturing Business Office for Ford Automotive Operations before accepting the position of Group managing director at Samcor in South Africa.

=== International Assignments ===
From August 1997 to January 2000, Booth served as Group managing director of Samcor. At that time, Ford had 45% equity in Samcor, which assembled Ford and Mazda vehicles in South Africa. Subsequently, the Samcor joint venture was dissolved and Ford Motor Company of Southern Africa was established.

Booth was promoted President, Asia Pacific and Africa Operations for Ford Motor Company, a position he held from 1 January 2000. In this role, he had operational responsibility for South Africa, Australia, New Zealand and India and for developing Ford's strategy in the Asia-Pacific region.

=== Mazda ===
Between 2002 and 2003, Booth succeeded Mark Fields as president and then chairman of Mazda based in Hiroshima, Japan, where he oversaw the implementation of the company's highly successful Millennium Plan and the return of the rotary engine in the RX-8. He is widely credited for leading the turnaround and renaissance of Mazda.

=== Ford of Europe and Premier Automotive Group ===
Following his stint at Mazda, Booth returned to Ford of Europe in Cologne succeeding Martin Leach as President and COO from September 2003 to April 2004. In April 2004, he was promoted to group vice-president Ford Motor Company and chairman and CEO, Ford of Europe. In October 2005, he replaced Mark Fields as Executive Vice-President Ford of Europe and Premier Automotive Group, responsible for Ford of Europe, Aston Martin, Jaguar, Land Rover, and Volvo, and divided his time between Cologne and Ford's Ingeni building in Soho, London. It was in this role he oversaw the sale of Aston Martin to Kuwaiti investors in March 2007 and Jaguar Land Rover to Tata Motors in June 2008. As Ford implemented its One Ford plan and divested itself of its luxury brands that made up Premier Automotive Group, his job title and responsibilities changed to reflect this as he became Executive Vice-President for Ford Motor Company responsible for Ford of Europe, Volvo Car Corporation and Ford Export Operations & Global Growth Initiatives. He was also chairman of both Ford of Europe and Volvo Car Corporation.

=== Ford Chief Financial Officer & EVP ===
In November 2008, then-Ford CEO Alan Mulally, moved him to his final role at Ford Motor Company, becoming Executive Vice-President and Chief Financial Officer once again based in Dearborn. In this role, he engineered Ford's largest ever debt restructuring in 2009, led the sale of Volvo to Geely in 2010, and paid Ford's first dividend in 5 years in March 2012. He retired from Ford in April 2012.
