= John Fleming (engineer) =

John Fleming (born 30 January 1951) is a British engineer, and a former senior executive at Ford.

== Early life ==
He grew up in Toxteth. He was born in the Dingle, Liverpool. He attended St. Margaret's Church of England School in Aigburth. His mother was a sewing machinist on the trim at Halewood.

He studied Production Engineering at North East London Polytechnic (since 1992 the University of East London).

== Career ==
=== Ford ===
He joined Ford in 1967 aged 16 at the Halewood Body & Assembly, as a manufacturing apprentice.

He became Production Manager of the plant's paint facility in 1984, making the well-known Ford Escort. In 1988 he became responsible for Paint, Trim and Chassis Engineering across Ford of Europe. He returned to Halewood in 1991 as a General Manufacturing Manager, becoming Operations Manager of the plant in 1993. In 1995 he moved to Ford in the USA. In April 2001 he became head of manufacturing for Ford of Europe.

From 1 October 2005 to December 2009 he was Chief Executive and Chairman of Ford of Europe. At the time Ford of Europe also owned Volvo Cars. Under him, Ford unveiled the Ford Mondeo (third generation) in September 2007 at the Paris Motor Show. Towards the end of his tenure at Ford of Europe, his main competitor, GM Europe was facing the possibility of collapse. He was headquartered in Cologne (Cologne Body & Assembly). The sixth generation of the Ford Fiesta debuted in February 2008; these were built at Cologne and the Ford Valencia Plant; at the time there were discussions about changing the model's name. The second generation of the Ford Ka debuted in July 2009, being developed with Fiat, with the same chassis as the Fiat 500 (2007); at this point the Ford Ka had sold 1.4m worldwide. In March 2010, Ford became Europe's best-selling car-brand, overtaking Volkswagen, selling 192,000 cars in that month, with 10% market share. In September 2012, the Ford Focus became the world's best-selling car, selling 489,000 models in sixth months worldwide.

He retired from Ford in December 2015.

== Personal life ==
He is married and has two sons and a daughter.

== See also ==
- Roelant de Waard, former Chairman and Managing Director of Ford of Britain

Business positions
Preceded by	Chief Executive of Ford of Europe; September 2005 - December 2009	Succeeded by Steve Odell
Preceded by	Chairman of Ford of Europe; October 2004 - December 2009	Succeeded by Steve Odell
