= El Norte =

El Norte ("The North" in Spanish) may refer to:

- El Norte (film), 1983, directed by Gregory Nava
- El Norte: The Epic and Forgotten Story of Hispanic North America, a 2019 history book
- El Norte (Monterrey), a Mexican daily newspaper, published in the state of Nuevo Léon
- El Norte, a gang in the television series Oz
- El Norte, an album by the Gotan Project
- El Norte (Region), an administrative district of the Spanish Empire created in 1776
- Northern Mexico (el Norte de México), present-day northern Mexico

== See also ==
- The North (disambiguation)
- Norte (disambiguation)
