= James R. Bailey =

American business scholar

James Russell Bailey
- Occupations: Academic, researcher, author
- Years active: 1991-present
- Board member of: Center for Social Leadership (2012-present), Universal Strategic Consulting Services (2012-present)

Academic background
- Education: Eastern Illinois University (B.A.), Washington University (M.A., Ph.D.)
- Thesis: Individual and situational determinants of decision making: the role of need for cognition and response mode. (1991)
- Doctoral advisor: Walter Nord, Richard deCharms, Jane Loevinger, Michael Strube

Academic work
- Discipline: Business
- Sub-discipline: Management, leadership, organizational behavior
- Institutions: George Washington University; London Business School; Rutgers University
- Website: lessonsonleadership.org/about-james-bailey/

James Russell Bailey is an American business scholar who is a professor of management and Hochberg Professorial Fellow of Leadership Development at George Washington University and Fellow in the Centre of Management Development at London Business School. He co-founded the Academy of Management Learning and Education and was its editor-in-chief. He is founder and Managing Editor of Lessons on Leadership, an online magazine. Bailey is known for his work on effective leadership, organizational change, and business ethics and education. Bailey is a member of the Consortium for Research on Emotional Intelligence in Organizations. He was among the first scholars to write on remote working and its effects on the economy and on American urban life and downtown, arguing that humans aren't predisposed to work from home. Bailey also wrote on the resistance of the labor force to return to office, and on the COVID-19 pandemic and its social, economic, mental, and emotional ramifications.

== Biography ==
Bailey was born to Buck and Mary Bailey. He completed a B.A. at Eastern Illinois University in 1984. Bailey earned a M.A. (1988) and Ph.D. (1991) at Arts and Sciences at Washington University in St. Louis and Olin Business School. He has received the award for excellence in teaching. His dissertation was titled Individual and situational determinants of decision making: the role of need for cognition and response mode. Bailey's doctoral advisor was Michael Strube.

From 1988 to 1991, Bailey worked as an instructor at Washington University in St. Louis. From 1991 to 1999, Bailey worked at Rutgers University, first as assistant professor (1991–1997), and then as associate dean (1997–1999). He was a fellow at the Center for Management Development at London Business School from 2006 to 2011. Bailey was an associate professor at George Washington University School of Business from 1999 to 2004, and has been a full professor since 2004 and a GWU's Fellow at the Institute of Public Policy since 2021. He was chair of the department of management at GWU from 2008 to 2011. He is a member of the executive advisory board of the Center for Social Leadership.

== Awards and honors ==
- Best Paper Award, American Psychological Association Centennial Celebration of William James, 1990.
- Most Promising New Management Book, European Academy of Management, 2006
- Outstanding Academic Book, American Library Association, 2008

== Selected publications ==
=== Edited textbooks ===
- Kessler, Eric H., and James R. Bailey. Handbook of organizational and managerial wisdom. Sage Publications, 2007.
- Clegg, Stewart, and James R. Bailey, eds. International encyclopedia of organization studies. Sage Publications, 2007.

=== Journal articles ===
- Bailey, James, and Cameron Ford. "Management as science versus management as practice in postgraduate business education." Business Strategy Review 7, no. 4 (1996): 7–12. doi:10.1111/j.1467-8616.1996.tb00136.x
- Bailey, James R., Patrick Saparito, Kenneth Kressel, Edward Christensen, and Robert Hooijberg. "A model for reflective pedagogy." Journal of Management Education 21, no. 2 (1997): 155–167. doi:10.1177/105256299702100202
- Bailey, James R., Chao C. Chen, and Sheng-Gong Dou. "Conceptions of self and performance-related feedback in the US, Japan and China." Journal of International Business Studies 28 (1997): 605–625. doi:10.1057/palgrave.jibs.8490113
- Eastman, Wayne, and James R. Bailey. "Crossroads—mediating the fact-value antinomy: Patterns in managerial and legal rhetoric, 1890–1990." Organization Science 9, no. 2 (1998): 231–245. doi:10.1287/orsc.9.2.231
- Wiesenfeld, Batia M., Joel Brockner, Barbara Petzall, Richard Wolf, and James Bailey. "Stress and coping among layoff survivors: A self-affirmation analysis." Anxiety, Stress and Coping 14, no. 1 (2001): 15–34. doi:10.1080/10615800108248346
- Bailey, James, and Ruth H. Axelrod. "Leadership lessons from Mount Rushmore: An interview with James MacGregor Burns." The Leadership Quarterly 12, no. 1 (2001): 113–121.
- Offermann, Lynn R., James R. Bailey, Nicholas L. Vasilopoulos, Craig Seal, and Mary Sass. "The relative contribution of emotional competence and cognitive ability to individual and team performance." Human performance 17, no. 2 (2004): 219–243. doi:10.1207/s15327043hup1702_5
- Seal, Craig R., Richard E. Boyatzis, and James R. Bailey. "Fostering emotional and social intelligence in organizations." Organization Management Journal 3, no. 3 (2006): 190–209. doi:10.1057/omj.2006.19
- Bailey, James R., and Jonathan D. Raelin. "Organizations don’t resist change, people do: Modeling individual reactions to organizational change through loss and terror management." Organization management journal 12, no. 3 (2015): 125–138. doi:10.1080/15416518.2015.1039637
- Aguinis, Herman, N. Sharon Hill, and James R. Bailey. "Best practices in data collection and preparation: Recommendations for reviewers, editors, and authors." Organizational Research Methods 24, no. 4 (2021): 678–693. doi:10.1177/1094428119836485
