= Isuzu Trucks South Africa =

Defunct automobile manufacturer

Isuzu Truck South Africa
- Industry: Automotive manufacturing
- Founded: 2006; 20 years ago
- Defunct: 2017; 9 years ago
- Successor: Isuzu Motors South Africa
- Headquarters: Sandton, Gauteng, South Africa
- Key people: Billy Tom (CEO and Managing Director)
- Parent: Isuzu (100%)

Isuzu Truck South Africa was a commercial automobile manufacturer headquartered in Sandton, South Africa. The company was co-owned by Japanese automotive company Isuzu and since-defunct automaker General Motors South Africa (GMSA).

In 2017, US automotive company General Motors announced it was leaving South Africa. Isuzu Motors acquired GMSA's shareholding in Isuzu Truck South Africa. In January 2018, Isuzu Motors South Africa was established as a wholly owned subsidiary of Isuzu Motors, bringing the brand's commercial and passenger vehicle manufacturing in South Africa into one company, headquartered in Gqeberha, in the Eastern Cape.

== History ==
Isuzu Trucks South Africa was founded in November 2006 with a total investment of 80 million Rand as a joint venture between Isuzu of Japan and General Motors South Africa, with both investors owning 50%.

Isuzu Motors Ltd. of Japan increased its share of Isuzu Trucks South Africa to 70% by buying a 20% stake from GM South Africa in 2013.

In 2017, General Motors South Africa announced it was closing, and that Isuzu would buy the remaining 30% of the shares of Isuzu Trucks South Africa, merge them with other assets of GM South Africa which Isuzu would also purchase, and ultimately form Isuzu Motors South Africa.

In January 2018, Isuzu Motors established a new South African subsidiary, Isuzu Motors South Africa, which merged the commercial and passenger vehicle manufacturing into one company in SA. The new firm was based in Gqeberha, Eastern Cape, alongside the manufacturing facility.

== Operations ==
Isuzu Trucks South Africa only handled manufacture, sales, and support of Isuzu commercial trucks (N-Series & F-Series). Isuzu KB pickups were handled by GM South Africa in addition to its Chevrolet and Opel models.

Production capacity is 5,000 units per year of commercial trucks and 23,000 units per year of pickups.

The plant site covered an area of 16,602 square meters in the General Motors Kempston Road plant in Gqeberha, as well as other 790 square meters at its headquarters in Sandton. There were also exports to Malawi, Mauritius, Mozambique, Zambia and Zimbabwe.

== Models ==
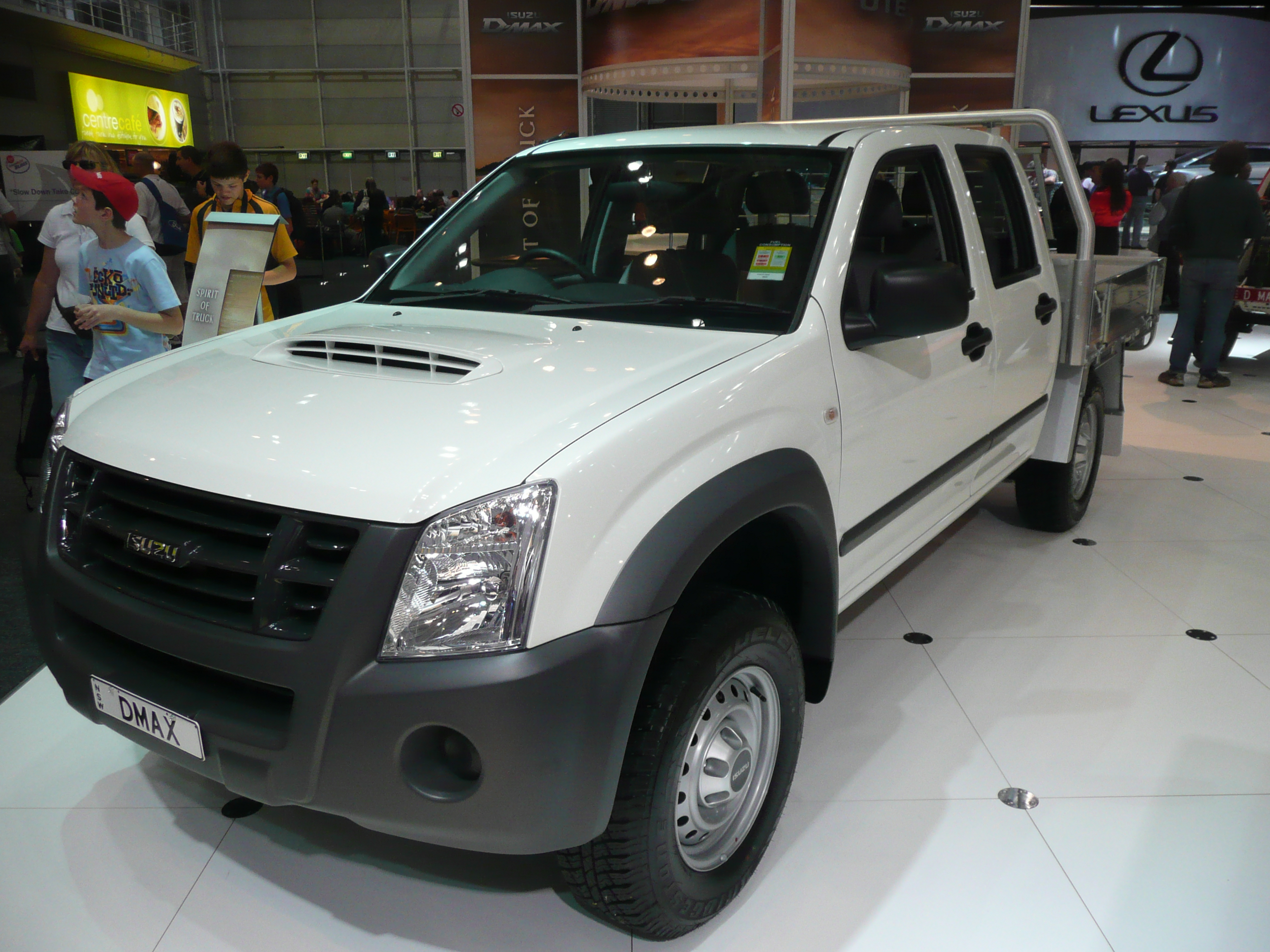
Isuzu KB 2008 model
