= Extreme North (disambiguation) =

Extreme North may refer to:

- Far North (Russia)
- Far North Region (Cameroon), also known as the Extreme North Region (from French: Région de l'Extrême-Nord)
- "Extreme North", a degree of nordicity, suggested by Louis-Edmond Hamelin for Canada
- Extremes on earth § Northernmost

== See also ==
- Far North (disambiguation)
- Farthest North
- Lists of extreme points
