= Norte =

Norte may refer to:

== Places ==
- Norte, Cape Verde, a village in the east-northeastern part of the island of Boa Vista
- Norte de Mexico, a region of Mexico
- Norte Region, Brazil, a region of Brazil
- Norte Region, Portugal, a NUTSII Region of Portugal

== Other ==
- Norte (wind), strong cold northeasterly wind which blows in Mexico along the shores of the Gulf of Mexico
- Norteños, a coalition of traditionally Latino gangs in Northern California
- Norte, the End of History, 2013 Filipino drama film
- Telenorte (TV channel), a Nicaraguan television channel
- Telenorte, a defunct Chilean television station
- Emissores do Norte Reunidos, a defunct Portuguese radio station

== See also ==
- El Norte (disambiguation)
- North (disambiguation) (norte is Portuguese, Spanish and Galician for north)
- Nord (disambiguation), French, Italian, Danish and Catalan for north
