= Daniel Nord =

Daniel Nord, born 1968, is a former Deputy Director of Stockholm International Peace Research Institute (SIPRI). He currently works for the National Inspectorate of Strategic Products which handles non-proliferation and export control issues. He has an international law background with extensive experience on non-proliferation and disarmament affairs, international humanitarian law and human rights.

== Professional life ==
Nord served as SIPRI's Deputy Director from 2005–2012 and was succeeded in the role by Jakob Hallgren. Before joining SIPRI, Nord worked in the Secretariat for the Weapons of Mass Destruction Commission (WMDC). He has also worked at the Swedish Ministry for Foreign Affairs on disarmament and non-proliferation issues, at the Swedish National Defence College as a lecturer in international law and human rights and as a Legal Adviser with the Swedish Red Cross. He has a Master of Laws from Uppsala University.
