= Sigma Motor Corporation =

South African automotive manufacturer

The Sigma Motor Corporation was a South African motor vehicle assembler and distributor. It operated under the Sigma name until 1985 and was based in Silverton, Pretoria. Among the vehicles sold were various models of Mazda, Mitsubishi, Peugeot and Citroën.

== History ==
The Silverton Assembly Plant was originally built in 1961 for Chrysler, and assembled Chrysler Valiants. Chrysler sold its 25% shareholding in January 1983 with the remaining shares being held by Anglo American. Earlier, Leyland had approached Sigma about using one of its engines for the Rover V8. In 1978, there were proposals for Sigma to merge with British Leyland's South African subsidiary in 1979, to form a company called "Sigma Leyland", in which Sigma would have 51 per cent of shares and British Leyland 49 per cent. However, the deal fell through almost immediately. This left Leyland South Africa without a dealer network.

Peugeot and Citroën South Africa (PACSA) was taken over by Sigma in early 1979 and French car production was moved from the former PACSA plant in Natalspruit near Alberton to their "Sigma Park" plant east of Pretoria. Sigma's Mazda and Peugeot light commercials were briefly assembled by Sigma Leyland at Blackheath, Cape Town.

== Products ==
Sigma made great efforts to develop local models, not sold elsewhere in the world. In their first three years, they developed three such models: the Mitsubishi-engined Mazda 323 GLC 1.6, the luxurious Chrysler L-series, and the 2.6-litre Colt Galant. Sigma also sometimes had to choose between Mitsubishi and Mazda products, since the market was limited and local content laws made small production runs uneconomical. For instance, the second generation Mazda Capella was never offered in South Africa, as Sigma chose to build the Colt Galant instead.

It is unclear what models were actually assembled at the Silverton Assembly Plant. Some models may have been imported rather than locally assembled. In 1982, models listed for sale were:

Model	Local Price (ZAR)
Mazda 323 1.3/1.5/1.5 AT/S/SL/SLX	R7,220 - R9,450
Mazda RX-7 (probably imported)	R27,000
Mitsubishi Colt 1600/2000/2000 AT/2600/2600 AT	R8,795 - R11,995
Peugeot 305 Sedan/GR/ST	R8,600 - R9,630
Peugeot 504 GR/GR SW/Super 7	R8,910 - R11,030
Peugeot 505 SR/SR AT/STI/STI AT	R11,875 - R15,700
Citroën CX2400 Prestige (probably imported)	R38,000
Mazda B-Series 1600/2000	R6,595 - R8,050
Mazda trucks T2000 petrol /T3000 diesel	R10,450 - R13,050
Mitsubishi Canter L300 van/minibus	R10,115 - R11,355
Peugeot trucks Canter SWB/LWB	R12,550 - R13,150

By January 1984, Mazda 626 and Mitsubishi Tredia models had been added to the line-up, together with additional variants of the 323, L300 and B-Series (B2200). The Canter trucks were then badged as Mitsubishi rather than Peugeot.

In May 1984, the Mitsubishi Starion EX was added at R31,995.

== Successor ==
In 1984, after undergoing losses over the past two years, Sigma was restructured into a new company known as Amcar. The following year, it was merged with Ford South Africa to create the South African Motor Corporation (Pty) Ltd., known as Samcor for short. In 1988, Ford Canada divested its equity interest in Samcor and donated most of it to the Samcor Employees' Trust. However, Samcor continued to build Ford as well as Mazda and Mitsubishi products. In 1993, with sanctions being lifted in anticipation of the end of apartheid, Ford Motor Company acquired a 45 per cent stake in Samcor. In 2000, it completed a buyout of Samcor shares and renamed the company Ford Motor Company of Southern Africa (FMCSA). As of 2015, FMCSA still operates from the same site in Silverton.

== Slogan ==
The slogan "Quality First" was used in advertising.

== See also ==
Samcor
