= Academy of Management Learning and Education =

Academy of Management Learning & Education
- Discipline: Management
- Language: English
- Edited by: Paul Hibbert

Publication details
- History: 2002–present
- Publisher: Academy of Management (United States)
- Frequency: Quarterly
- Impact factor: 4.8 (2022)

Standard abbreviations
- ISO 4: Acad. Manag. Learn. Educ.

Indexing
- ISSN: 1537-260X (print); 1944-9585 (web)
- JSTOR: acadmanaleareduc
- OCLC no.: 54659710

Links
- Journal homepage; Online access

Academy of Management Learning and Education is an academic journal sponsored by the Academy of Management. It covers management-related teaching, learning, and the management of business education. According to the Journal Citation Reports, the journal had a 2022 impact factor of 4.8.

== Editors ==
The founding editor-in-chief was Roy Lewicki (Ohio State University). The following editor was James R. Bailey (George Washington University). J. Ben Arbaugh (University of Wisconsin Oshkosh) was the third editor. Kenneth G. Brown (University of Iowa, Tippie College of Business) finished his term in December 2014. The fifth editor was Christine Quinn Trank (Vanderbilt University). She finished her term in December 2017. The current editor is William M. Foster (University of Alberta). Current editor-in-chief is Paul Hibbert (University of St Andrews).

== Controversy ==
The journal generated a great deal of controversy by publishing several articles by scholars like Jeffery Pfeffer, Henry Mintzberg, and Sumantra Ghoshal, that were critical of the efficacy of MBA education. Other controversial publications include a critique of journal rankings and a critique of self-assessments as an assessment for learning.
