= Isuzu Motors South Africa =

South African automotive manufacturer

- Type: Subsidiary
- Industry: Automotive
- Founded: 2006; 20 years ago
- Headquarters: Gqeberha, Eastern Cape, South Africa
- Area served: South Africa
- Key people: Billy Tom (CEO)
- Products: Pickup trucks Semi trucks Buses
- Production output: 31,200 vehicles (2026)
- Services: After sales vehicle services
- Number of employees: 1,217 (2026)
- Parent: Isuzu Motors
- Website: www.isuzu.co.za

Isuzu Motors South Africa is a South African automotive manufacturer. The company produces a variety of pickup trucks, trucks, and buses, and had a 2026 production total of over 31,000 vehicles. The company is based in Gqeberha, Eastern Cape, and is a wholly owned subsidiary of Japanese automaker Isuzu Motors.

== History ==
=== Isuzu Trucks South Africa ===
Japanese automaker Isuzu Motors first entered South Africa in 1964.

In 1971, US manufacturer General Motors purchased a 34% shareholding in Isuzu Motors, and thereafter, brought Isuzu models to SA through its wholly owned General Motors South Africa (GMSA) subsidiary.

In 1973, the Isuzu KB pickup entered the South African market badged as the Chevrolet LUV, in line with GMSA's branding. The LUV was subsequently assembled locally at GMSA's Kempston Road plant. In 1978, the pickup was rebranded as the Isuzu KB, with local production continuing in Port Elizabeth.

Isuzu Truck South Africa was established in November 2006, as a joint venture between Japan automaker Isuzu Motors and General Motors South Africa (GMSA), a subsidiary of US-based GM. Each company initially held a 50% shareholding in Isuzu Truck SA.

The company was established to take over the marketing and sales of Isuzu commercial vehicles in South Africa and neighboring countries. GMSA continued to operate the Isuzu pickup truck business in South Africa.

In 2013, Isuzu Motors increased its shareholding in Isuzu Truck SA from 50% to 70%, by acquiring a 20% stake from GMSA.

In 2017, General Motors announced its complete withdrawal from the South African market. Isuzu Motors agreed to acquire GMSA's remaining 30% shareholding in Isuzu Truck SA, as well as the Struandale plant in Gqeberha, Eastern Cape, and other assets associated with General Motors' light commercial vehicle business. Isuzu planned to combine its commercial vehicle and pickup truck operations into a single South African company, called Isuzu Motors South Africa (IMSA).

=== Establishment of Isuzu Motors South Africa ===
Isuzu Motors South Africa (IMSA) was established on 1 January 2018, as a wholly owned subsidiary of Isuzu Motors. The new company became Isuzu's first manufacturing and distribution organization outside Japan to be wholly owned by the company.

IMSA established its headquarters and continued production of Isuzu vehicles at the existing Struandale manufacturing plant in Gqeberha.

In 2018, Isuzu began consolidating its truck and pickup manufacturing operations at Struandale. Truck production was relocated from the former Kempston Road plant in Gqeberha, where the final truck was produced on 30 November 2018. Regular truck production at Struandale began in January 2019, bringing truck and pickup manufacturing together at a single facility.

=== Recent developments ===
In May 2026, IMSA announced it had achieved its highest ever annual production. In the financial year ended March 2026, the plant produced more than 27,400 D-Max bakkies and 3,800 trucks, representing a 21% increase in combined production volumes year-over-year.

== Operations ==
Isuzu Motors South Africa operates a manufacturing plant in Struandale, Gqeberha, producing the D-Max and medium-, heavy-, and extra-heavy trucks for the South African and export markets.

The company exports vehicles to markets across Sub-Saharan Africa. Its D-Max range includes models specifically produced for export markets, while the Gqeberha plant manufactures commercial vehicles for both domestic and African markets. Key export markets have included Kenya, Zimbabwe, Zambia, Mozambique, Mauritius, Senegal, Ghana, and Ivory Coast.

== Models ==
As of 2026, Isuzu SA produces the following models:

| Model | Type | Production | Notes | Ref. |
|---|---|---|---|---|
| D-Max | Pickup truck | Gqeberha, Eastern Cape | Seventh-generation D-Max; available in single-cab, extended-cab, and double-cab configurations | |
| N-Series | Medium-duty truck | Gqeberha, Eastern Cape | Chassis-cab trucks; 19 models in the South African range | |
| F-Series | Heavy-duty truck | Gqeberha, Eastern Cape | Chassis-cab trucks; 19 models in the South African range | |
| FX-Series | Extra-heavy truck | Gqeberha, Eastern Cape | Chassis-cab trucks; 18 models in the South African range | |
