= Delta Motor Corporation =

South African car manufacturer

Delta Motor Corporation was a South African car manufacturer, which was created through a management buy-out after General Motors (GM) divested from South Africa in 1986. It was headed by former GM executive, Bob Price, who had returned to South Africa from Detroit. He had previously served as General Motors South Africa's managing director between 1971 and 1974, and later became president of Motors Trading Corp., a subsidiary that engages in international trade on behalf of GM.

Delta continued to use the Opel, Isuzu and Suzuki brands under licence from GM as well as pay for the supply of assembly kits. Delta also exported small numbers of cars to neighboring, right-hand drive markets. Delta Motor Corporation introduced a number of efficiencies and performed considerably better than GM ZA had been able to do.

Following the transition to universal suffrage in the 1990s, GM acquired a 49 percent stake in the company in 1997 and in 2004 the company once again became a wholly owned subsidiary of General Motors, reverting to its original name, General Motors South Africa. GM ZA also assembled vehicles for export to other right hand drive markets in the region, such as Zimbabwe, Zambia, Mozambique, Malawi, Kenya, and Mauritius.

== See also ==
- Samcor
