= Air North (disambiguation) =

Air North is a Canadian airline.

Air North may also refer to:

- Airnorth, an Australian airline
- Brockway Air, earlier known as Air North, a defunct airline in the northeastern United States
- Fort Yukon Air Service, later known as Air North, a defunct airline in the US state of Alaska
