= Far North =

Far North may refer to:

== Places ==
- Far North (Russia), a part of Russia which lies beyond the Arctic Circle
- Far North Alaska, United States
- Far North (Canada)
- Norte Grande, one of the five natural regions of Chile according to CORFO
- Far North District, the administrative district in northern Northland Region, New Zealand
- Far North Region (Cameroon), Cameroon
- Far North (South Australia), a region
- Far North Queensland, Australia
- Far North (New Zealand electorate), a former New Zealand Parliamentary electorate
- Vhembe District Municipality in South Africa, also known as Far North
- Greenland

== Other uses ==
- Far North (1988 film), a film starring Patricia Arquette
- Far North (2007 film), a movie by Asif Kapadia starring Michelle Yeoh and Sean Bean
- Far North (novel), a 2009 novel by author Marcel Theroux
- Ultima Thule, the term given to unknown northern lands in ancient European geography
- Far North (TV series), a comedy drama crime caper television series

== See also ==
- Extreme North (disambiguation)
- Farthest North
