= Société Automobiles Ménara =

Company

- Founded: 1972; 54 years ago
- Founder: Gilbert Guzzo
- Headquarters: Aïn Sebaâ, Casablanca, Morocco
- Brands: CANAM
- Website: automobiles-menara.com

The Société Automobiles Ménara is a Moroccan automobile manufacturer and was founded in 1972 under the brand name CANAM. The company is located in Aïn Sebaâ, Casablanca.

== History ==
=== The CANAM years (1972-1993) ===
CANAM was founded by the electrician Gilbert Guzzo who had persuaded the former CEO of Texaco to build him a service station and a garage to serve the local Moroccan market. Besides the sale of fuels the company had built caravans and trailer under his CANAM brand name. Later they had manufactured speed boats and amusement rides. Another activity was also the real estate business with new buildings and the construction of special machines.

=== The Ménara era (since 1993) ===
In 1993, the company stopped the production of their obsolete products and changed their name into Société Automobiles Ménara. They began to build unique vehicles, especially replicas. The first product was a replica of the 1913 Peugeot Bébé. The command to do this came from the estate of his Majesty King Hassan II. For this project they moved to a company area with larger premises. So they decided to move to a vacant factory site near their former location. Currently, the company's building covers an area of 10,000 square meters. The Bébé replica got the official model name CANAM Ménara. Next replicas of the manufacturer were a 1912 Buick Model 35, a 1908 De Dion-Bouton Landaulet, a 1917 Buick 45 Touring and a 1928 Citroën 5CV Trèfle. The units are all 1:1 copies.

Ménara is active as a restorer of old passenger cars too. Henceforth, they got orders from the Moroccan royal family to restore an old Ford Model C and a 1934 Chrysler CB.

In 2001 they have found an idea to assemble an own vehicle model like in the heyday of CANAM. A year later, Ménara had launched their retro-styled Ménara WSC 2002 roadster. The vehicle is built in Handicraft and includes all equipment ordered by the customer. The WSC 2002 is a two-seater model which is especially popular for ambassadors. The WSC 2002 is available with a 4-cylinder gasoline engine thas is having a capacity of 1998 ccm. It has a power of 88 kW and enables a top speed of 160 km/h. The rotations per minute are at 5,500. All used materials are from Morocco. Currently, the Ménara vehicles are mainly distributed in countries of Northern Africa, with North American showrooms in New York City and Toronto who sell the Ménara model.

Société Automobiles Ménara participates in racing as well. The company provides own racing teams for various car manufacturers like Ferrari, Fiat, Kia Motors and Maserati. The manufacturer is also organizing their own racing events under the Automobiles Ménara Compétition guise, while also being active as a general importer for those particular brands. Currently, about 100 workers are employed by Société Automobiles Ménara.
