= Walter R. Nord =

American organizational behavior scholar

- Born: July 2, 1939 (age 87)
- Occupation: Academic
- Known for: Contribution to the development of organisational studies

Academic background
- Education: Washington University; Cornell University; Williams College

Academic work
- Discipline: Psychology, management theory
- Sub-discipline: Organizational behaviour
- Institutions: Washington University; University of South Florida

Walter R. Nord (born 1939) is an American academic specializing in the study of organizational behavior. He has co-authored books on power in organizations and managing organizations.

Nord has published numerous scholarly articles in well respected journals such as the Journal of Management, the Journal of Marketing and the Psychological Bulletin. He is currently the Professor of Organisational Behaviour at the University of South Florida. Nord has worked for this organisation since 1989.

== Early life ==
Nord received a B.A. major in economics from Williams College in 1961. Nord then went on to receive an M.S. in organizational behaviour from Cornell University in 1963. He received his Ph.D. in social psychology from Washington University in St. Louis in 1967.

== Career ==
Nord started his career as an assistant professor of organizational psychology at Washington University from 1967. He was promoted to professor of organizational psychology in 1974 and continued to be employed by Washington University until 1989.

In 1989, Nord became the professor of organizational behaviour in the College of Business for the University of South Florida.
