= Samcor =

Ford Motor Company of Southern Africa

South African Motor Corporation (Samcor)
- Type: Subsidiary
- Industry: Automotive
- Founded: 1985
- Founder: Ford of Canada; Sigma Motor Corporation
- Defunct: 2000; 26 years ago
- Successor: Ford of Southern Africa
- Headquarters: South Africa
- Parent: Ford Motor Co.

The South African Motor Corporation, more commonly known as Samcor, was a South African car manufacturer created in 1985 through the merger of Ford Motor Company of Canada's South African subsidiary and Sigma Motor Corporation (previously known as Amcar), which produced Mazdas for the local market.

As a result of the merger, Ford and Mazda began to share models in South Africa, as they already did in other markets like Australia. For example, in 1986, the European-sourced Ford Escort was replaced by the Laser and Meteor based on the Mazda 323 hatchback and sedan respectively and manufactured locally from 1986 up to the Ford Escort's re-introduction in 1995. Similarly, in 1993, the Ford Sierra hatch and Sapphire sedan were replaced by the Ford Telstar (1993-1998), based on the Mazda 626. However, this badge engineering proved unpopular with many South African buyers and came to an end in 1998 when the Mondeo replaced the Telstar in this market.

In 1988, Ford divested from South Africa and sold its 42 per cent stake in Samcor, although it would continue to sell Ford-branded automobile components for assembly and sale in the country.

In addition to Ford and Mazda products, Samcor also assembled Mitsubishi commercial vehicles, with the Mitsubishi L300 minibus being badged as the Ford Husky.

In 1994, Ford (USA) bought a 45 per cent stake in Samcor, and in 1998, bought the remaining share, renaming the company FMCSA Ford Motor Company of Southern Africa in 2000.

In 2015 FMCSA, now under complete Ford (USA) ownership, closed all of the Port Elizabeth assembly plants and transferred all of their South African manufacturing activities to the Silverton, Pretoria assembly plant.

== Background ==
Ford South Africa was based in Port Elizabeth (now part of the Eastern Cape province) and had been operating since 1923. In the early 1980s, it had both a vehicle assembly plant and an engine plant in Struandale, together with an older assembly plant in Neave. After the merger with Sigma and the formation of Samcor, the engine plant continued to be operated by Samcor and in 2015 was still operating under Ford ownership. Both the assembly plants were closed and all vehicle production transferred to Samcor's Silverton Assembly Plant in Pretoria. The Struandale assembly and engine plants were subsequently sold to Delta Motor Corporation (now General Motors).

In 1984, after undergoing losses over the past two years, Sigma was restructured into a new company known as Amcar. The following year, it was merged with Ford South Africa to create the South African Motor Corporation (Pty) Ltd., known as Samcor for short. In 1988, Ford Canada divested its equity interest in Samcor and donated most of it to the Samcor Employees' Trust. However, Samcor continued to build Ford as well as Mazda and Mitsubishi products.

== Silverton Assembly Plant ==
The Silverton Assembly Plant (25°43′21″S 28°20′06″E) is located on Simon Vermooten Road, in an industrial area on the outskirts of Silverton. It is approximately 15 km (9 miles) east of Church Square, the centre of Pretoria. The township of Mamelodi is nearby, and many of Samcor's labour force came from there.

On the main site is the assembly plant itself and two office administration buildings. Adjacent is the Parts & Accessories warehouse which includes the Customer Service offices. Samcor also used to have a separate design studio and Service Training facilities, both in nearby Silvertondale. Both were closed in the 1990s.

Originally built in 1961 for Chrysler, early models assembled at Silverton included the Chrysler Valiant and the Peugeot 504. As of 2015, the assembly plant is still operating under Ford ownership. It now assembles only the Ford Ranger pick-up and, in smaller numbers, the Ford Everest.

== Exports ==
Although Samcor's exports were mainly confined to Southern Africa, from 1991 to 1993, it exported the South African version of the Mazda 323 to the UK, as the Sao Penza. However, just over 1,000 were sold and as of July 2025 just one remains, albeit in an unroadworthy state, rumoured to be in a barn in West Sussex owned by a private collector.

Namibia, formerly South African-administered South West Africa, was considered by Samcor to be part of the domestic dealership network.

The European-market Ford Ranger has been supplied from South Africa since its introduction, due to a trade agreement between South Africa and the European Union which grants a lower import duty for vehicles made in South Africa.

== Logo ==
The Samcor corporate logo was oval-shaped, similar to the Ford logo. Initially, both monochrome and colour versions were used. The colour version consisted of three horizontal bands of orange, white and blue with "SAMCOR" on the middle band. These were the main colours used on the old pre-1994 South African national flag. After the introduction of the new national flag, the colour logo was dropped and only the monochrome version used.

The logos were mainly used on internal documentation and business cards. Vehicles were not badged as Samcor, but the Samcor logo and name was used on Vehicle Identification (VIN) plates.

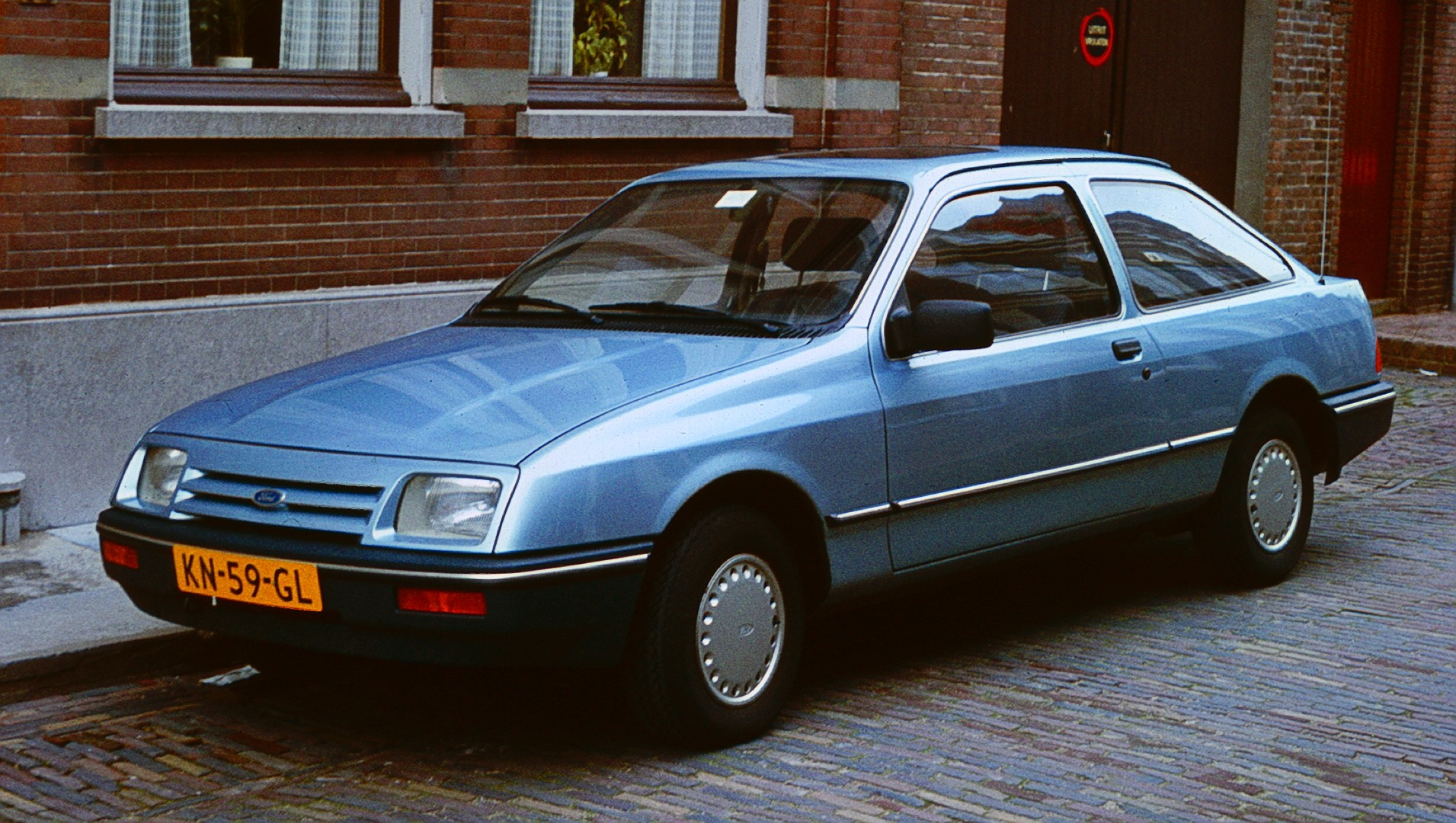
Ford Sierra
1983–1993

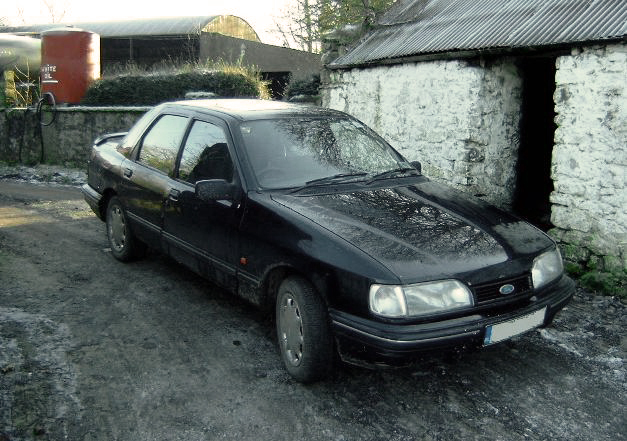
Ford Sapphire
1990–1993

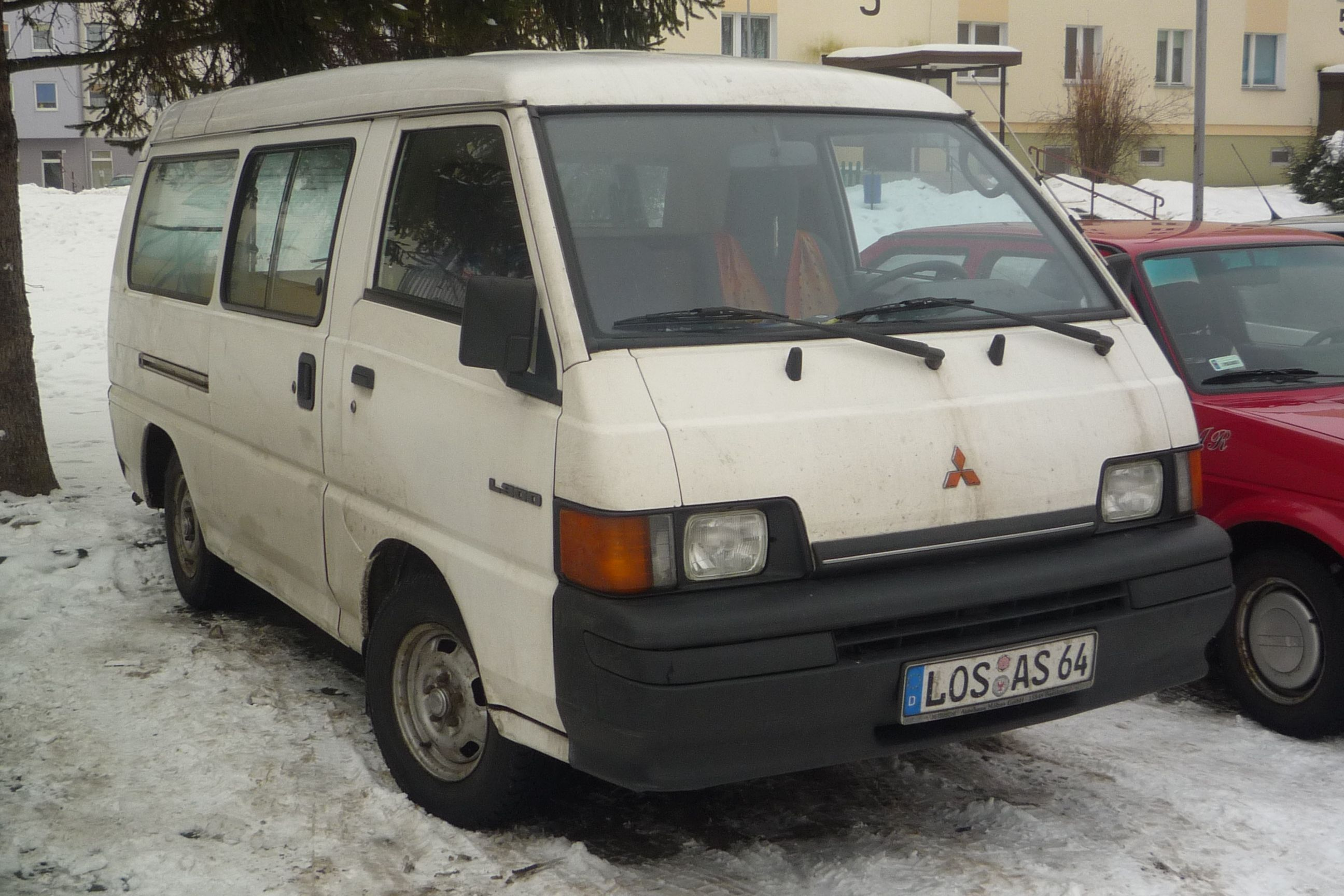
Ford Husky (based on Mitsubishi L300)
1985–1991

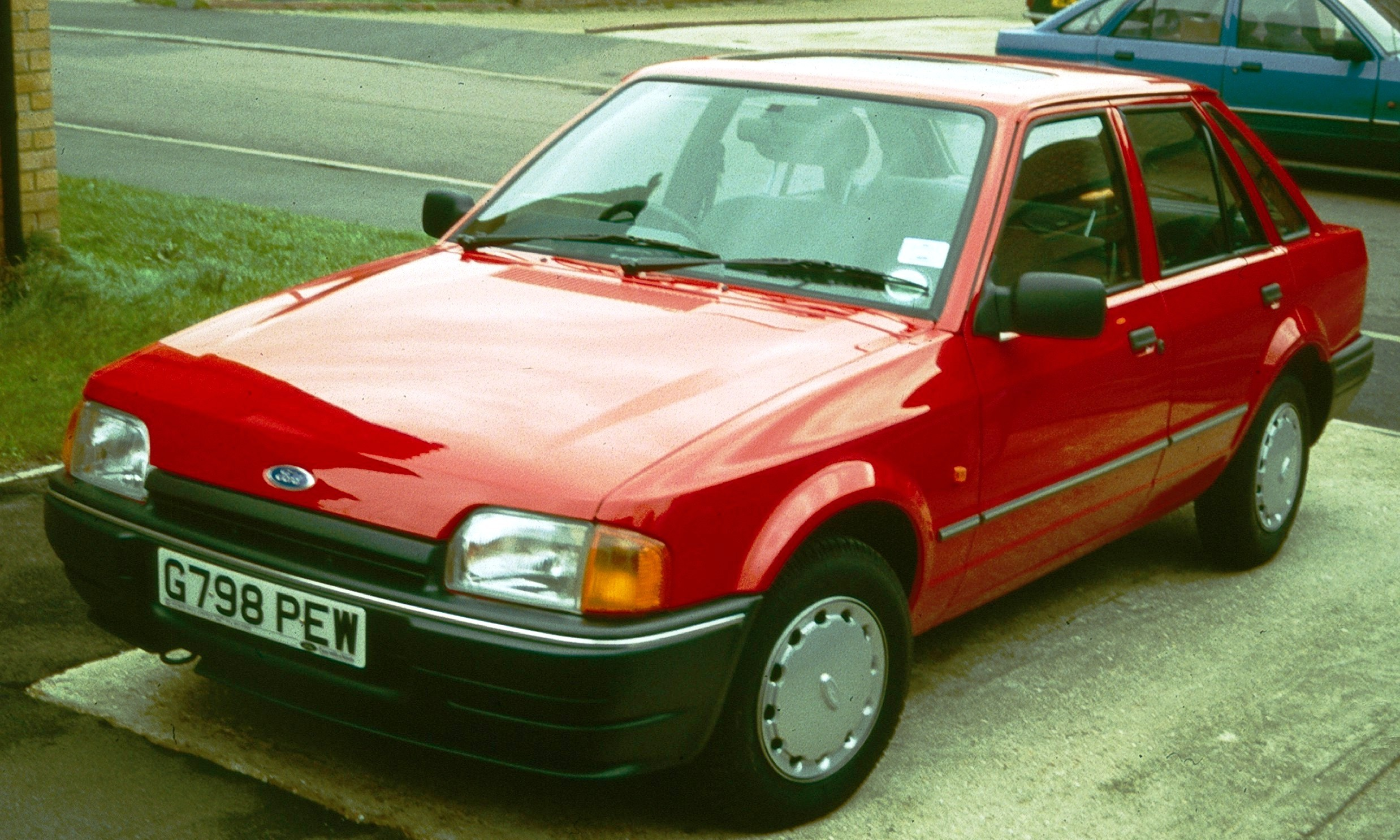
Ford Escort
1981–1986

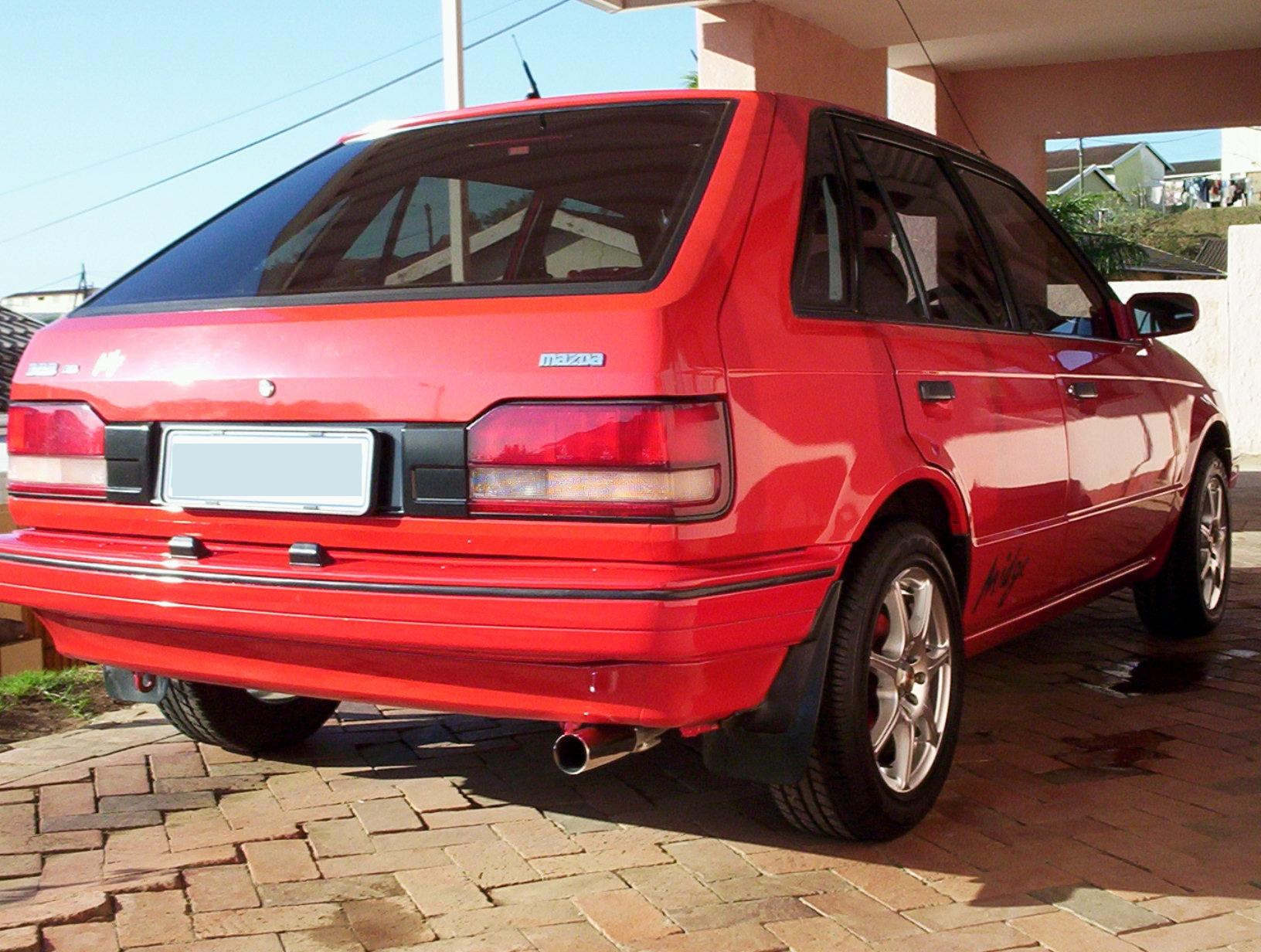
Ford Tonic / Mazda 323
1986–2003

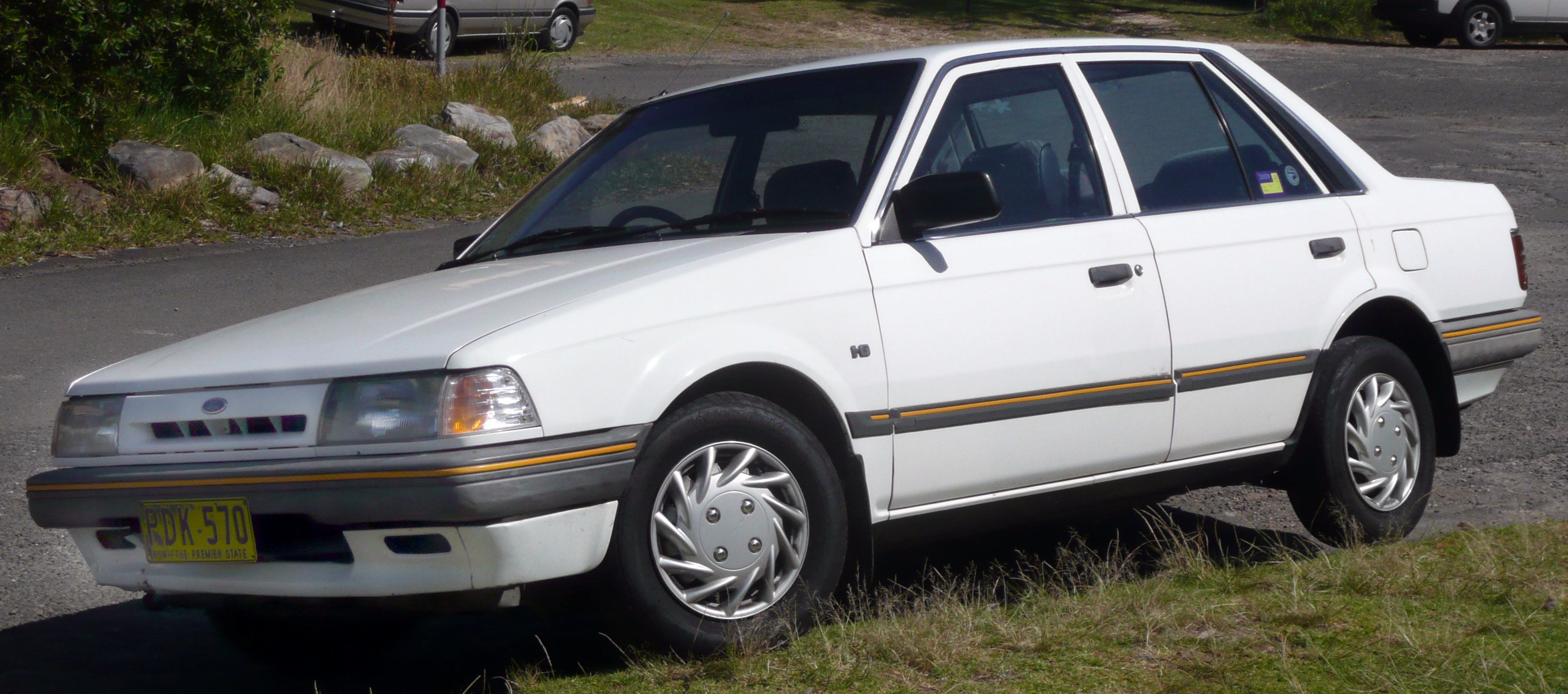
Ford Meteor
1986–1998

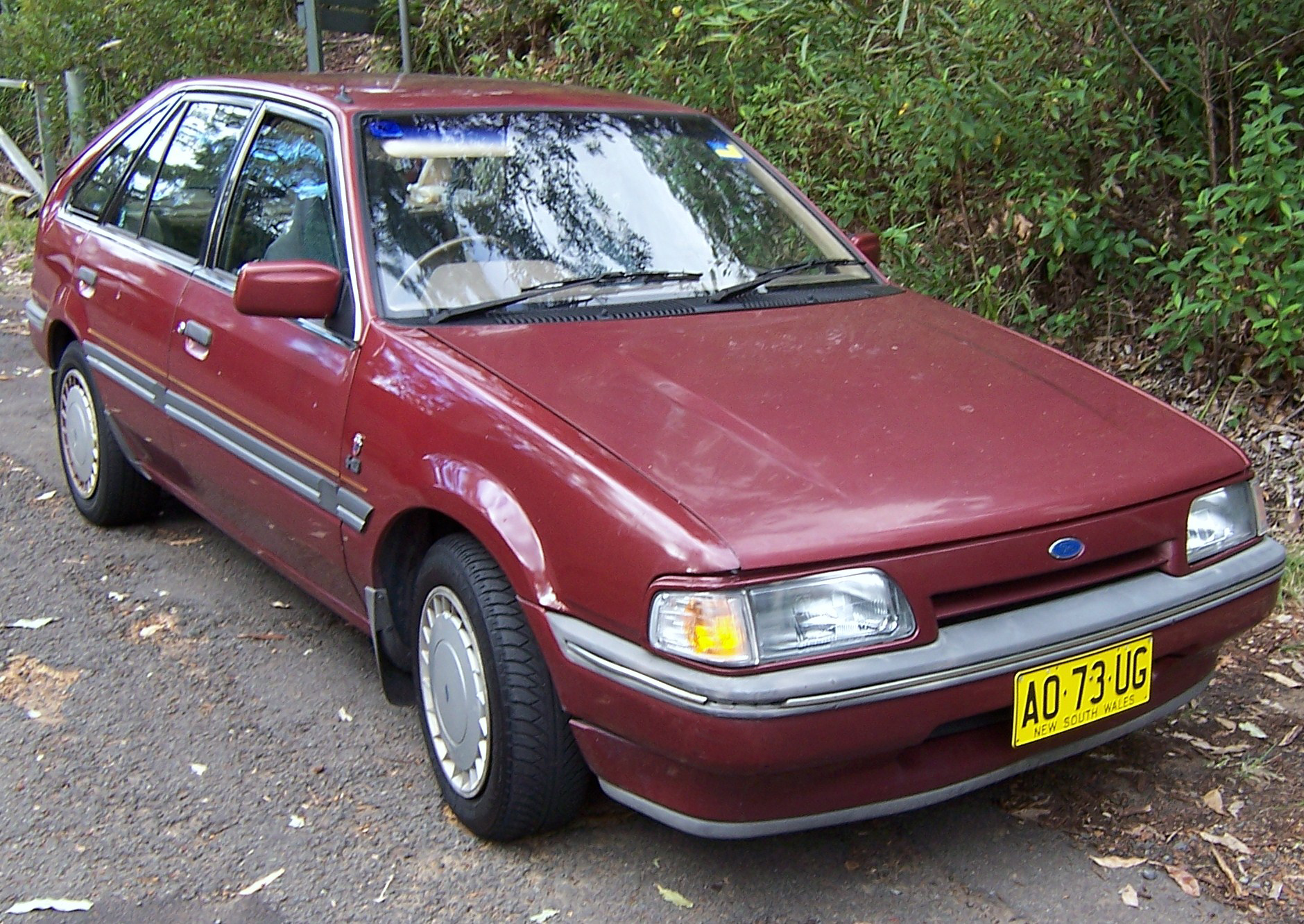
Ford Laser
1986–1998

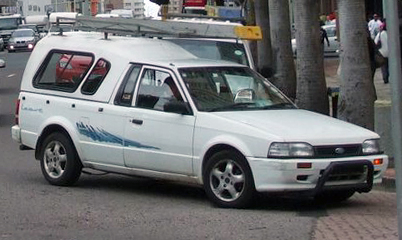
Ford Bantam 2 / Mazda Rustler
1987–2002

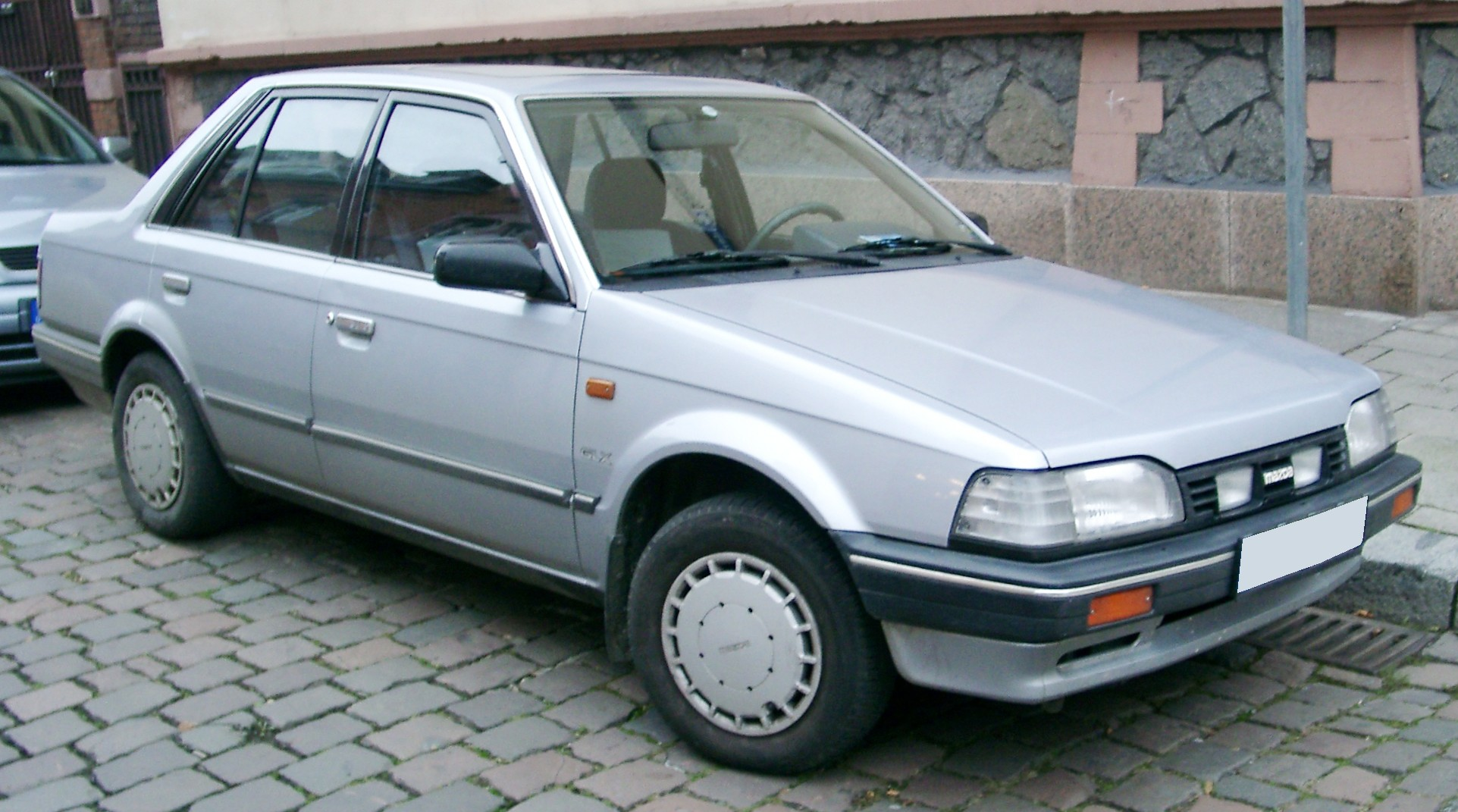
Mazda 323
1986–1995

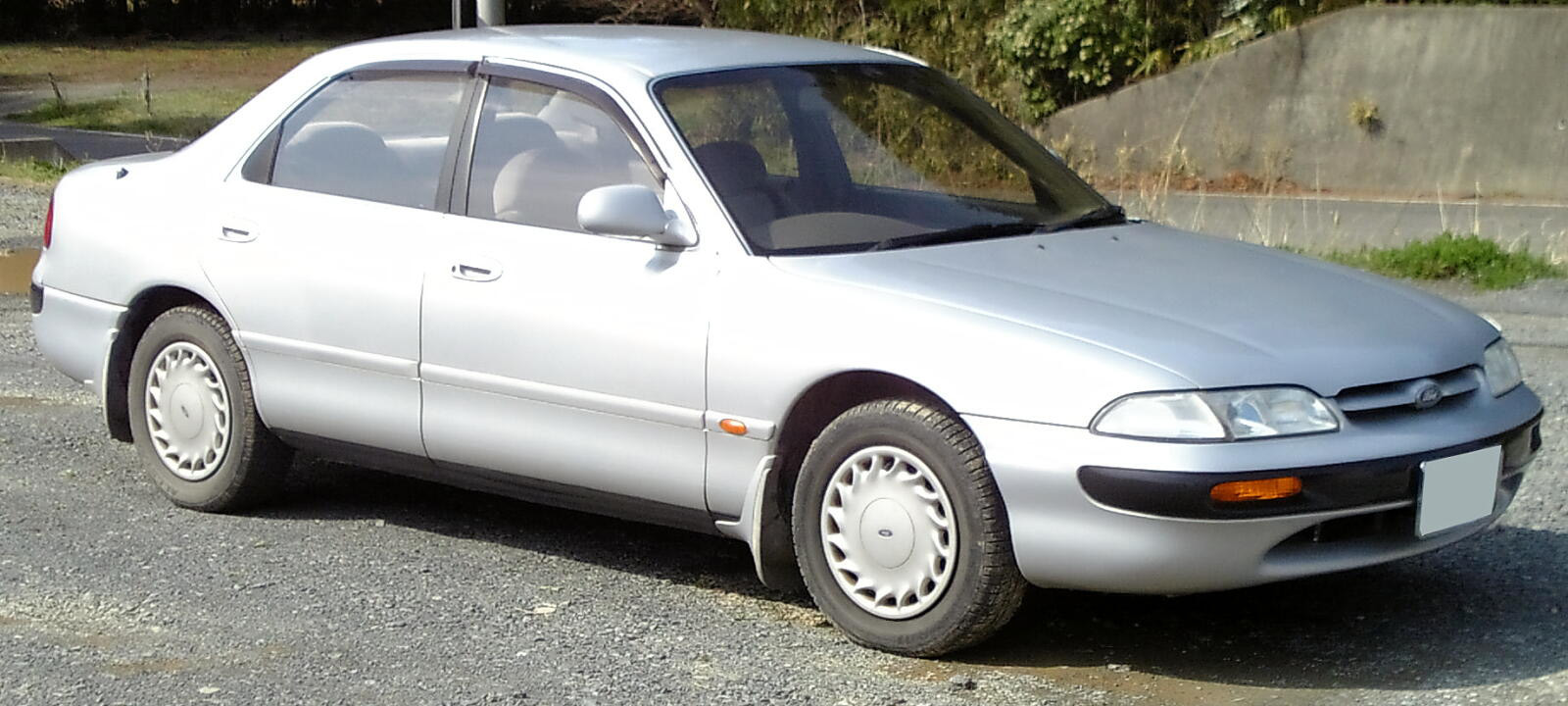
Ford Telstar
1993–1998

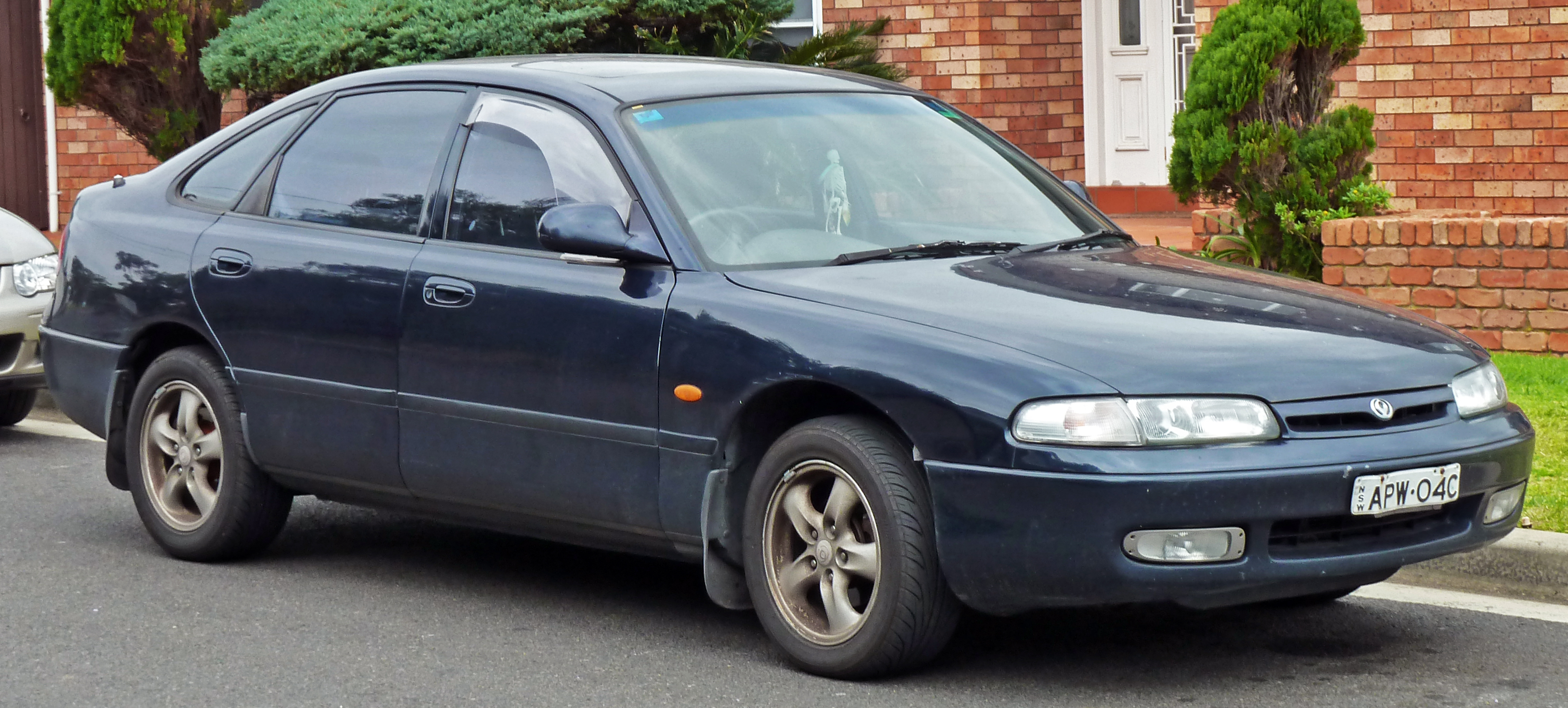
Mazda 626
1993–1998

== See also ==
- Delta Motor Corporation
