= Ford Motor Company of Southern Africa =

South African automotive manufacturer

- Type: Subsidiary
- Industry: Automotive manufacturing
- Founded: 1923; 103 years ago
- Headquarters: Pretoria, Gauteng South Africa
- Products: Passenger vehicles Commercial vehicles
- Parent: Ford Motor Company
- Website: ford.co.za

Ford Southern Africa, officially Ford Motor Company of Southern Africa Pty Ltd, is a South African automotive manufacturer with its headquarters in Pretoria, Gauteng.

The company is a wholly owned subsidiary of US automotive group Ford Motor Company. As of 2024, Ford had the fourth-largest market share in South Africa with about 10% of the market.

== History ==
The company was founded in 1923. A year later, the first Model Ts were assembled in Port Elizabeth. This made Ford the first automobile manufacturer in South Africa.

The assembly plant in Silverton near Pretoria was opened in 1967 (according to other sources 1968).

Together with Sigma Motor Corporation, which at that time belonged to Anglo American plc and produced Mazda models for the local market, Ford founded the South African Motor Corporation (Samcor) in 1985. In 1988, Ford withdrew from South Africa for economic and political reasons.

Samcor produced car and commercial vehicle models of the Ford and Mazda brands as well as the South African version of the Mazda 323 as Sao Penza.

A source confirms the sale of the Mazda 323 under the Sao Penza brand name in the UK between 1991 and 1992.

With the renewed takeover of Samcor shares (45%) in 1994 Ford returned to South Africa.

In 2000 Ford took over the majority of the Samcor shares, which became the Ford Motor Company of Southern Africa. Since 2014, the Mazda brand has again been distributed via its own dealer network.

The Ford Ranger is currently produced in Silverton. In addition, the FMCSA has an engine factory opened in Struandale near Port Elizabeth in 1964. The units manufactured there are exported to 148 countries.

== Models ==
From 1971 to 1987, the Ford Cortina Pick-up (from 1982: Ford P100) was manufactured in South Africa. It was based on the respective Cortina model and was exported to Europe from 1982.

After the merger with Samcor, Ford began to badge-engineer its European models - Ford Escort and Ford Sierra - with Mazda-based Ford Laser / Ford Meteor and Ford Telstar. The Ford Husky was based on the Mitsubishi L300.

The model Sierra XR8 achieved international fame, of which a total of 250 vehicles were produced between 1984 and 1988. The vehicle, which can be recognized externally by the air inlets on the bonnet, made around 209 hp with a displacement of 5 liters.
