= North (surname) =

North is a surname.

The name in English origin is a topographic or toponymic surname. It denotes someone who had migrated from the north, resided to the north of a location, or was from northern England but living in the southern part of the country.

The surname North in Ireland is an Anglicization of McNulty or Mac an Ultaigh. In Irish, this means 'son of the Ulsterman', Ulster being the northern province of Ireland. It is associated with families that migrated westward to Donegal which became known as Ultach and some of their descendants assumed the name, Mac an Ultaigh.

Notable people with the surname include:

== A ==
- Aaron North (born 1979), American guitarist
- Alan North (1920–2000), American actor
- Alan North (motorcyclist) (born 1953), South African motorcyclist
- Alex North (1910–1991), American composer
- Alfred North (disambiguation)
- Andy North (born 1950), American golfer and television commentator
- Anita North (born 1963), British clay-pigeon shooter
- Anthony North, Australian judge
- Astrid North (1973–2019), German soul singer
- Austin North (born 1996), American actor

== B ==
- Barry North (born 1959), Royal Air Force officer
- Bill North (born 1948), American former Major League Baseball player
- Brad North (born 1985), American soccer player
- Brady North (born 1991), American baseball coach
- Brownlow North (1741–1820), British bishop
- Brownlow North (evangelist) (1810–1875), British evangelist

== C ==
- Chandra North (born 1973), American model
- Charles North (disambiguation)
- Christopher North (disambiguation)

== D ==
- Dakota North (speedway rider) (born 1991), Australian motorcycle speedway rider
- Danny North (born 1987), British football player
- David North (disambiguation)
- Delia North, South African statistician
- Douglas M. North, American academic administrator
- Douglass North (1920−2015), American economist
- Dudley North (disambiguation)

== E ==
- Edmund H. North (1911–1990), American screenwriter
- Edward North, 1st Baron North (c. 1496–1564), English nobleman
- Eustace North (1868–1925), England international rugby player

== F ==
- F. J. North (1889–1968), British geologist and museum curator
- Ford North (1830–1913), British judge
- Frances North (1919–2003), American politician
- Francis North (disambiguation)
- Frank North (1840–1885), United States Army officer and politician
- Frank North (American football) (1924–2017), American football coach
- Frank William North (1871–1925), Anglican clergyman who spent his career in Russia and Finland
- Freddie North (born 1939), American singer
- Frederic North (1866–1921), British sportsman and public servant
- Frederick North, Lord North (1732–1792), British prime minister
- Freya North (born 1967), British writer

== G ==
- Gary North (disambiguation)
- George North (born 1992), Welsh rugby player
- George North (disambiguation)
- Gerald North (born 1938), American climatologist

== H ==
- Harold North
- Heather North (1945–2017), American actress
- Henry North (disambiguation)

== I ==
- Ian North (1952–2021), American musician, producer and painter

== J ==
- J. J. North (born 1964), American actress
- Jade North (born 1982), Australian football player
- Jay North (1951–2025), American actor and voice actor
- Jessica Nelson North (1891–1988), American writer
- Jim North (1919–2003), American football player
- Joe North (1895–1955), British footballer
- John North (disambiguation)
- Johnny North (1921–2010), American football player and coach
- Jordan North (born 1990), English radio and television presenter

== K ==
- Kathryn North, Australian paediatric physician, neurologist and clinical geneticist
- Kenda North (born 1951), American photographer

== L ==
- Larry North, American serial bomber in 2010
- Lawrence North (1903–1980), New Zealand Baptist minister
- Lindsay North (1911–1984), Australian politician
- Lowell North (1929–2019), American sailor

== M ==
- Marianne North (1830–1890), English botanical artist
- Marcus North (born 1979), Australian cricketer
- Michael North (professor), American literary critic
- Mike North (born 1951), American sports talk radio show host
- Mikey North (born 1986), British actor
- Moira North, American figure skating choreographer

== N ==
- Nathaniel North (c. 1671–1716), pirate born in Bermuda
- Ned North, pen name used by Edwin North McClellan
- Neil North (1932–2007), British actor
- Nigel North (born 1954), English lutenist
- Nolan North (born 1970), American voice actor

== O ==
- Oliver North (born 1943), American former lieutenant colonel involved in the Iran–Contra affair
- Oliver Danson North (1887–1968), British automobile designer

== P ==
- Peter North (disambiguation)
- Phil North (born 1965), Welsh cricketer
- Philip North (born 1966), British priest

== R ==
- Richard North (disambiguation)
- Rob North, American politician
- Robert North (disambiguation)
- Robyn North (born 1983), British actress
- Roger North (disambiguation)
- Roy North (born 1941), British actor
- Russ North (1965–2025), British singer
- Ryan North (born 1980), Canadian writer

== S ==
- S. N. D. North, American statistician
- Sam North (born 1960), English author
- Sheree North (1932–2005), American dancer and actress
- Stacey North (born 1964), British football player
- Stephen North (born 1965), British actor
- Sterling North (1906–1974), American children's writer

== T ==
- Thomas North (1535–1604), English translator

== W ==
- Walter E. North, American diplomat
- Walter H. North (1933–2014), American politician
- Walter Harper North (1871–1952), American jurist
- William North (disambiguation)

== Fictional characters ==
- David North (character), a Marvel Comics character
- Gary North (Emmerdale), on the British soap opera Emmerdale

== See also ==
- North (given name)
