= Ice Theatre of New York =

The Ice Theatre of New York
- Address: 62 Chelsea Piers #308, New York, NY, United States; New York; USA

Construction
- Opened: 1984

Website
- https://www.icetheatre.org

The Ice Theatre of New York is an American ensemble company dancing on ice, performing works by choreographers drawn from competitive figure skating and modern and contemporary dance. Aiming to create dance on ice as part of the modern performing arts scene, Ice Theatre of New York (ITNY) was first conceived by Marc Bogaerts, Marjorie Kouns, Cecily Morrow and Moira North. North went on to found ITNY in 1984. Jirina Ribbens has served as Executive Director for 20 years and was one of the founding board members. Based at the Chelsea Piers rink complex in New York City, Ice Theatre of New York was the first not-for-profit professional ice dance company in the U.S. and the first to receive funding from the National Endowment for the Arts, New York State Council on the Arts, and New York City Department of Cultural Affairs.

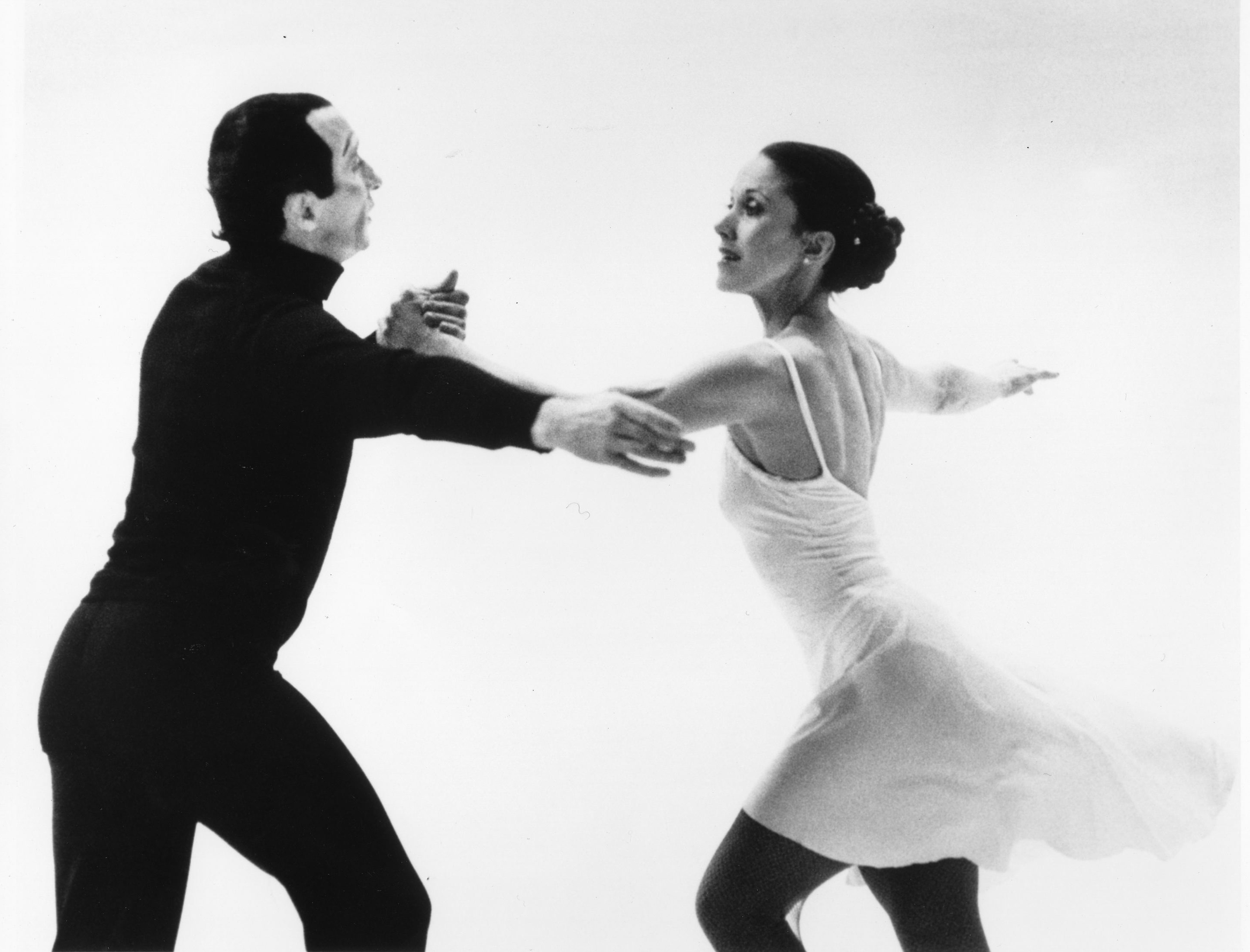
Heaven and Hell, Choreographed by Marc Bogaerts

Ice Theatre of New York has performed works by choreographers Marc Bogaerts, Edward Villella, Jacqulyn Buglisi, Alberto del Saz, Carlos Orta, Twyla Tharp, Jean-Pierre Bonnefoux, Peter Martins, Lar Lubovitch, Elisa Monte, Susan Marshall, Joanna Mendl Shaw, Tommy Steenberg, Frank Nowosad, David Dorfman, Bill Woehrle, Rob McBrien, Nathan Madden, Jim May, Gary Beacom, Peter DiFalco, Charles "Chucky" Klapow, Matthew Nash, Judy Blumberg, Gaiane & Akop Akopian, Lorna Brown, Kolton Krouse and Florentine Houdinière.

The Ice Theatre of New York ensemble consists of 8 to 12 skaters from the NY area. They perform solos, duets and group repertory pieces. The company has created close to 150 repertory pieces to date. Guest artists who performed with the company include Elladj Baldé, Gary Beacom, Surya Bonaly, Kurt Browning, John Curry, Dorothy Hamill, Sarah Hughes, Nancy Kerrigan, Kiira Korpi, Ross Miner, Tatiana Navka & Roman Kostomarov, Evgeni Plushenko, Adam Rippon, Lucinda Ruh, Rohene Ward, Johnny Weir, and Paul Wylie.

Ice Theatre of New York has received private support from the Lisa McGraw Figure Skating Foundation, Bloomberg Philanthropies, the Will Sears Memorial Fund, the Kasputys family, the Eagan Family Foundation, and individuals from the skating community. Performances have been reviewed in major media.

As funds permit, ITNY arranges residencies in other cities where ice rental is less expensive, such as Lake Placid, NY, or Sun Valley, ID, in order to develop new choreography and the dance artistry and athleticism of the ensemble.

In a format developed by Olympic Champion John Curry as a class for his skating company, skaters in the group's weekly Master Edge Class focus on ensemble movement to music. This class functions much like the ballet barre in Ballet.

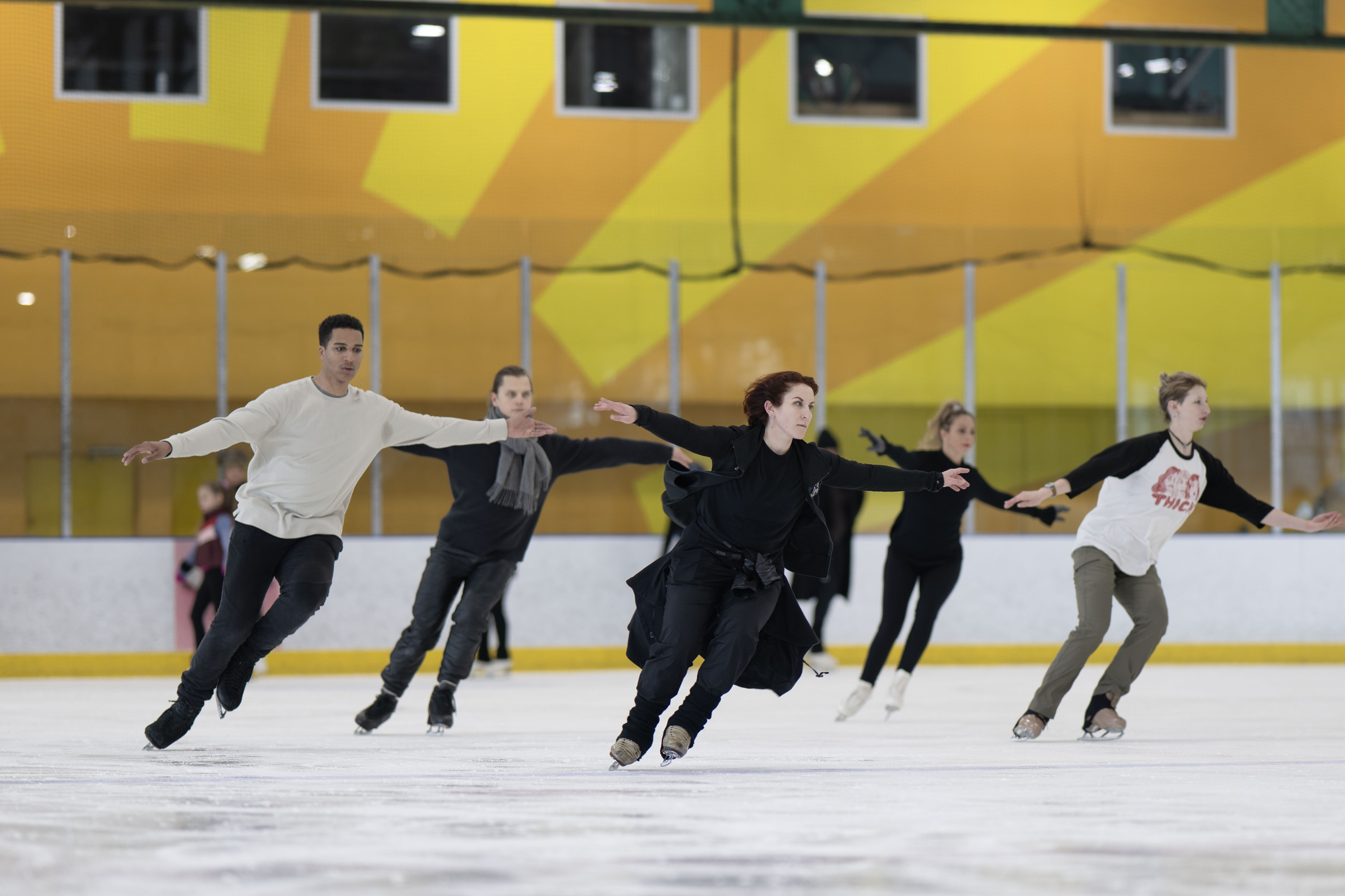
Edge Class at Sky Rink

Ice Theatre of New York's educational outreach extends to New York City public school children, K-12. Their New Works and Young Artists Series gives arts exposure to students from neighborhoods in Upper Manhattan and the outer boroughs. Students view a performance that includes the professional company and several junior skaters followed by a one hour ice skating lesson. Programming takes place at several public rinks around the city, for a total of 10-12 sessions for 2,600-plus students.

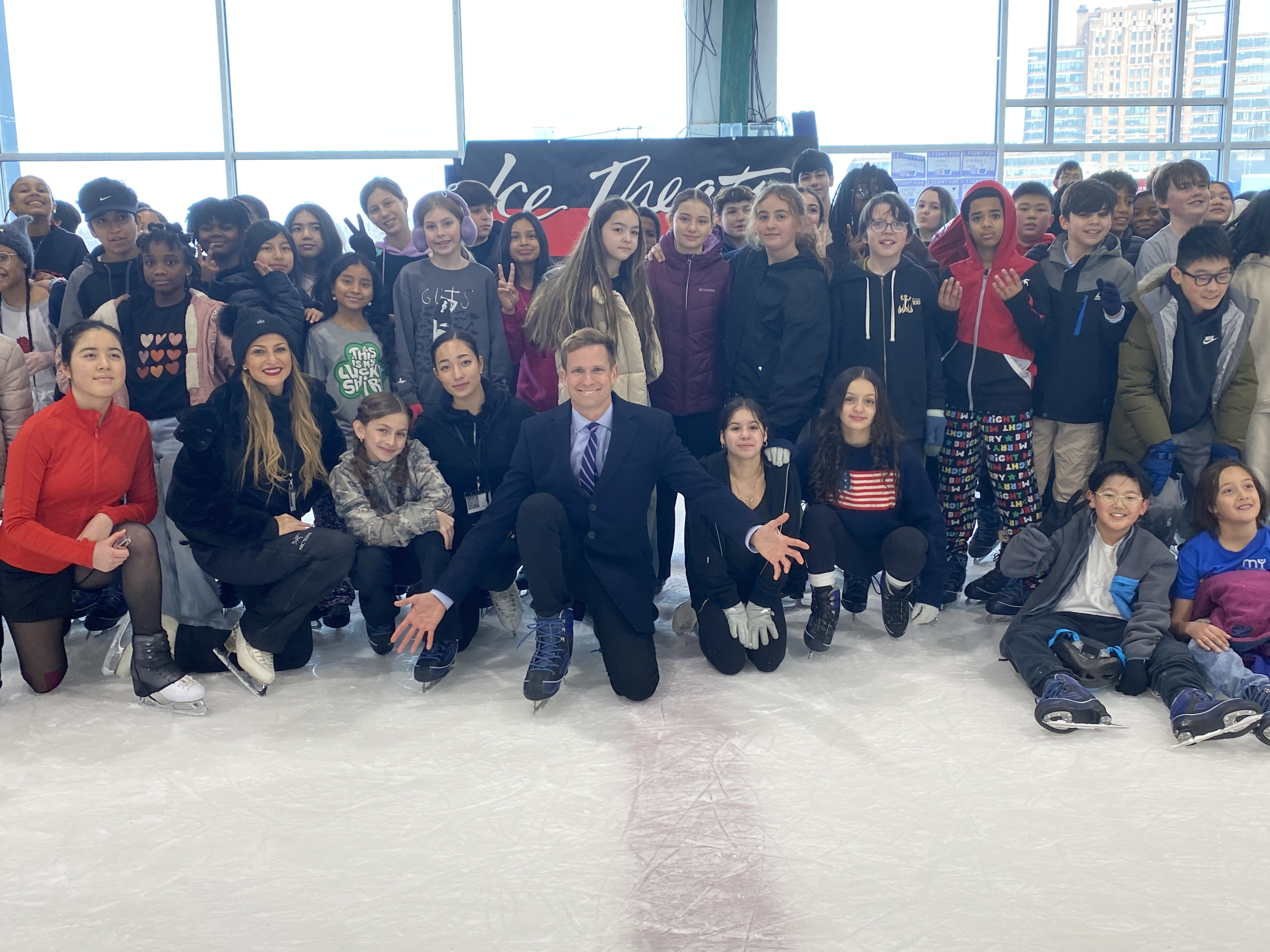
Council Member Erik Bottcher with kids from our New Works and Young Artists Series at Sky Rink, Chelsea Piers
