= Ellinger (disambiguation) =

Ellinger is a rural unincorporated community in Fayette County, Texas, United States. It may also refer to:

== People ==
- Bruno Ellinger (born 1973), Austrian ice dancer
- John Ellinger (born 1951), American soccer coach
- Moritz Ellinger (1830–1907), German-American journalist and city official
- Nina Bang, née Ellinger, (1866–1928), Danish politician
- Rory Ellinger (1941–2014), American politician
- Meatball (wrestler) or Richard Ellinger (born 1970), American professional wrestler

== See also ==
- Ellinger, Texas, an unincorporated community, Texas, United States
- Ellinger Tor, a City gate of Weißenburg, Bayern, Germany
