= Sunset Valley, Texas =

- City
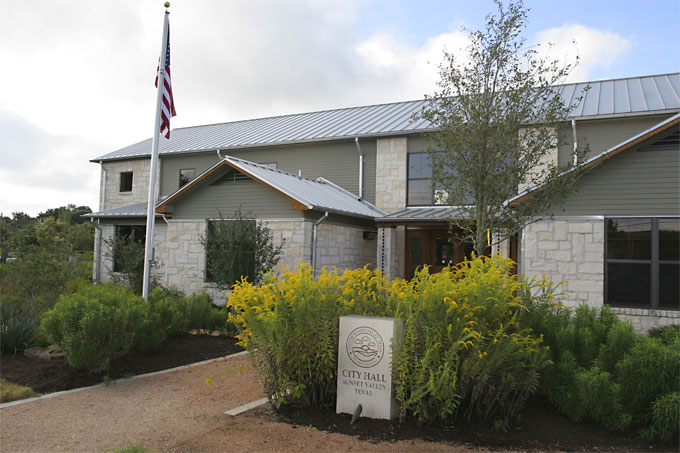
- Sunset Valley City Hall
- Location of Sunset Valley, Texas
- Coordinates: 30°13′32″N 97°48′58″W
- Country: United States
- State: Texas
- County: Travis
- Incorporated: September 13, 1954

Area
  - Total: 1.39 sq mi (3.61 km^{2})
  - Land: 1.39 sq mi (3.61 km^{2})
  - Water: 0 sq mi (0.00 km^{2})
- Elevation: 666 ft (203 m)

Population (2020)
  - Total: 683
  - Density: 490/sq mi (189/km^{2})
- Time zone: UTC-6 (Central (CST))
  - Summer (DST): UTC-5 (CDT)
- ZIP Codes: 78735, 78745
- Area code: 512
- FIPS code: 48-71324
- GNIS feature ID: 1376344
- Website: www.sunsetvalley.gov

Sunset Valley is a city in Travis County, Texas, United States. The population was 683 at the time of the 2020 census. An enclave, it is surrounded on all sides by the city of Austin.

== Geography ==
Sunset Valley is located 5 miles (8 km) southwest of downtown Austin.

According to the United States Census Bureau, the city has a total area of 1.4 square miles (3.6 km^{2}), all land.

== History ==
Mexico's passage of the General Colonization Law in 1825 enabled and encouraged immigration and settlement in unapportioned land. The first recorded land transactions in the Sunset Valley area occurred in 1835, while the region was still under the jurisdiction of the Mexican state of Coahuila y Tejas. The state apportioned 25 labors of land (roughly equivalent to 4,425 acres (1,791 ha)) to Theodore Bissell and granted a similarly sized partition of land to the north to Thomas Anderson that same year. Located south of Austin, the apportioned land lay outside of the jurisdiction of Stephen F. Austin's colony. Sections of the lands held by Bissell and Anderson were sold to and settled by buyers over the course of subsequent decades following the Annexation of Texas. In the early 1950s, brothers M.H. and Clarence Flournoy acquired a large tract of land 12 mi (19 km) away from Austin, including what would become Sunset Valley, to develop a subdivision. The Flournoys also drilled a well that would ultimately serve as the area's first water system. A meeting of local residents led to the filing of a petition in 1954 to hold an election seeking to incorporate what had become known as Sunset Valley. The petition approximated the area to be incorporated as having an area less than 2 mi^{2} (5.2 km^{2}) and a population of over 200. The election was granted, and on September 13, 1954, voters supported incorporation by a 45–6 vote. On September 17, 1954, the Village of Sunset Valley was officially incorporated with Clinton Vilven as its first mayor. In the late 1950s and early 1960s, Sunset Valley was known for the Christmas lights adorning homes along Sunset Trail, attracting visitors from the Austin area. The city also sponsored Texas's largest youth rodeo, which annually drew 250–300 participants and thousands of attendees. The rodeo's proceeds, along with a voluntary tax program, supported Sunset Valley's revenue in its early years.

The growth of nearby Austin – which impinged upon and eventually enveloped Sunset Valley's city limits – led to frequent disputes over territory and jurisdiction. The borders of the newly incorporated Sunset Valley initially spanned from Prather Lane southwestward to Brodie Lane, and from Manchaca Road westward to the modern West Gate Shopping Center. However, in the decade following incorporation, several annexations and de-annexations led to confusion regarding Sunset Valley's borders and further territorial disputes complicated the city's borders. In 1963, the Texas Legislature granted incorporated areas extraterritorial jurisdiction (ETJ), giving municipalities the ability to regulate development in areas beyond their borders; the ETJs of Sunset Valley and nearby Austin overlapped. Additional annexations and de-annexations occurred between 1964–1973. In the 1970s, the Austin Independent School District's (AISD) proposal to build an athletics complex and bus depot on Jones Road – within Sunset Valley's jurisdiction – met opposition from the Sunset Valley community, and the city declined permit issuance for the facility. The resulting legal challenge mounted by the city of Austin culminated in the case AISD v. City of Sunset Valley (1973), in which the Supreme Court of Texas ruled in favor of AISD, leading to the construction of the complex in 1976. Sunset Valley's first city hall was built in 1977. Although informal police protection in Sunset Valley began in 1954, a formal police department was established in 1979. While Sunset Valley began as a residential community, in 1990 the city approved the development of a 60-acre (24 ha) retail center. By 1990, the population had grown to 327. A wastewater system was constructed in the early 1990s with a grant from the Texas Water Development Board. In 1998, Sunset Valley entered into an inter-local agreement with the city of Austin to provide firefighting services. The population rose to 365 by 2000, an 11.6 percent increase over the 1990 figure.

In 2001, the United States Postal Service officially recognized Sunset Valley as a destination for mail delivery. While a vast majority of the city's land remains residential, commercial development has increased in recent years.

== Demographics ==
Historical population
Census	Pop.	Note	%±
1960	179		—
1970	292		63.1%
1980	420		43.8%
1990	327		−22.1%
2000	365		11.6%
2010	749		105.2%
2020	683		−8.8%
U.S. Decennial Census; 2020 Census

=== 2020 census ===
As of the 2020 census, Sunset Valley had a population of 683. The median age was 46.6 years. 22.8% of residents were under the age of 18 and 27.1% of residents were 65 years of age or older. For every 100 females there were 90.3 males, and for every 100 females age 18 and over there were 88.2 males age 18 and over.

100% of residents lived in urban areas.

There were 242 households in Sunset Valley, of which 39.3% had children under the age of 18 living in them. Of all households, 67.4% were married-couple households, 11.2% were households with a male householder and no spouse or partner present, and 17.8% were households with a female householder and no spouse or partner present. About 15.3% of all households were made up of individuals and 9.9% had someone living alone who was 65 years of age or older.

There were 257 housing units, of which 5.8% were vacant. The homeowner vacancy rate was 1.7% and the rental vacancy rate was 5.0%.

Racial composition as of the 2020 census
Race	Number	Percent
White	447	65.4%
Black or African American	9	1.3%
American Indian and Alaska Native	2	0.3%
Asian	66	9.7%
Native Hawaiian and Other Pacific Islander	0	0.0%
Some other race	24	3.5%
Two or more races	135	19.8%
Hispanic or Latino (of any race)	138	20.2%

=== 2000 census ===
As of the 2000 census, there were 365 people, 146 households, and 109 families residing in the city. The population density was 265.0 inhabitants per square mile (102.3/km^{2}). There were 154 housing units at an average density of 111.8 per square mile (43.2/km^{2}). The racial makeup of the city was 92.05% White, 0.27% Native American, 1.37% Asian, 4.66% from other races, and 1.64% from two or more races. Hispanic or Latino of any race were 12.33% of the population.

There were 146 households, out of which 27.4% had children under the age of 18 living with them, 63.0% were married couples living together, 8.2% had a female householder with no husband present, and 24.7% were non-families. 15.1% of all households were made up of individuals, and 9.6% had someone living alone who was 65 years of age or older. The average household size was 2.50 and the average family size was 2.82.

In the city, the population was spread out, with 21.6% under the age of 18, 3.3% from 18 to 24, 24.1% from 25 to 44, 33.7% from 45 to 64, and 17.3% who were 65 years of age or older. The median age was 46 years. For every 100 females, there were 91.1 males. For every 100 females age 18 and over, there were 89.4 males.

The median income for a household in the city was $75,470, and the median income for a family was $78,937. Males had a median income of $52,083 versus $34,375 for females. The per capita income for the city was $28,833. About 7.3% of families and 8.7% of the population were below the poverty line, including 16.7% of those under age 18 and 8.5% of those age 65 or over.

== Government ==
The city council consists of one mayor and five council members, one of which is a mayor pro tem. As of 2022, the mayor was Marc Bruner and the council members were Mayor Pro tem Alfonso Carmona, Rudi Rosengarten, Wanda Reetz, Justin Litchfield, and Robert Johnson.

== Human resources ==
=== Public health ===
Emergency medical services are provided by Austin-Travis-County Emergency Medical Services (ATCEMS). The Austin Fire Department's Fire Station 51 and ATCEMS Station Number 40 house emergency medical personnel that service Sunset Valley and the surrounding communities.

=== Public safety ===
Sunset Valley provides funds and a municipal law enforcement agency. Fire protection is provided by the Austin Fire Department.

=== Police and law enforcement ===
The Sunset Valley Police Department (SVPD) is the primary law enforcement agency of Sunset Valley. and as of 2022, consists of 14 employees, 13 sworn officers and one civilian employee. The department is composed of a police chief, an evidence tech/administrative assistant, a lieutenant, one detective sergeant, two patrol sergeants, and eight patrol officers. There are four patrol officers assigned to each patrol sergeant.

Beginning in the early-1950s, a series of city service development began, culminating in a Police Protection organization in 1954 and a police reserve force in 1978. SVPD was formally created in 1979. The SVPD headquarters are at the Sunset Valley City Hall, located at 3205 Jones Rd, Sunset Valley, TX 78745. As of Fiscal Year 2022, the annual budget was $1.8 million.

On September 12, 2017, Lenn Carter replaced intermin Police Chief Lt. Rich Andreucci as Chief of Police. Prior to joining the SVPD, Lenn Carter served as the deputy police chief for the Denton Police Department. Upon becoming Chief of Police, Lenn Carter's primary goal was stated as fostering a sense of trust between community members and the police department. The Chief of Police position is appointed by a City Council vote.

==== Police services ====
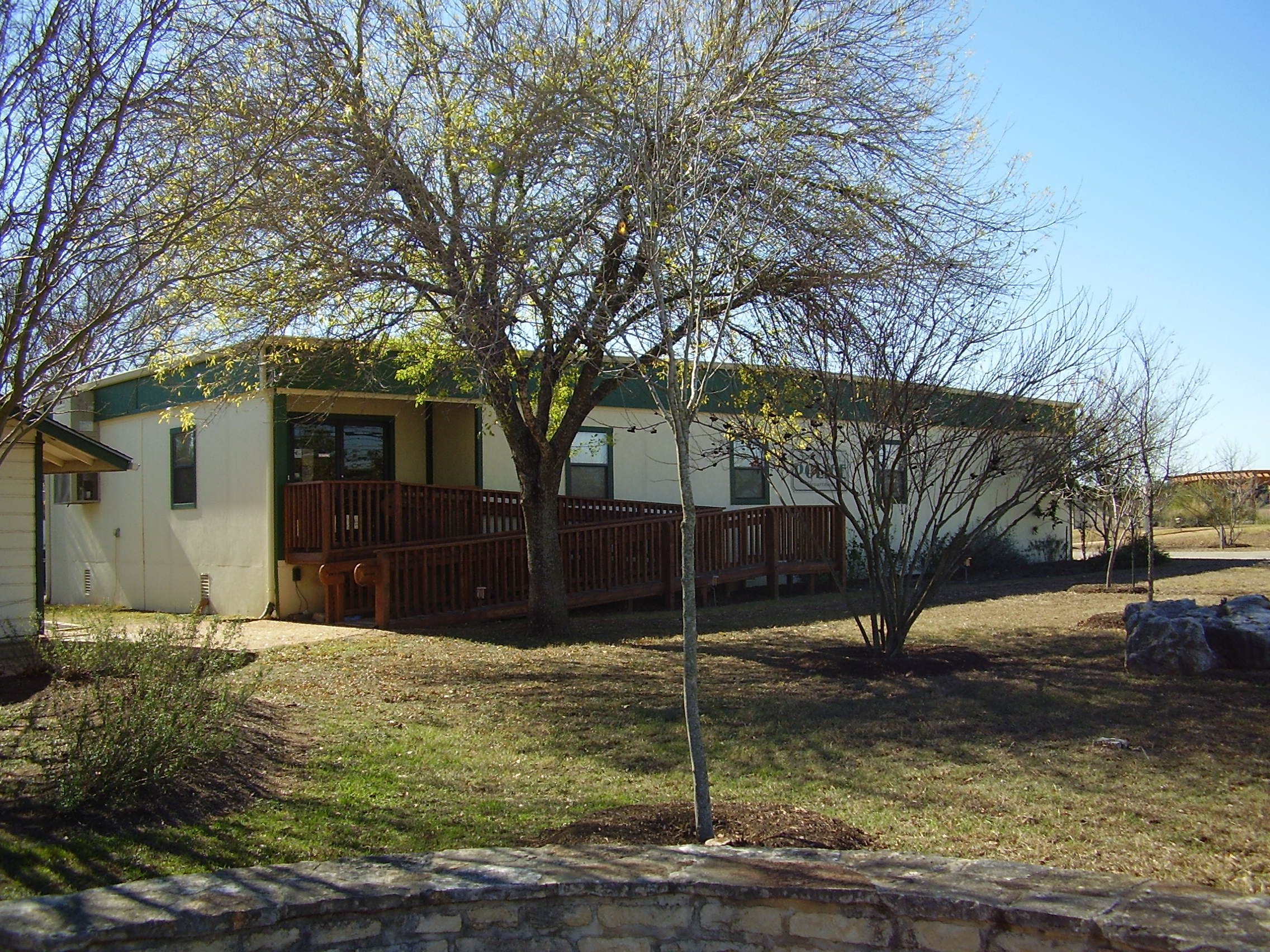
Sunset Valley Police Department

Sunset Valley Police Department provides 24-hour law enforcement services to a retail and residential community surrounded entirely by the City of Austin. SVPD enforces the laws of the State of Texas, as well as the City of Sunset Valley Code of Ordinances. The SVPD has a stated focus of providing shared partnerships within their community. As of Fiscal Year 2022, SVPD's budget includes operations for a National Night Out Against Crime, a Community Partnership program, a Crime Prevention program/Child Safety program, and a Neighborhood Watch program.

==== Notable incidents ====
The Sunset Valley Police Department contributed to the investigation of the Austin serial bombings that occurred between March 2 and March 22, 2018. The suspect, 23-year-old Mark Anthony Conditt, was observed on security footage at a FedEx store within Sunset Valley, where multiple explosive packages had been shipped.

=== Firefighting ===
Firefighting services were historically provided by a volunteer department, but this was dissolved in September 2011. In 2018, a new fire station was proposed to be built within Sunset Valley city limits. However, the decision was made to build the station within Austin city limits and services both communities. The Austin Fire Department (AFD) now services the citizens of Sunset Valley. The new station, Fire Station 51, is located at 5410 Highway 290 and employs both ATCEMS and AFD personnel.

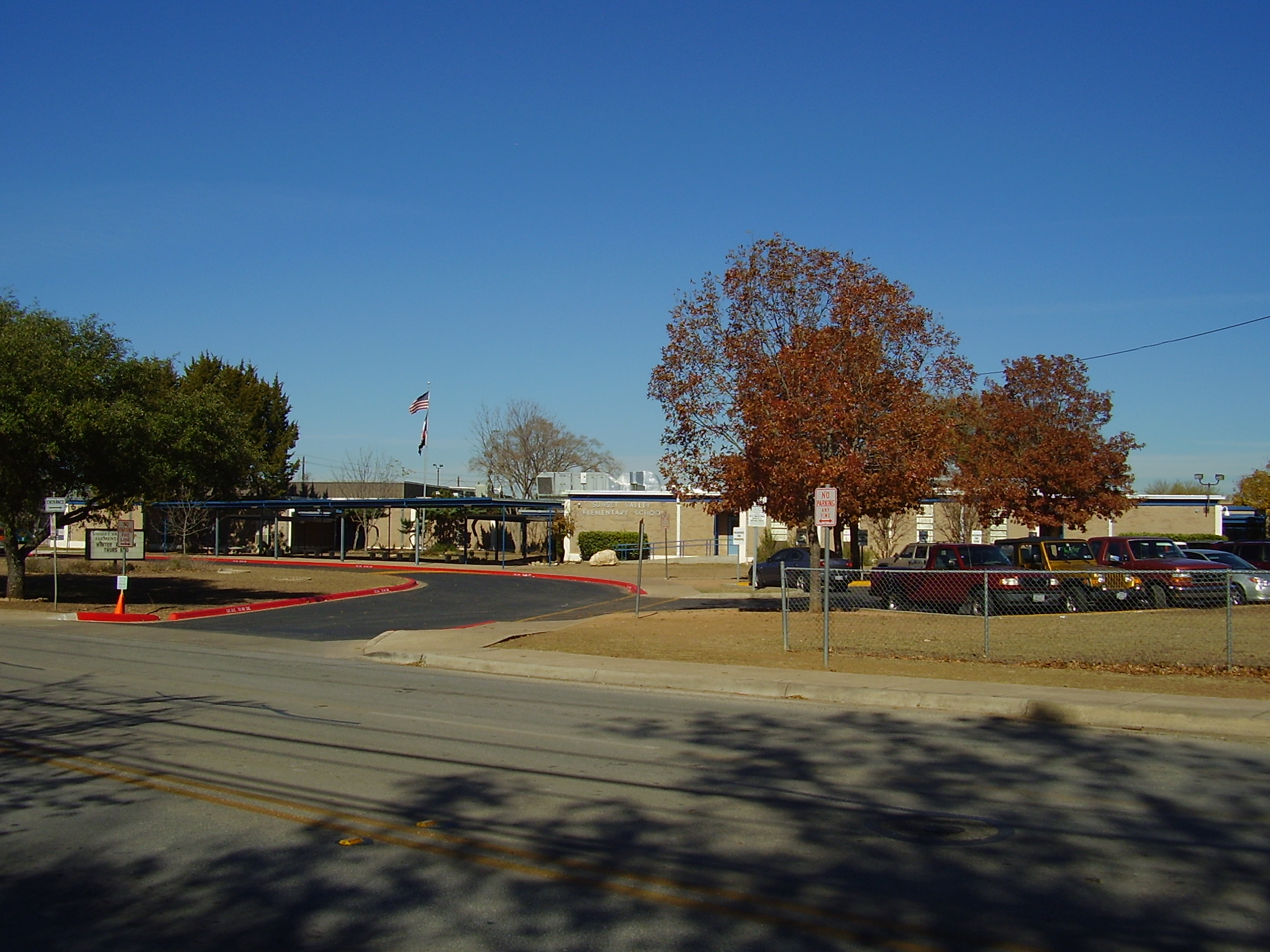
Sunset Valley Elementary School

== Education ==
Sunset Valley is within the Austin Independent School District. The city is zoned to Sunset Valley Elementary School in Sunset Valley, Covington Middle School, and Crockett High School.
