= Moira North =

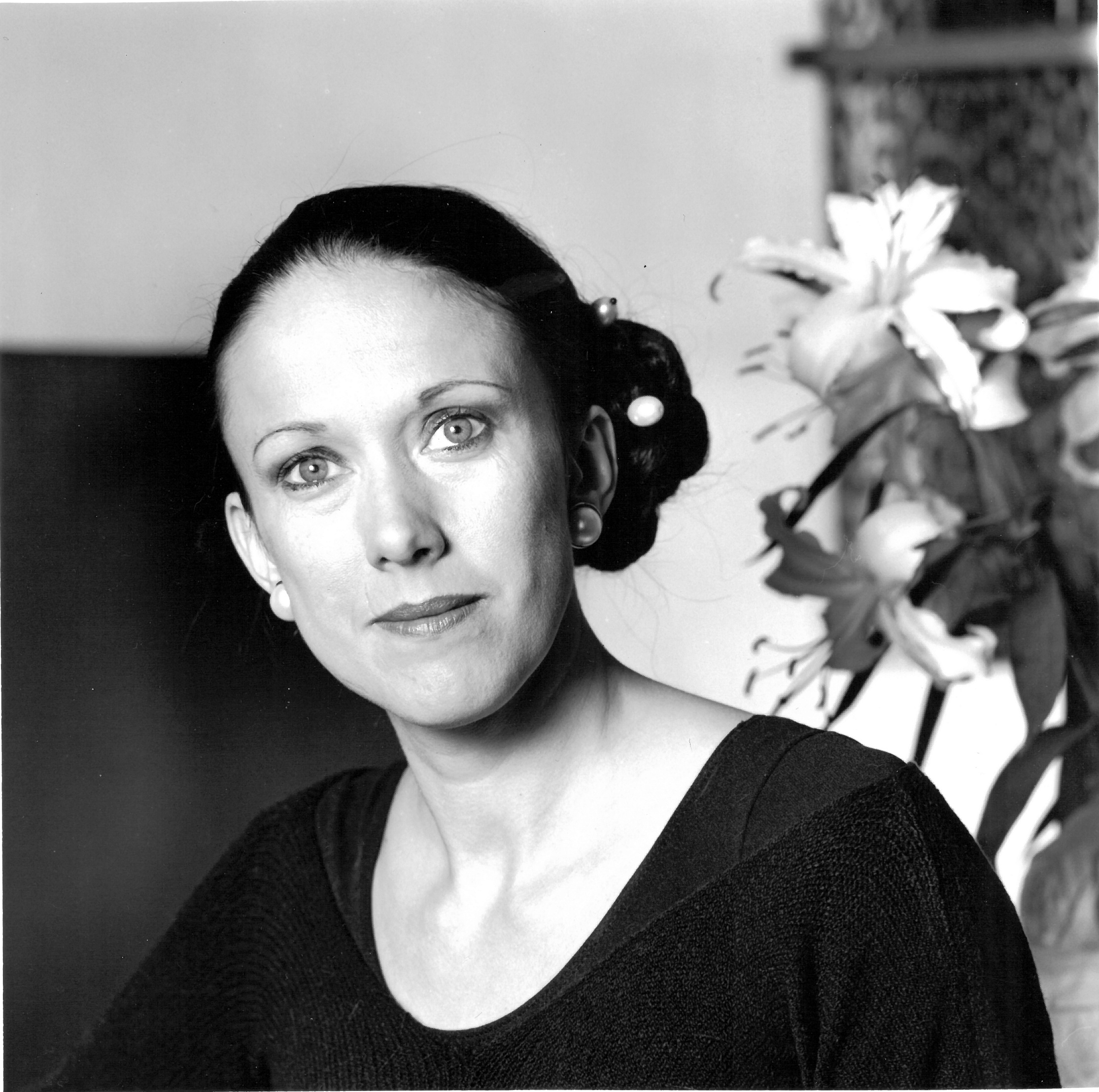
Moira North

Moira North is the founder and artistic director of the Ice Theatre of New York, a theatrical figure skating company. For her work with this organization, in 1998 and 2003 she was selected as one of the "25 Most Influential Names in Figure Skating" by International Figure Skating Magazine. North has choreographed for film and skating productions in addition to her work for Ice Theatre. Her credits include teaching actress Illeana Douglas to skate for her role in the film To Die For, teaching and choreographing a skating scene in the film The Preacher's Wife with Whitney Houston and Denzel Washington, choreographing five productions of Montreal Fashions on Ice for the Québec Delegation at Rockefeller Plaza and choreographing the opening ceremonies for both the National Hockey League All-Star Game and World Cup Hockey. She also served as creative consultant for Arts & Entertainment's Winter Solstice on Ice, a 1999 holiday season television special.

In 1984, North and partner Patrick Dean won the ice dance competition at the World Professional Figure Skating Championships in Jaca, Spain, performing a piece choreographed by Marc Bogaerts that was the Ice Theatre's first work.
