= Richard North =

Richard North may refer to:

- Richard B. North, American medical doctor
- Richard D. North (1946–2025), British conservative commentator
- Richard A. E. North (born 1948), British blogger and author
- Richard North (darts player) (born 1990), English darts player
- Richard Alan North (born 1944), British biomedical scientist
- Richard North Patterson (born 1947), American author
