= John North =

John North may refer to:

Ordered chronologically

== Politicians ==
- John North (City of York MP) (1495–1558), Member of Parliament (MP) for the City of York
- John North (died 1597) (1551–1597), MP for Cambridgeshire, Cambridge and Orford
- John North (Oxfordshire MP) (1802–1894), British politician
- John W. North (1815–1890), U.S. statesman and pioneer
- John B. North (1825–1907), shipbuilder and political figure in Nova Scotia, Canada

== Sportsmen ==
- John North (billiards player), English billiards player, runner-up in the 1892, 1893 and 1899 World Billiards Championship (English billiards)
- Johnny North (1921–2010), original Baltimore Colts player and New Orleans Saints head coach
- John North (cricketer) (born 1970), former English cricketer

== Others ==
- John North (Trinity) (1645–1683), Master of Trinity College, Cambridge
- John Henry North (c. 1788–1831), British politician
- John Gunder North (1826–1872), Norwegian-born ship builder in San Francisco
- John Thomas North (1842–1896), British investor and businessman, known as 'The Nitrate King'
- John William North (1842–1924), English landscape painter and illustrator
- John North (theologian) (1871–1950), New Zealand Baptist minister, editor and theological college principal
- John Dudley North (1893–1968), chairman and managing director of Boulton Paul Aircraft
- John Ringling North (1903–1985), owner of the Ringling Bros. and Barnum & Bailey Circus
- John North (historian) (1934–2008), British historian of science
- John Anthony North (1938–2025), British historian of ancient Rome
