= Francis North =

Francis North may refer to:

- Francis North, 1st Baron Guilford (1637–1685)
- Francis North, 2nd Baron Guilford (1673–1729), British peer
- Francis North, 1st Earl of Guilford (1704–1790), British peer and politician
- Francis North, 4th Earl of Guilford (1761–1817), British peer, army officer, and playwright
- Francis North, 6th Earl of Guilford (1772–1861)
- Francis North (Australian politician) (1811–1864), member of the Queensland Legislative Council

== See also ==
- Frances North (1919–2003), American politician
