= North (given name) =

- The name refers to the cardinal direction North.
- Gender: Unisex
- Language: English

Origin
- Meaning: Transferred use of the surname; “North, the cardinal direction”

North or Northwest is a unisex given name, a transferred use of the English surname.

North has been in rare, occasional use as a masculine given name in the Anglosphere since the 1800s, usually as a transferred use of a family surname. More attention was given to the name in 2013, when Kanye West and Kim Kardashian gave the name to their daughter, North West, whose first name and last name combine the names for two cardinal directions to form a pun. The given name North is used for both males and females in the United States, but remains more common as a masculine name.

In fiction, North is the eponymous character of the 1994 American film North.

== See also ==
- Northwest Smith, fictional character, and the hero of a series of stories by science fiction writer C. L. Moore
