= Henry North =

Henry North may refer to:

- Henry North (cricketer) (1883–1952), New Zealand cricketer
- Henry Ringling North (1909–1993), American businessman and circus proprietor
- Henry North (died 1620) (1556–1620), MP for Cambridgeshire and Cambridge
- Sir Henry North, 1st Baronet (c. 1609–1671), English politician
- Sir Henry North, 2nd Baronet (c.1635–1695), MP for Suffolk

== See also ==
- North (surname)
