= Charles North =

Charles North may refer to:

- Charles North (poet) (born 1941), American poet, essayist and teacher
- Charles North (politician) (1887–1979), Western Australian politician
- Charles North (MP), MP for Banbury
- Charles North, Baltimore, a neighborhood in north Baltimore, Maryland

== See also ==
- St. Charles North High School, Illinois
- North (surname)
