= Ellinger, Texas =

City in Texas, US

- City
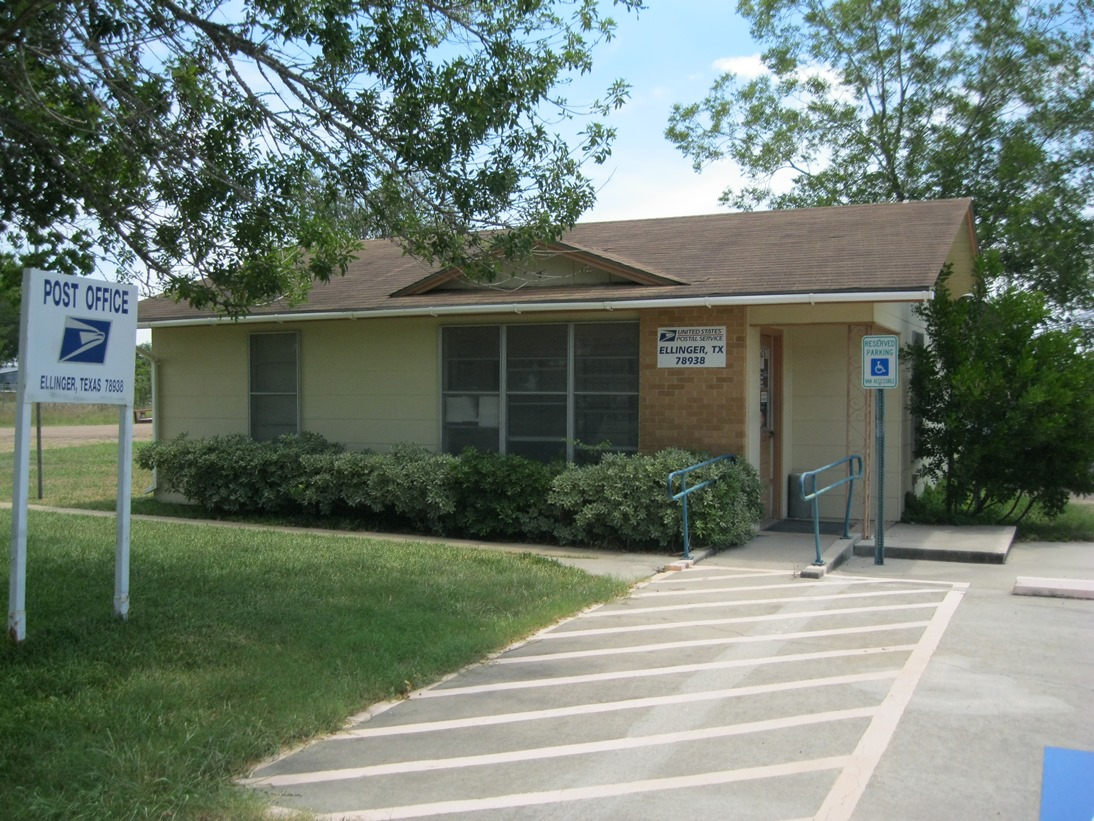
- Ellinger post office

- Location within Texas Location within the United States
- Coordinates: 29°50′15″N 96°42′18″W
- Country: United States
- State: Texas
- County: Fayette

Government
  - Mayor: Matt Mikulenka
- Elevation: 285 ft (87 m)
- Time zone: UTC-6 (Central (CST))
  - Summer (DST): UTC-5 (CDT)
- ZIP code: 78938
- Area code: 979
- GNIS feature ID: 2829833
- Website: www.ellingertx.com

Ellinger is a city in Fayette County, Texas, United States. Its population was at 203 as of 2021. It is located on Texas State Highway 71 (TX 71) about 12 miles (19 km) southeast of La Grange and 2.0 miles (3.2 km) from the Colorado County line.

== Geography ==
In the Texas Land Survey System (TLSS), various heads of families were granted leagues of land, and these leagues were named for those recipients. The Boundaries of Voting Precincts Act labelled Ellinger as being composed of "all parts of the W.O. Burnham league and Lucy Kerr league which lay southeast of Sarrazin's Creek" and "all parts of the Jos. Duty, W.T. Dunlavy, and Jus. Ehlinger lying in Fayette County". Elections within these bounds were to be held in the city center of Ellinger.

Of this location, 100 acres were privately owned by John H. Meyer and another 100 by Henry Fordtran. Fordtran was a native of Galveston. According to Frank Lotto's Fayette County: her history and her people, Andreas Ondrey (a Bohemian native) suggested the name to the superintendent of the Southern Pacific Railroad. Ellinger was located on a branch of this railroad, which allowed for its early success as a community.

Ellinger is located about 2.87 miles (4.62 km) from the Colorado River and 5.30 miles (8.53 km) from Lake Fayette. The town is located on a slope. TX 71 forms the southwest border of the town and the river plain ranges from 58.1 m at the water to 87.0 m at this border of the town. The northeast border of Ellinger, situated at East Tobias Road, reaches 97.4 m. Past the border, the river plain continues around two more miles before it begins to rise again. At a ridge northwest of the town, elevation jumps to about 108 m and gains altitude in steps as it increases in distance from the river. To the southeast of the town, elevation remains constant around 98 m save for a small east-west range of hills reaching to 110 m and stretching several miles east of Ellinger.

== Historical development ==
The Ellinger website claims that Joseph Ehlinger, a French soldier (born in Alsace) who served under Napoleon, received a portion of land for his services. He retrieved his family from Europe to bring them to this new home, and shortly after, died of drowning near Houston. His son, Charles Ehlinger, founded the town on this land as Live Oak Hill, a few miles north of where it sits today. Charles was an influential figure in the early town, as a farmer, bank board member (First State Bank of Ellinger), and the first postmaster of the town.

Ellinger is currently located along the Southern Pacific Railroad, which missed the original Live Oak Hill by two miles. The town moved to be closer to the railroad, which gave it business and travelers. When the town moved, the silent H was removed and the name was changed to Ellinger. Ladd P. Ehlinger, a descendant of Joseph and Charles Ehlinger, says this is because "it was easier for people to phonetically spell it". The Ellinger official website states that this change happened "when the railroad came through".

According to Lotto's book, Ellinger was laid out in 1883. The oldest local businessmen at the time of writing (1902) were Messrs. J. and B. Wacker, who owned a general store selling "staple and fancy groceries, hardware and crockery, and especially a fine assortment of pistols, guns, and ammunition". These men were said to have established their store in 1884, one year after the founding of the town. Further business owners included the Hotmann, Meyer, Rosenburg, and Hill families.

Lotto also documents the existence of two churches - one Lutheran and one Catholic. The Lutheran church, called St. John, is still in operation. It is operated by Shared Lutheran Ministries of Fayette County, at the corner of Fayette and Grover Streets. Communion and worship are held every Sunday at 8:00 am, served by a Pastor Marcia Kifer along with churches in Fayetteville, Warrenton, and Rutersville.

A post office is currently operating on FM 2503 in Ellinger, said by the Texas State Historical Association to have been founded in 1877, but no primary source documents this date, notably the USPS post office finder or Frank Lotto's 1902 book.

Production of cotton carried the local economy in the early 1900s, and in previous eras, Ellinger was a commercial center for farmers of cotton within the region. In 1900, the town had 14 businesses and a thriving community, but it began to decline in the early part of the 20th century with the building of the Missouri-Kansas and Texas Railroad, a large railway which passed through nearby Fayetteville and missed Ellinger.

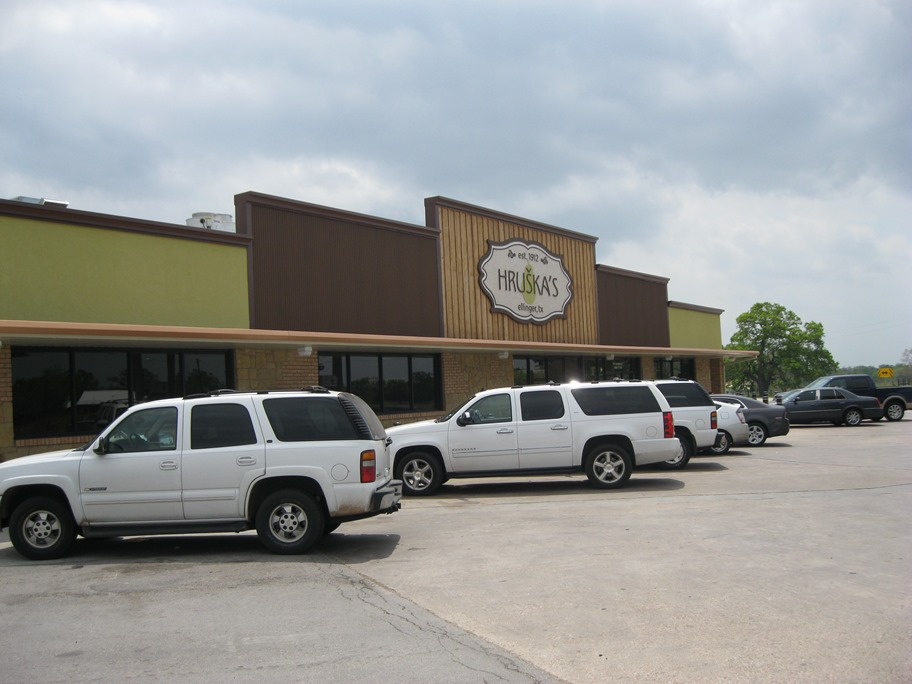
Hruska's Store and Bakery in Ellinger

The success of the railroad rerouted much business around Ellinger to Fayetteville, though its agricultural business, which shifted to ranching, grains, and pecans by midcentury, kept it afloat. In 1902, the town had a general store (run by J. and B. Wacker), a lumber business stocking such items as "a nail to a stump-pulling machine" (C.F. Steves), a drugstore (run by E.J. Weber, who was also a notary public), a cotton gin (W.F. Burow), a mechanic (J.Y. Machalek), and a barroom (of the Scheel Brothers), a common meetingplace for farmers in the area. Also, a saloon was on the original Live Oak Hill property, owned and run by Mr. Aug. Girndt and often used for dancing.

As of 1990, about 200 people resided in the town. Only two rated businesses were within city limits.

Gerald E. McLeod of the Austin Chronicle said in 2011 that Ellinger was a "speed trap" with three businesses.

Ellinger is home to Andrea Polasek, celebrity judge of the Chopped Challenge and cohost of the upcoming season of Diners Drive-ins and Dives with husband Guy Fieri.

An incorporation election was held in the community on November 3, 2020. In total, 120 votes were cast with 76 residents (63.3%) voting in favor of incorporating Ellinger as a Type C general-law municipality and 44 (36.7%) opposed. Residents were also given the option of choosing a mayor and two commissioners in the event that incorporation measure passed. All three candidates ran unopposed. Matt Mikulenka was elected mayor with 92 votes, while Joseph Lamer and Kenneth Stojanik were elected commissioners with 85 and 83 votes, respectively.

In May 2021, the city received a $18,300 grant from the Lower Colorado River Authority and Bluebonnet Electric Cooperative. The Community Development Grant and matching funds were to allow the city to purchase a portable building for house records and act as a hub for city-related business. The grant also was to cover the costs of creating a gravel pad for the building, establishing electrical service to it, and making the site accessible to disabled visitors.

== Education ==
It is in the La Grange Independent School District.

Areas in LaGrange ISD are assigned to Blinn Junior College District.
