= Austin serial bombings =

Series of consecutive bombings in Austin, Texas, US

- Bombing locations in Austin, Texas, United States Locations of all bombings
- Location: Austin, Schertz, and Round Rock, Texas, United States
- Date: March 2, 2018 – March 21, 2018
- Attack type: Serial bombing; murder; pedicide; attempted murder; murder-suicide; suicide bombing
- Weapon: Package bombs
- Deaths: 3 (including the perpetrator)
- Injuries: 6
- Perpetrator: Mark Anthony Conditt
- Motive: Unknown

The Austin serial bombings occurred between March 2 and March 21, 2018, mostly in Austin, Texas, United States. In total, five package bombs exploded, killing two people and injuring another five. The perpetrator, 23-year-old Mark Anthony Conditt of Pflugerville, Texas, was pulled over by police on March 21. Conditt detonated an explosive inside his vehicle, killing himself and injuring a police officer.

== Bombings ==
On March 2, 2018, 39-year-old Anthony Stephan House was killed by picking up an apparent package bomb at his home. Austin Police Department Assistant Chief Joseph Chacon floated a theory that House might have bombed himself, perhaps while assembling the device. Chacon also told residents not to worry.

On March 12, 17-year-old Draylen Mason was murdered and his mother injured by an explosion, and another explosion that day seriously injured 75-year-old Esperanza Herrera, who was visiting her elderly mother's house. The second of the March 12 bombs was reportedly addressed to a different address.

A suspected tripwire-activated package bomb injured two men (a 22-year-old and a 23-year-old) in a residential neighborhood in southwest Austin on March 18. The men suffered serious, although not life-threatening, injuries. Unlike the previous bombs, which were left on doorsteps, this bomb was left on the side of the road, attached to a "Drive Like Your Kids Live Here" sign. Following this fourth blast, Austin Police warned the public of a "serial bomber" possessing "a higher level of sophistication, a higher level of skill" than initially thought.

On March 20, around 12:25 a.m., a bomb exploded in a package at a FedEx Ground facility in Schertz, Texas, injuring one employee. The package was intended for an address in the city of Austin. Later that day, another package bomb was intercepted and defused at a separate FedEx facility in southeast Austin. The two packages were sent by the same person from a FedEx store in Sunset Valley.

=== Timetable ===
No.	Date (Note: Local time is listed: CST before March 11, and CDT afterwards.)	Location	Deaths	Injuries	Type
1	06:55, March 2, 2018	Private residence in Harris Ridge, Austin, Texas	1	0	Package bomb
2	06:44, March 12, 2018	Private residence in East MLK, Austin, Texas	1	1	Package bomb
3	11:50, March 12, 2018	Private residence in Montopolis, Austin, Texas	0	1	Package bomb
4	20:30, March 18, 2018	Near a road in Travis Country, Austin, Texas	0	2	Tripwire-activated bomb
5	00:25, March 20, 2018	FedEx Ground facility in Schertz, Texas	0	1	Package bomb
6	06:19, March 20, 2018 (Note: Approximate time that the device was reported to police.)	FedEx Ground facility in Austin, Texas	Defused		Package bomb
7	~02:00, March 21, 2018	Near I-35 Frontage Road in Round Rock, Texas	1 (Note: The bombing on March 21, 2018, killed Mark Anthony Conditt, the serial bomber. He was killed after setting off a bomb inside his vehicle while pulled over and one SWAT officer was knocked back by this blast, sustaining minor injuries.)	1	Package bomb

== Investigation ==
=== Initial theories ===
After the first bombing, the Austin Police Department (APD) announced it was investigating the death of House as a possible homicide. Chief Brian Manley said "we have no reason to believe this is anything beyond an isolated incident that took place at this residence, and no reason to believe this is in any way linked to a terrorist act. But we are not making any assumptions. We are conducting a thorough investigation to rule that out." On the following Monday, March 5, Austin police identified the first victim as Anthony Stephan House, and said the death was being treated as suspicious. The first police theory was that House was an unintended victim who was killed by a bomb meant for someone else, perhaps a suspected drug dealer who lived in the neighborhood. Assistant Chief Joseph Chacon said police "can't rule out that Mr. House didn't construct this himself and accidentally detonate it, in which case it would be an accidental death." Later, police began to investigate House's finances.

=== Serial bombing connections ===
After the third bombing, the APD began to investigate the connections between the victims. House's father was close friends with Mason's grandfather. Both of the elderly men attend the same church and are prominent members of the African-American community in Austin. Police also cautioned the public against opening suspicious packages, and advised them to call the police instead. Because the bombs appeared to target the east side of Austin, which predominantly consists of poorer, African-American and Latino residents, local activists questioned whether the police advisory and investigation was delayed. By March 20, the police had received more than 1,200 calls about suspicious packages.

Over 500 agents of the Federal Bureau of Investigation (FBI) and the Bureau of Alcohol, Tobacco, Firearms and Explosives (ATF) assisted local police in the investigation. Representative Michael McCaul called it "probably the biggest investigation since the Boston bombings." Former deputy director of the FBI Weldon L. Kennedy told news outlets he believed the culprit was a single, highly organized and efficient person because of the rapid pace of the bombings, use of package bombs, and apparent proficiency in the creation of explosives. By March 20, Texas Governor Greg Abbott had allocated $265,000 in government spending for the investigation.

Austin police officially connected the March 2 bombing following the bombings on March 12. The first three packages were not mailed, but instead placed near victims' homes. Two of the first three bombs were triggered upon being picked up, and another triggered upon being opened. The fourth bomb was activated by tripwire. The fifth bomb was triggered in a sorting facility in Schertz, and the sixth was discovered and disarmed in a similar sorting facility in Austin. A FedEx store in the Austin suburb of Sunset Valley was cordoned off early in the morning of March 20 after local police tracked down the origin of the package that exploded at the sorting facility in Schertz.

Police first offered a reward of $65,000 for information leading to an arrest and conviction of the bomber or bombers. Later, this sum was increased to $100,000 and the Texas Governor's office added another $15,000.

=== Police search and death of perpetrator ===
Police discovered the bombs used some common household ingredients. As part of the investigation, agents collected and reviewed receipts and sales records from stores for suspicious purchases of those components. This review identified Mark Anthony Conditt as a person of interest. Specifically, a large purchase of nails (to be used as shrapnel in the bombs) by Conditt at a Home Depot in Round Rock alerted investigators, as well as uncommon batteries used in the bombs that came from Asia. A federal search warrant was obtained for Conditt's IP address, and the evidence gathered indicated he had used Google to search for information on shipping.

Investigators also obtained a witness sketch of the man. Conditt was captured on security videotape at the FedEx store in Sunset Valley, where he had shipped two explosive devices. The surveillance footage captured a red 2002 Ford Ranger with no license plate; investigators examined records for all matching cars in Texas for white males possibly in their 20s. The footage also captured the man wearing pink construction gloves sold at Home Depot stores; by examining "hours of surveillance video from Home Depot locations in and around Austin" investigators were able to find footage showing what appeared to be the same man. This evidence allowed investigators to narrow the range of persons of interest to a small number of people.

At least one neighbor of Conditt noticed several people sitting in parked cars along the street on the night of March 20, which she now believes were unmarked police vehicles quietly staking out his house. Early on March 21, police moved in to make an arrest. They tracked Conditt to a hotel room in Round Rock (north of Austin), then onto Interstate 35, where they pulled him over at around 2:00 a.m. (CDT). As SWAT officers approached, he detonated a bomb in the vehicle, killing himself and injuring one officer, prompting other officers to fire upon the vehicle. The Austin Police Department closed a southbound section of the interstate where FBI and ATF agents were dispatched to investigate.

== Perpetrator ==
Conditt in a photo shared by his mother in 2013

Mark Anthony Conditt (June 16, 1994 – March 21, 2018) lived in Pflugerville, Texas, outside Austin. He grew up in a very religious Christian family. The eldest of three children, he attended Austin Community College from 2010 to 2012, leaving without graduating but in good academic standing. He was home-schooled by his mother, who in February 2013 "officially graduated" him from high school. He wrote blog posts in 2012, where he identified as a conservative who was "not that politically inclined"; he argued for the death penalty, and argued against same-sex marriages and sex offender registries. He reportedly was part of a club called Righteous Invasion of Truth (R.I.O.T.), apparently named after a Carman song. The club's members home-schooled children, practiced survivalism, and held Bible studies.

Conditt moved out of his family's home a few years before the bombings and into a house nearby that he bought with his father and lived in with two roommates. He spent several years as an employee of Crux Manufacturing, which makes semiconductors, but he was fired eight months before the bombings for poor performance. He had no criminal record.

Police found a 25-minute video on Conditt's phone in which he described the devices and confessed to the bombings, but the video does not explain how he chose his victims. Austin police chief Brian Manley described the video as "the outcry of a very challenged young man talking about challenges in his life that led him to this point." He declined to label Conditt a domestic terrorist, because "he does not at all mention anything about terrorism, nor does he mention anything about hate." Texas Governor Greg Abbott wondered "Was his goal to terrorize, or did he have some other type of agenda? Obviously, there was terror." The video has not been released. On March 29, after criticism of his earlier statements, Chief Manley reversed his stance and called Conditt "a domestic terrorist for what he did to us".

== Aftermath ==
In response to the bombings, FedEx instituted a new policy on April 2, 2018, requiring all retail customers to provide government photo identification that includes their return address to ship packages.

On March 17, Live Nation Music, a company organizing events for the annual South by Southwest film and music festival (which ran from March 9 to 18), received a bomb threat via email. Additional threats were made by phone to the eBay customer service center in Austin. Police searched the area mentioned in the email and found nothing of concern, but planned performances by The Roots and Ludacris, among others, were canceled. Police arrested 26-year-old Trevor Weldon Ingram the next day; Ingram is charged with making a terroristic threat, a third-degree felony, in connection with the email. Police do not believe Ingram had any link to the explosions in Texas.

On March 20, a man was burned by a device described as an "artillery simulator device" in a donation box at a Goodwill in South Austin, and was taken to St. David's South Austin Medical Center. ATF agents and police officers quickly responded to the scene, and firefighters of the Austin Fire Department (AFD) evacuated the building of civilians. The Austin Police Department announced shortly afterward via Twitter that this appeared unrelated to the serial bomber.

== See also ==
- Ted Kaczynski, American domestic terrorist who used package bombs from 1978 to 1995
- Luke Helder, American former student known as the Midwest Pipe Bomber of May 2002
- 2001 anthrax attacks, similar case in which parcel/courier carriers were used to attack
- Larry North, who attempted a bombing campaign in 2010
- October 2018 United States mail bombing attempts, series of bombs sent to public figures
