= Christopher North =

Christopher North may refer to:

- John Wilson (Scottish writer) (1785–1854), who wrote for Blackwood's Magazine under the pseudonym "Christopher North"
- Christopher North (Ambrosia) (1951–2026), American keyboardist, from the rock band Ambrosia
- Christopher North (composer) (born 1969), American composer, songwriter, and musician
- Christopher North (businessman) (born 1970), American CEO

== See also ==
- Chris Noth (born 1954), American actor
- Christopher Nöthe (born 1988), German professional football
