= Weißenburg in Bayern =

- Town
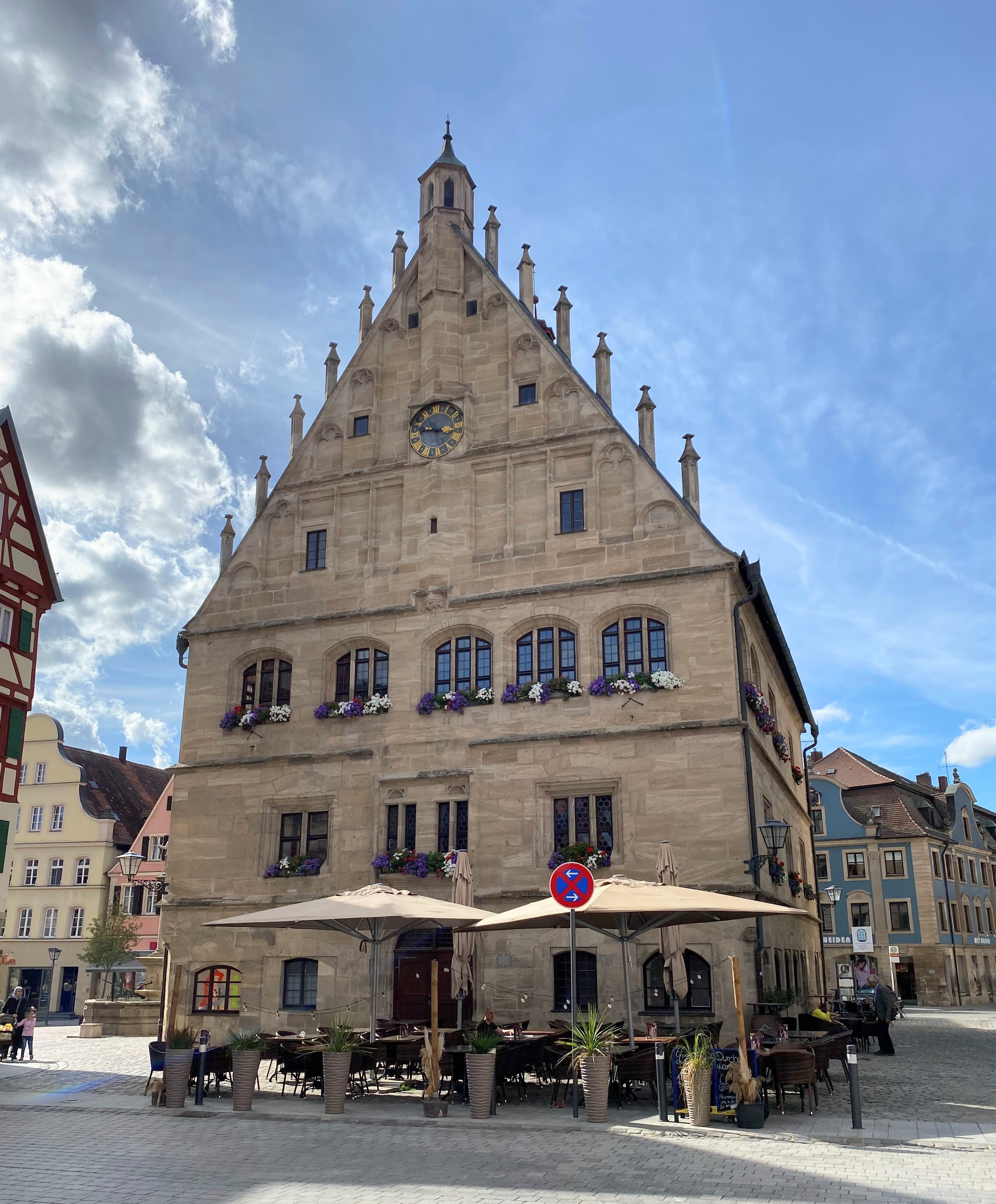
- The old town hall of Weißenburg is one of the icons of the city

- Coat of arms

- Location of Weißenburg in Bayern within Weißenburg-Gunzenhausen district
- Interactive map of Weißenburg in Bayern
- Location within Germany Location within Bavaria
- Coordinates: 49°01′50″N 10°58′19″E
- Country: Germany
- State: Bavaria
- Admin. region: Middle Franconia
- District: Weißenburg-Gunzenhausen
- Subdivisions: 27 Ortsteile

Government
  - Mayor (2020–26): Jürgen Schröppel (SPD)

Area
  - Total: 97.58 km^{2} (37.68 sq mi)
- Elevation: 422 m (1,385 ft)

Population (2025-12-31)
  - Total: 18,172
  - Density: 186.2/km^{2} (482.3/sq mi)
- Time zone: UTC+01:00 (CET)
  - Summer (DST): UTC+02:00 (CEST)
- Postal codes: 91781
- Dialling codes: 09141
- Vehicle registration: WUG
- Website: www.weissenburg.de

Weißenburg in Bayern (German pronunciation: [ˈvaɪsn̩bʊʁk ʔɪn ˈbaɪɐn], lit. 'Weißenburg in Bavaria'), formerly known as Weißenburg im Nordgau and Weißenburg am Sand, is a town in Middle Franconia, Germany. It is the capital of the district Weißenburg-Gunzenhausen, with a population of 18,345 as of 2024. Weißenburg was a free imperial city for 500 years.

== Geography ==
=== Location ===
Weißenburg is located in central Bavaria, in the south of the administrative region Mittelfranken. Large nearby cities are Ingolstadt (55.5 km), Nuremberg (61.7 km), Augsburg (85 km), Munich (134.6 km), and Würzburg (150.4 km).

=== Subdivision ===
The municipality is divided into 27 Ortsteile: the main town and the 26 villages of Dettenheim, Emetzheim, Gänswirtshaus, Haardt, Hagenbuch, Hammermühle, Hattenhof, Häuser am Wülzburger Berg, Heuberg, Holzingen, Kattenhochstatt, Kehl, Laubenthal, Markhof, Niederhofen, Oberhochstatt, Potschmühle, Rohrwalk, Rothenstein (Weißenburg), Schleifer am Berg, Schmalwiesen, Stadelhof, Suffersheim, Weimersheim, Weißenhof and Wülzburg.

== History ==
=== Early history ===
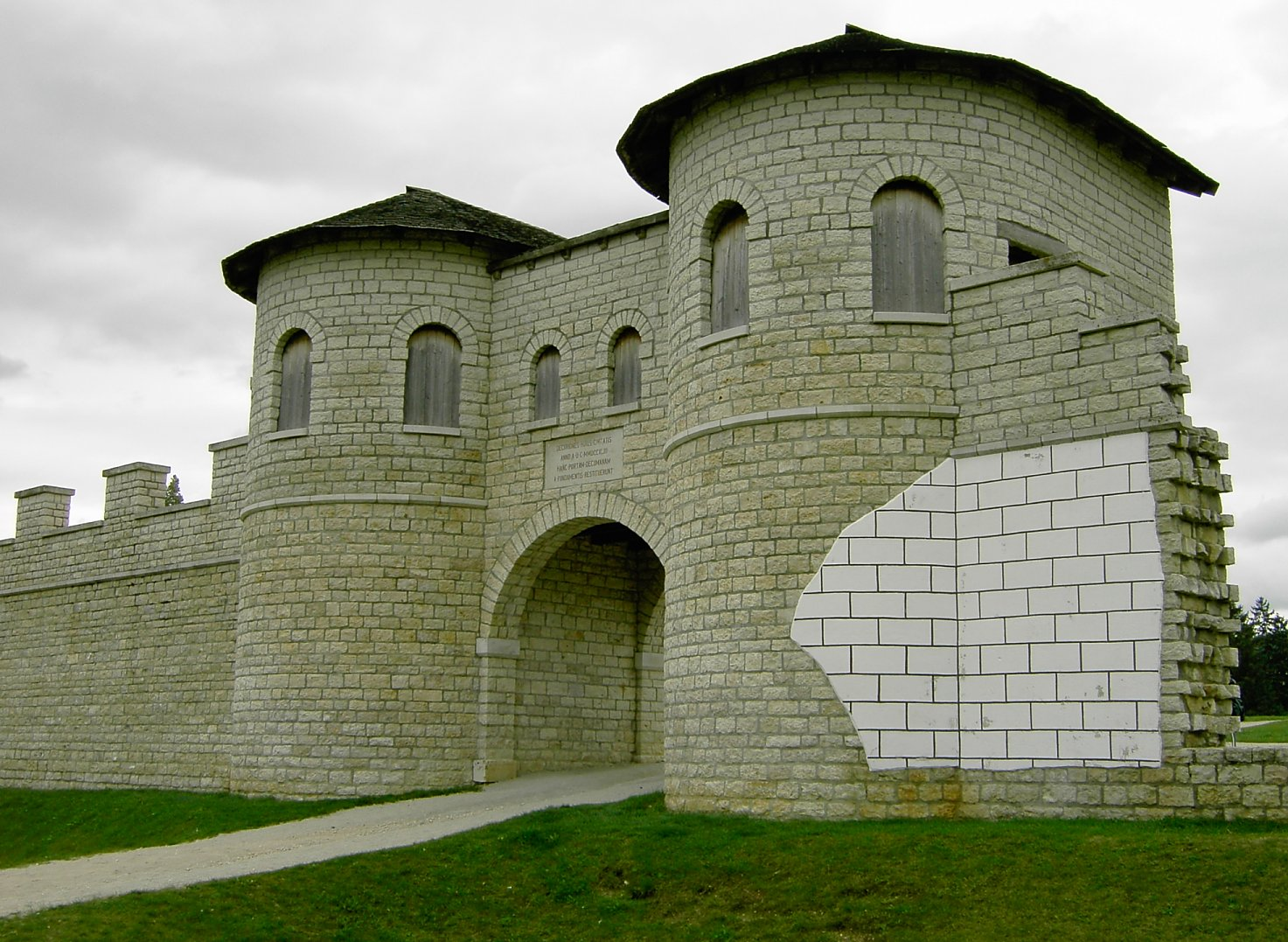
A modern replica of Castell Biriciana

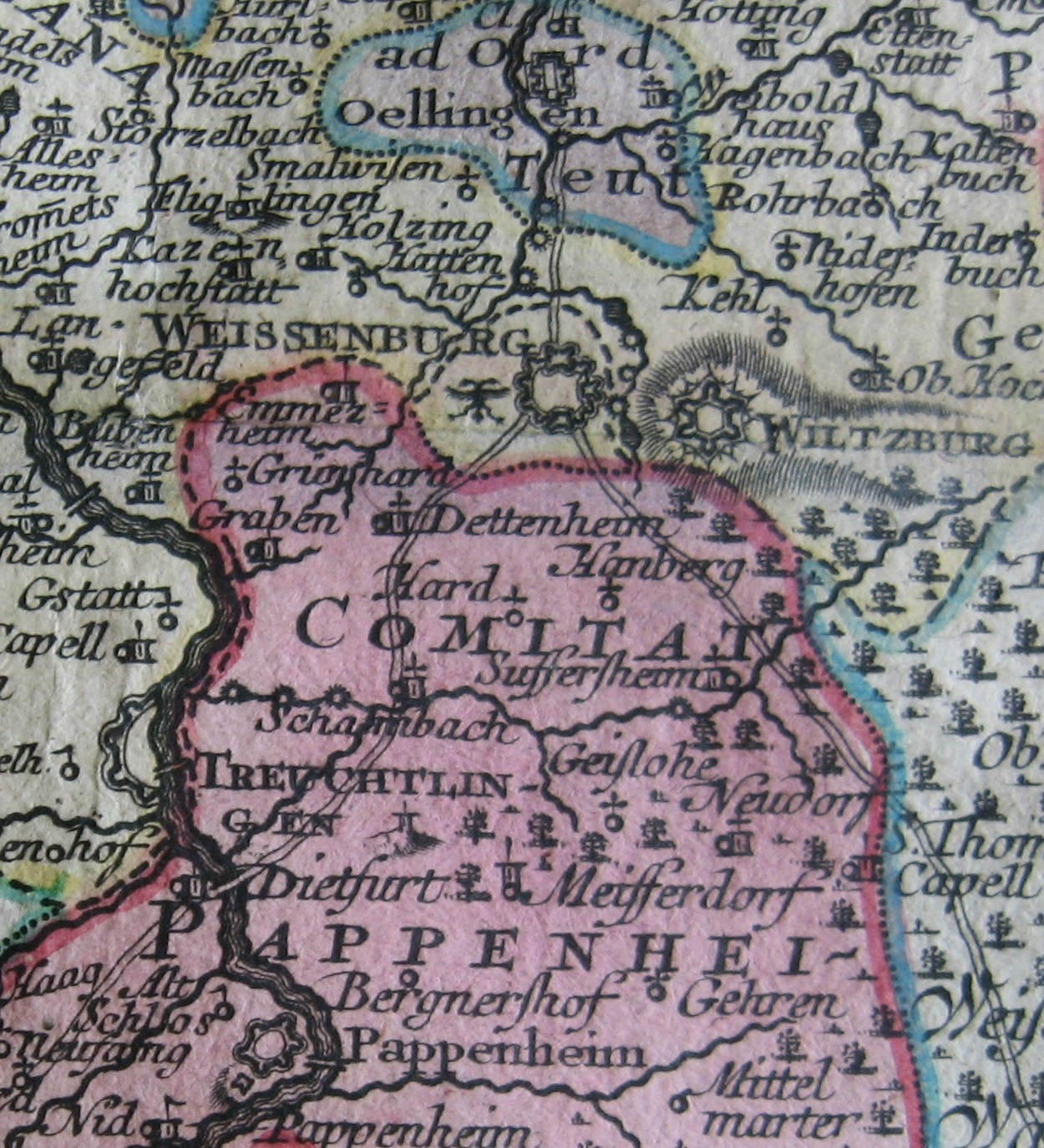
The Free Imperial City of Weißenburg

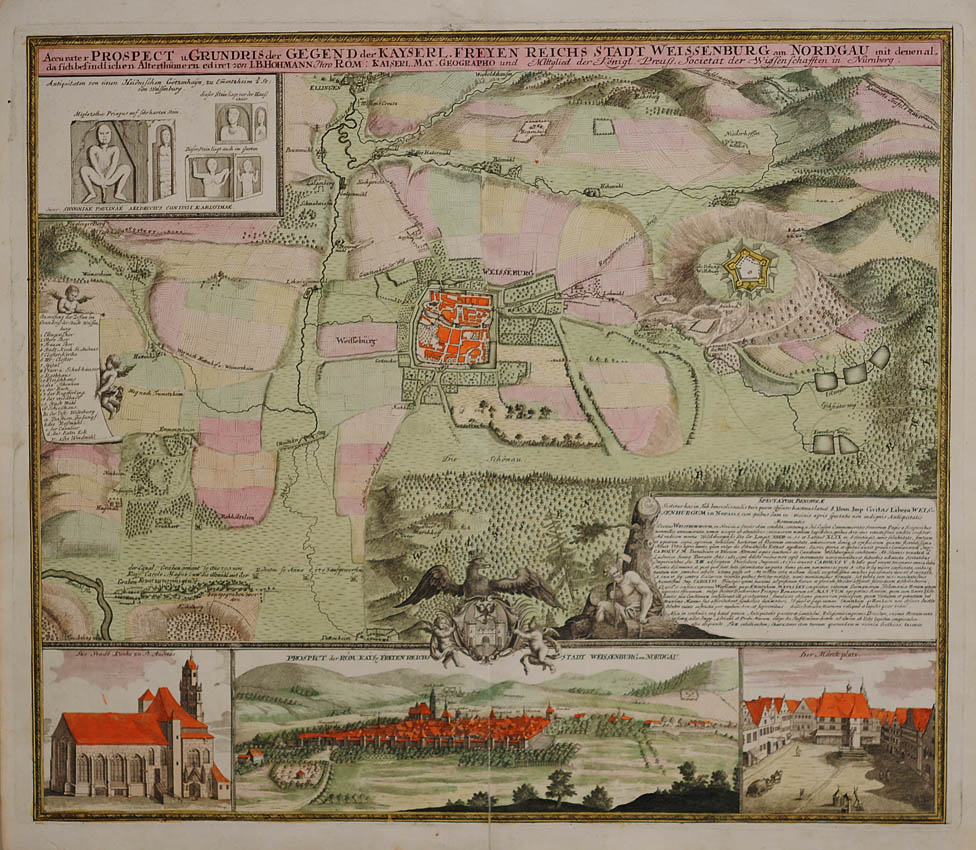
Illustrated map of Weißenburg, c. 1725

The history of Weißenburg is generally traced back to the Roman fort that was built in the area towards the end of the first century. The settlement, which included Thermae, lay on the border of the Roman Empire and on the Tabula Peutingeriana from the 4th century it had the name Biriciana. Germanic tribes destroyed the fort and settled in what is still the city centre. The first mention of the name Weißenburg is in a deed dating from 867. The city became the seat of a royal residence during the reign of the Franks and according to legend, Charlemagne stayed there to supervise the construction of Fossa Carolina.

The city became a Free Imperial City in 1296 and continued to grow until the Reformation. Following the example of Nuremberg the city joined the Protestant side but it suffered heavily in the ensuing wars. However, the rights of the city as a Free Imperial City and an Imperial Estate were restored in the final peace treaty and some growth resumed. Despite its insignificant size and economic importance, the city, like the other 50-odd free imperial cities, was virtually independent.

=== Modern history ===
Weißenburg lost its independence in 1802 and became part of the Bavarian kingdom in 1806. It was however saved from insignificance with the construction of a railway between Nuremberg and Augsburg which goes through the city and which supported industrialisation. Following World War II over 6,000 refugees and people expelled from the territories which Germany lost, settled in the city, and have since played an important role in its industry and culture.

The many stages in the history of Weißenburg can still be seen today. There are many ruins from the Roman times. One of the finest is the remains of a Roman bath which was excavated in 1977 and has been turned into a museum. The city wall from the Middle Ages has survived almost intact with its towers and in the Gothic Town Hall the city's elected members have held their meetings from 1476.

== Sights ==
- The Ellinger Tor is the most famous City gate of Weißenburg.
- The Bismarck tower is a memorial to the first German chancellor Otto von Bismarck.
- The Castra Birciana is a former Roman military camp.

=== Wülzburg ===
Wülzburg is a historic fortress about 2 kilometres (1.2 mi) east of the centre of Weißenburg. It stands on a hill 200 metres (660 ft) above Weißenburg, at an elevation of 630.5 metres (2,069 ft), and was originally a Benedictine monastery dating from the 11th century. It was converted into a fortress from 1588 to 1605 and is one of the best-preserved Renaissance fortresses in Germany. Today it is part of the city of Weißenburg.

During World War I, the future French leader Charles De Gaulle was imprisoned at the Wülzburg. The Nazis also used it as a prison camp during World War II; it was here that the Czech composer Erwin Schulhoff was held for over a year before he died of TB.

== Climate ==
Climate data for Weißenburg in Bayern (1991–2020 normals)
Month	Jan	Feb	Mar	Apr	May	Jun	Jul	Aug	Sep	Oct	Nov	Dec	Year
Mean daily maximum °C (°F)	3.1 (37.6)	5.0 (41.0)	9.8 (49.6)	15.1 (59.2)	19.4 (66.9)	22.9 (73.2)	24.9 (76.8)	24.8 (76.6)	19.7 (67.5)	13.9 (57.0)	7.5 (45.5)	3.8 (38.8)	14.2 (57.6)
Daily mean °C (°F)	0.3 (32.5)	1.1 (34.0)	4.9 (40.8)	9.4 (48.9)	13.8 (56.8)	17.2 (63.0)	19.0 (66.2)	18.7 (65.7)	14.0 (57.2)	9.4 (48.9)	4.5 (40.1)	1.3 (34.3)	9.5 (49.1)
Mean daily minimum °C (°F)	−2.5 (27.5)	−2.4 (27.7)	0.4 (32.7)	3.5 (38.3)	7.8 (46.0)	11.2 (52.2)	13.0 (55.4)	12.8 (55.0)	8.9 (48.0)	5.5 (41.9)	1.7 (35.1)	−1.2 (29.8)	4.9 (40.8)
Average precipitation mm (inches)	44.3 (1.74)	37.3 (1.47)	44.5 (1.75)	38.1 (1.50)	69.0 (2.72)	75.9 (2.99)	83.9 (3.30)	71.7 (2.82)	49.2 (1.94)	51.3 (2.02)	48.8 (1.92)	52.5 (2.07)	666.5 (26.24)
Average precipitation days (≥ 1.0 mm)	15.9	13.5	14.5	12.5	14.0	14.5	15.1	13.7	12.7	14.3	14.2	17.0	171.9
Average snowy days (≥ 1.0 cm)	10.6	9.8	3.7	0.4	0	0	0	0	0	0	2.1	8.0	34.6
Average relative humidity (%)	83.0	79.1	73.6	66.5	67.7	68.5	67.6	69.2	75.4	81.7	85.6	85.3	75.3
Mean monthly sunshine hours	57.2	85.7	135.2	188.5	219.4	229.1	239.6	228.2	165.9	109.9	54.0	45.4	1,749
Source: World Meteorological Organization

== Notable people ==
- Gustav Ritter von Kahr (1862–1934), politician
- Hans Hofmann (1880–1966), painter
- Rudolf Nebel (1894–1978), rocket pioneer and engineer
- Markus Steinhöfer (born 1986), footballer
