= Richard B. North =

American neurosurgeon

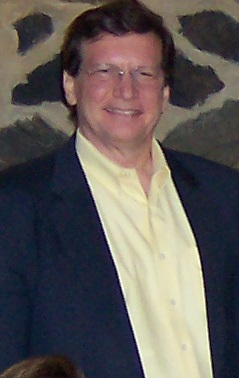
- Born: New Jersey, United States
- Education: Harvard University; Duke University; Johns Hopkins School of Medicine
- Known for: Spinal neurosurgery/spinal cord stimulation
- Scientific career
- Fields: Neurosurgery
- Workplaces: Johns Hopkins School of Medicine

Richard B. North is a doctor who practices neurosurgery in Baltimore, Maryland.

At the Johns Hopkins University School of Medicine, he directed the Neurosurgery Spine Service for 16 years and co-directed the Division of Functional Neurosurgery. He was Professor of Neurosurgery, Anesthesiology and Critical Care Medicine at Johns Hopkins for 10 years, and a member of the full-time faculty for 25. He also received his medical degree and post-doctoral biomedical engineering and neurosurgery training at Johns Hopkins.

North is certified by the American Board of Neurological Surgery and the American Board of Pain Medicine. He holds a number of patents in the field of implanted electrical stimulation devices. The American Academy of Pain Medicine has recognized North's research achievements and clinical expertise with the academy's prestigious Founder's Award, and the North American Neuromodulation Society with its Lifetime Achievement Award. He serves as president of the nonprofit Neuromodulation Foundation (Neuromodfound.org), which is active in developing clinical trial designs and practice parameters.

North is the owner of Marcel Breuer's Hooper House II in Baltimore County, MD.
