= Dudley North =

Dudley North may refer to:

- Dudley North, 3rd Baron North (1581–1666), English nobleman and politician
- Dudley North, 4th Baron North (1602–1677), English nobleman and politician, son of the above
- Sir Dudley North (economist) (1641–1691), English economist, son of the above
- Dudley North (politician, born 1684) (1684–1730), English landowner and politician, son of the above
- Dudley Long North (1748–1829), English Whig politician, great-grandson of the economist
- Sir Dudley North (Royal Navy officer) (1881–1961), Royal Navy admiral
- Dudley North (UK Parliament constituency)
