= Alberto del Saz =

Alberto "Tito" del Saz is a former ice skater, a professional dancer, an instructor, and the Artistic Director of The Alwin Nikolais / Murray Louis Foundation for Dance.

== Early life ==
Del Saz grew up in Bilbao, Spain and began ice-skating in his childhood which became his first performing career. In 1979 Del Saz was the Spanish National Champion in figure skating. After this he performed with Holiday on Ice-International. After working on Holiday on Ice, he turned to dance as the next step in his career. Del Saz moved to New York City and wrote to dance luminaries Martha Graham, Merce Cunningham, and Paul Taylor before he found a place with the Alwin Nikolais and Murray Louis dance companies. He trained with Nikolais and Louis for a year before officially joining the company in 1985.

== Dance and teaching career ==
Del Saz became a lead soloist with the Nikolais Dance Theater when he joined the company in 1985. He toured with the company until it closed in 1999. He became the co-director of the Nikolais/Louis Foundation for Dance appointed by Murray Louis. Since Louis died in 2016, Del Saz has become the sole Artistic Director of the Foundation.

Originally the Foundation included the Nikolais Dance Theater, The Murray Louis Dance Company, and The School and Chimerafilm, an audio-visual component. When Nikolais died in 1993 the dance companies were combined. They were then phased out in 1999 and in 2003 a partnership with the Ririe-Woodbury Dance Company was solidified. This partnership allowed the Ririe-Woodbury Dance Company to be the only company allowed to perform full evening performances of Nikolais/Louis works. Del Saz has collaborated with and has directed the Ririe-Woodbury Dance Company when they perform Nikolais repertory. This close collaboration allows Del Saz to impart not just the choreography of a piece, but the way Nikolais worked with dancers and the philosophy behind the movements.

In 2010 and 2011 Del Saz was the director of the Nikolais/Louis centennial tour which visited over 18 colleges and universities including Boston Conservatory, the University of Washington, and NYU's Tisch School of the Arts. During this tour Del Saz traveled extensively, offered workshops, and taught classes.

In 2022, Del Saz presented a series of Master Classes in the Nikolais/Louis tradition in Rio de Janeiro. This was in collaboration with Rocio Infante, and associates.

Over the years Del Saz has worked with many artists and has been a guest solo artist in works by Hanya Holm, Claudia Gitelman, and Maureen Fleming among others. He also revisited the ice skating world by working with Nicole Bobek and Phillipe Candeloro on choreography.

As a teacher, Del Saz has held an Adjunct faculty position at Hunter College and teaches at Marymount Manhattan College.
