= Robert North =

Robert North may refer to:

- Robert North (producer) (1884–1976), American vaudeville performer, comedian, and film producer
- Robert North (choreographer) (born 1945), American dancer and choreographer
- Robert C. North (1914–2002), American political scientist
- Robert G. North (1913–1954), American screenwriter and reported CIA agent
- Robert G. North (1916-2007), Jesuit archaeologist who excavated at Teleilat el-Ghassul in 1959-60

== See also ==
- Rob North, American politician
