= David North =

David North may refer to:

- David North (politician) (born 1942), British politician
- David North (socialist) (born 1950), American Trotskyist
- David North (judge) (born 1956), Australian judge
- David North (character), Marvel Comics character
