= Larry North =

American attempted bomber

Larry Eugene North
- Known for: Attempted bombing campaign
- Criminal status: Sentenced to 87 months in prison

Larry Eugene North is an American man who, between February 5 and April 7, 2010, planted 36 improvised explosive devices in 26 locations across eastern Texas, mostly in mailboxes. None of the devices exploded, and nobody was injured. His motive was likely anger at the United States federal government over their inability to get his money back, after a bank executive allegedly stole close to a million dollars from him. He was arrested on April 7 after being seen placing a bomb into a mailbox in Tyler. He was charged with possession of an illegal firearm or destructive device, use of a weapon of mass destruction, and obstruction of mail. In June 2011, he pleaded guilty and was sentenced to 87 months in prison.

== Life ==
Larry Eugene North was from Henderson, in Rusk County, Texas. He was 52 at the time of the bombing attempts.

North received almost a million dollars from a settlement regarding an incident at his work, which left him paralyzed.

=== Bombing attempts ===
Between February 5 and April 7, 2010, North planted 36 improvised explosive devices in 26 different locations across eastern Texas. Half of them were in mailboxes and the other half were in assorted locations. Of the 36 devices, the final ten planted were pipe bombs. None of the devices exploded, and nobody was injured. Some of the bombs were duds as they contained cereal instead of gunpowder. Molotov cocktails and nooses were also found inside the mailboxes.

The investigation was headed by the ATF, FBI, Postal Inspection Service, Texas Rangers, Treasury Inspector General for Tax Administration, and others. A $25,000 reward was given for information.

Prosecutors and North's defense claimed his motive was anger at the United States federal government over their lack of help in getting his money back, after allegedly being scammed by a bank executive. North says he lost almost a million dollars when his bank closed. An executive at the bank supposedly spent thousands of dollars in North's name without his consent.

=== Arrest and conviction ===
The ATF found a UPC code written on one of the bomb's components, and cross-referenced it with purchases made in local stores. North had purchased the said component, and was seen on multiple stores' surveillance cameras purchasing bomb-making materials. At the beginning of April, he was put under surveillance. ATF agents were following him around Tyler on the morning of April 7. They spotted him placing a pipe bomb into a mailbox, where he was then arrested. A pipe bomb was found in the van he was driving, and bomb-making materials were discovered at his home.

He was indicted for possession of an illegal firearm or destructive device, use of a weapon of mass destruction, and obstruction of mail. In June 2011 he pleaded guilty. His defense asked for a sentence of 14 months in prison, but ultimately, he was sentenced to 87 months. He was released in July 2017.

== See also ==
- Austin serial bombings
