= John North (cricketer) =

English cricketer

Personal information
- Full name: John Andrew North
- Born: 19 November 1970 (age 55); Slindon, Sussex, England
- Height: 5 ft 11 in (1.80 m)
- Batting: Right-handed
- Bowling: Right-arm medium

Domestic team information
- Years: Team
- 1990–1995: Sussex

Career statistics
Competition	First-class	List A
Matches	23	49
Runs scored	513	440
Batting average	20.52	12.94
100s/50s	1/3	–/1
Top score	156	56
Balls bowled	2,641	1,190
Wickets	112	29
Bowling average	35.84	38.17
5 wickets in innings	–	–
10 wickets in match	–	–
Best bowling	4/47	3/24
Catches/stumpings	4/–	9/–
- Source: Cricinfo, 14 March 2012

John Andrew North (born 19 November 1970) is a former English first-class cricketer.

== Life and career ==
In 1990, North made a single Youth One Day International appearance for England Young Cricketers against Pakistan Young Cricketers. Prior to this, North had made his first-class debut for Sussex against Kent in the 1990 County Championship. He made 22 further first-class appearances for the county, the last of which came against Essex in the 1993 County Championship. An all-rounder, North scored a total of 513 runs in his 23 first-class appearances, which came at an average of 20.52, with a high score of 114. This score, which was his only first-class century, came against Essex in his final first-class match. With the ball, he took 44 wickets at a bowling average of 35.84, with best figures of 4/47.

North made his debut in List A cricket for the county in his debut season, against Middlesex in the Benson & Hedges Cup. Used more frequently as a one-day player, he made 48 further List A appearances for the county, the last of which came against Warwickshire in the 1995 AXA Equity & Law League. In his 49 List A appearances for the county, he scored a total of 440 runs at an average of 12.94, with a high score of 56. This score was his only List A half century and came against Durham in 1992. With the ball, he took 29 wickets at an average of 38.17, with best figures of 3/24.

With the emergence of all-rounder Robin Martin-Jenkins in 1995, North's opportunities at Sussex, which in his latter season with the county had become limited, became more so with Martin-Jenkins' emergence. He left Sussex at the end of the 1995 season, making subsequent appearances in Second XI cricket for Surrey, Northamptonshire and Nottinghamshire, but was unable to secure contracts with any.
