= Gary North =

Gary North may refer to:

- Gary North (economist) (1942–2022), American Christian economic historian and publisher
- Gary North (journalist), American writer and activist
- Gary L. North (born 1954), United States Air Force general
- Gary North (Emmerdale) a character who appeared in the British soap opera on 29 May 2014
