= Douglas M. North =

American academic administrator

Douglas M. North is Head of School of The Albany Academies. He is the former President of Alaska Pacific University and Prescott College.

North is a 1958 graduate of The Albany Academy, and completed undergraduate studies at Yale University. He received an M.A. from Syracuse University and a Ph.D. in English Literature from the University of Virginia.

North led Prescott College from 1989 until 1994, and Alaska Pacific University from 1995 until 2009, where he also served as Professor of Humanities.
