= George North (disambiguation) =

George North is a Welsh rugby union player.

George North may also refer to:

- George North (diplomat) (fl. 1561–1581), English man of letters
- George North (numismatist) (1707–1772), English cleric
- George North, 3rd Earl of Guilford (1757–1802), British politician
- George North (Tramountanas) (1822–1911), first settler of Greek origin in South Australia

== See also ==
- Prince George North, former electoral district in British Columbia, Canada
