= William North (disambiguation) =

William North (1755–1836) was an American soldier and politician

William North may also refer to:

- William Campbell North (1859–1924), American politician
- William North, 6th Baron North (1678–1734), English soldier and Jacobite
- William North (cricketer) (died 1855), English cricketer
- William North (mason) (1794–1872), American freemason
- William North (politician) (1850–1936), Irish-born Australian politician
