= Roger North =

Roger North may refer to:

- Roger North, 2nd Baron North (1530–1600), English peer
- Roger North (governor) (1585–1652), captain who sailed with Walter Raleigh in 1617 and only governor of the Oyapoc
- Roger North (biographer) (1653–1734), English lawyer, biographer, and amateur musician
- Roger North (died 1651) (1577–1651), English politician
