= Ellinger Tor =

City gate of Weißenburg in Bayern, Germany

Coordinates: 49.032695°N 10.971581°E

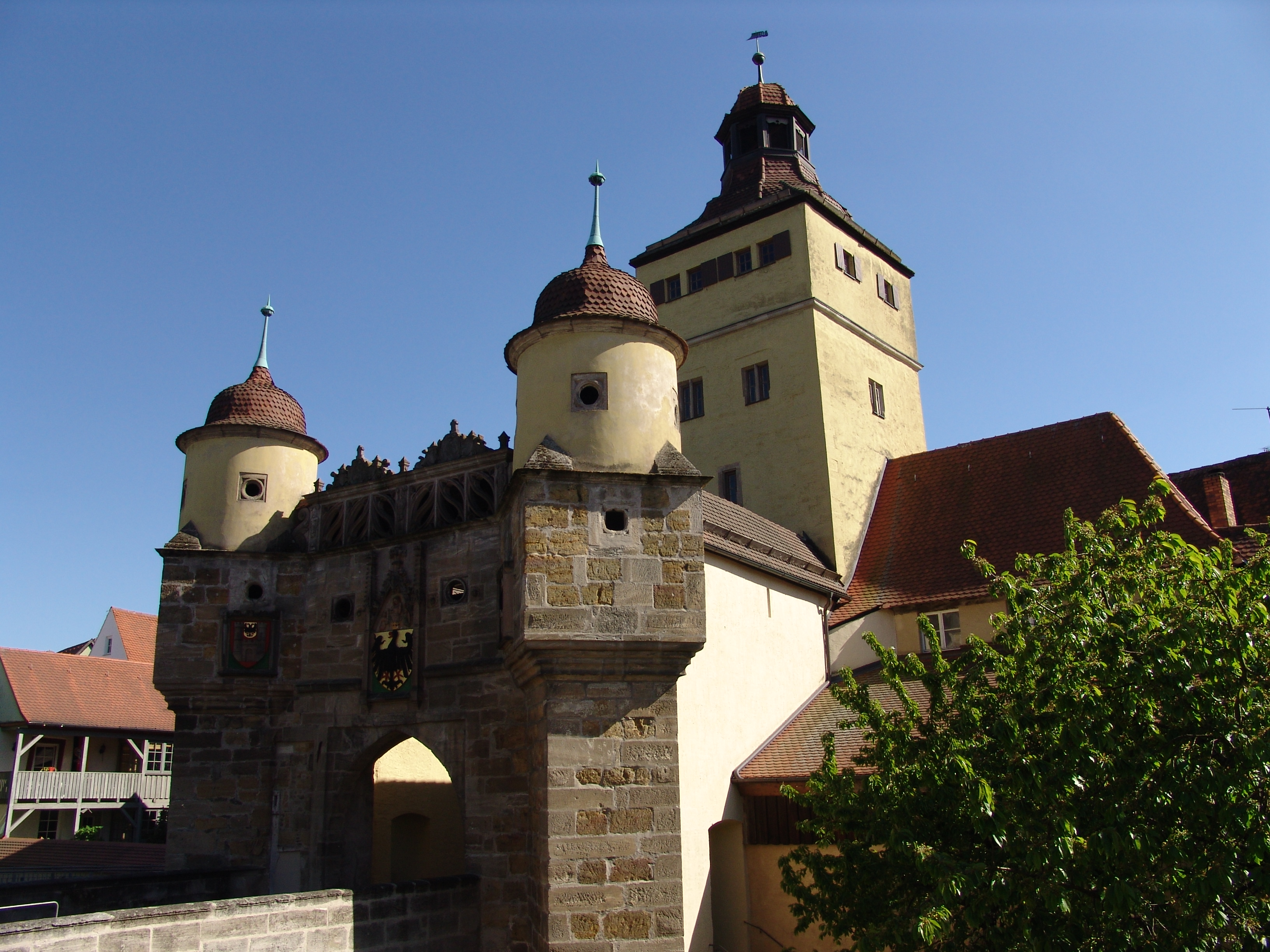
The gate

The Ellinger Tor is the most famous city gate of Weißenburg in Bayern, Germany. It is from the 14th century and is part of the medieval city wall of Weißenburg.

It was on a postage stamp of the Deutsche Bundespost in 1964 and 1967.
