= Peter North =

Peter North may refer to:

- Sir Peter North (legal scholar) (born 1936), English legal scholar
- Peter North (actor) (born 1957), Canadian pornographic actor, director, and producer
- Peter North (politician) (born 1960), Canadian politician
