= Alfred North =

Alfred North may refer to:

- Alfred John North (1855–1917), ornithologist
- Alfred North (water polo) (1906–1988), British water polo player
- Alfred North (jurist) (1900–1981), President of the Court of Appeal of New Zealand

== See also ==
- Alfred North Whitehead (1861–1947), mathematician
