= Christopher North (businessman) =

American businessman, CEO of Shutterfly

- Born: Christopher Corson North; October 1970 (age 55)
- Education: Harvard College; New York University
- Occupation: Businessman
- Title: CEO, Shutterfly

Christopher Corson North (born October 1970) is an American businessman, CEO of the online retailer Shutterfly.

North was born in October 1970. He has a bachelor's degree in economics from Harvard College and a master's degree in philosophy from New York University.

North started his career as a management consultant with Booz Allen Hamilton, in their media and entertainment division. Then he became vice president and general manager of Electronic Publishing for HarperCollins Publishers and then chief operating officer of HarperCollins Canada. After that, he was as global managing director at Phaidon Press.

He became Amazon UK CEO in January 2011, replacing Brian McBride (now chairman of ASOS.com), who stepped down from the role to undergo treatment for prostate cancer. In May 2016, he became CEO of online specialty photo retailer Shutterfly.

According to The Guardian, North is "one of the most powerful figures in British retail". The Evening Standard included North in its list of London's 1000 most influential people 2011, stating that "North is shaking up UK retailing".
