= Frances North =

American politician (1919–2003)

Member of the Washington House of Representatives from the 47th district
- In office 1973–1983
- Preceded by: Bud Shinpoch
- Succeeded by: Michael E. Patrick

Personal details
- Born: March 26, 1919
- Died: March 3, 2003 (aged 83)
- Party: Democratic
- Education: Seattle University

Frances Codiga North (March 26, 1919 – March 3, 2003) was an American politician who served in the Washington State House for the 47th district from 1973 to 1983.

== Life and career ==
North was born on March 26, 1919 to a Swiss-Italian immigrant father. She was a native of the Renton area and attended Seattle University before being elected to a town council position.

She served 10 years in the Washington House of Representatives. She died in 2003, from Parkinson's disease.

North died on March 3, 2003, at the age of 83.
