= Texas land survey system =

Texas, along with the original thirteen states and several others in the Southwest which were originally deeded with Spanish land grants, does not use the Public Land Survey System (also known as the Section Township Range and the Jeffersonian System). Land grants from the state of Texas to railroad companies were often patented in blocks and sections, and occasionally in units of square miles, officially considered sections.

The Texas Land Survey System is often measured in Spanish Customary Units. The most important of these is the vara, which, while ambiguous in the past, was legally established to be exactly 33 1/3 inches (846.67 mm) long in June 1919.

The subdivision levels in Texas are as follows:

== General subdivisions ==
1. State boundary
2. Railroad district (12 total, county boundaries)
3. County

In Texas, the highest level of land subdivision is the boundary of the state itself. Below this are the Texas railroad districts, of which there are 12. These are Spanish grants, surveyed on the "metes and bounds" system of measurement, and are of irregular shape and size.

Counties are contained within railroad districts, but township/section, block, and league/labor measurements are not required to follow county boundaries. This is because original measurement lines were drawn before county lines.

== Townships and sections (South Texas) ==
1. Township
2. Section

Townships and sections, only found in southern Texas, follow the same style as the Public Land Survey System but do not include ranges. Sections are numbered between 1 and 9,999, but can include fractions (as in 65.5)

== Blocks (West Texas) ==
1. Block
2. Tract

Blocks (groups of joined or non-joined subdivided surveyed land) are not restricted to rectangles or squares but based on survey layouts and individual property bounds. Original block lines were drawn before any official boundaries were created.

Tracts, found within blocks, are special categories.

Neither blocks nor tracts obey county lines.

== Leagues and labors (North and East Texas) ==
1. League (4,428.4 acres; 17.921 km^{2})
2. Labor (177.14 acres; 0.71684 km^{2})

When a league is subdivided, it is subdivided into 25 labors. Leagues can be divided or undivided (some leagues exist without labors). Labors cannot exist without leagues.

A labor is one million square varas. Therefore, a league is 25 million.

"A league and a labor" (4,605.5 acres; 18.638 km^{2}) was a common first land grant and consisted of a league of land away from the river plus one extra labor of good riparian (river-situated) land. A headright of this much land was granted to "all persons [heads of families] except Africans and their descendants and Indians living in Texas on the day of the declaration of independence." To any single man, 17 years or older, one-third league was granted (1,476.1 acres; 5.9737 km^{2}).
