= Marc Bogaerts =

Belgian choreographer and artistic director

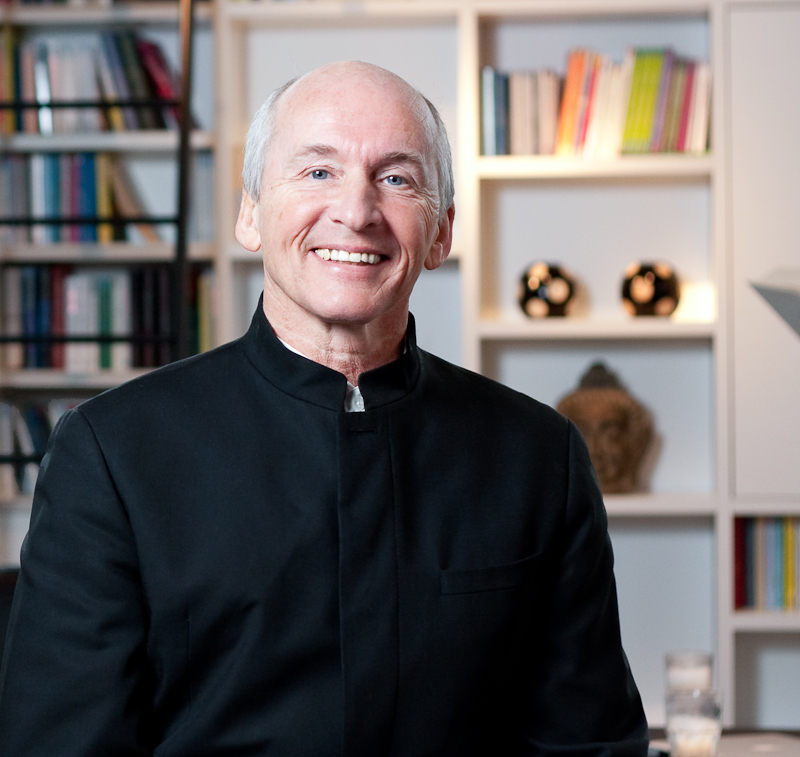
- Born: Antwerp, Belgium
- Education: The Royal Ballet of Flanders
- Known for: Theatre, Dance
- Notable work: Not strictly Rubens, Carmina Burana, The Emperor’s Dream
- Website: www.bogaertsproductions.net

Marc Bogaerts is a Belgian choreographer and artistic director living in Berlin. He has worked internationally for over more than 50 dance, opera and circus companies. Bogaerts' work features unusual symbiosis of unconventional combinations, such as modern dancers with athletes, circus artists with ballroom dancers, ice skaters with snake women, and breakdancers with classical dancers.

== Biography ==
Bogaerts studied Latin, Greek and philosophy with the Jesuits for seven years, which influenced his later work by integrated understanding of all sports, the unity of body and soul, as it was formulated by the ancient Greeks. In 1975 he started his career as a dancer and soon also as a choreographer with the Royal Ballet of Flanders. From 1982 to 1993 he resided in New York City, where he danced as an honorary guest performer with Merce Cunningham, Trisha Brown and Laura Dean, taught at the Actors Studio in New York and initiated numerous artistic social projects raising awareness about abortion, drugs and genocide. From New York he moved to Berlin. As the only choreographer working for all three opera houses in Berlin: Deutsche Oper Berlin, Staatsoper Unter den Linden, Komische Oper Berlin he created performances such as Carmina Burana, L’Histoire du Soldat or Four Seasons. He created a lot of social-cultural works worldwide with major involvement of youth. E.g. USA "Missing Persons" on human rights, or issues on abortion, drugabuse, terrorism each time touching the nerf of times without insulting or scandalizing, which for him is the easy way out. Living all around the world he finds inspiration for his interdisciplinary productions. At the moment creating a synthesis of sport and stage art is in the centre of his artistic work.
