= Tan Chong (disambiguation) =

Tan Chong (陈宗; born 1965) is a Malaysian politician from Segamat, Johor.

Tan Chong may also refer to:

== Businesses ==
- Tan Chong International Limited, Hong Kong based diversified conglomerate
- Tan Chong Motor, Malaysia-based multinational corporation

== People ==
- Ronald Tan Chong Ngee (1954/1955–1992), accomplice of Sim Ah Cheoh, Singaporean drug trafficker
- Tan Chong Tee (陈崇智; 1916–2012), Chinese resistance fighter
