= Tan Chong International Limited =

Hong-Kong based multi-industry investment holding company

- Logo of Tan Chong International Limited
- Company type: Public
- Traded as: SEHK: 693SGX: T15
- ISIN: BMG8667Z1023
- Industry: Automotive distribution; Industrial Equipment distribution; Logistics; Finance
- Founded: 19 March 1997; 28 years ago
- Founder: Tan Sri Tan Yuet Foh; Tan Sri Tan Kim Hor
- Headquarters: Hong Kong, China
- Area served: Singapore, Hong Kong, China, Japan, Taiwan, Thailand, Philippines, Cambodia, Myanmar, Indonesia, Brunei
- Key people: Tan Eng Soon (Chairman); Glenn Tan Chun Hong (M.D.)
- Revenue: ▼HK$12,698,567,000 (2024)
- Net income: ▲HK$609,487,000 (2024)
- Website: Official website

Tan Chong International Limited (SEHK: 693SGX: T15 ), also known as TCIL, is a Hong Kong based diversified conglomerate. Incorporated in Bermuda on March 19, 1997, the company concurrently listed on the Singapore Exchange and the Hong Kong Stock Exchange. The company's operations span vehicle retail and distribution, finance, property, and transportation.

Tan Chong International Limited is an independent holding company as a result of restructuring and spin-off of non-Malaysian operations from Tan Chong Motor Holdings Berhad in 1997. Although the company's automotive businesses in ASEAN countries currently overlap with those of Tan Chong Motor, the two entities are not affiliated.

== History ==
=== Foundation ===
The roots of Tan Chong International Limited can be traced back to 1957, under the business units of Tan Chong Motor Holdings Berhad (TCMH). To adapt to changes in the business market, TCMH underwent a major business unbundling and restructuring in the 1990s (up until 1999). This resulted in the spin-off of four independent listed entities:

- Tan Chong Motor Holdings Berhad (responsible for domestic automotive manufacturing and sales in Malaysia)
- APM Automotive Holdings Berhad (involved in automotive parts)
- Warisan TC Holdings Berhad (managing non-automotive businesses like heavy machinery, interior decorations, and car rental)
- Tan Chong International Limited (TCIL) (handling all overseas automotive sales operations as of the restructuring)

Since no new shares were issued, Tan Chong International was listed by way of introduction on the Hong Kong Stock Exchange with the counter 693 and the Singapore Exchange with the counter T15 on July 7, 1998.

TCIL's Singapore headquarters are located at the Tan Chong Motor Centre, 911 Bukit Timah Road. Its Hong Kong headquarters are at Unit 3001, 30th Floor, Shui On Centre, 6-8 Harbour Road, Wan Chai, Hong Kong. Additionally, TCIL established Taiwan Motor Image Co., Ltd. in 2007 to import and distribute Subaru vehicles from Japan into Taiwan.

=== Recent Developments ===
Tan Chong International Limited continues to make strategic adjustments to its business. For example, in 2009, the company acquired a truck manufacturing plant in Thailand for the production and distribution of Fuso trucks. They also invested in an automotive parts factory in Nanjing, China, to enhance their seat manufacturing capabilities. More recently, the group has focused on asset optimization, including the potential sale or long-term lease of its automotive manufacturing plant in Thailand (with automotive production expected to cease by the end of 2024). They are also committed to expanding their equipment and car rental businesses in China and Singapore, respectively.
