= Tan Chong Motor =

Automobile manufacturer

Tan Chong Motor Holdings Berhad
- Tan Chong Motor Holdings Berhad corporate logo
- Type: Public limited company
- Traded as: MYX: 4405
- ISIN: MYL4405OO006
- Industry: Automotive
- Founded: 14 October 1972; 53 years ago
- Founder: Tan Kim Hor & Tan Yuet Foh
- Headquarters: Kuala Lumpur, Malaysia
- Area served: Malaysia, Vietnam, Myanmar, Laos, Cambodia, Thailand, Philippines
- Key people: Tan Heng Chew (President)
- Revenue: ▲RM3.05 billion (2022)
- Net income: ▼RM51 million (2022)
- Website: Official website

Tan Chong Motor Holdings Berhad (MYX: 4405), also known as the TCMH Group or Tan Chong Motor (TCM), is a Malaysia-based multinational corporation that is active in automobile assembly, manufacturing, distribution and sales, but is best known as the franchise holder of Nissan vehicles in Malaysia. The company was founded in 1957 by two Malaysian entrepreneurs, Tan Yuet Foh and Tan Kim Hor, with ambitions of importing and selling Datsun cars from Japan. Tan Chong Motor Holdings Berhad was incorporated on 14 October 1972, and in 1974, the company was listed on the Kuala Lumpur Stock Exchange.

Tan Chong Motor Assemblies Sdn. Bhd. (TCMA), a subsidiary of the TCMH Group commenced automobile assembly operations in 1976 at its plant in Segambut, Kuala Lumpur. The TCMH Group later constructed a second plant in Serendah, Selangor (2007), a third plant in Da Nang, Vietnam (2013), a fourth plant in Bago, Myanmar (2016), a fifth plant in Da Nang, Vietnam (2018) and a sixth plant in Bangkok, Thailand (2019).

The TCMH Group also holds the franchise rights for UD Trucks, Renault and Foton Motor in Malaysia, as well as for Nissan vehicles in Vietnam, Cambodia, Laos and Myanmar respectively. TCMH also owns subsidiaries that are active in property holdings and financial services.

Tan Chong Motor Holdings Berhad (TCMH) is not to be confused with Tan Chong International Limited (TCIL), a separate Hong Kong–based holding company that was created in 1998 under a demerger initiated by the TCMH Group.

== History ==
=== 1950s – Birth ===
The Tan Chong story began in 1957, the same year Malaya became independent from British colonial rule, and 12 years after the end of World War II. The late Tan Yuet Foh, founder of Tan Chong Motor, was an enterprising taxi driver in Kuala Lumpur. In 1957, Tan heard news of a visit from the President of Datsun to the newly established Japanese embassy in Malaya. Without the luxury of powerful connections or a means to contact the President, he waited outside the embassy gates for the President's arrival. His perseverance and tenacity was rewarded when the President granted Tan the franchise rights to Datsun vehicles, and it is said that his words to the President were "Just give me the chance to sell a few cars and I’ll show you what we can do". Tan Yuet Foh would later enlist the help of Tan Kim Hor, and together the Tan brothers formed Tan Chong & Sons Motor Co. Ltd.. Nissan/Datsun became the first Japanese marque to be imported and sold officially in Malaysia. The Tan brothers had no prior experience of selling cars, but in their first year of business they sold 39 cars from a shop lot in Jalan Ipoh, Kuala Lumpur.

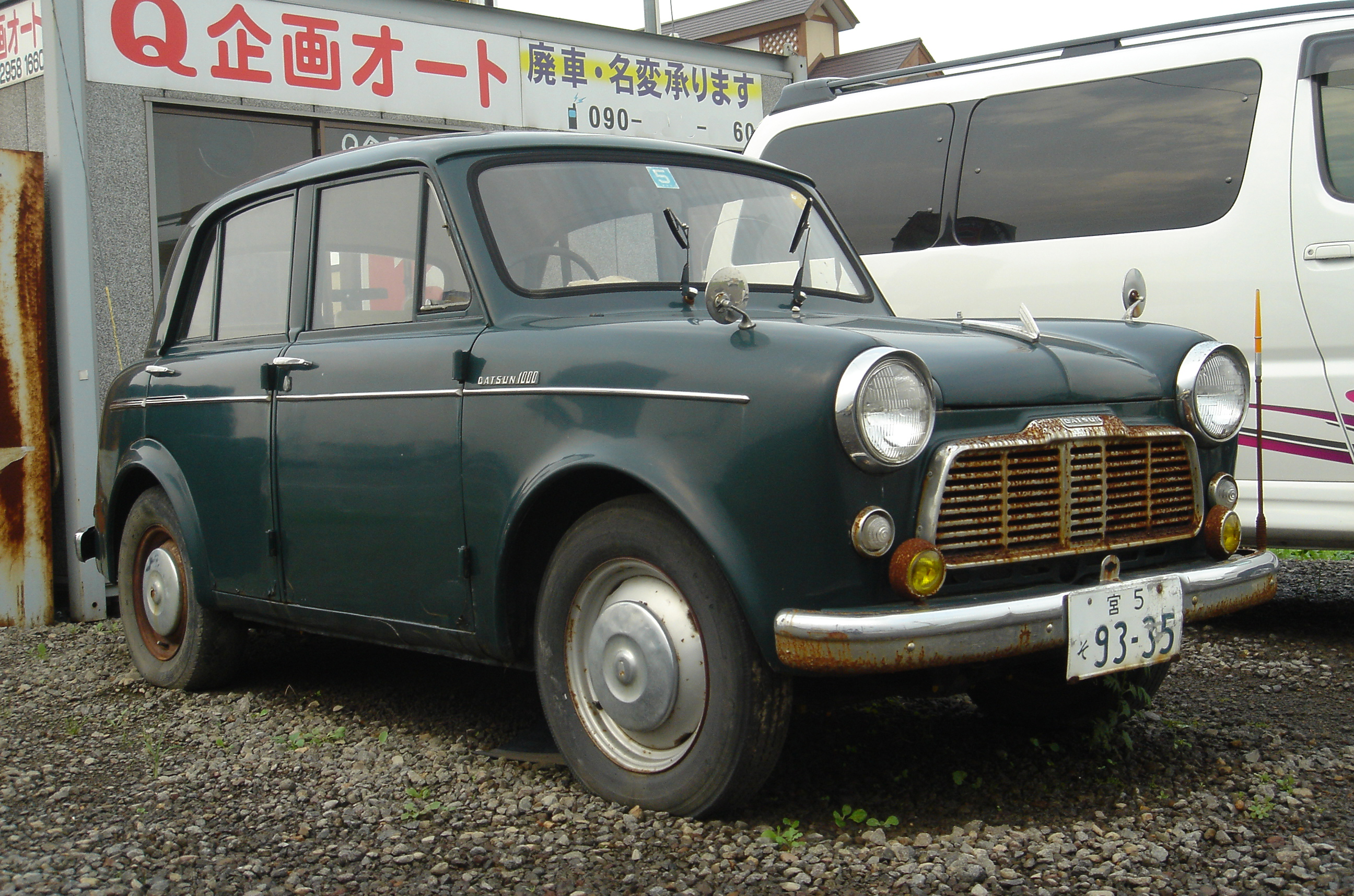
The Datsun 1000 was among the earliest Japanese cars to arrive in Malaysia.

During the 1950s and 1960s, Malaya was a largely agricultural nation reliant on tin, rubber and palm oil exports. The automotive market was relatively small as only the wealthy could afford cars in major cities like Kuala Lumpur, Penang and Ipoh. The market was dominated by British, European, American and Australian cars, as Malayans had long been accustomed to Western cars with the first models arriving as early as the late 19th century. Initially, Japanese cars were not popular when they arrived in the 1950s, and they were perceived as inferior to their Western counterparts. The lightness and thin construction of the cheap Japanese cars drew criticism, and popularised the derogatory term, 'Milo tin' in the 1960s. The term came about when, according to an industry veteran from that time, a workshop had repaired damaged body panels on a Japanese car with scrap metal from old tins, including Milo tins, and it was possible that the repainting was improperly done and the wording underneath was visible. Since then, the term 'Milo tin' has come to be used against cars with poor build quality or questionable safety credentials. In addition to the quality concerns, anti-Japanese sentiment was still strong in 1960s Malaysia, owing to bitter memories from the Japanese occupation during World War 2. Undeterred by the discouraging comments, the Tan brothers figured that if nobody bought the cars, they could still use them for other purposes.

=== 1960s – Growth ===
By the 1960s, the Malaysian government began to emphasise industrialisation, then viewed as a more dependable economic sector for employment and economic growth. Malaysia had previously assembled a small number of cars and trucks, but the vast majority were imports. In May 1964, the Malaysian government enacted a policy to encourage the local assembly of vehicles and manufacturing of automotive components, as per the recommendation of experts from the Colombo Plan. The new policy made imported completely built up (CBU) cars more expensive through the addition of import duties, and licenses were issued to various car companies who were interested in setting up local assembly plants. Cars that were locally assembled with Malaysian manufactured components would be granted a reduction in import duties, making them cheaper and more competitive as a result. The government would later ban the import of CBU cars altogether and instead, importers were required to obtain Approved Permits (AP) to legally import and sell CBU cars.

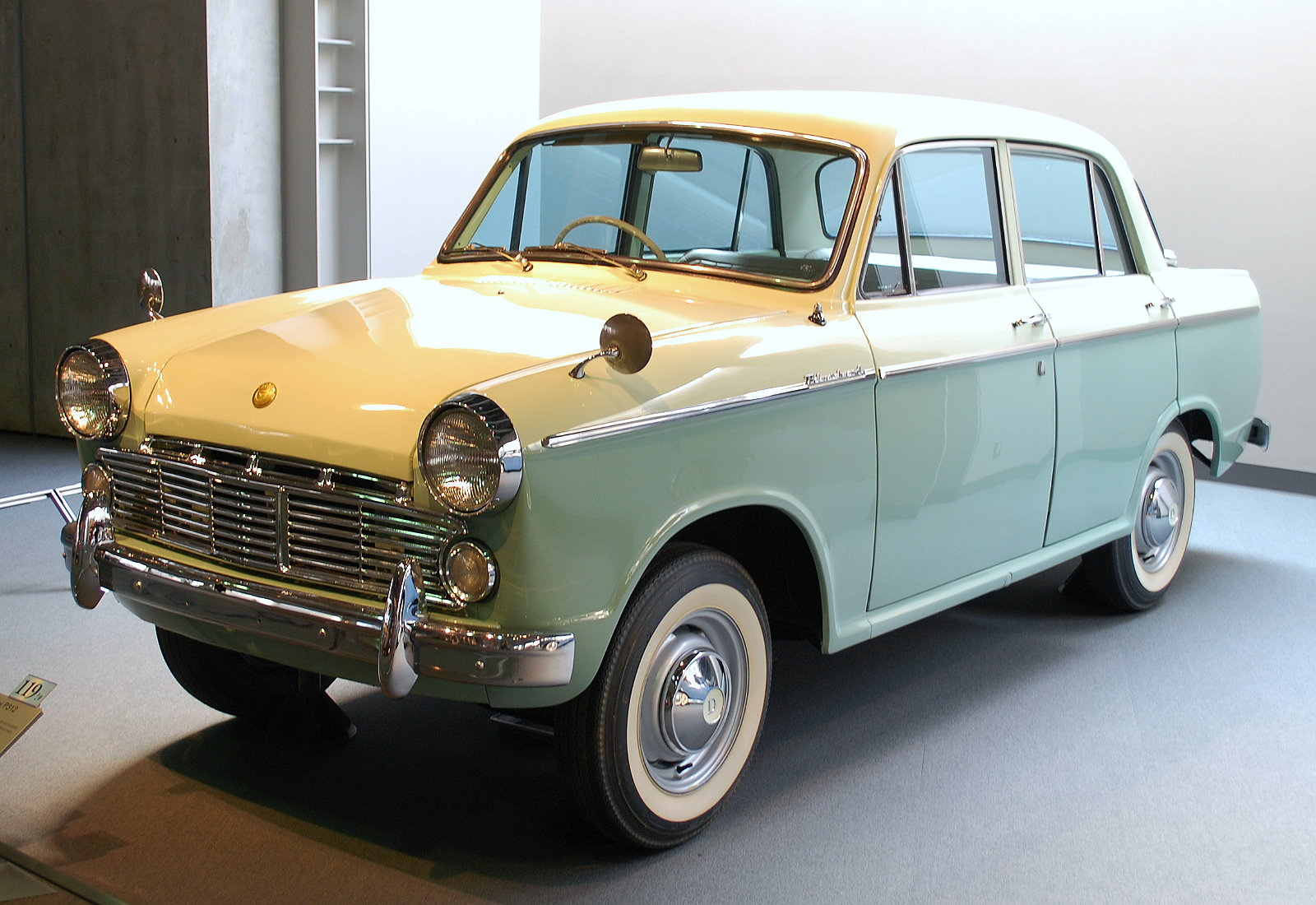
The Datsun Bluebird/310 was popularly used for taxis.

Nissan/Datsun responded to the government's call for industrialisation by exporting completely knocked down (CKD) kits from Japan to Malaysia, where they were assembled at the newly constructed Capital Motor Assembly plant in Tampoi, Johor. Several Datsun engineers assisted in the training of the local employees on technical skills at the plant. The first Malaysian-assembled Datsun rolled off the factory floor in June 1968. Prices for the locally assembled Datsuns were reduced and sales improved significantly in the following years. However, in 1971, Capital Motor Assembly was sold to General Motors, and Datsun production was shifted to the Swedish Motor Assemblies (SMA) plant in Shah Alam, Selangor.

=== 1970s – Zenith ===
The 1970s was a prosperous decade for Tan Chong Motor, and it marked the first major turning point in the company's history. In 1970, Datsun became the best-selling brand of car in the Malaysian market. Despite the initial struggles and scepticism, the Tan brothers had succeeded in establishing Datsun as a household name. The dominance of long standing European brands had greatly diminished by the 70s, in contrast with the rapid rise in demand for Japanese cars. In addition to Tan Chong Motor's efforts, the newfound success of Datsun in Malaysia was also attributed to the affordable pricing, high reliability and admirable fuel efficiency of the Datsun vehicles themselves, selling propositions which many of its European competitors of that period could not match. For those reasons, Datsuns were widely used as taxis and many continued in service well into the 1990s.

The greatest threat to Datsun's dominance in the Malaysian market came from another Japanese brand, Toyota. Like Datsun, Toyota had also embarked on a similar approach in its marketing, offering affordable, reliable and fuel efficient vehicles for the masses. Both Toyota and Datsun battled fiercely for pole position in the Malaysian market, often just fractions apart in total market share. In 1974, Toyota captured 15.96% of the Peninsular Malaysian market, while Datsun managed 15.67%, and in 1975, Toyota and Datsun captured 14.97% and 14.85% respectively. Nonetheless, Datsun successfully fended off Toyota for most of the 1970s and early 80s, making Malaysia one of the few markets in the world where Datsun beat Toyota. Datsun's upper management in Tokyo were highly supportive of Tan Chong Motor's efforts, and Tan Yuet Foh was highly respected among Datsun's executives. TCM often had the upper hand when negotiating pricing and specifications for Malaysian-market Datsuns.

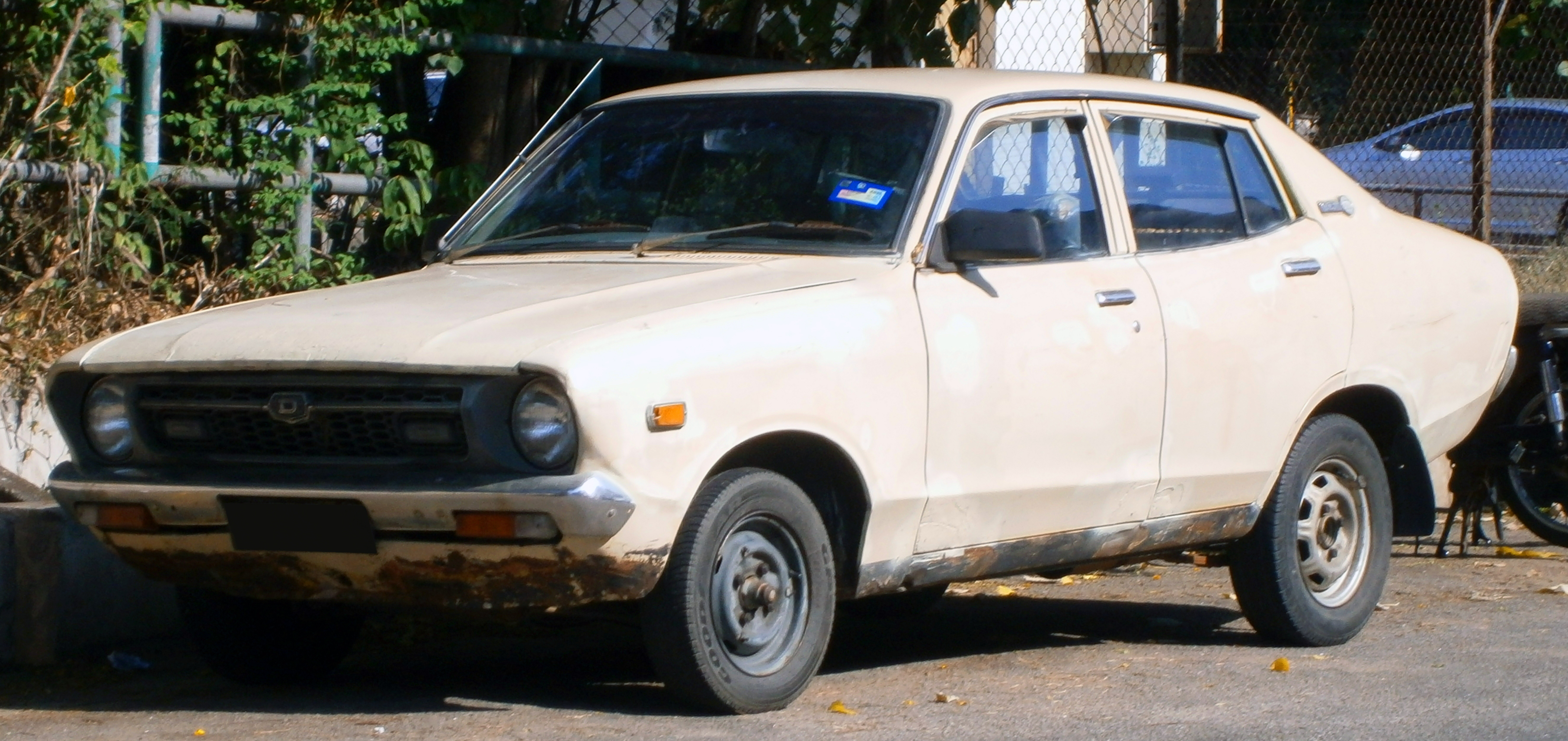
The Datsun 120Y was a best-seller in Malaysia.

With growing demand for Datsun cars in the 1970s, the Tan brothers considered the possibility of constructing their own assembly plant. Prior to 1976, Tan Chong Motor had to rely on third parties for the local assembly of their popular Datsun vehicles. The prospect of a new Malaysian plant was welcomed by Datsun's top executives, and it was decided that the plant would be constructed in Segambut, on the outskirts of Kuala Lumpur. Datsun's engineers would contribute to the plant's design, and its overall layout would mirror the prestigious Datsun Zama plant, while a separate subsidiary, Tan Chong Motor Assemblies Sdn. Bhd. (TCMA) would handle plant operations. Advanced manufacturing techniques would also be incorporated, including the electro-dipping (ED) system of applying primer to car bodies, in which the entire bodyshell of a car is electrically charged and immersed in a tank of primer paint, ensuring that every bit of bare metal is covered and safeguarded against rust. At the time, TCMA's plant was the nation's first to implement this technology. In 1976, the new plant commenced operations, and the first Datsun from TCMA was flagged off by Tan Yuet Foh in an official ceremony. The following year, TCMA began assembling Datsun Diesel trucks and buses, and by 1980, locally manufactured parts for TCMA's models had grown to include shock absorbers, leaf springs, tyres, glass, batteries, seat belts and wiring harnesses among others.

=== 1980s – Depression ===
The 1980s was a challenging period and marked a second major turning point in Tan Chong Motor's history. By the 80s, the Malaysian government had realized that their 1964 policy on the local assembly of vehicles and manufacturing of automotive components had not resulted in technology transfer as originally envisioned. Prices of new cars in Malaysia had inflated significantly by the early 80s, with most if not all locally assembled CKD models generally costing more to produce than an equivalent CBU import. The inflation of car prices was attributed to a number of factors, including low efficiency and inadequate economies of scale among the parts manufacturers and assembly plants, the government's mandatory CKD deletion policy, high import and excise taxes for the CKD models, and various others. Additionally, the automotive industry in Malaysia was held back by a small domestic market, and manufacturers primarily served domestic demand and did not emphasise exports, thus limiting the growth and competitiveness of the industry as a whole.

Not content with the state of the nation's automotive industry, the government concluded that direct involvement was necessary to reverse losses and spur future industrial growth. The National Car Project was drafted in the early 80s with the objective of accelerating technology transfer, increasing and rationalising local content, and involving more bumiputera entrepreneurs in the then largely ethnic Chinese dominated automotive industry. The National Car Project would lead to the founding of Perusahaan Otomobil Nasional Sdn. Bhd. (Proton) in May 1983, and the launch of the Proton Saga in July 1985. The new Proton cars were assembled in a dedicated plant in Shah Alam and were exempt from import duties on the CKD packs, allowing them to be priced below the popular Japanese cars of the time such as the Datsun Sunny and Toyota Corolla. However, the Malaysian economy and automotive industry went into depression in the mid 80s, and the Japanese yen began to appreciate, driving up new car prices even further. The combination of the various factors above witnessed sales of new Datsun cars plummeting 90% to an average of 300 units a month in 1986. The Tan brothers' businesses were severely affected, and the latter half of the 1980s witnessed large revamps and restructuring in the Tan Chong group. Datsun/Nissan would never again reclaim their title of Malaysia's best-selling car brand, as Proton and later Perodua would occupy and monopolise Tan Chong Motor's traditional budget car segment in the following years.

=== 1990s – Rationalisation ===
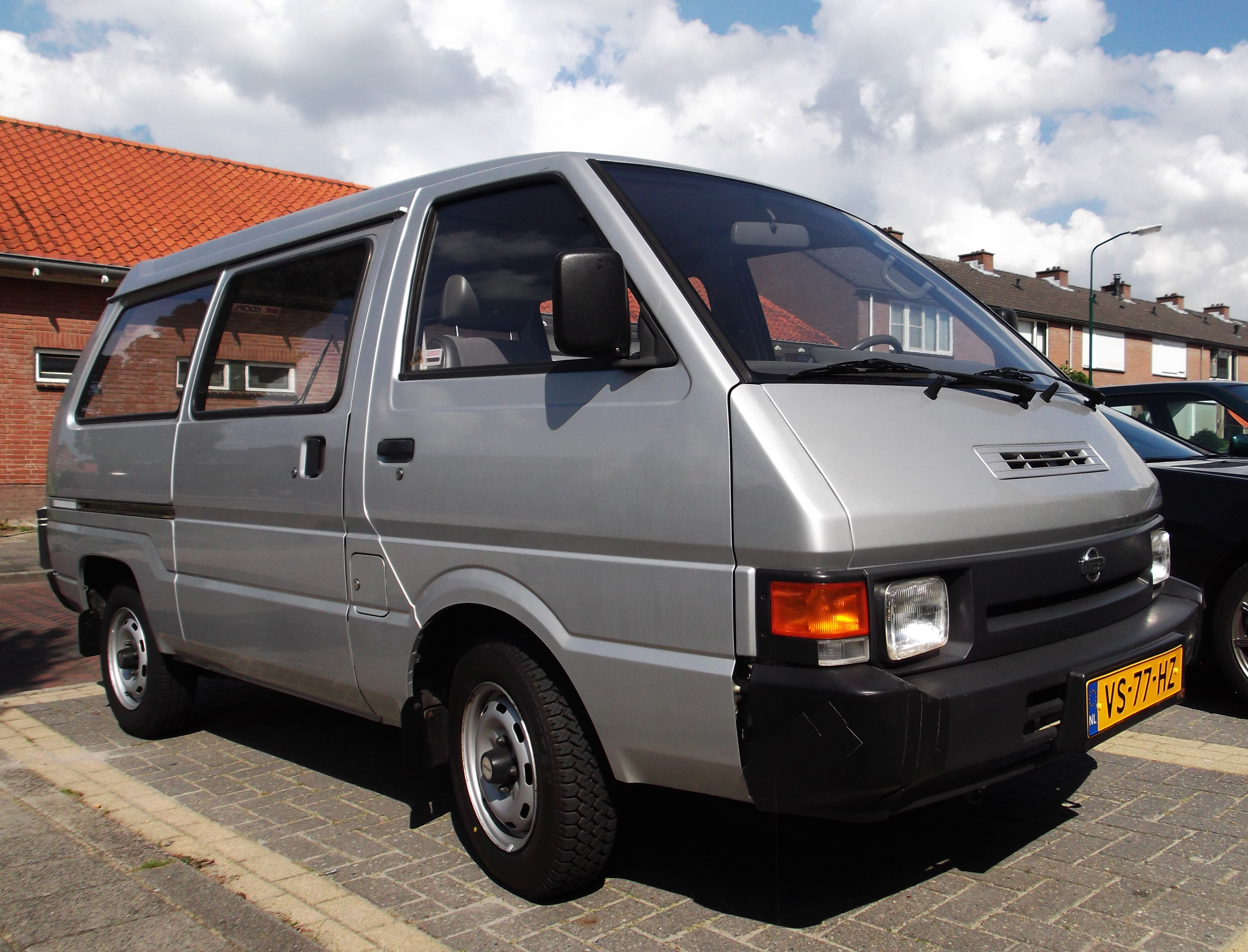
The Nissan Vanette became TCMA's first export model.

By the 1990s, Tan Chong Motor had bounced back and rationalised their assets and resources. The reduction in sales caused by the dominance of the new Proton Saga, which had captured 85% of the market's sub-1.6 litre segment by 1987, a segment which the Datsun/Nissan 120Y had long dominated, had inadvertently steered Tan Chong Motor to move upmarket and explore export opportunities. Prior to 1994, all Malaysian-assembled Datsun/Nissan cars were sold locally. However, in November 1989, Tan Chong Motor expressed intentions to export their Nissan vehicles to neighbouring ASEAN countries, such as Singapore and Brunei.

At the time, Nissan Japan held Tan Chong Motor Assemblies with high regard, and the Malaysian plant was regarded as the third best Nissan foreign assembly plant in the world, behind the United States and the United Kingdom. TCMA had also pioneered women's rights in the traditionally male dominated Malaysian automotive industry, with as many as 44% of the assembly workforce in 1989 being female. The female employees were treated no different from the males, and many carried out heavy tasks like welding, wet-sanding and polishing, as well as fixing doors, bumpers and engine parts among others. In the 1980s, most local and even global automobile assembly plants did not employ women, with only a few exceptions in Sweden and West Germany, as well as the TCMA plant itself. By late 1989, the TCMA plant was producing 31 different models, including contract assembly for non-Nissan models from Subaru, Audi and Volkswagen. TCMA also became the nation's first plant to feature an engine assembly line in December 1988. The 1989 Nissan Sentra became the first car to be sold with a Malaysian-assembled engine, ahead of the Proton Saga, as Proton only commenced engine assembly operations in June 1989. Later in 1993, the plant became the first in Southeast Asia to be ISO 9002 certified.

In December 1994, Nissan Japan would finally permit Tan Chong Motor to export the Malaysian-assembled Nissan Vanette to Papua New Guinea, TCM's first export market. The arrangement made TCM the first company to export ASEAN-assembled Nissan vehicles. TCM would later export the Vanette to Fiji, Bangladesh and Brunei, while exports of Vanette spare parts to Nissan Japan commenced in November 1996. Additionally, TCMA was also tasked with assisting local assembly operations at Pakistan-based Ghandhara Nissan. The company was awarded the contract because Nissan Japan had recognised TCMA's abilities in small-scale, diverse assembly of vehicles. The TCMH Group also supplied various parts for non-Nissan models, including the popular Proton Saga and Perodua Kancil. Tan Chong Motor continued to greatly influence the Malaysian automotive industry through its parts manufacturing division, APM Automotive Holdings Berhad (APM).

=== 2000s – Diversification ===
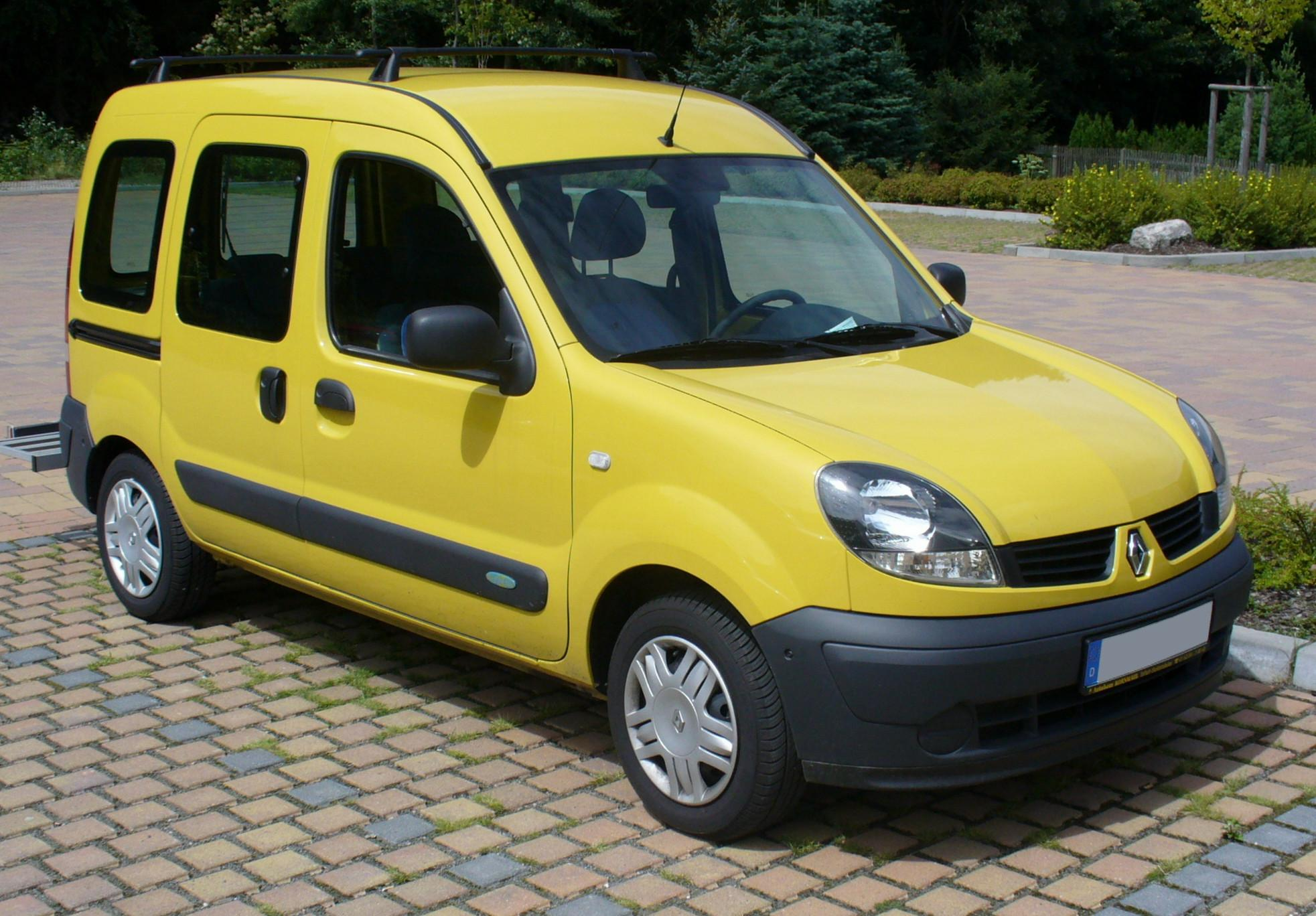
The Renault Kangoo. Malaysia was Renault's production hub in Southeast Asia.

The 2000s was a decade of diversification in the Tan Chong Motor portfolio. Since its founding, the Tan Chong name had become synonymous with Datsun and Nissan vehicles in Malaysia, but in mid-2003, the company adopted the Renault brand in line with the Renault–Nissan Alliance. A new subsidiary, TC Euro Cars Sdn. Bhd. (TCEC) was created to market, distribute and provide after-sale services for Malaysian-market Renault cars. The Renault brand was handled by Quasar Carriage Sdn. Bhd. prior to the advent of TCEC. Additionally, local assembly of the Renault Kangoo commenced in 2004 at TCMA's Segambut plant, and Renault's upper management in France would later designate Malaysia as their ASEAN manufacturing hub.

Ground breaking for a second TCMA assembly plant in Serendah, Selangor took place on 28 February 2006. Tan Chong Motor/Nissan is the only non-national badged automobile company to simultaneously operate two Malaysian assembly plants, and at the time, it was the second company to claim that distinction, with the first being Proton and their 2003 Tanjung Malim plant. The new Serendah plant boosted Tan Chong Motor's production capacity, and incorporated advanced manufacturing technology under the Nissan Production Way (NPW). The original 1976 Segambut plant had become outdated by the 2000s, as its layout did not readily allow the use of modern manufacturing processes like modular assembly. Additionally, the location of the old plant had become impractical as congestion in Kuala Lumpur had grown significantly since the 1970s. The Nissan Latio became the first model to roll off Tan Chong Motor's new Serendah plant in 2007.

=== 2010s – Expansion ===
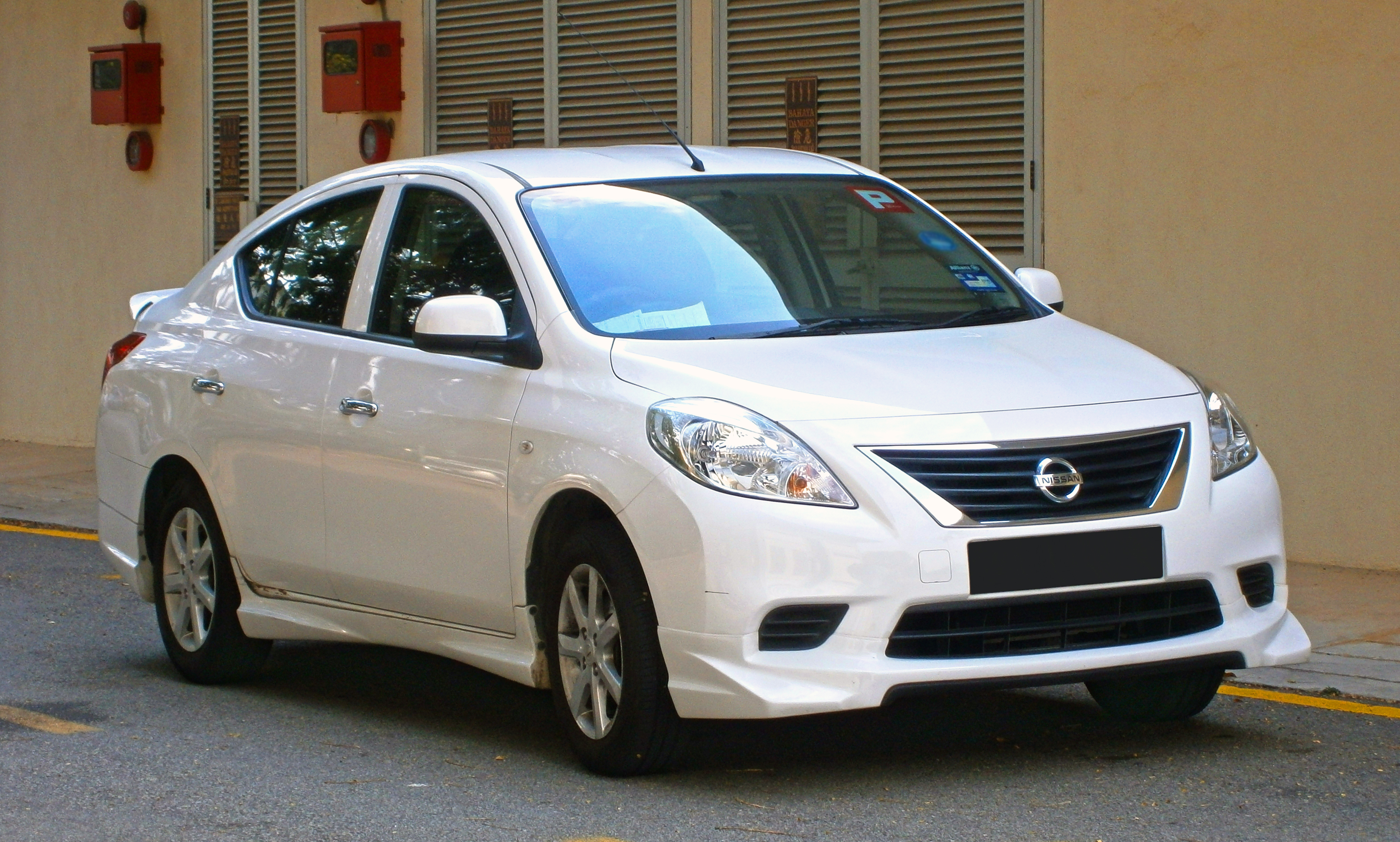
The Nissan Almera in Malaysia. The TCMH Group assembled the car in Malaysia (TCMA) and Vietnam (TCIEV).

The first half of the 2010s witnessed Tan Chong Motor's expansion into Indochina. The company has long since identified Vietnam as a country with vast opportunity for growth with regards to automobile sales. In 1995, four partners, Danang Auto Mechanical Engineering Factory, Marubeni, Nissan Japan and the Tan Chong Group had jointly drafted plans for a Vietnamese Nissan assembly plant, with construction scheduled for mid-1997. However, the opening of the Vietnamese plant was postponed indefinitely as a result of the 1997 Asian financial crisis. A decade-and-a-half later, the TCMH Group finally opened their Vietnamese plant in Da Nang, the Group's first international plant, with the first left-hand drive Nissan Sunny models rolling off the factory floor on 11 June 2013. TCIE Vietnam Pte. Ltd. (TCIEV), a wholly owned subsidiary of the TCMH Group handles the manufacturing of Nissan vehicles in Vietnam, while Nissan Vietnam Co. Ltd. (NVL), a joint venture between Nissan Japan and the TCMH Group handles the marketing, distribution and provisioning of after-sale services for Vietnamese-market Nissan cars. NVL also offers fully imported CBU cars in addition to their CKD Sunny.

Tan Chong Motor was also awarded the franchise rights to Nissan vehicles in neighbouring Laos and Cambodia in 2010. Tan Chong Motor (Cambodia) Pty. Ltd. and Tan Chong Motor (Lao) Co., Ltd. handle the marketing, distribution and provisioning of after-sale services for Cambodian-market and Laotian-market Nissan cars respectively. However, all Nissan vehicles in Cambodia and Laos are fully imported CBU models. Previously, Nissan Japan had appointed Denmark-based Kjaer Group to handle the Nissan brand in Vietnam, Laos and Cambodia since 2004, but the franchise rights would later transition to the Tan Chong Group towards the end of that decade.

In July 2013, Nissan Japan would once again award Tan Chong Motor the franchise rights for Nissan vehicles in Myanmar, and in August that same year, the Myanmar Investment Commission granted TCMH a license to manufacture vehicles in the Bago industrial area. Tan Chong Motor (Myanmar) Co., Ltd., a wholly owned subsidiary of the TCMH Group will manufacture Burmese-market Nissan vehicles, while ETCM (Myanmar) Co., Ltd., also a wholly owned subsidiary currently handles the marketing, distribution and provisioning of after-sale services respectively. The plant is scheduled to be completed in 2018 and the Nissan Sunny will be the first model to be locally assembled for the Burmese market.

Infiniti, Nissan's luxury division was officially imported into Malaysia in October 2011 by Inspired Motor Sdn. Bhd., a joint venture between Edaran Tan Chong Motor Sdn. Bhd. (ETCM) and Auto Dunia Sdn. Bhd., in which ETCM holds a 74% stake. All Malaysian-market Infinitis are fully imported (CBU), and neither Tan Chong Motor nor Infiniti have announced any plans for local assembly.

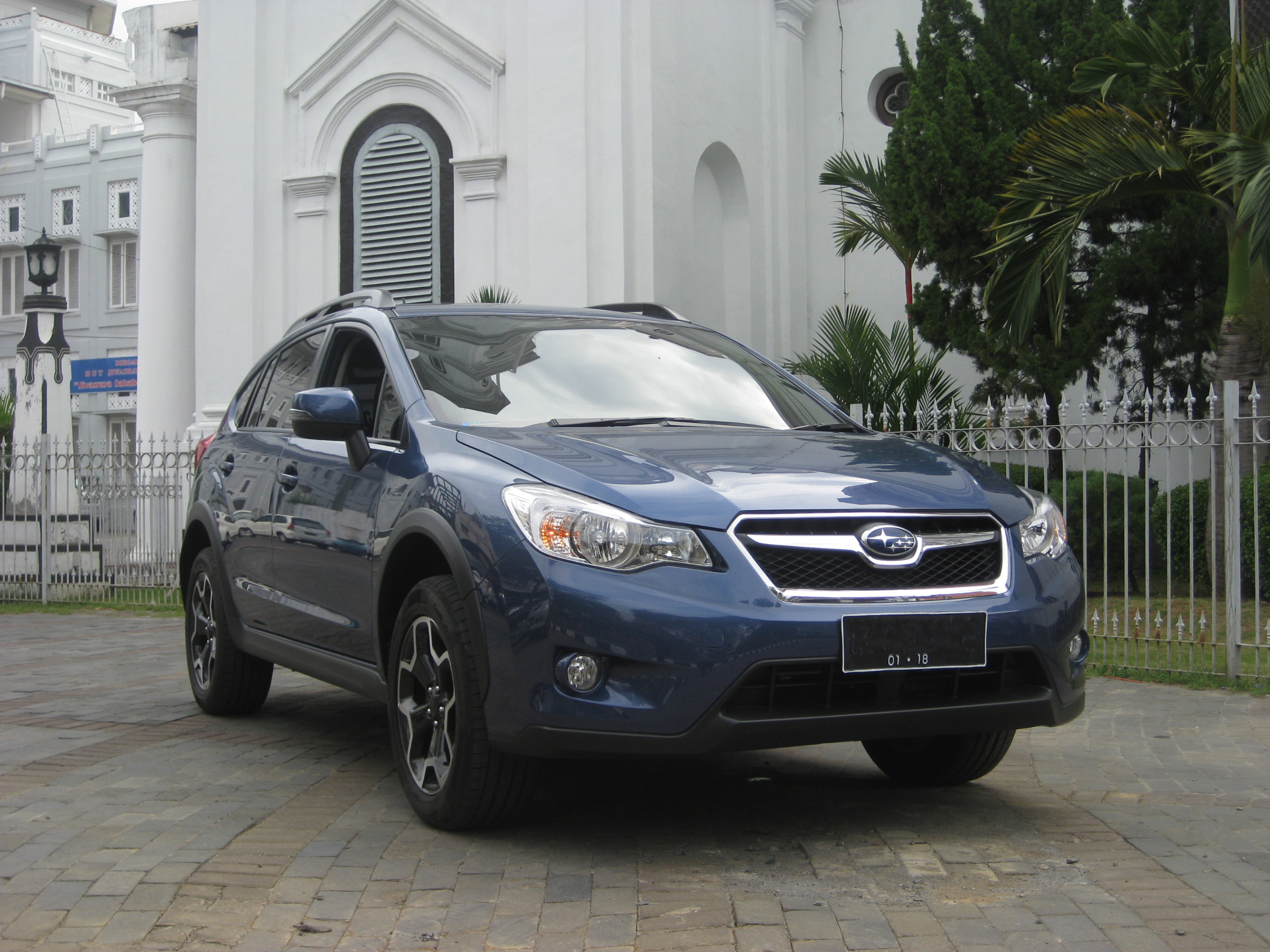
The Subaru XV in Indonesia. TCMA exported the XV to Indonesia and Thailand from 2012.

Tan Chong Motor also handled production and sales for Subaru cars throughout Southeast Asia. In July 2011, Fuji Heavy Industries (FHI) awarded Tan Chong Group the right to manufacture Subaru vehicles, making Malaysia the Southeast Asian production hub for Subaru. The first vehicle produced was the Subaru XV in late 2012. Produced in Tan Chong Motor Assemblies (TCMA), the XV had the production target of 6,500 units per year, with 70 percent allocated for the export market. Tan Chong Motor subsidiary, Motor Image handled the distribution and sales for Subaru cars in Malaysia, Indonesia, Singapore, Thailand, and Philippines.

In 2013, the Indonesian authorities investigated a potential tax evasion for the Subaru cars imported to the country by PT Tan Chong Subaru as an importer and PT Motor Image Indonesia, subsidiary of Tan Chong Motor as the distributor of Subaru in Indonesia. PT TC Subaru as registered all the imported cars as a front-wheel drive cars, while in the reality most Subaru cars imported was an all-wheel drive, which is liable for extra luxury taxes. The Indonesian government lost 1.5 trillion IDR due to the violation, which TC Subaru was ordered to pay before 15 August 2014. PT TC Subaru requested an appeal, which was rejected by the North Jakarta High Court on 11 April 2016. In October 2016, the authorities suspended import rights for Motor Image Indonesia. After several disputes, TC Subaru assets was successfully seized by the government, including buildings and hundreds of unsold cars which was then auctioned. As the result, TC Subaru and Motor Image Indonesia ceased to operate in the country, leaving Indonesia without the Subaru brand until its return in 2021 handled by PT Plaza Auto Mega.

In 2019, Tan Chong Motor officially launched its first assembly facility in Thailand, Tan Chong Subaru Automotive (Thailand) Ltd. (TCSAT). TC Manufacturing and Assembly Thailand owned a majority share of 74.9%, while Subaru Corporation holds the remaining 25.1%. It is Subaru Corporation's third factory in the world after its Gunma site in Japan and Subaru of Indiana Automotive in the United States. The fifth-generation Subaru Forester is the first model to be assembled at TCSAT, with the production target of 6,000 units a year.

The Tan Chong Group has also expanded and experimented with the motorcycle market in Indochina. In January 2012, Tan Chong Motorcycles (Laos) Co., Ltd was granted the distributorship rights by Vietnam Manufacturing and Export Processing Co., Ltd., a subsidiary of Taiwan-based Sanyang Motor Co., Ltd., to market SYM motorcycles in Laos. The distributorship agreement was later terminated in September 2013 following poor sales performance. Additionally, the TCMH Group signed a distributorship agreement with Kawasaki Heavy Industries Ltd. in December 2014 to distribute and sell CBU Kawasaki motorcycles, spare parts and accessories in Vietnam through their subsidiary, TC Motorcycles (Vietnam) Co., Ltd.

As of Q1 2016, Tan Chong Nissan had overtaken arch rival UMW Toyota after years of playing second fiddle, which means Nissan at the time was the fourth best-selling car brand in Malaysia, after Perodua, Proton and Honda.

=== 2020s and COVID-19 ===
Tan Chong Motor's was affected by the pandemic due to restriction and movement control order (MCO). Since then, the company continue to recover and make a comeback with rivals and competitors such as Sime Darby, Hap Seng, Perodua and Proton.

To strengthen its business portfolio, Tan Chong Motor Group has strategically diversified beyond the automotive sector by investing in renewable energy. Through a consortium comprising Tan Chong Motor Holdings Berhad, APM Automotive Holdings Berhad, and TC Warisan, the Group was awarded the development of a 20 MWac Large-Scale Solar Photovoltaic (LSSPV) Project under Cycle 4 (LSS@MEnTARI) by the Energy Commission of Malaysia. The project is undertaken under a 21-year Power Purchase Agreement (PPA) with an option for a further 4-year extension, supporting Malaysia's transition towards cleaner and more sustainable energy.

The LSS4 floating solar photovoltaic project is located on Serendah Lake, adjacent to Tan Chong Motor Assemblies (TCMA) Serendah. Throughout the planning, development, and operation of the project, Tan Chong Group has complied with all applicable regulations set by the authorities.

The floating solar project is expected to generate sufficient renewable electricity to power approximately 350 to 450 average Malaysian homes for an entire month, or around 11,000 to 13,000 homes for a single day. Beyond its renewable energy contribution, the initiative reflects Tan Chong Group's long-term commitment to sustainability, supporting the company's environmental goals while strengthening its track record in sustainable manufacturing and responsible business practices.

Moving forward, continued engagement with the local community through open communication and regular updates can help address residents' concerns, build mutual understanding, and reinforce confidence in the project's environmental and social commitments.

== Production facilities ==
=== Serendah, Hulu Selangor, Selangor, Malaysia ===
Current production

Nissan

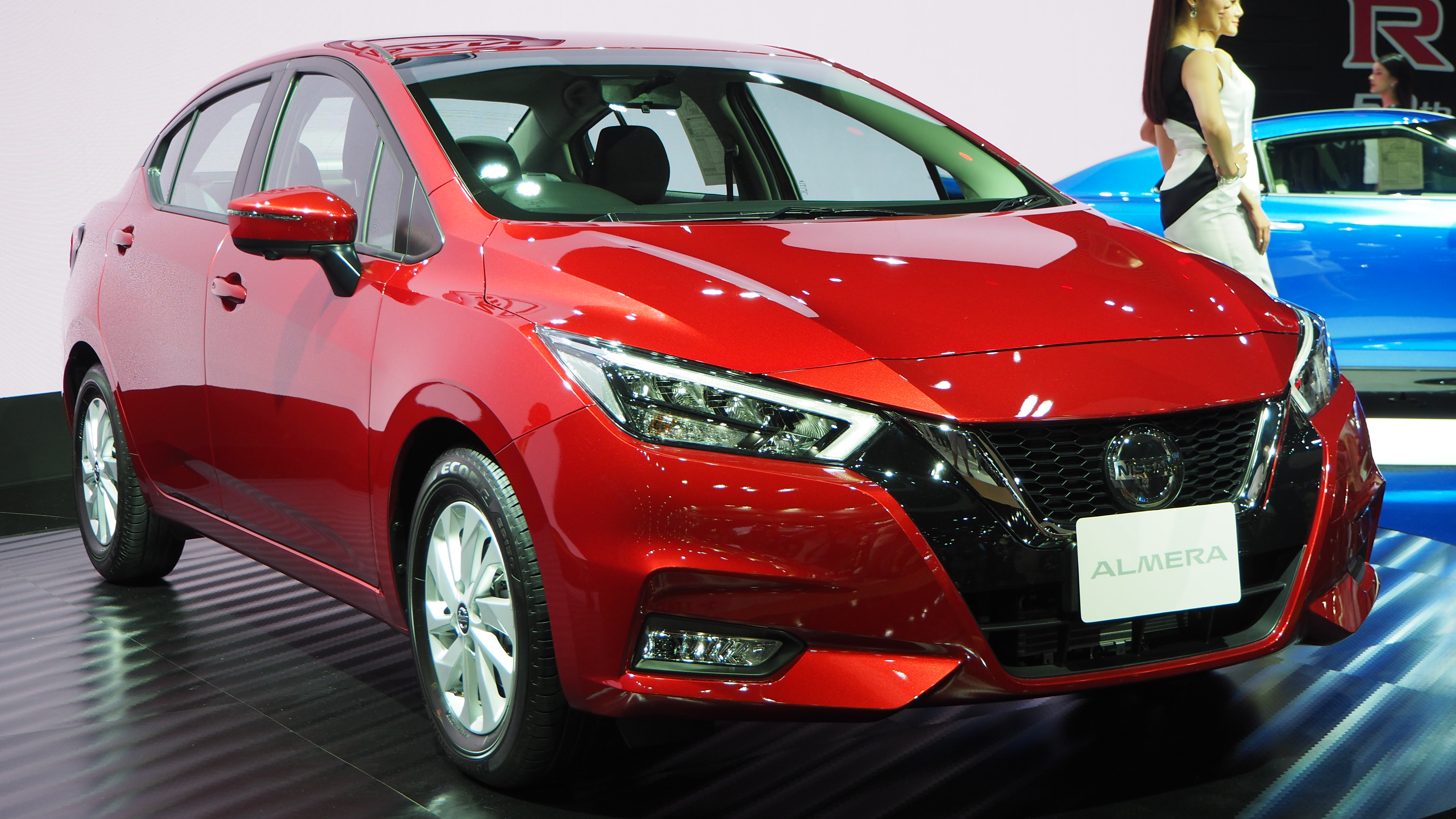
Nissan Almera (N18)
09/2012–present

Former production

Nissan

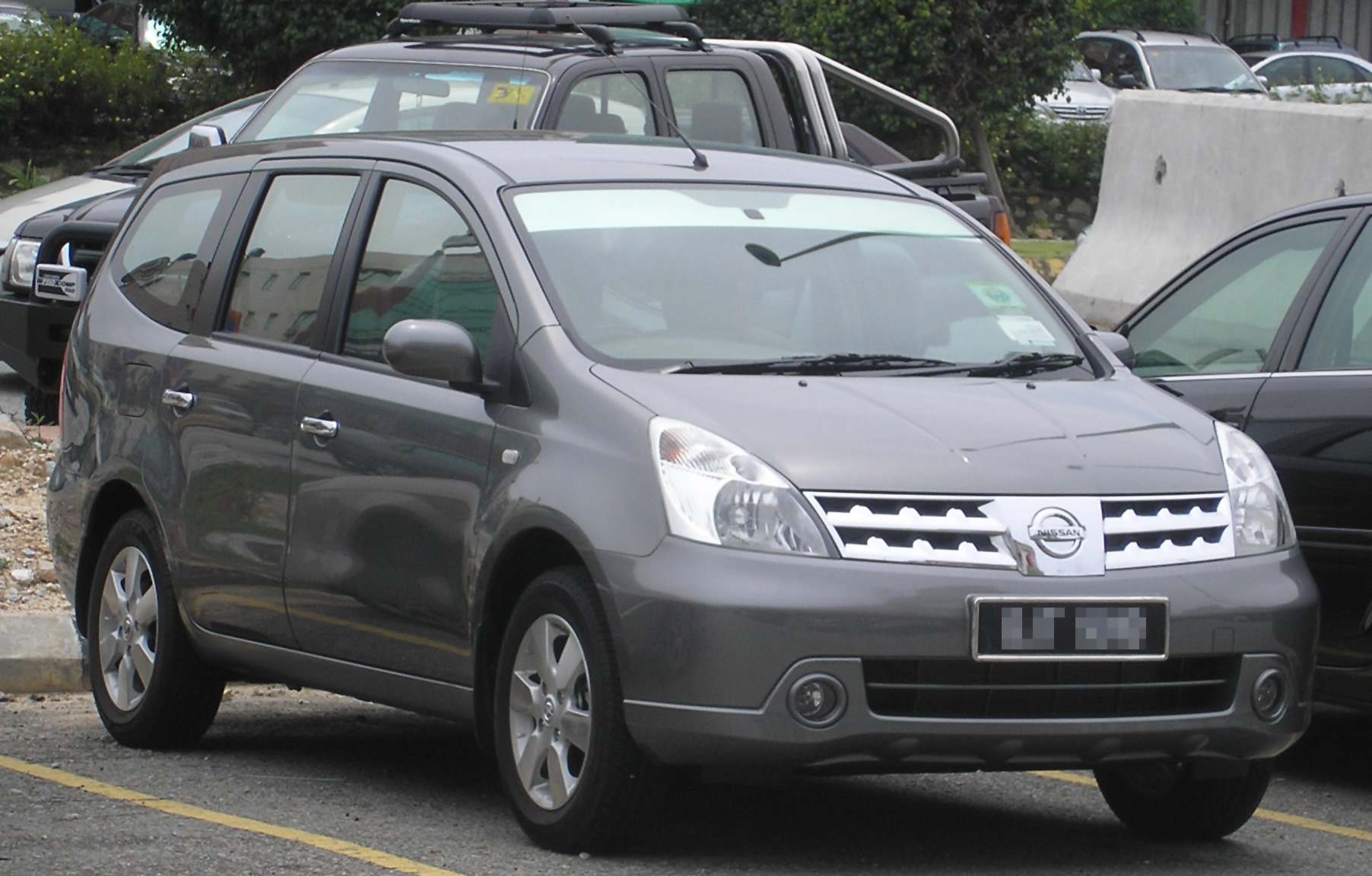
Nissan Grand Livina
2007–2018

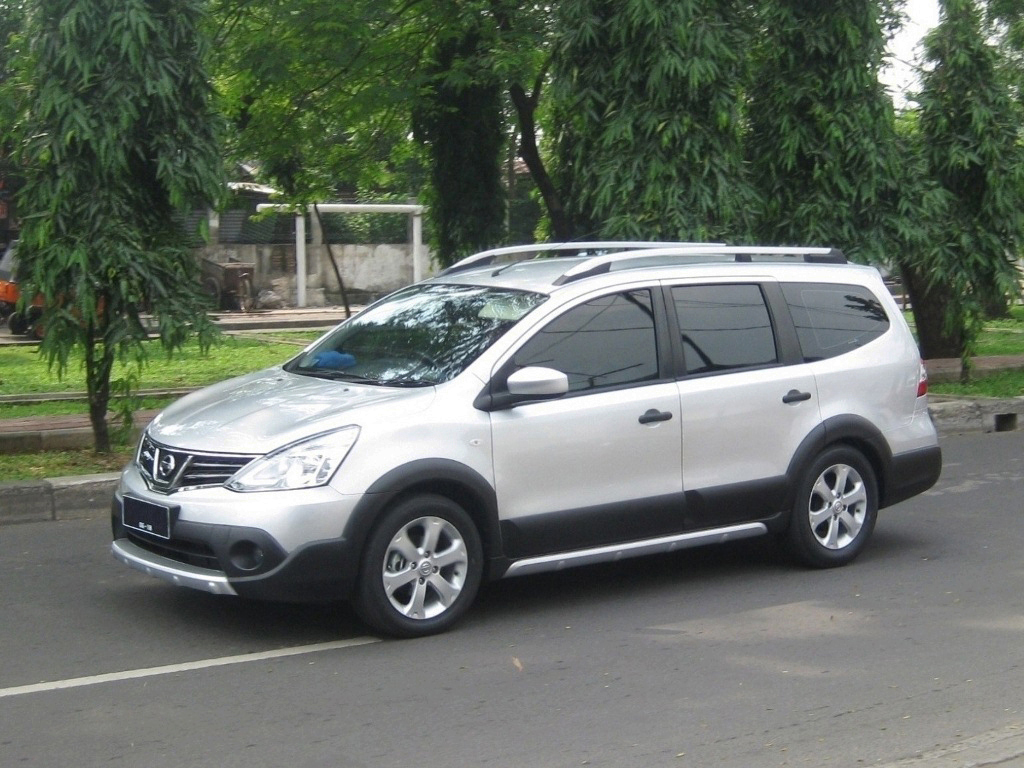
Nissan X-Gear
2011–2018

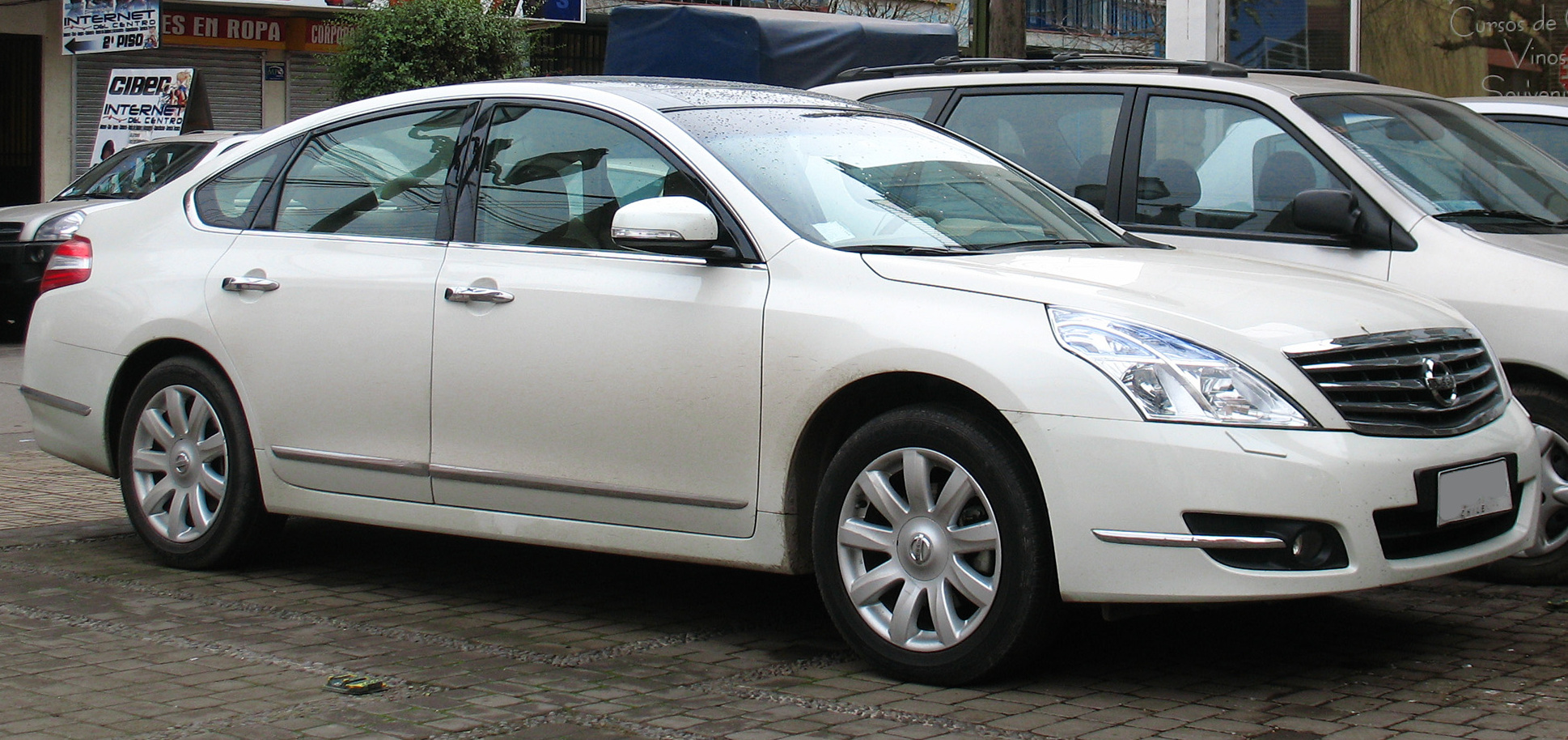
Nissan Teana (J32)
09/2010–2014

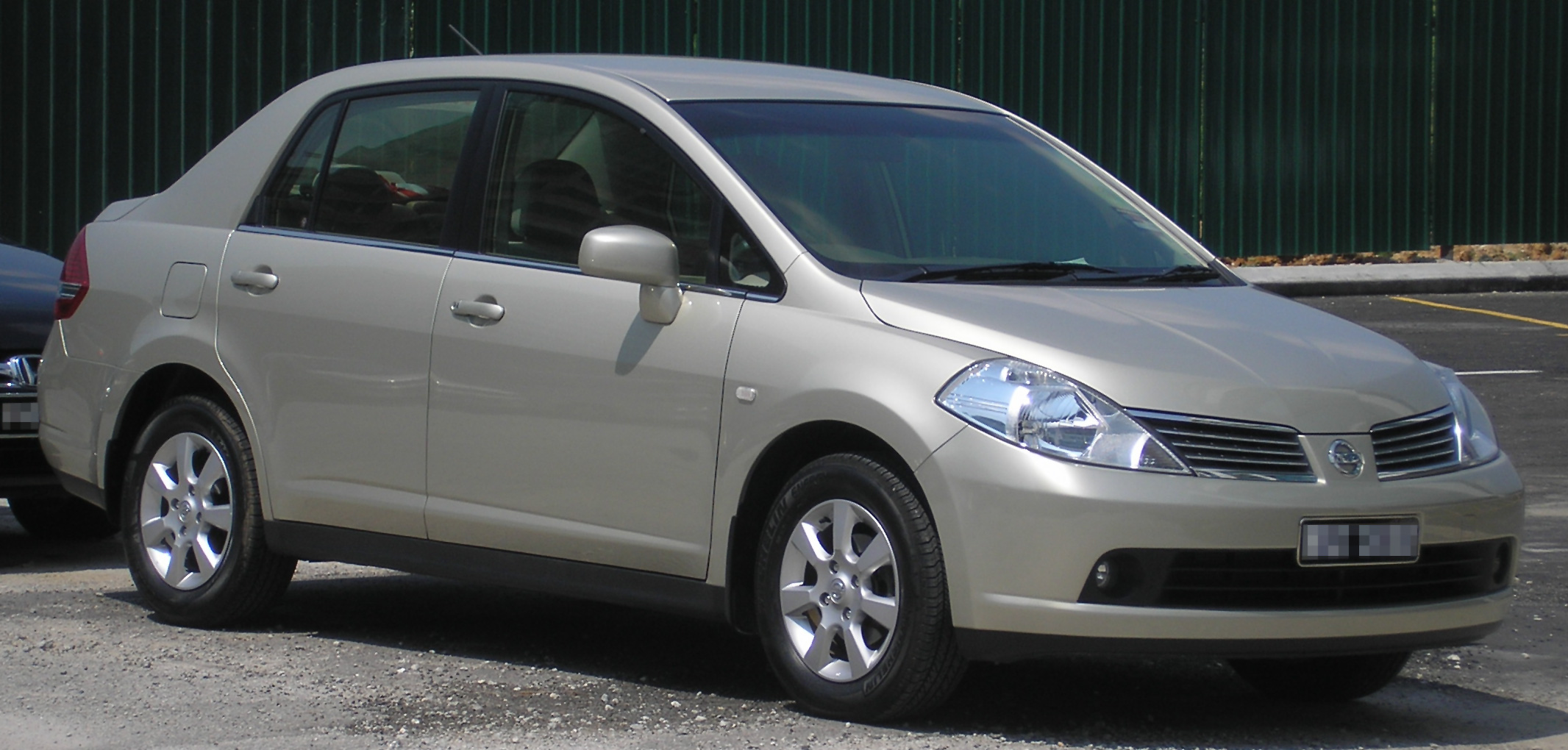
Nissan Latio (C11) sedan
2007–05/2015

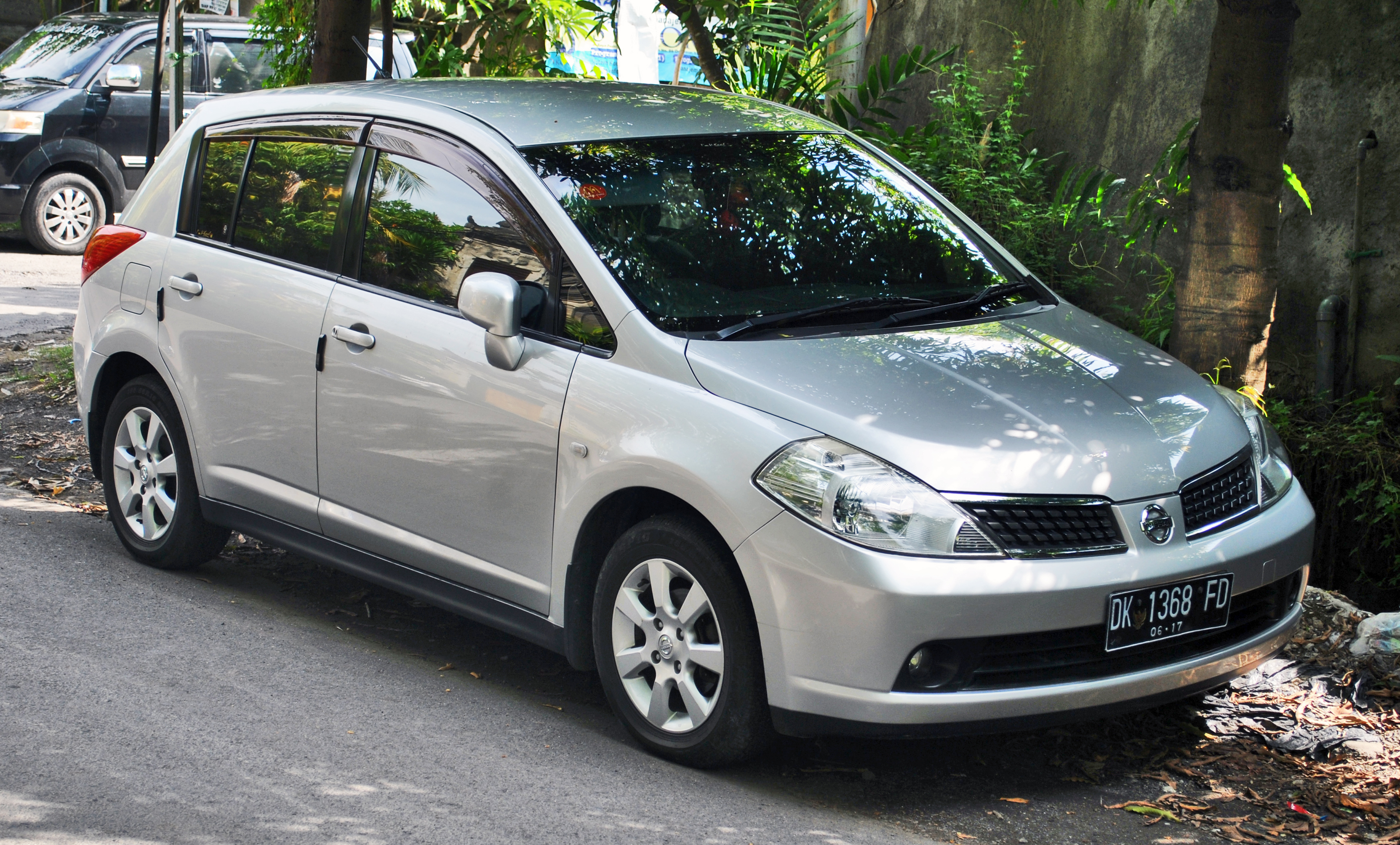
Nissan Latio (C11) hatchback
2007–05/2015

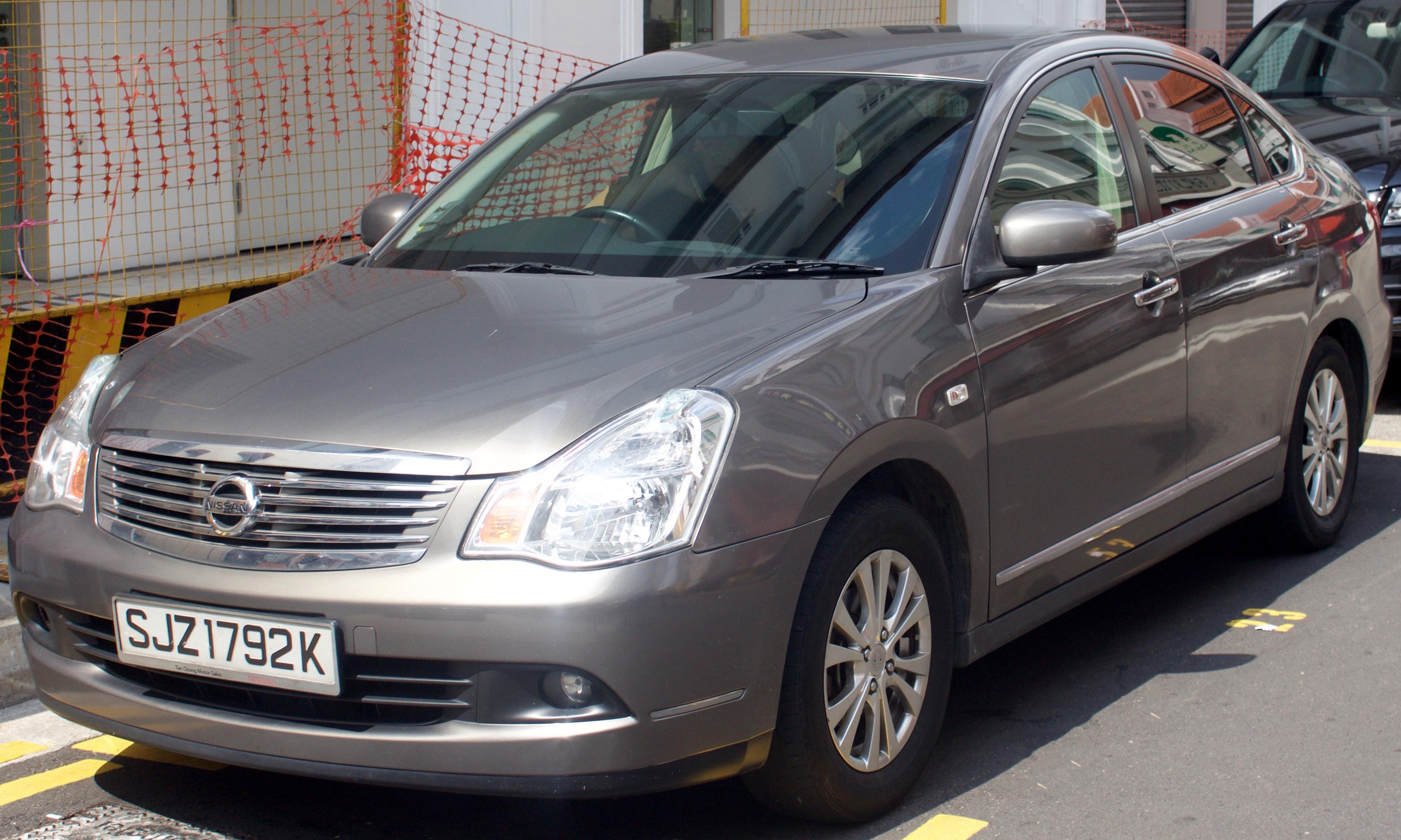
Nissan Sylphy (G11)
2008–08/2015

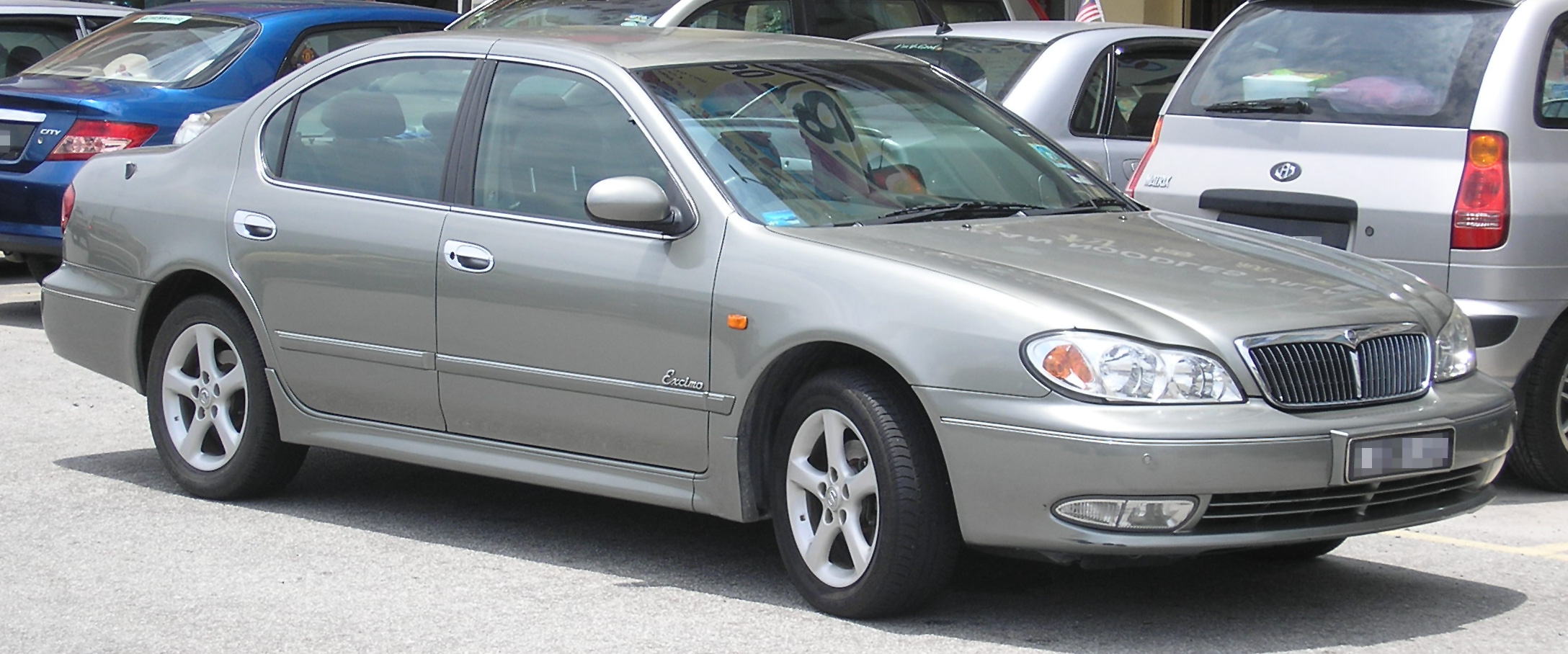
Nissan Cefiro
1994–2008

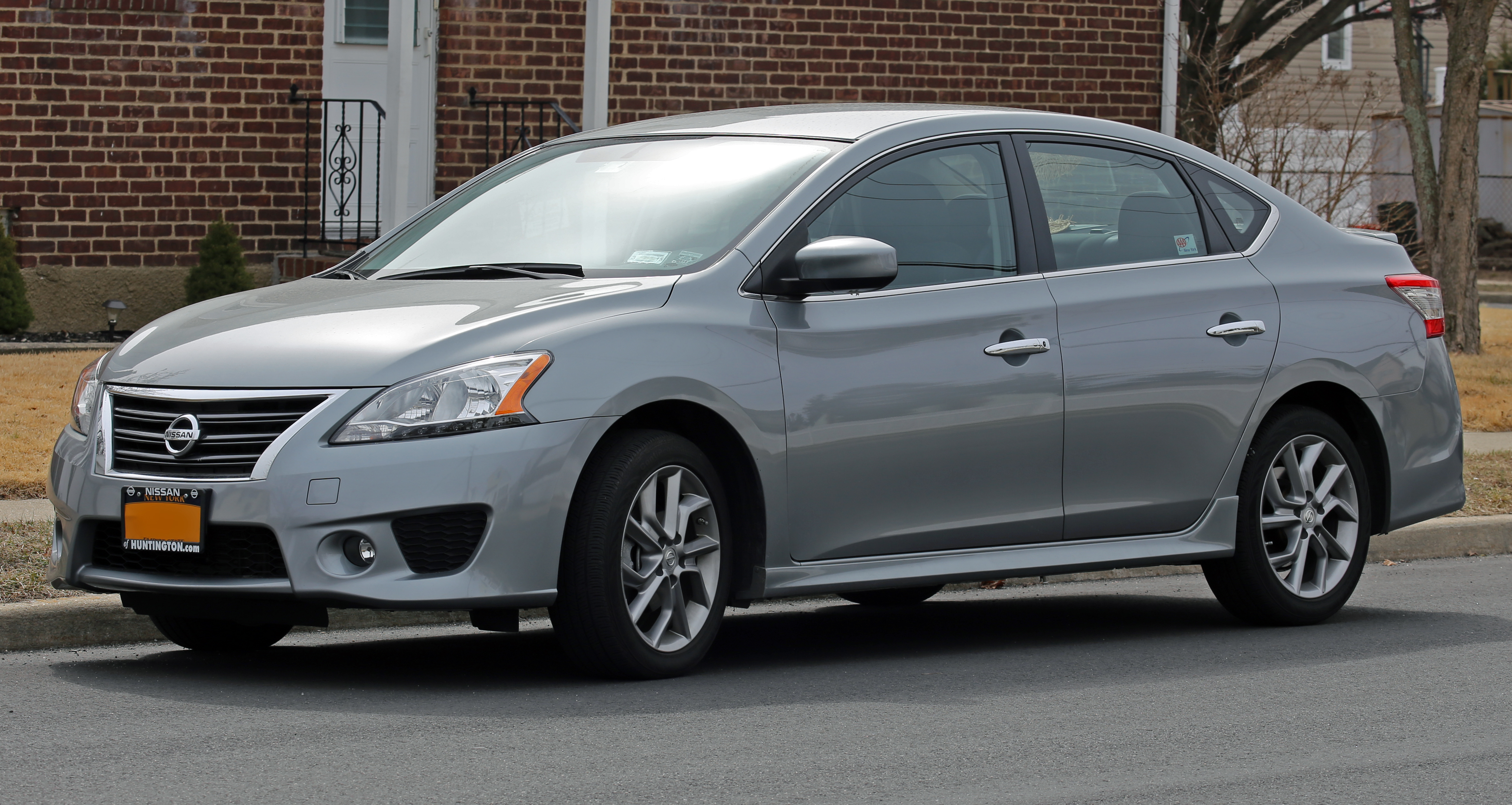
Nissan Sylphy (B17)
11/2013–02/2020

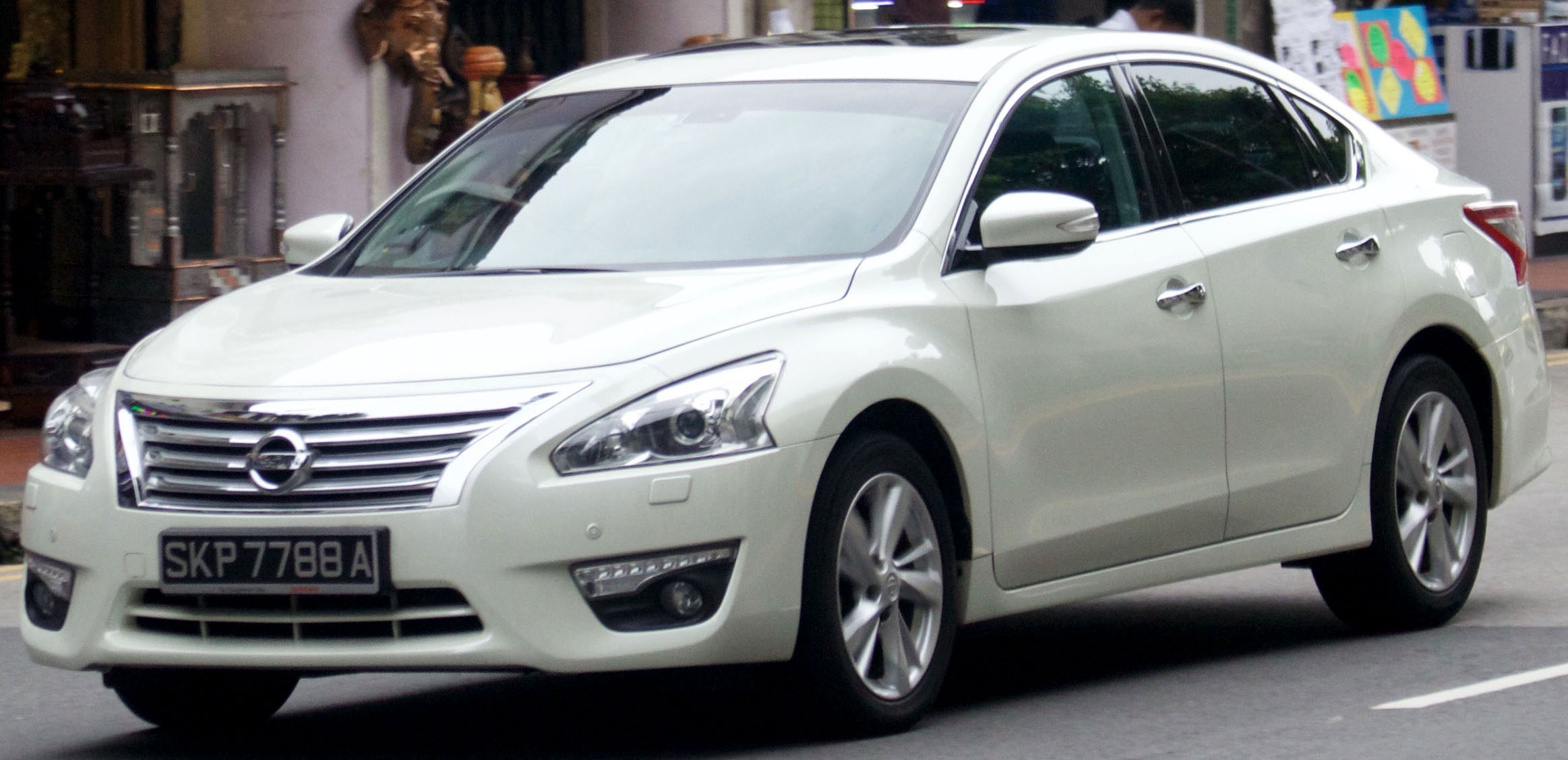
Nissan Teana (L33)
04/2014–05/2019

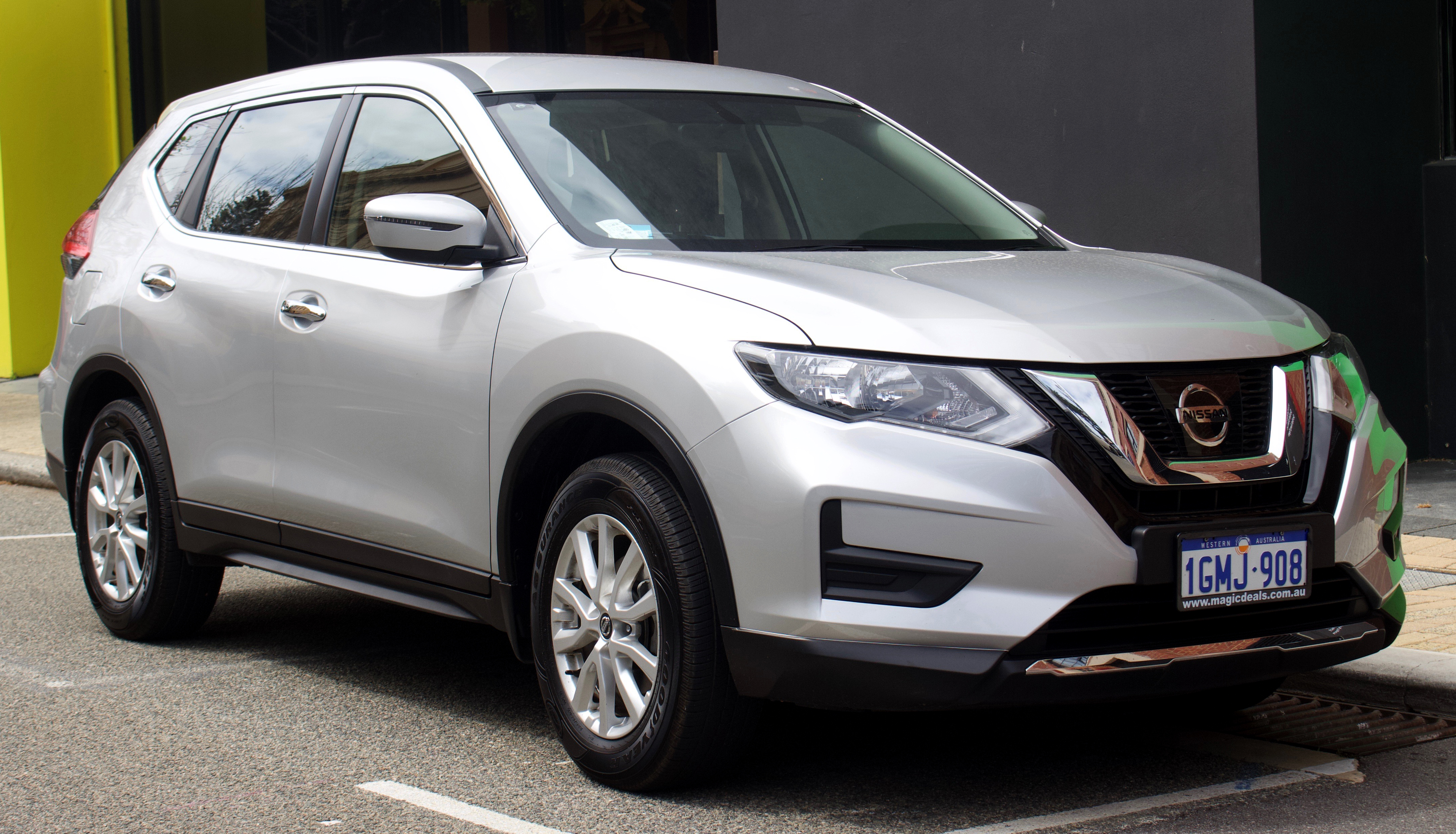
Nissan X-Trail
01/2015–2020

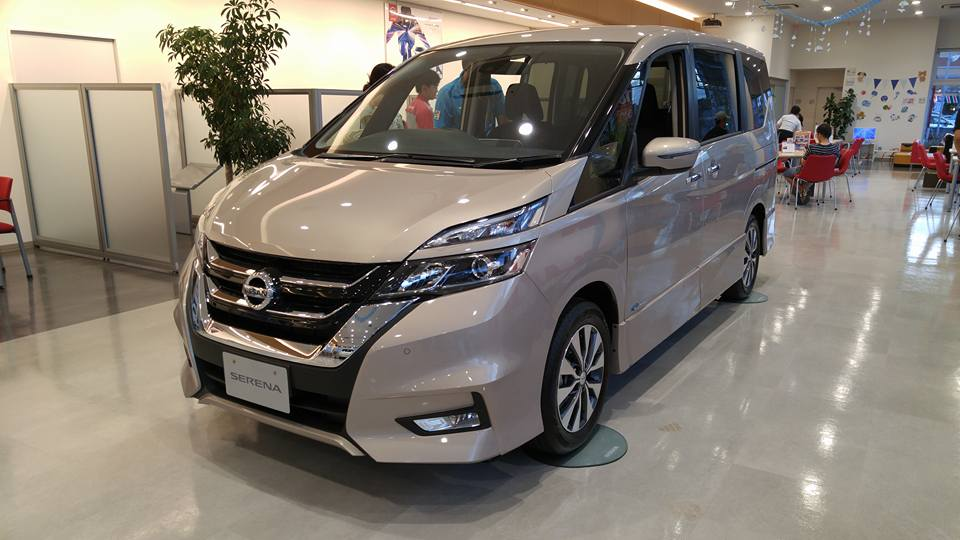
Nissan Serena S-Hybrid
10/2014–2026

=== Segambut, Kuala Lumpur, Malaysia ===
Current production

GAC

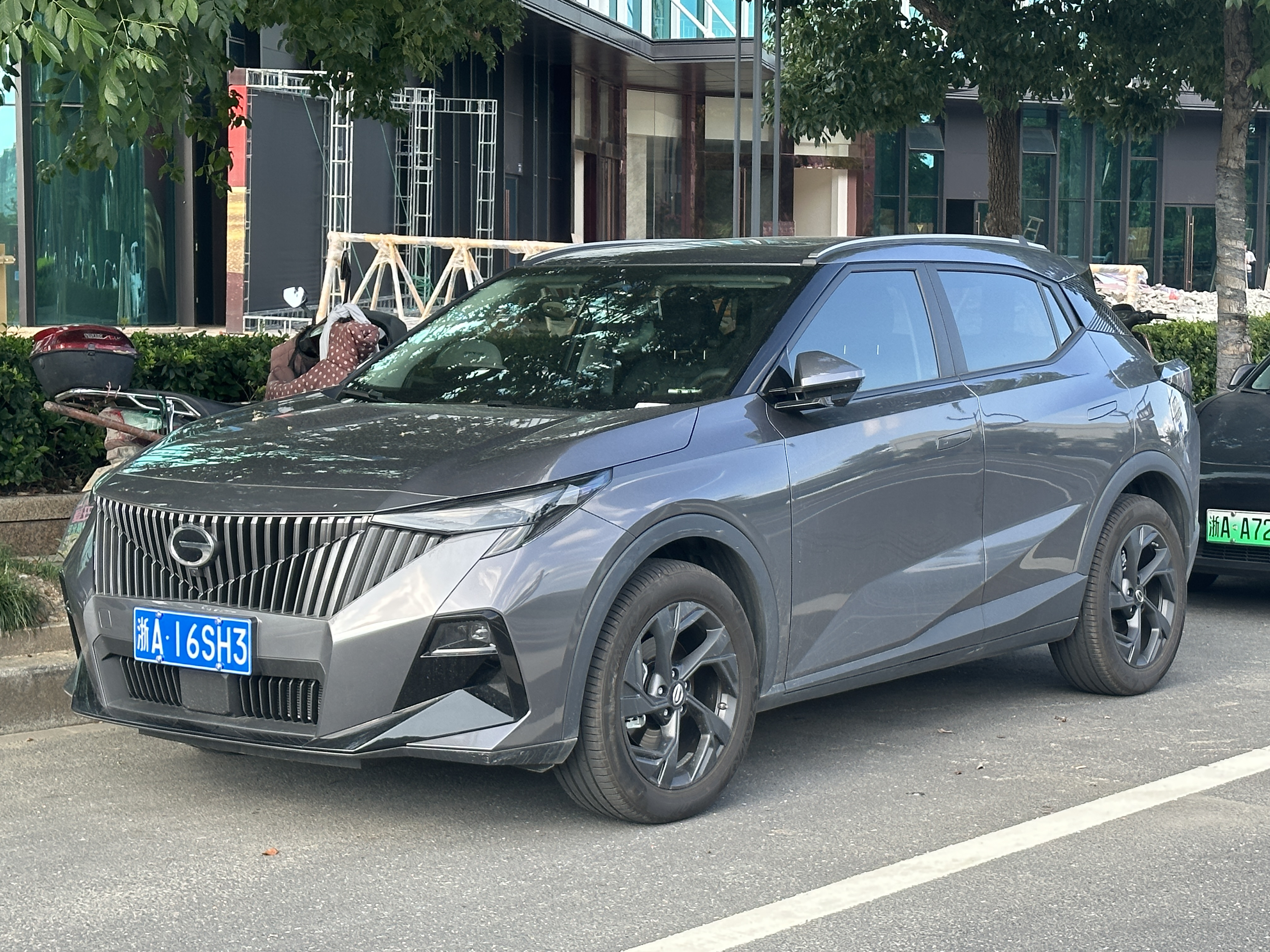
GAC GS3 Enzoom 04/2024–present

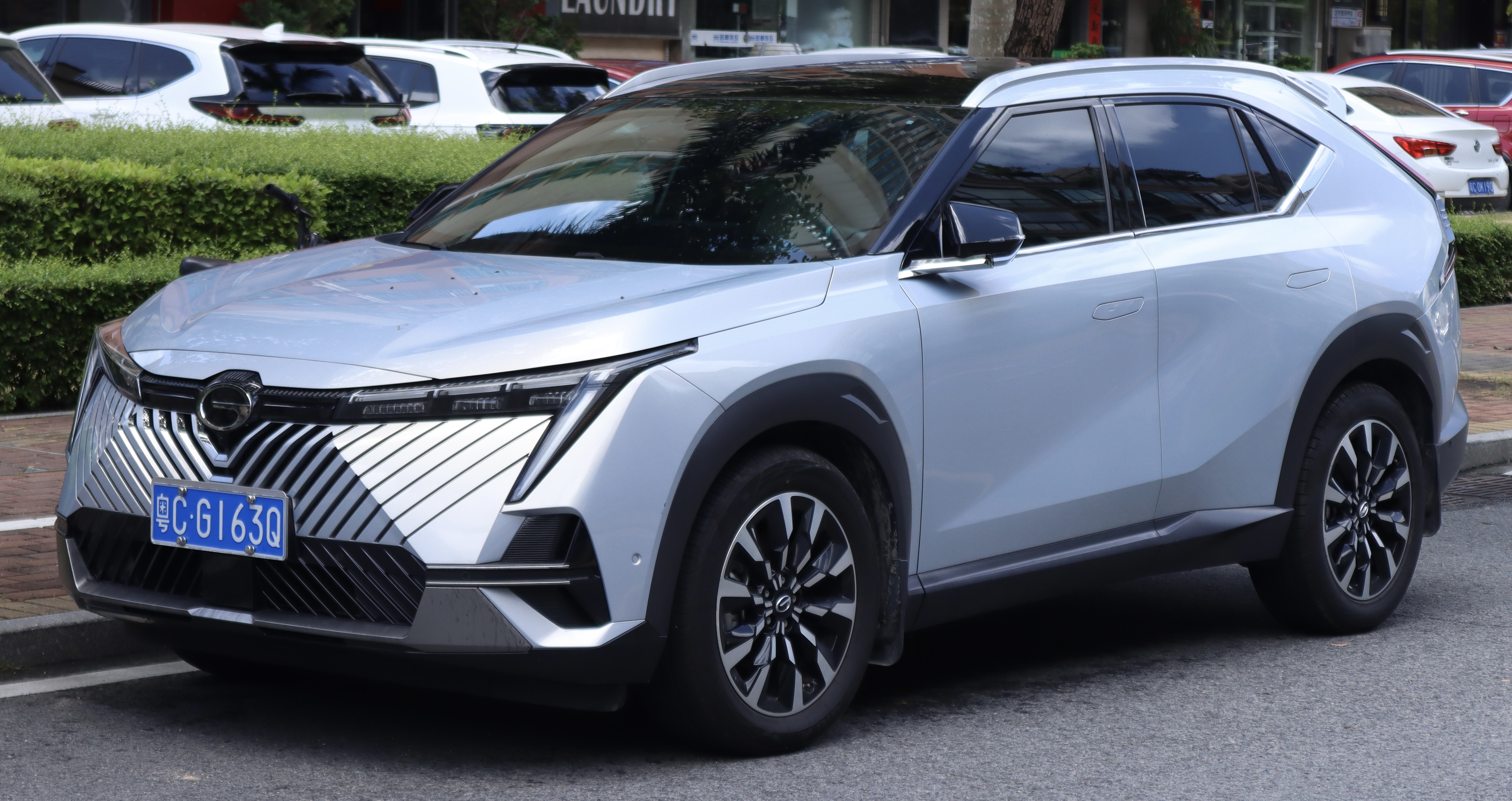
GAC Emkoo 06/2025–present

Nissan

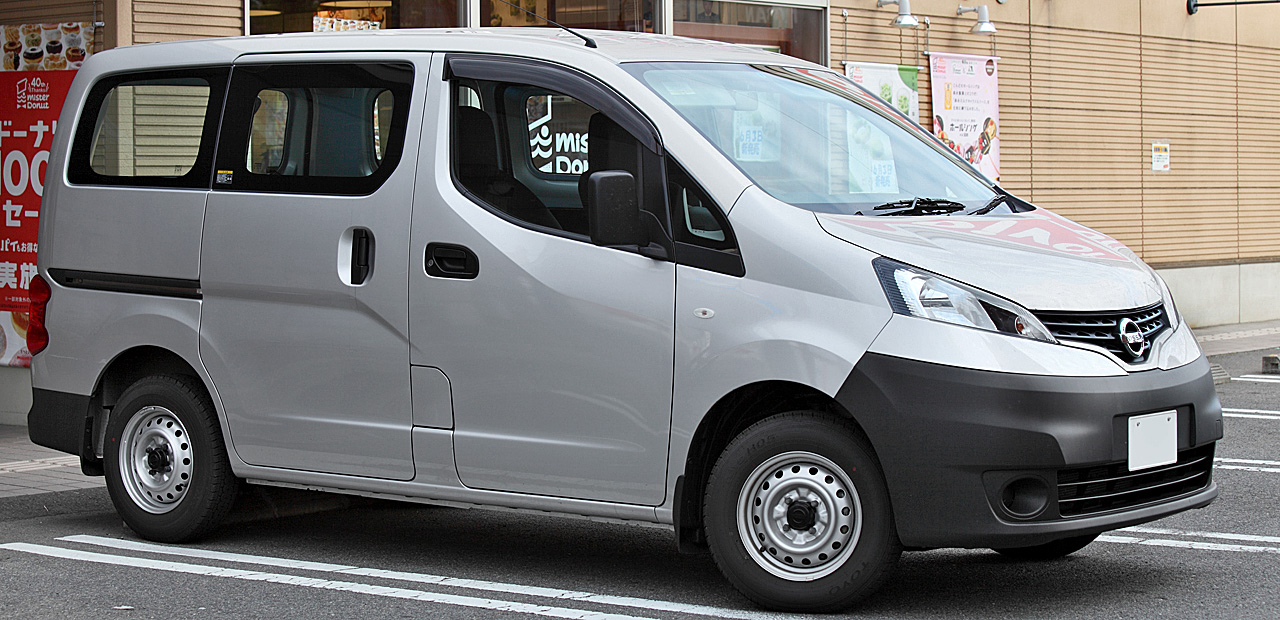
Nissan NV200
07/2012–present

Wuling

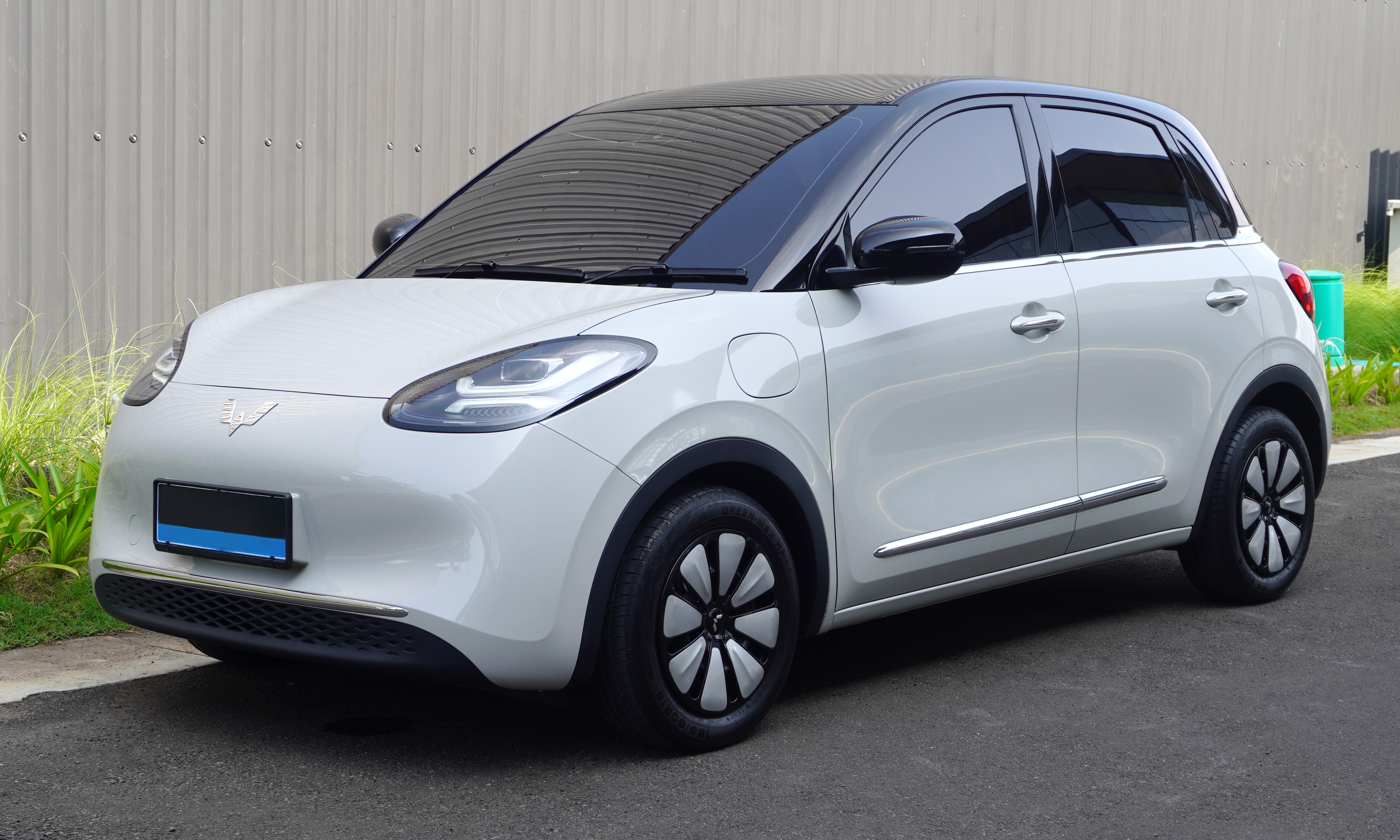
Wuling Bingo EV 12/2025–present

Former production

Nissan

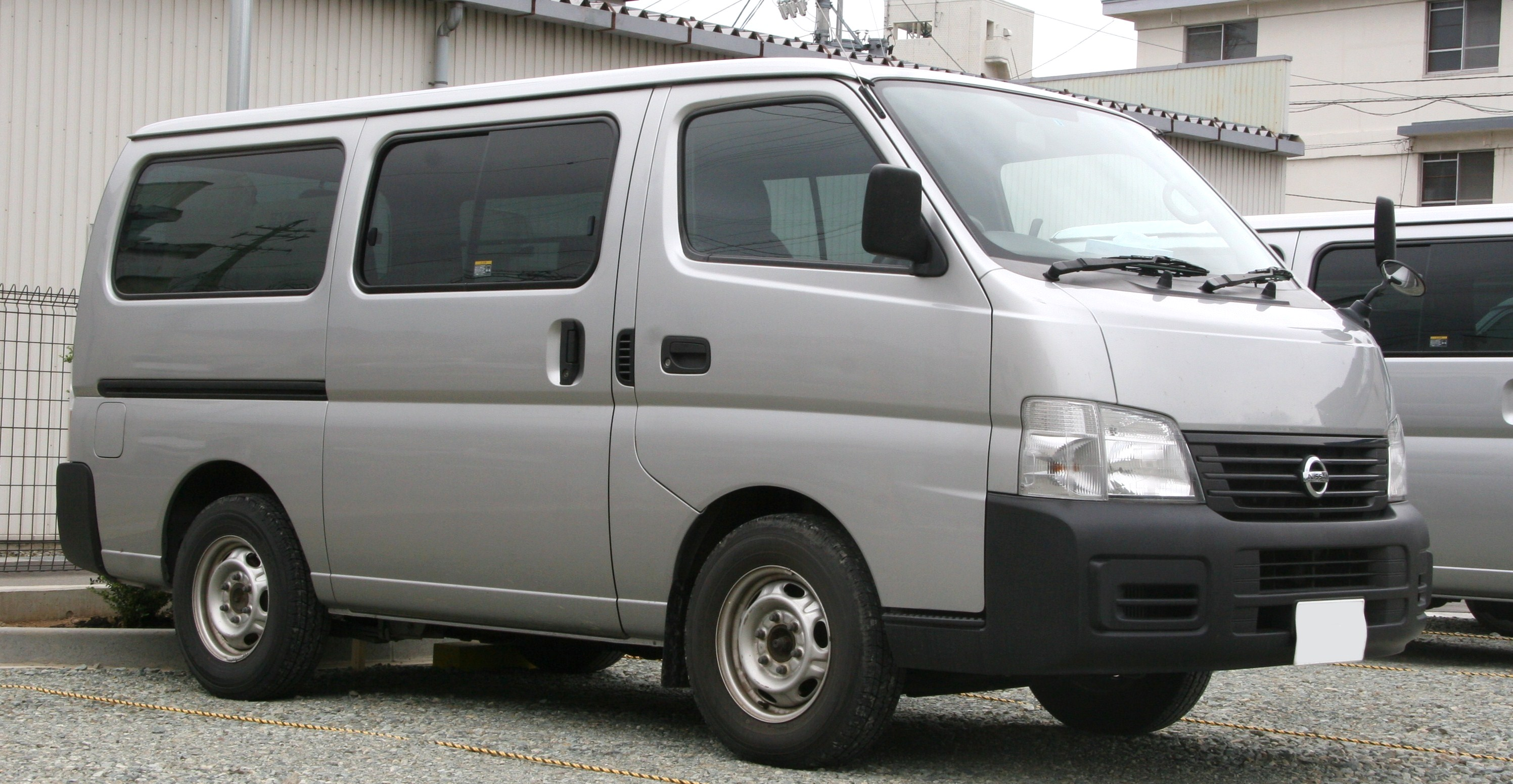
Nissan Urvan (E25)
2007–03/2015

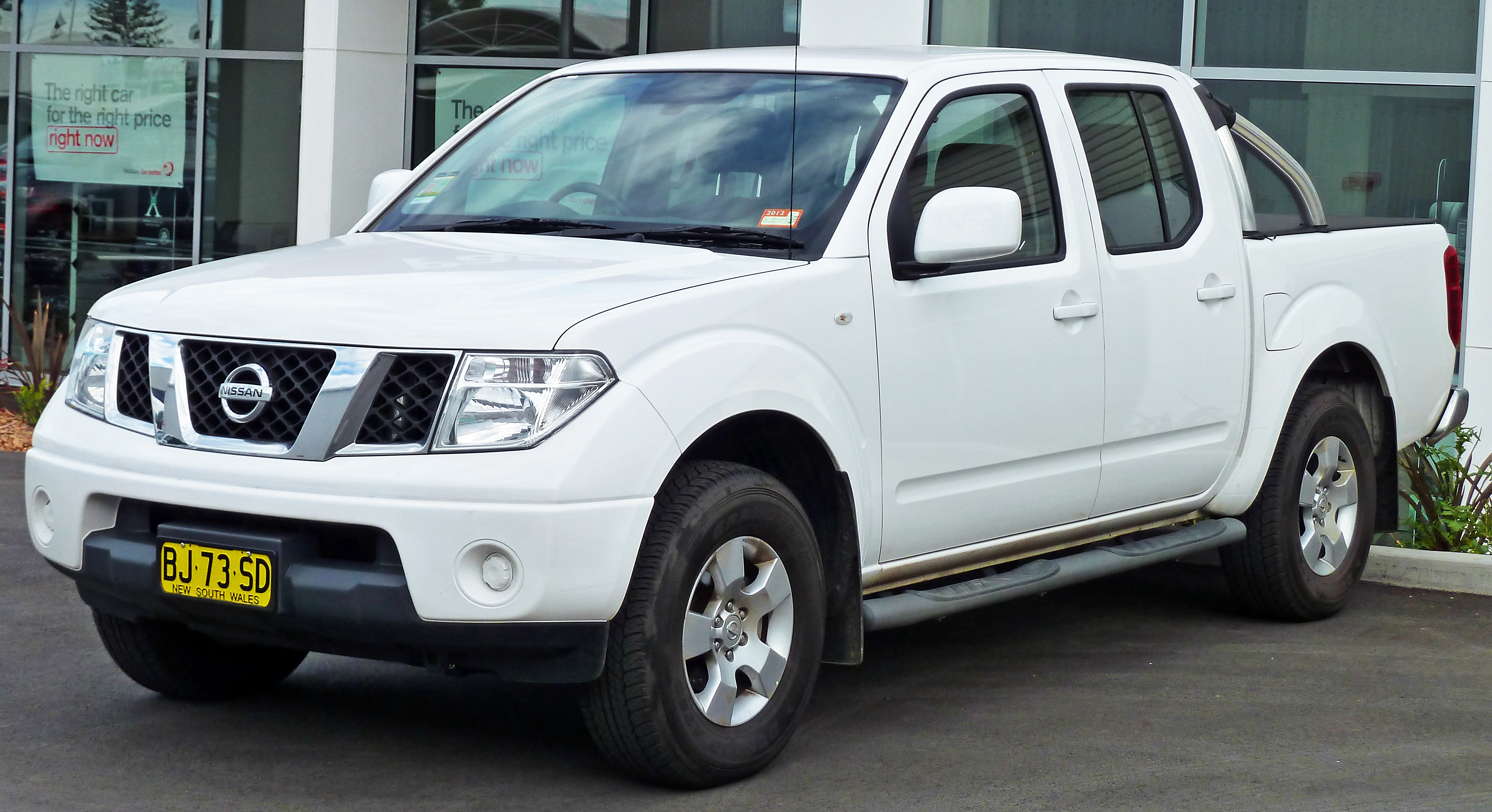
Nissan Navara (D40)
2008–2017

Subaru

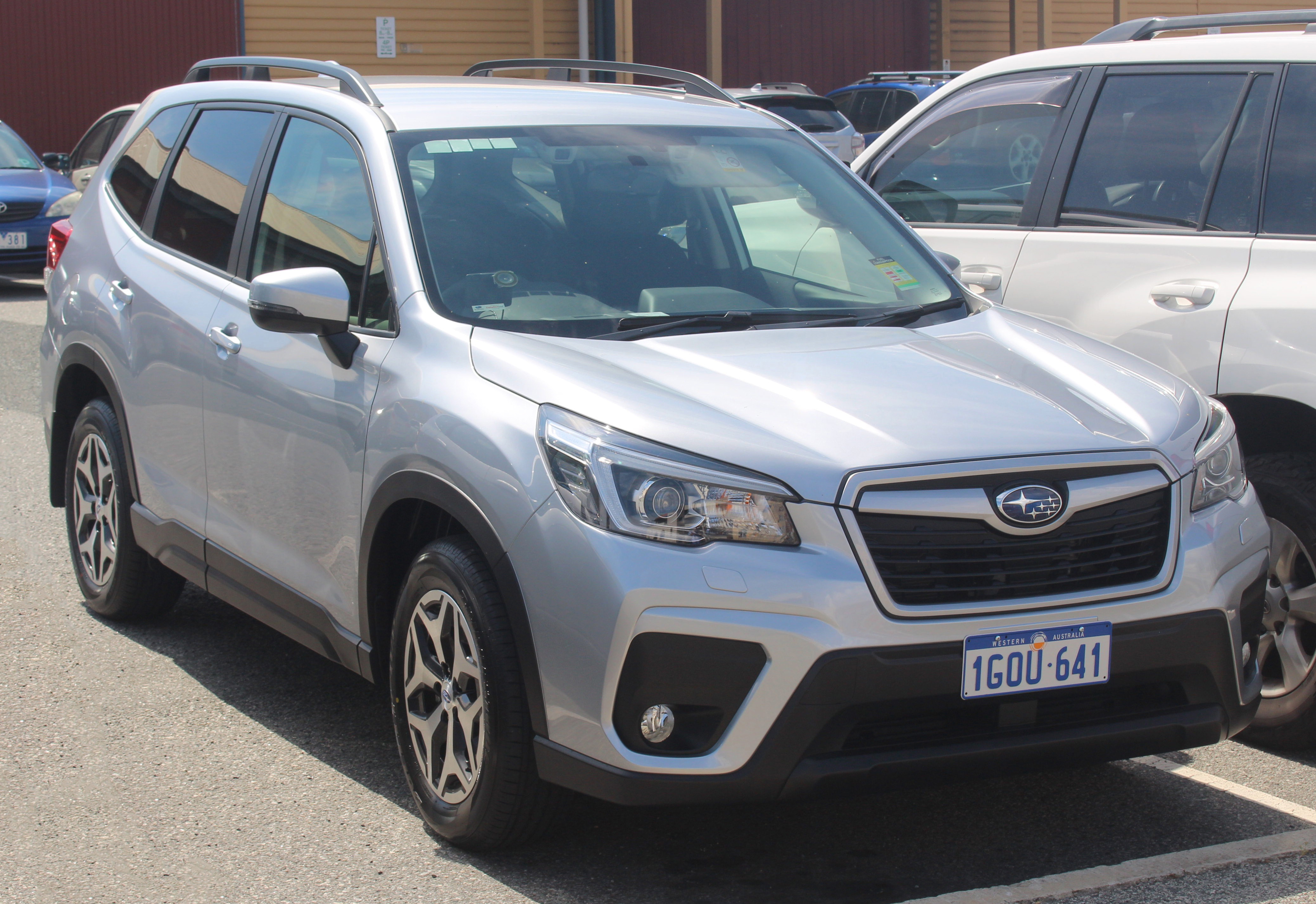
Subaru Forester
02/2016–2019

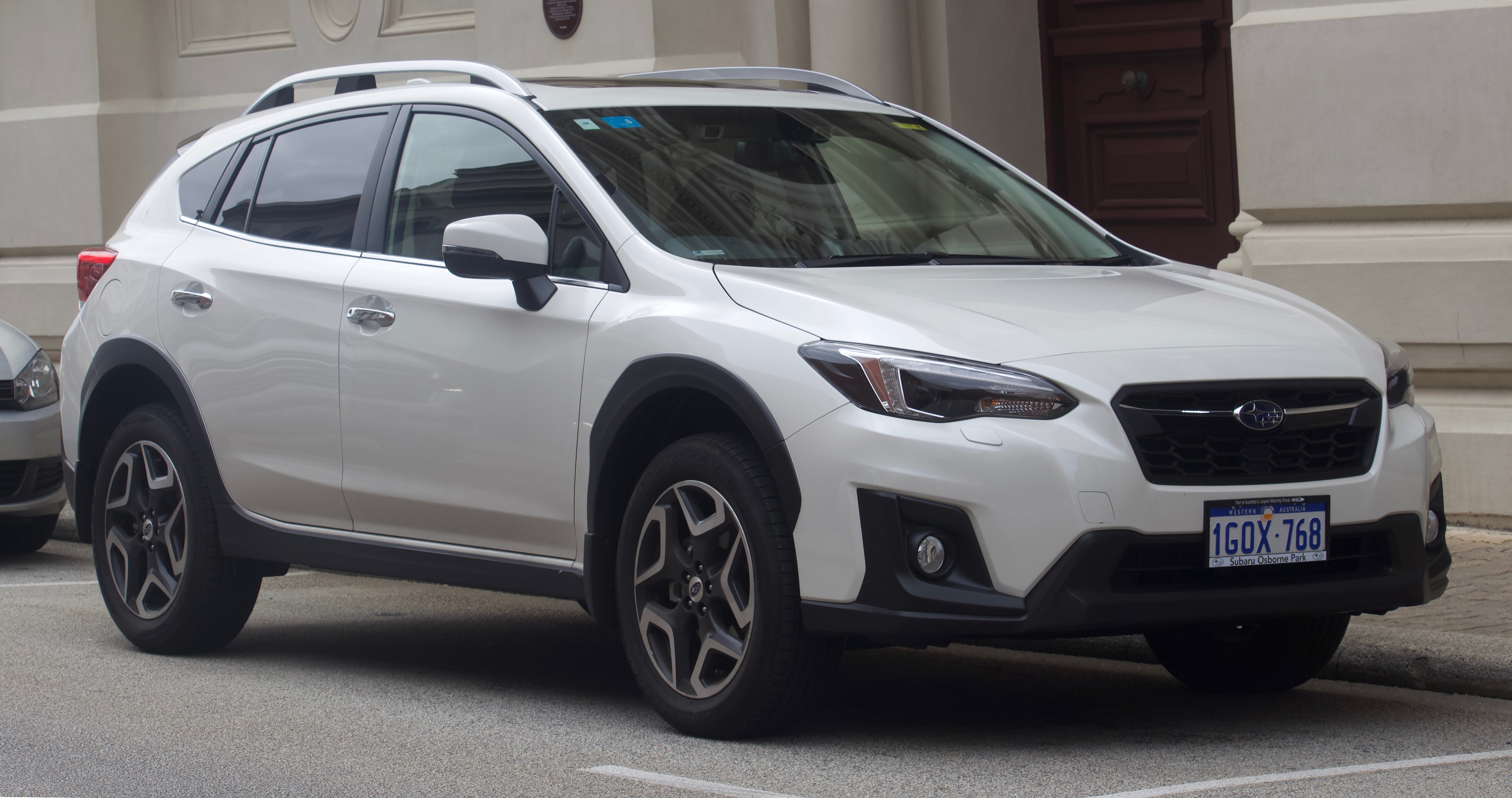
Subaru XV
11/2012–2023

Mitsubishi

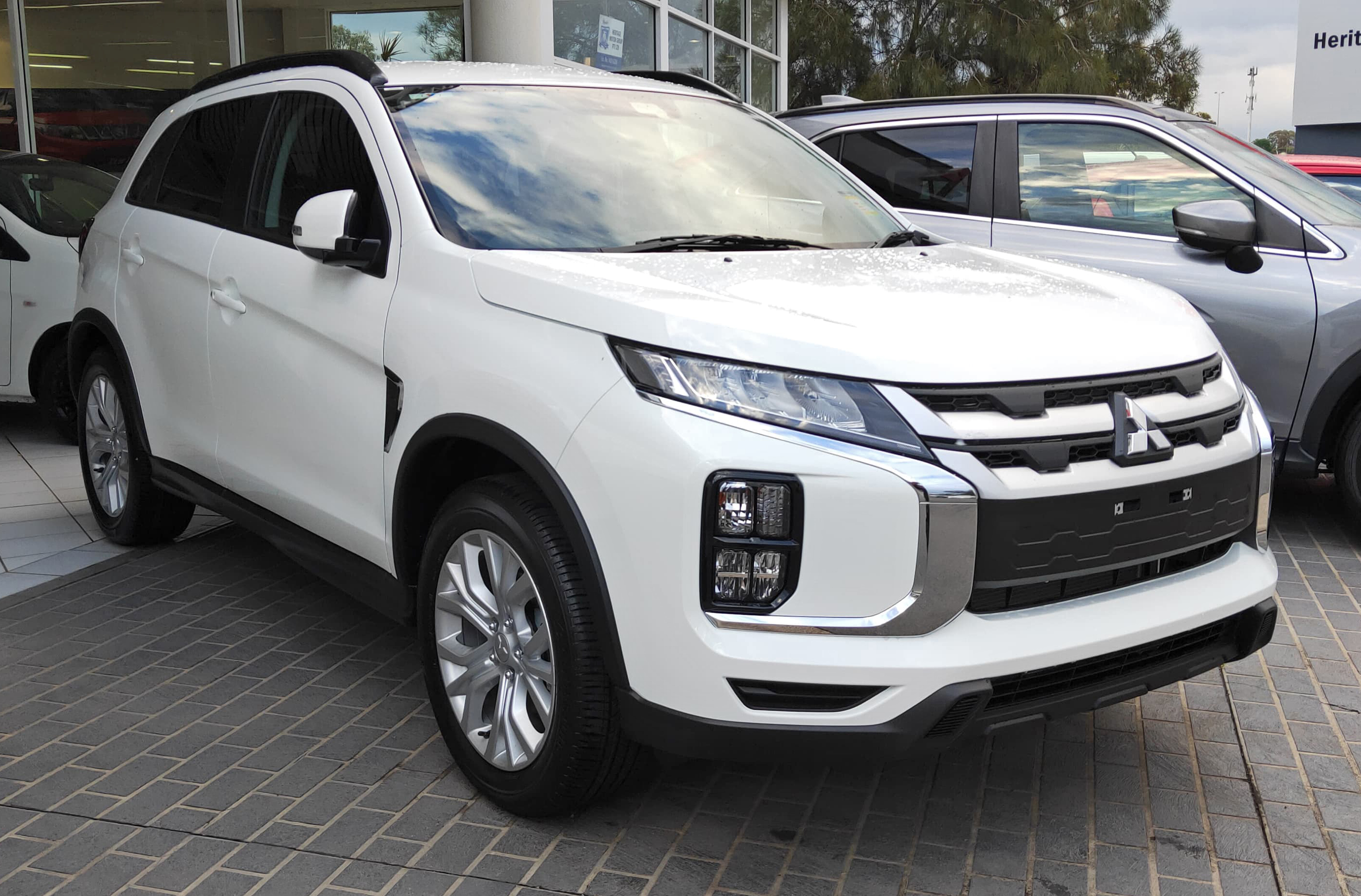
Mitsubishi ASX
12/2013–04/2021

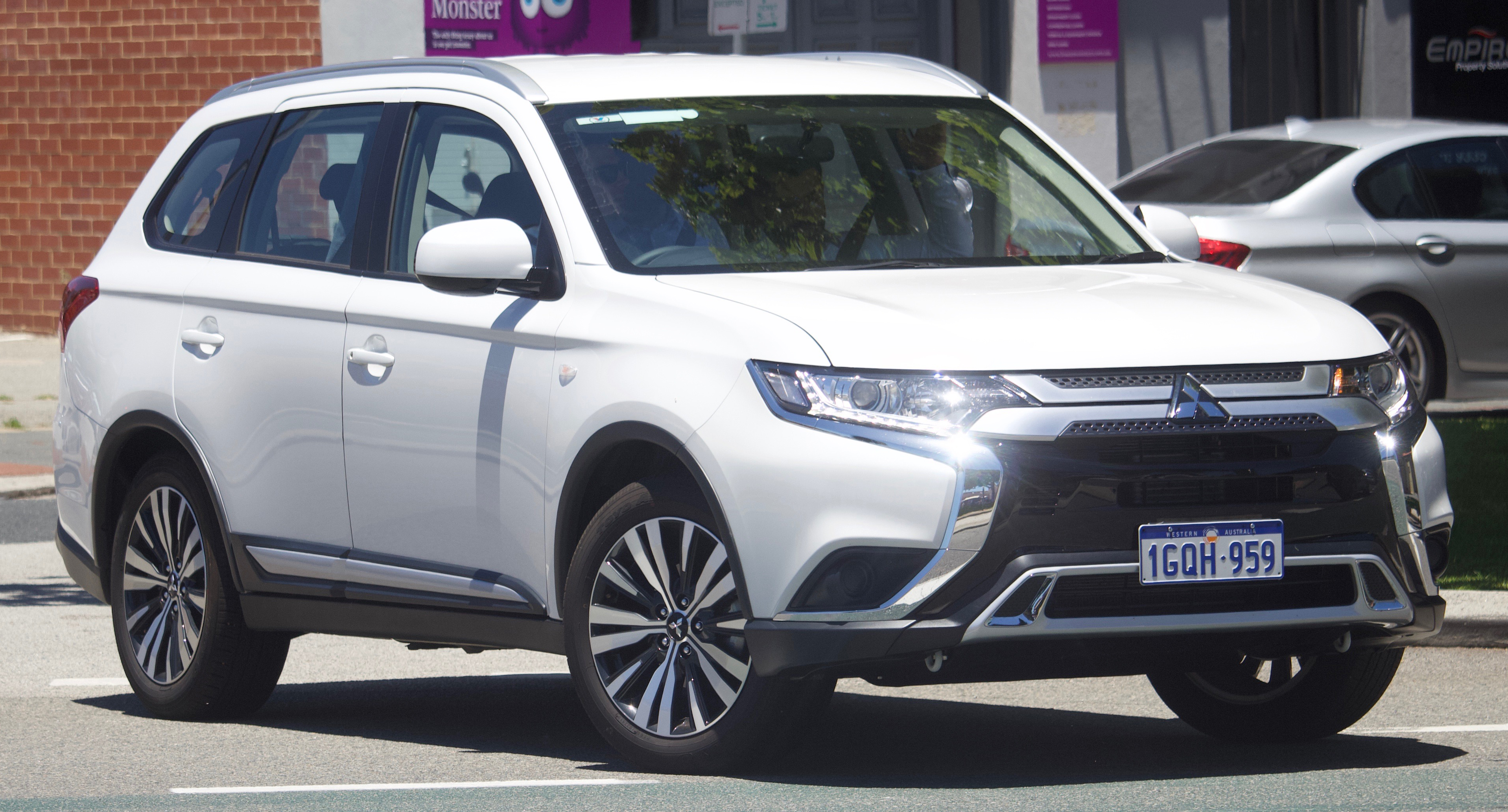
Mitsubishi Outlander
09/2017–2021

Renault

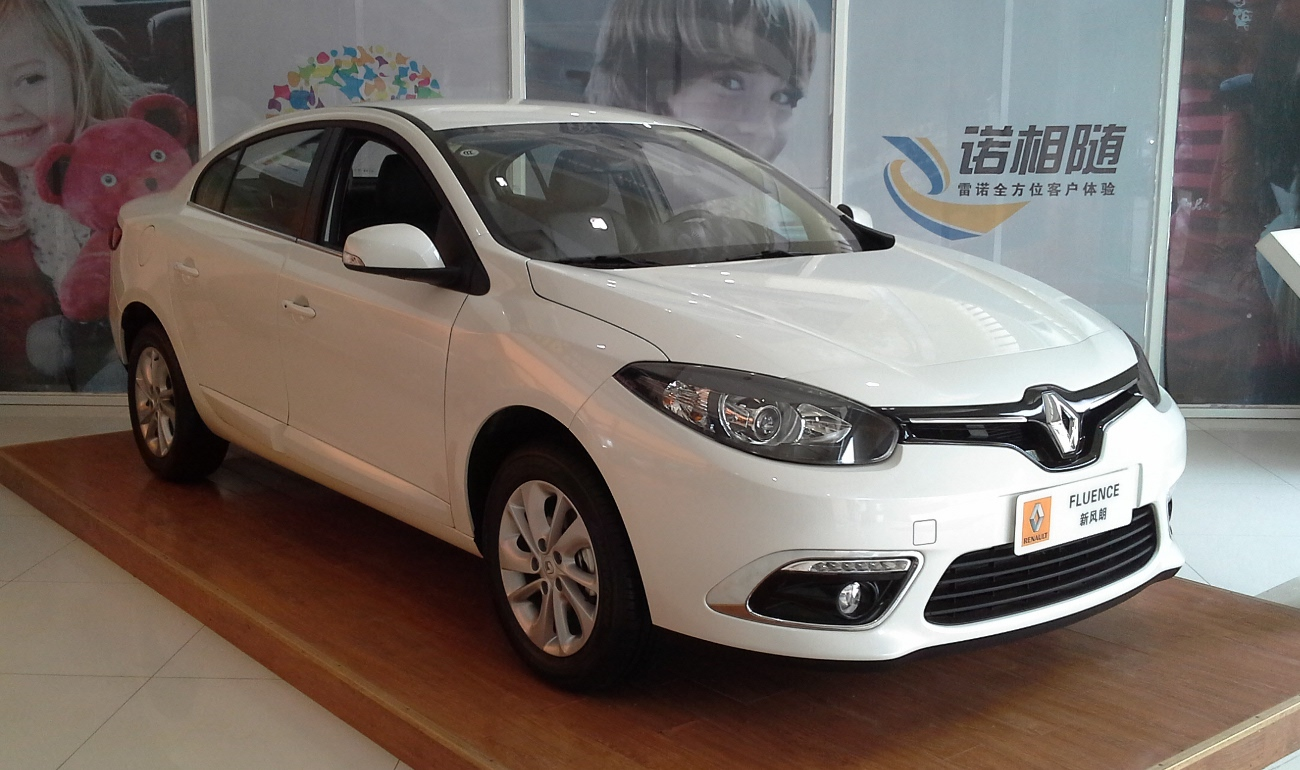
Renault Fluence
04/2014–2016

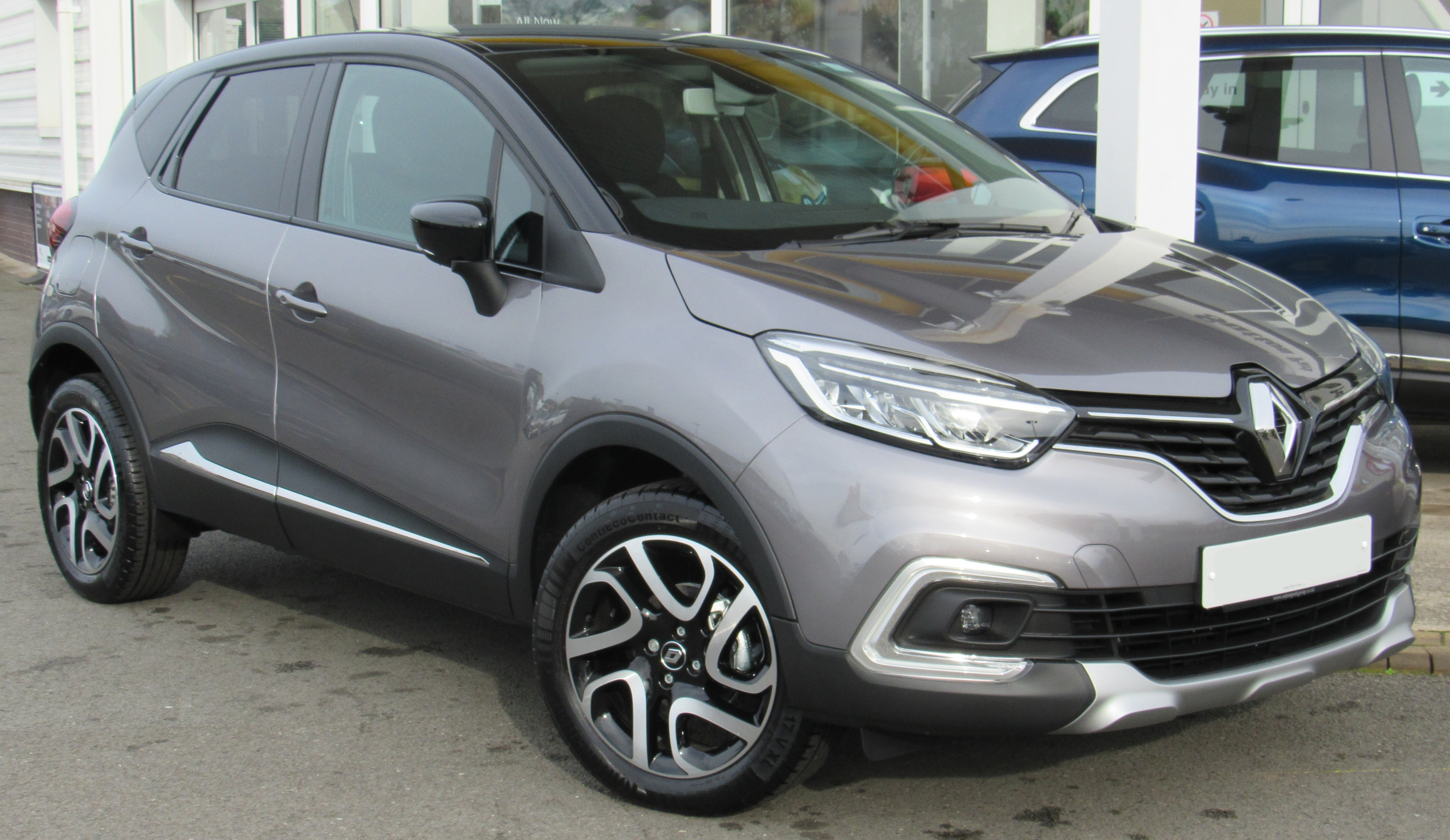
Renault Captur
04/2017–2019

=== Da Nang, Vietnam ===
Former production

Nissan

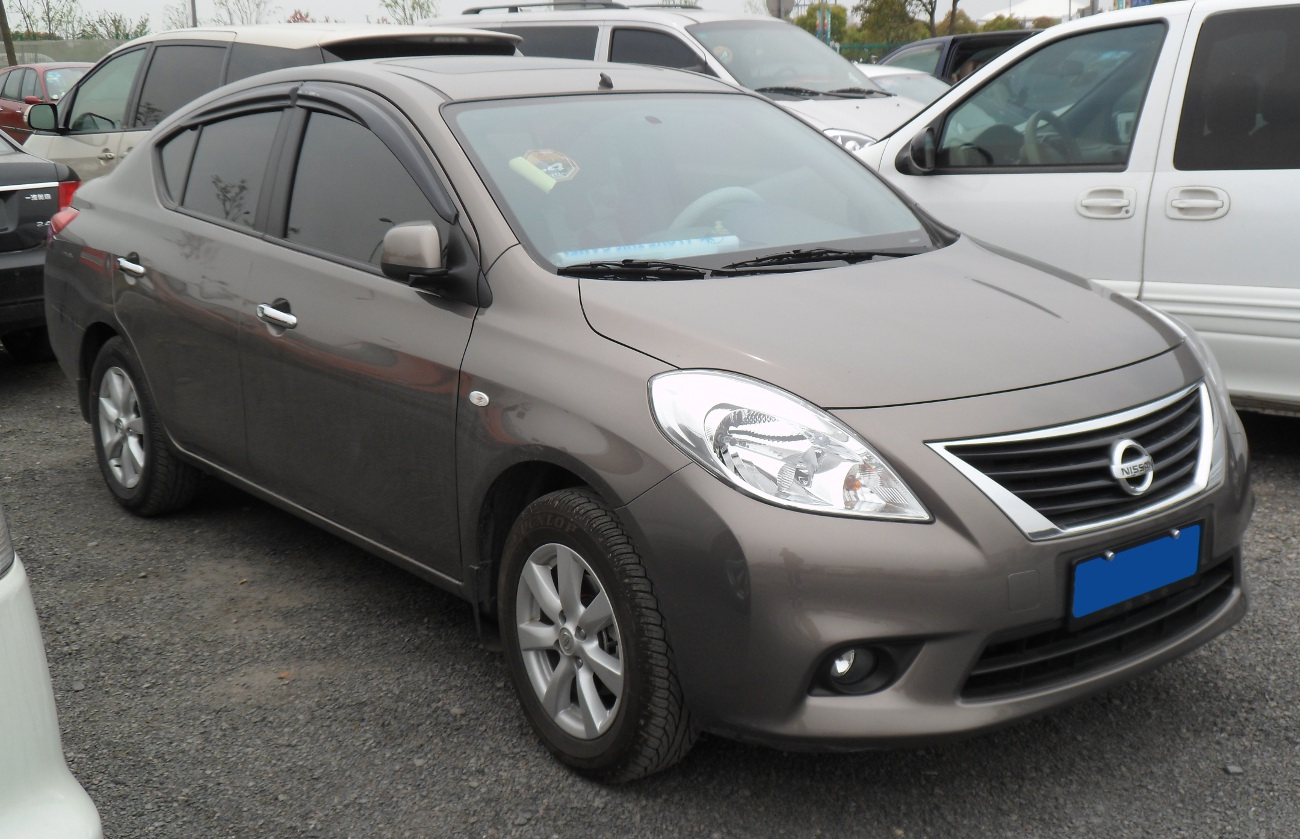
Nissan Sunny
06/2013–04/2021

=== Bago, Myanmar ===
Former production

Nissan

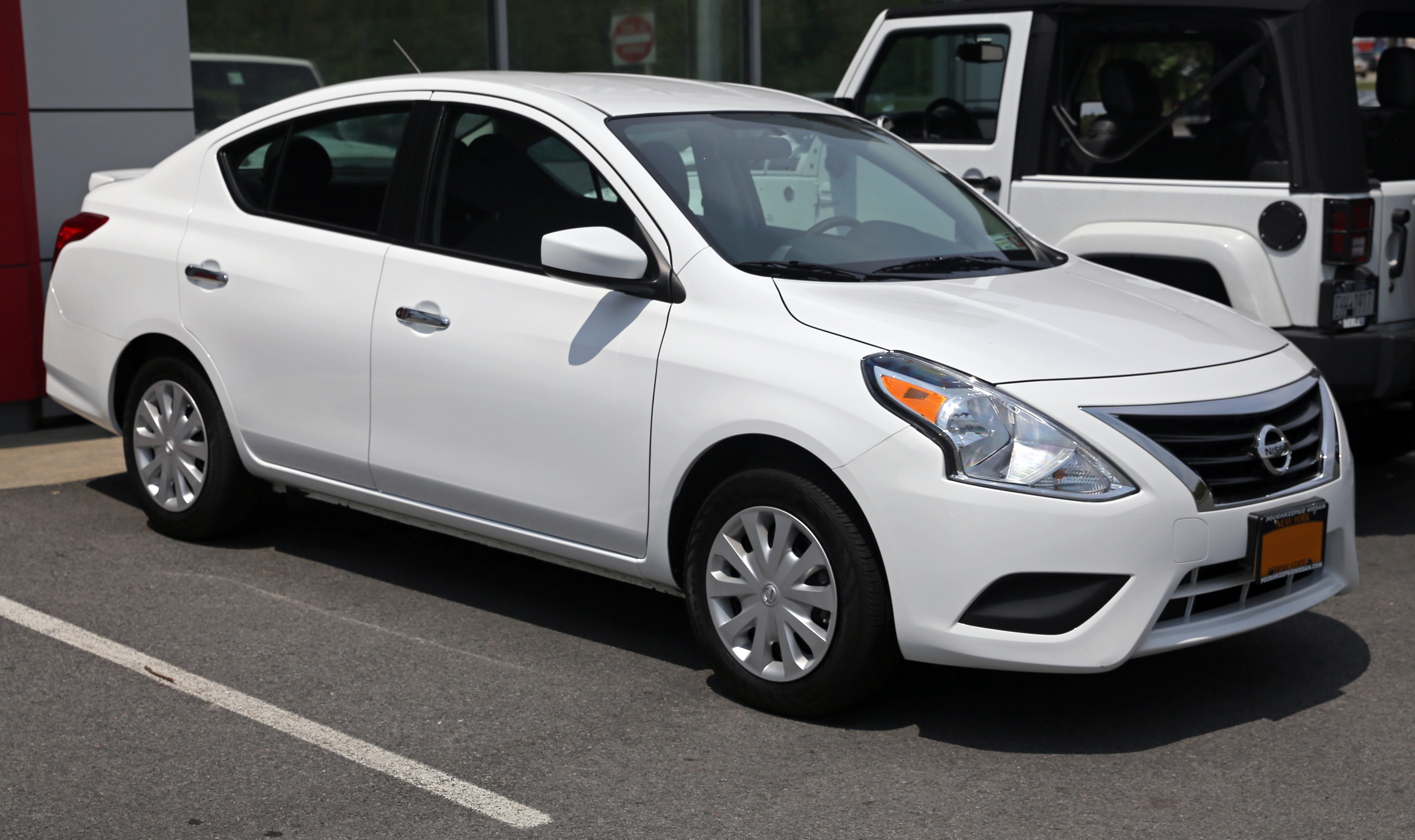
Nissan Sunny
2018–2023

=== Lat Krabang, Bangkok, Thailand ===
Former production

Subaru

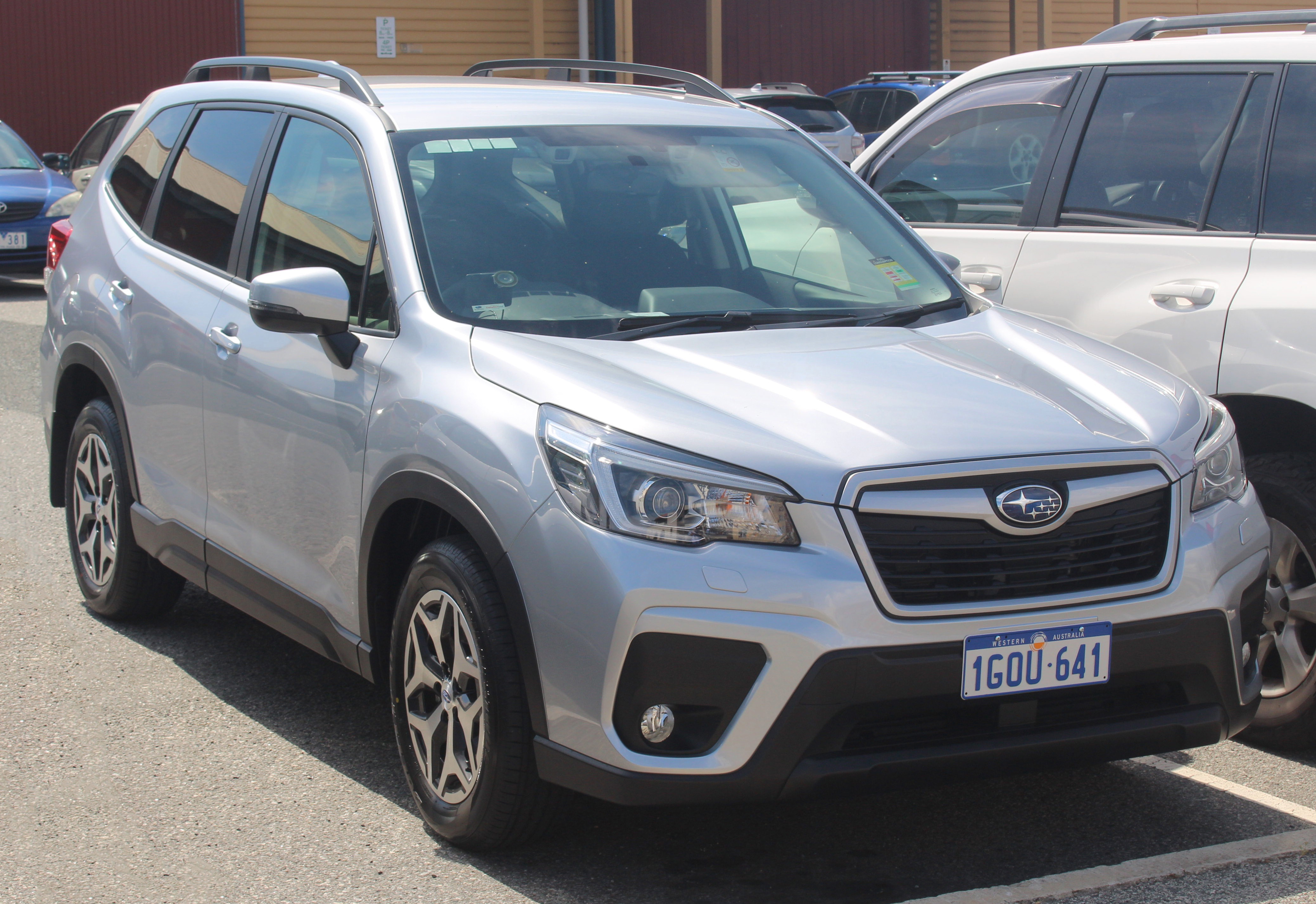
Subaru Forester
2018–2024

== Family feud ==
In year the 1999, a feud between Tan Chong family has boiled over, threatening to unravel one of the country's oldest and richest dynasties. A two-year squabble between the children of brothers Tan Kim Hor and the late Tan Yuet Foh erupted into the open on Friday. Kim Hor's family filed a court petition to dissolve Tan Chong Consolidated Sdn Bhd, the holding company of the Tan Chong Group auto empire the two brothers set up in 1959. "Despite attempts to settle the differences between the two families, the relationship has irretrievably broken down," Kim Hor said in a statement. The nature and cause of the dispute was not made public. Ownership of Tan Chong Consolidated is currently split between the two branches of the family at a 55:45 percent ratio, with Kim Hor's side holding the smaller slice. The firm is the parent of four listed companies including flagship Tan Chong Motor Holdings, assembler and distributor of Nissan cars. Other firms under the Tan Chong stable are car parts maker APM Automotive Holdings, travel firm Warisan TC Holdings and Tan Chong International

In 2002, Tan Kim Hor, the co-founder of Malaysia's multi-billion-dollar Tan Chong Group, was thrown off the board of its flagship Tan Chong Motor Holdings and two other listed subsidiaries. The deed was done by other family members. It's the latest incident in an increasingly bitter family feud.

Tan Kim Hor, who co-founded the Tan Chong group together with his late brother Tan Sri Tan Yuet Foh, has passed in year 2016 at the age 92 years old. Tan Kim Hor was the Executive Chairman of Wawasan TKH Holdings Bhd., which was formed following a fallout with Yuet Foh's children. After a long drawn legal battle that went on from 2001 to 2009, the dispute was settled out of court, with the Tan Chong group splitting into Tan Chong Motor Holdings and Tan Chong International Limited. The Hong Kong listed Tan Chong International Limited owns Motor Image, which distributes Subaru vehicles in South East Asia, Taiwan, Hong Kong and China, as well as Tan Chong Motor, the distributor of Nissan vehicles in Singapore. Tan Kim Hor's son Dato' Tan Boon Pun and Dato' Tan Hoe Pin and Dr. Tan Ban Leong now runs Warisan TKH Holdings.

== Family dynasty ==
Brothers Tan Heng Chew, 69, Eng Soon, 68, and Eng Hwa, 62, control Tan Chong Motor Holdings, a conglomerate that assembles cars, makes parts, sells heavy machinery and operates Nissan and Renault dealerships. Heng Chew is the board president. Their late father, Tan Yuet Foh, was one of a group of brothers who founded a car distributor in 1957. That grew into Tan Chong and today it has subsidiaries in Vietnam, Laos, Thailand and Myanmar. It also controls affiliate Tan Chong International, which is listed in Hong Kong. Heng Chew's son Anthony Tan co-founded Uber competitor Grab, which is growing quickly in Southeast Asia.

Executive chairman shares fortune with family members, including brothers Tan Eng Soon and Tan Eng Hwa, who also sit on board of Tan Chong Motor Holdings.

== TCIE Vietnam Pte Ltd ==
Tan Chong which went into a joint venture agreement with Nissan Vietnam with the establishment TCIE Vietnam Pte Ltd took a turn when the Malaysian counterpart announced that it had commenced legal proceedings in 2019. The company with Tan Chong holding 74% and Nissan the remaining equity, were both in a legal dispute for the repayment of a loan of VND218 billion (equivalent to approximately US$9.4 million) together with interests pursuant to a Loan Agreement dated 5 June 2019. The claim was filed with the People's Court of Cau Giay District, Ha Noi City, Vietnam. According to Tan Chong, the company has decided to withdraw the claim as both parties resolve the matter amicably outside court.
