= Eupheme =

Eupheme may refer to:

- Eupheme (mythology), a daughter of Hephaestus and Aglaia in Orphic literature
- Eupheme (moon), a moon of Jupiter
- Epimelitta eupheme, a species of beetle in the family Cerambycidae
- Mitsubishi Eupheme EV, a 2019–present Chinese subcompact electric SUV
- Mitsubishi Eupheme PHEV, a 2018–present Chinese compact plug-in hybrid SUV
