= Epimelitta =

Scientific classification
- Kingdom: Animalia
- Phylum: Arthropoda
- Clade: Pancrustacea
- Class: Insecta
- Order: Coleoptera
- Suborder: Polyphaga
- Infraorder: Cucujiformia
- Family: Cerambycidae
- Tribe: Rhinotragini
- Genus: Epimelitta

Genus of beetles

Epimelitta is a genus of beetles in the family Cerambycidae, containing the following species:

- Epimelitta acutipennis Fisher, 1947
- Epimelitta aglaia (Newman, 1840)
- Epimelitta barbicrus (Kirby, 1818)
- Epimelitta bicolor (Bates, 1873)
- Epimelitta bleuzeni Penaherrera-Leiva & Tavakilian, 2003
- Epimelitta consobrina Melzer, 1931
- Epimelitta debilis (Gounelle, 1911)
- Epimelitta durantoni Penaherrera-Leiva & Tavakilian, 2003
- Epimelitta eupheme (Lameere, 1884)
- Epimelitta euphrosyne (Newman, 1840)
- Epimelitta laticornis (Klug, 1825)
- Epimelitta lestradei Penaherrera-Leiva & Tavakilian, 2003
- Epimelitta longipennis Zajciw, 1963
- Epimelitta manni (Fisher, 1930)
- Epimelitta melanaria (Gounelle, 1911)
- Epimelitta meliponica Bates, 1870
- Epimelitta mimica (Bates, 1873)
- Epimelitta mneme (Newman, 1841)
- Epimelitta nigerrima (Bates, 1892)
- Epimelitta ornaticollis (Zajciw, 1973)
- Epimelitta postimelina Giesbert, 1996
- Epimelitta rufiventris Bates, 1870
- Epimelitta scoparia (Klug, 1825)
- Epimelitta triangularis Fuchs, 1961

== Selected former species ==
- Epimelitta viridimicans Fisher, 1952
