= Paraphygopoda albitarsis =

Scientific classification
- Domain: Eukaryota
- Kingdom: Animalia
- Phylum: Arthropoda
- Class: Insecta
- Order: Coleoptera
- Suborder: Polyphaga
- Infraorder: Cucujiformia
- Family: Cerambycidae
- Genus: Paraphygopoda
- Species: P. albitarsis

Binomial name
- Paraphygopoda albitarsis (Klug, 1825)

Synonyms
- Acyphoderes albitarsis Lacordaire, 1868; Phygopoda albitarsis Bates, 1873; Stenopterus albitarsis Klug, 1825; Epimelitta viridimicans Zajciw, 1960; Odontocera albitarsis White, 1855

Species of beetle

Paraphygopoda albitarsis is a species of beetle in the family Cerambycidae. It was described by Johann Christoph Friedrich Klug in 1825.
