= Epimelitta postimelina =

Scientific classification
- Domain: Eukaryota
- Kingdom: Animalia
- Phylum: Arthropoda
- Class: Insecta
- Order: Coleoptera
- Suborder: Polyphaga
- Infraorder: Cucujiformia
- Family: Cerambycidae
- Genus: Epimelitta
- Species: E. postimelina

Binomial name
- Epimelitta postimelina Giesbert, 1996

Species of beetle

Epimelitta postimelina is a species of beetle in the family Cerambycidae. It was described by Giesbert in 1996.
