= Epimelitta bleuzeni =

Scientific classification
- Domain: Eukaryota
- Kingdom: Animalia
- Phylum: Arthropoda
- Class: Insecta
- Order: Coleoptera
- Suborder: Polyphaga
- Infraorder: Cucujiformia
- Family: Cerambycidae
- Genus: Epimelitta
- Species: E. bleuzeni

Binomial name
- Epimelitta bleuzeni Penaherrera-Leiva & Tavakilian, 2003

Species of beetle

Epimelitta bleuzeni is a species of beetle in the family Cerambycidae. It was described by Penaherrera-Leiva and Tavakilian in 2003.
