= Paraphygopoda =

Scientific classification
- Kingdom: Animalia
- Phylum: Arthropoda
- Clade: Pancrustacea
- Class: Insecta
- Order: Coleoptera
- Suborder: Polyphaga
- Infraorder: Cucujiformia
- Family: Cerambycidae
- Subfamily: Cerambycinae
- Tribe: Rhinotragini
- Genus: Paraphygopoda; Clarke, 2014

Genus of beetles

Paraphygopoda is a genus of beetles belonging to the family Cerambycidae.

== Species ==
- Paraphygopoda albitarsis (Klug, 1825)
- Paraphygopoda nappae Clarke, 2014
- Paraphygopoda viridimicans (Fisher, 1952)
