= Epimelitta ornaticollis =

Scientific classification
- Domain: Eukaryota
- Kingdom: Animalia
- Phylum: Arthropoda
- Class: Insecta
- Order: Coleoptera
- Suborder: Polyphaga
- Infraorder: Cucujiformia
- Family: Cerambycidae
- Genus: Epimelitta
- Species: E. ornaticollis

Binomial name
- Epimelitta ornaticollis (Zajciw, 1973)

Species of beetle

Epimelitta ornaticollis is a species of beetle in the family Cerambycidae. It was described by Zajciw in 1973.
