= Epimelitta consobrina =

Scientific classification
- Kingdom: Animalia
- Phylum: Arthropoda
- Class: Insecta
- Order: Coleoptera
- Suborder: Polyphaga
- Infraorder: Cucujiformia
- Family: Cerambycidae
- Genus: Epimelitta
- Species: E. consobrina

Binomial name
- Epimelitta consobrina Melzer, 1931

Species of beetle

Epimelitta consobrina is a species of beetle in the family Cerambycidae. It was described by Melzer in 1931.
