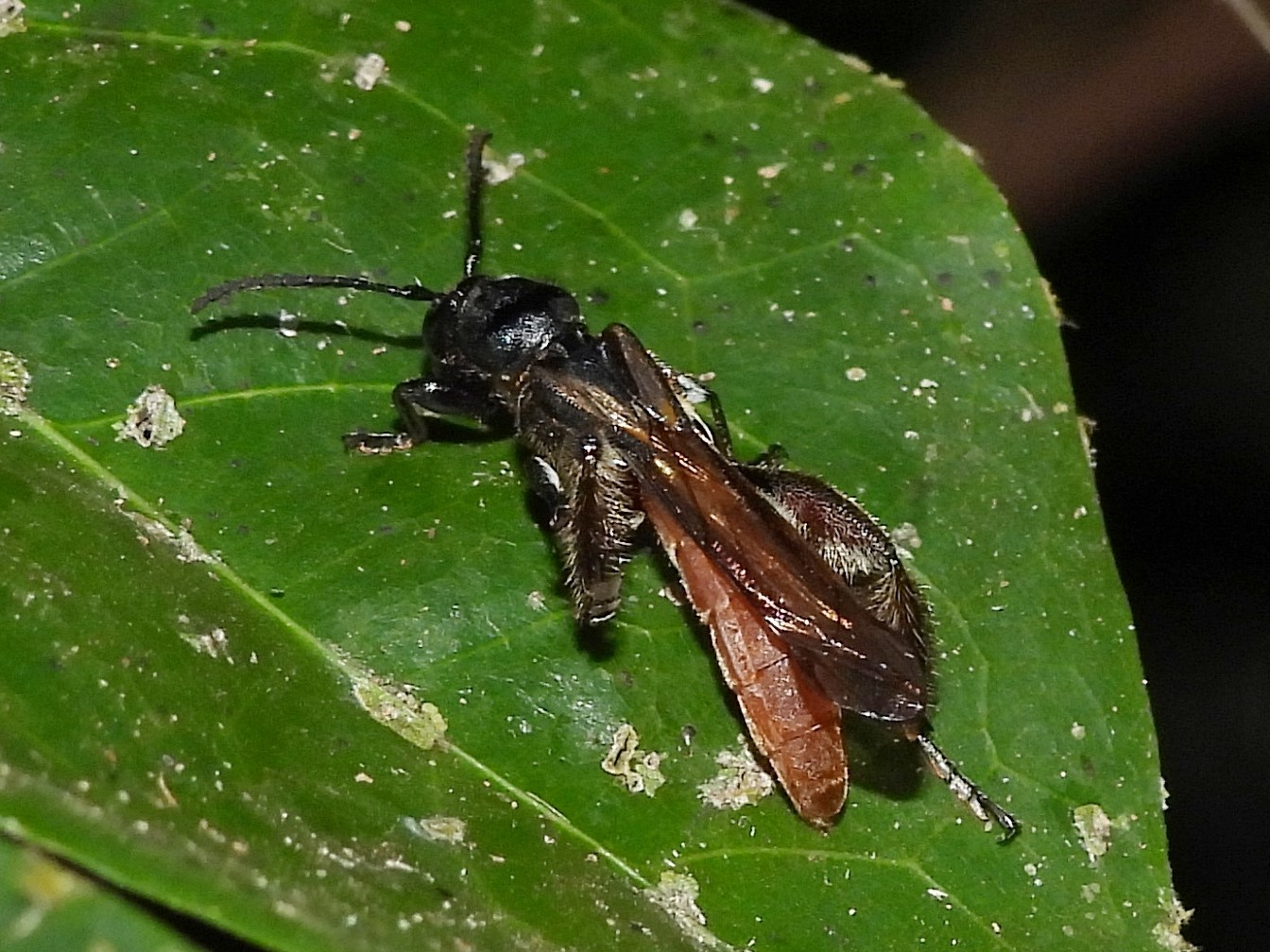

Scientific classification
- Kingdom: Animalia
- Phylum: Arthropoda
- Clade: Pancrustacea
- Class: Insecta
- Order: Coleoptera
- Suborder: Polyphaga
- Infraorder: Cucujiformia
- Family: Cerambycidae
- Genus: Epimelitta
- Species: E. rufiventris

Binomial name
- Epimelitta rufiventris Bates, 1870

= Epimelitta rufiventris =

Species of beetle

Epimelitta rufiventris is a species of beetle in the family Cerambycidae. It was described by Bates in 1870.
