= Epimelitta nigerrima =

Scientific classification
- Domain: Eukaryota
- Kingdom: Animalia
- Phylum: Arthropoda
- Class: Insecta
- Order: Coleoptera
- Suborder: Polyphaga
- Infraorder: Cucujiformia
- Family: Cerambycidae
- Genus: Epimelitta
- Species: E. nigerrima

Binomial name
- Epimelitta nigerrima (Bates, 1892)

Species of beetle

Epimelitta nigerrima is a species of beetle in the family Cerambycidae. It was described by Bates in 1892.
