= Epimelitta mimica =

Scientific classification
- Domain: Eukaryota
- Kingdom: Animalia
- Phylum: Arthropoda
- Class: Insecta
- Order: Coleoptera
- Suborder: Polyphaga
- Infraorder: Cucujiformia
- Family: Cerambycidae
- Genus: Epimelitta
- Species: E. mimica

Binomial name
- Epimelitta mimica (Bates, 1873)

Species of beetle

Epimelitta mimica is a species of beetle in the family Cerambycidae. It was described by Bates in 1873.
