= Aion i60 =

Compact crossover SUV

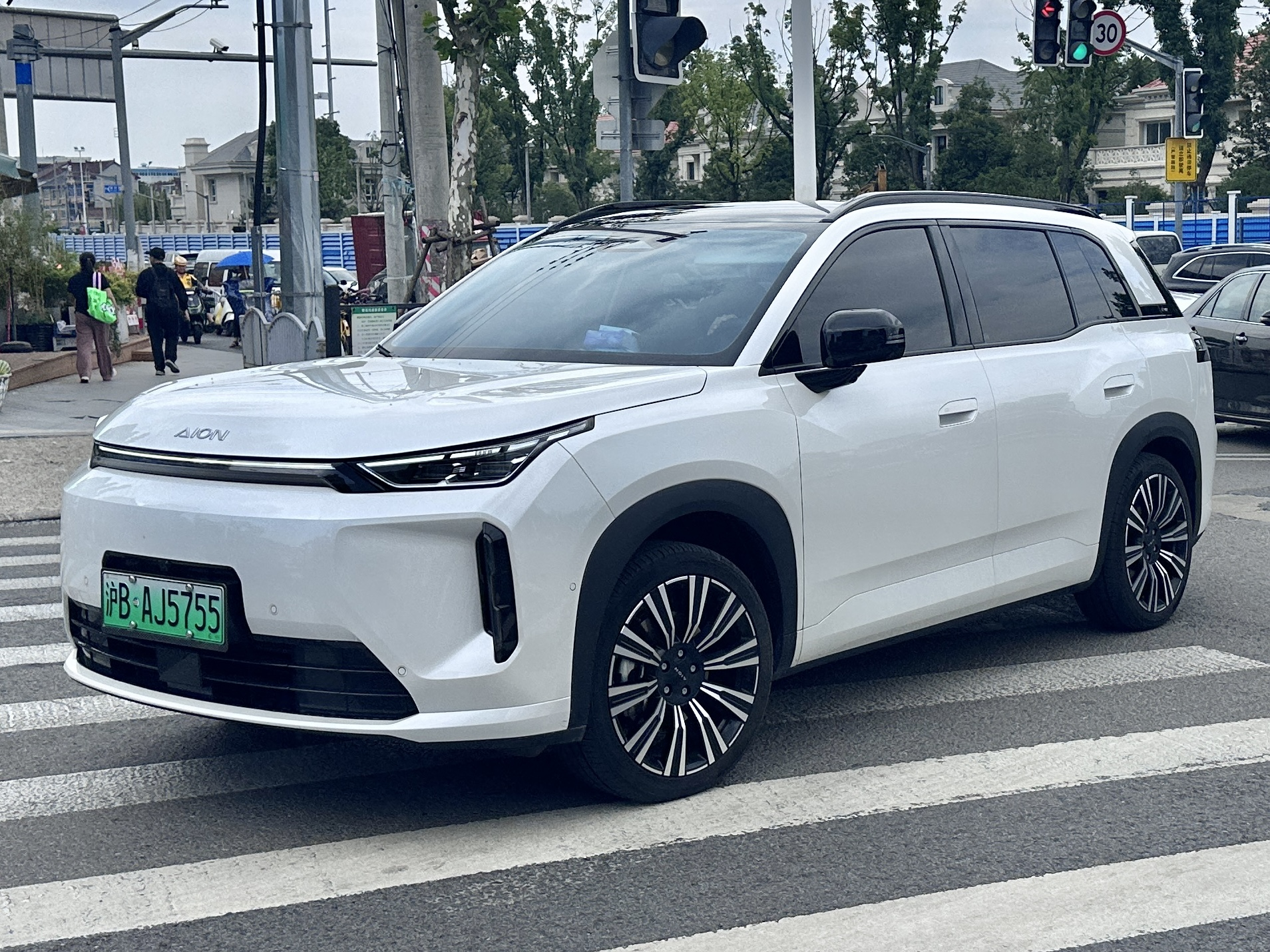

Overview
- Manufacturer: GAC Aion
- Production: October 2025 – present
- Assembly: China: Guangzhou; Indonesia: Purwakarta (National Assemblers); Thailand: Rayong (Aion Automobile Manufacturing (Thailand))

Body and chassis
- Class: Compact crossover SUV
- Body style: 5-door SUV
- Layout: Front-motor, front-wheel drive (EV); Front-engine, front-motor, front-wheel drive (EREV)
- Platform: AEP 3.0
- Related: Aion V; Toyota bZ3X; Trumpchi GS4 (fifth generation)

Powertrain
- Engine: Petrol range extender: 1.5 L 4A15K3 I4
- Electric motor: Permanent magnet synchronous
- Power output: 150–180 kW (201–241 hp)
- Hybrid drivetrain: Series hybrid range extender
- Battery: 29.16 kWh CATL LFP Magazine 2.0; 45.37 kWh LFP Zenergy/Inpow; 56.68 kWh LFP CATL; 62.2 kWh CATL LFP Magazine 2.0; 74.96/75.26 kWh CATL LFP Magazine 2.0; 77.65 kWh LFP Inpow
- Electric range: 520–700 km (323–435 mi) (CLTC, EV); 160–280 km (99–174 mi) (WLTP, EREV); 210–350 km (130–217 mi) (CLTC, EREV)

Dimensions
- Wheelbase: 2,775 mm (109.3 in)
- Length: 4,685 mm (184.4 in)
- Width: 1,854 mm (73.0 in)
- Height: 1,660 mm (65.4 in)
- Curb weight: 1,800–1,910 kg (3,968–4,211 lb)

The Aion i60 is a compact crossover SUV manufactured since 2025 by GAC Aion, subsidiary of GAC Group. The i60 is available in two powertrains, range extender electric (EREV) and battery electric (EV).

Heavily based on the second-generation Aion V EV, the i60 is GAC Aion's first-ever model equipped with optional range extender petrol engine.

== Overview ==
The i60 is available with both range-extended and battery electric powertrains. The EV version is equipped with an electric motor delivering a maximum power of 150 kW (201 hp; 204 PS) or 165 kW (221 hp; 224 PS).

The new extended-range version features a powertrain composed of a 1.5-litre range extender petrol engine with maximum power of 74 kW (99 hp; 101 PS). The electric motor is available with 150 kW (201 hp; 204 PS) or 165 kW (221 hp; 224 PS) option. It is equipped with a 29.165 kWh lithium iron phosphate battery pack, offering a WLTC pure electric range of 160 km (99 mi).

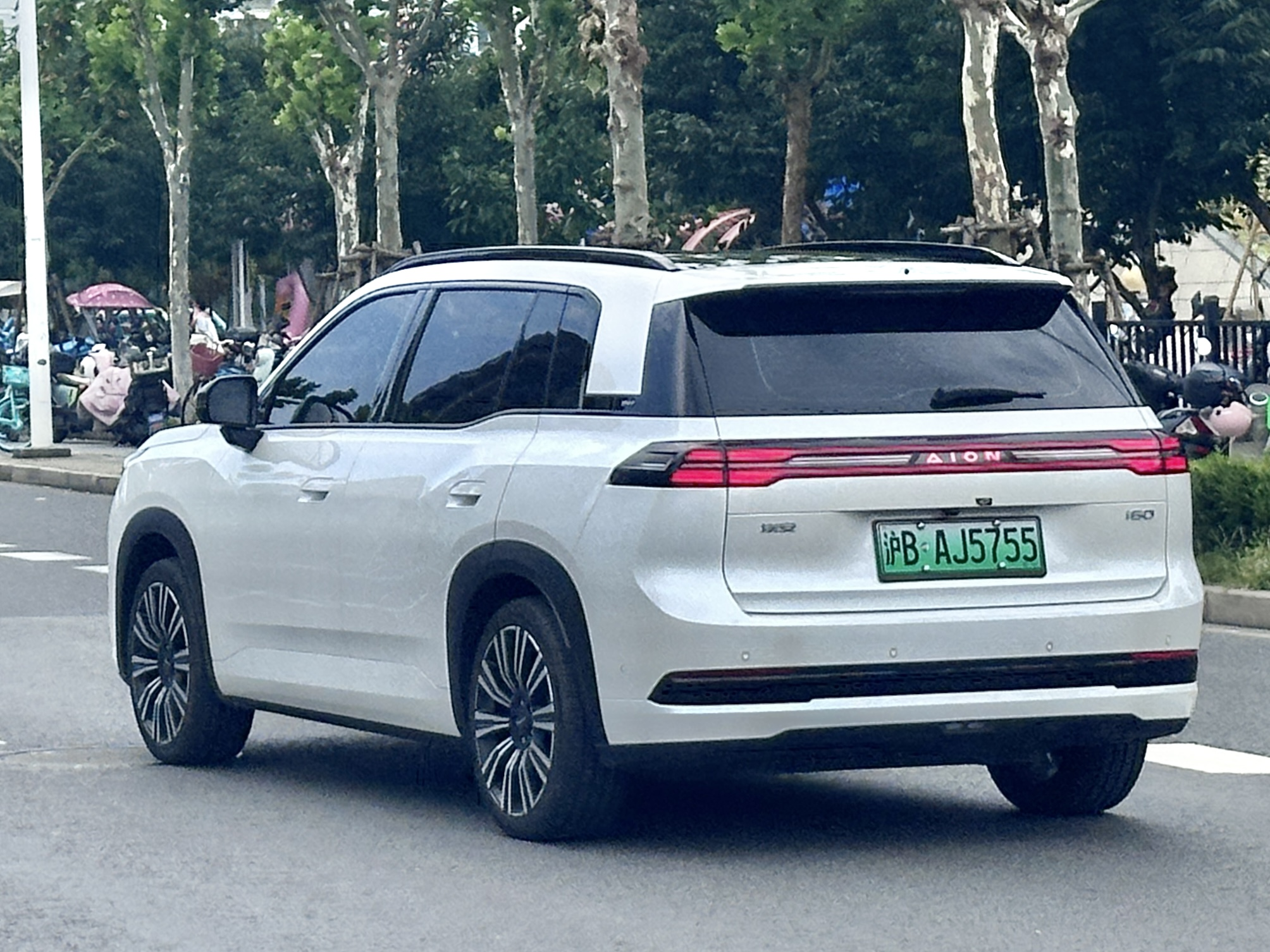
Rear view

=== 2027 update ===
The 2027 model year update was launched on 15 September 2026. The exterior receives no changes other than a new optional roof rack and the charging port moved to the rear due to customer feedback. The central infotainment display has been upgraded from a 14.6-inch to a 15.6-inch 2.5K-resolution display based on ADiGO 6.0, and a new projector option is available capable of a 110-inch image at a 5-meter distance. The EV variant now has a 66 L (2.3 cu ft) drainable frunk.

Both the electric and range-extender variants have new battery options available. Electric variants received a standard battery option which gets similar range to the previous standard batteries despite being significantly smaller, while the larger battery has a longer range rating of 700 kilometres (435 mi). Range extender variants comes with a much larger battery which also charges marginally faster, and combined with its 50 L (1.8 cu ft) fuel tank it has a combined range of 1,738 kilometres (1,080 mi).

== Markets ==
=== Indonesia ===
The i60 was launched on 7 November 2026, and offered with two variants. The i60 was locally assembled by Indomobil Group's subsidiary, National Assemblers. It is the right-hand debut of the Aion i60.

=== Thailand ===
The i60 was launched on 19 November 2026, sales beginning on 1 December 2026. Is offered with sole variant: Max.

== Powertrain ==
Specifications
Model year	Battery		Power	Torque	Electric range		30–80% charge	Top speed	Kerb weight
Model year	Type	Weight	Power	Torque	WLTP	CLTC	30–80% charge	Top speed	Kerb weight
Range extender
2026	29.165 kWh LFP CALB	239.5 kg (528 lb)	241 hp (180 kW; 244 PS)	235 N⋅m (173 lb⋅ft)	160 km (99 mi)	210 km (130 mi)	15 min	180 km/h (112 mph)	1,840 kg (4,057 lb)
2027	45.37 kWh LFP Zenergy/Inpow	323 kg (712 lb)	215 hp (160 kW; 218 PS)	280 N⋅m (207 lb⋅ft)	280 km (174 mi)	350 km (217 mi)	13.7 min	180 km/h (112 mph)	1,960 kg (4,321 lb)
Battery electric
2026	62.268 kWh LFP GAC Inpow	441 kg (972 lb)	201 hp (150 kW; 204 PS)	205 N⋅m (151 lb⋅ft)	—	530 km (329 mi)	22 min	160 km/h (99 mph)	1,800–1,840 kg (3,968–4,057 lb)
2026	64.619 kWh LFP CATL		201 hp (150 kW; 204 PS)	240 N⋅m (177 lb⋅ft)	—	530 km (329 mi)	22 min	160 km/h (99 mph)	1,745 kg (3,847 lb)
2026	74.96/75.26 kWh LFP CALB/Inpow	518 kg (1,142 lb)	221 hp (165 kW; 224 PS)	205 N⋅m (151 lb⋅ft)	—	650 km (404 mi)	22 min	160 km/h (99 mph)	1,910 kg (4,211 lb)
2027	56.68 kWh LFP CATL	408.1 kg (900 lb)	221 hp (165 kW; 224 PS)	205 N⋅m (151 lb⋅ft)	—	520 km (323 mi)	22 min	160 km/h (99 mph)	1,745–1,800 kg (3,847–3,968 lb)
2027	77.65 kWh LFP Inpow	515 kg (1,135 lb)	221 hp (165 kW; 224 PS)	205 N⋅m (151 lb⋅ft)	—	700 km (435 mi)	22 min	160 km/h (99 mph)	1,885–1,900 kg (4,156–4,189 lb)

== Sales ==
The 2027 model year i60 attracted over 5,000 pre-orders within 3 hours of its launch on 15 September 2026. GAC Aion announced that the i60 received 20,181 orders during September 2026.

Year	China	Indonesia	Thailand
2025	9,938		
2026			
2027			
