= Epimelitta triangularis =

Scientific classification
- Domain: Eukaryota
- Kingdom: Animalia
- Phylum: Arthropoda
- Class: Insecta
- Order: Coleoptera
- Suborder: Polyphaga
- Infraorder: Cucujiformia
- Family: Cerambycidae
- Genus: Epimelitta
- Species: E. triangularis

Binomial name
- Epimelitta triangularis E. Fuchs, 1961

Species of beetle

Epimelitta triangularis is a species of beetle in the family Cerambycidae. It was described by Ernst Fuchs in 1961.
