= GAC Emkoo =

Compact crossover SUV

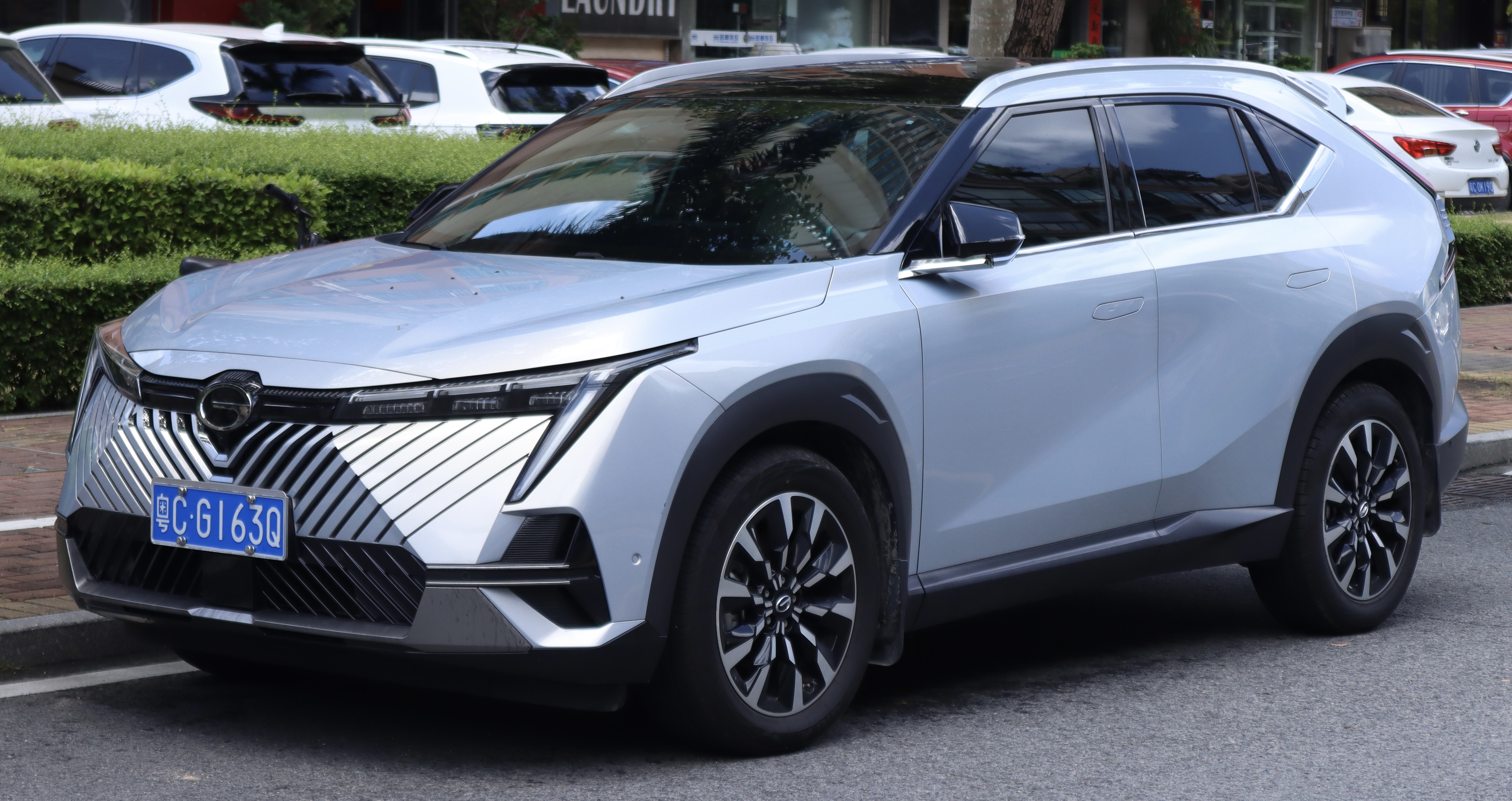
- 2022 Trumpchi Emkoo

Overview
- Manufacturer: GAC Motor
- Also called: Trumpchi Emkoo (China); GAC GS4 (Brazil); Itala 56 (Italy)
- Production: 2022–2025 (China); 2022–present (export)
- Assembly: China: Guangzhou; Malaysia: Kuala Lumpur (TCMA)

Body and chassis
- Class: Compact SUV (C-segment)
- Body style: 5-door crossover SUV
- Platform: GAC Global Platform Modular Architecture (GMPA)
- Related: Trumpchi GS4 III

Powertrain
- Engine: Petrol: 1.5 L 4A15J2 turbo I4; 2.0 L 4B20J1 turbo I4; Petrol hybrid: 2.0 L 4B20L1 I4
- Electric motor: 1x AC PMSM (hybrid)
- Power output: 130 kW (177 PS; 174 hp) (1.5 L); 185 kW (252 PS; 248 hp) (2.0 L); 175 kW (238 PS; 235 hp) (2.0 L Hybrid)
- Transmission: 7-speed DCT; 8-speed automatic; 2-speed DHT
- Hybrid drivetrain: Parallel (hybrid)
- Battery: 2.076 kWh li-ion battery (hybrid)

Dimensions
- Wheelbase: 2,750 mm (108.3 in)
- Length: 4,680 mm (184.3 in)
- Width: 1,901 mm (74.8 in)
- Height: 1,670 mm (65.7 in)
- Kerb weight: 1,500–1,625 kg (3,307–3,583 lb); 1,670 kg (3,682 lb) (hybrid)

Chronology
- Successor: Trumpchi GS4 Max (China)

The GAC Emkoo or Trumpchi Emkoo (Chinese: 影酷; pinyin: Yǐngkù, literally: Shadow Cool) is a compact SUV produced by Chinese automobile manufacturer GAC Group and sold under the Trumpchi brand in China and the GAC Motor brand globally. It is the second vehicle of the Trumpchi Shadow (影) series, after the Empow compact sports sedan.

== Overview ==
The vehicle was previewed by the Vision Emkoo concept car revealed in November 2021 at Auto Guangzhou.

The production model debuted as the Trumpchi Emkoo in April 2022, with similar toned-down styling compared to the 2021 concept. The vehicle went on sale in China in August 2022.

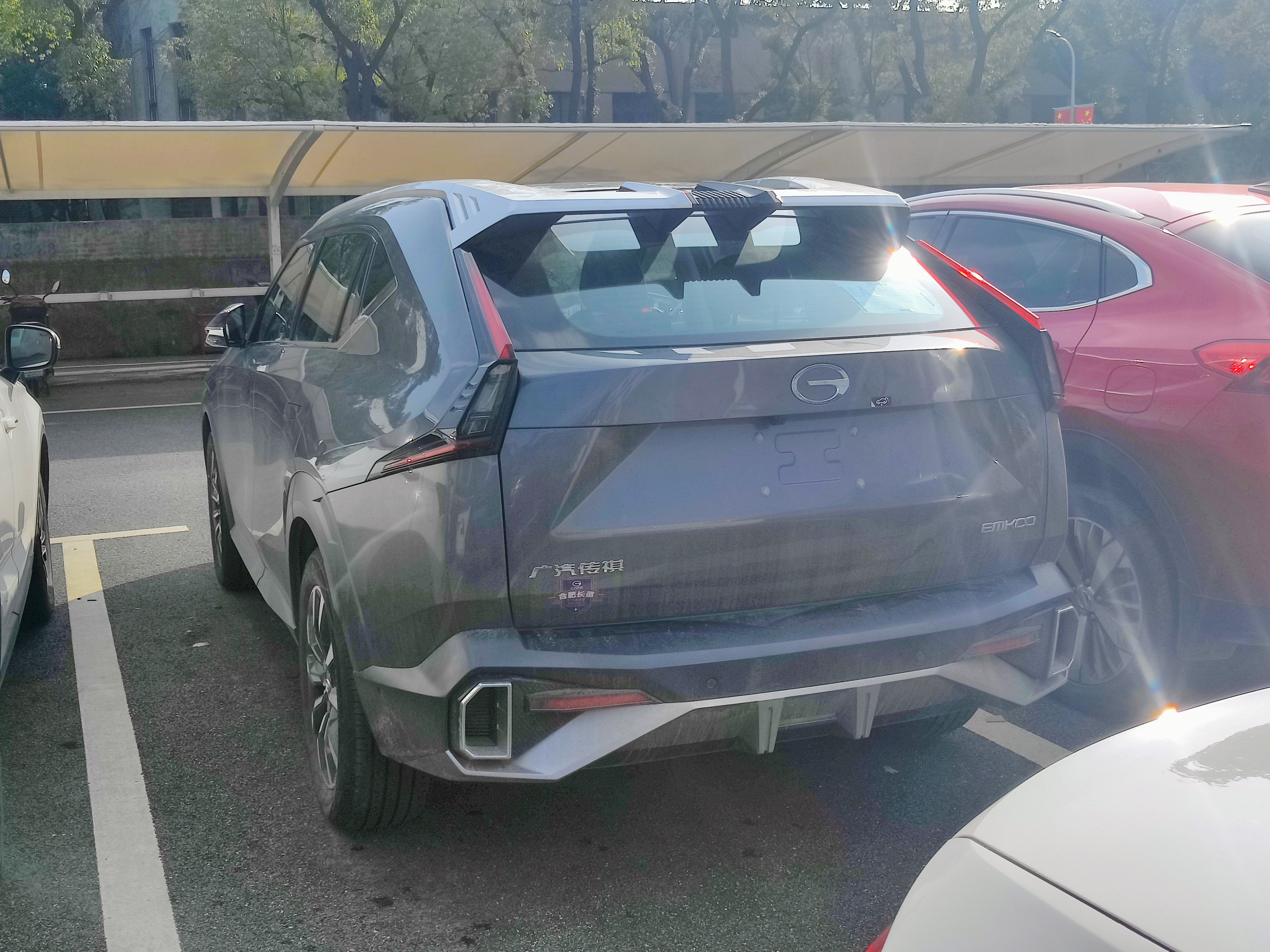
Rear view

== Markets ==
=== Brunei ===
The Emkoo was launched in Brunei on 6 February 2026 alongside with the M8, in a sole variant powered by a 1.5-litre turbocharged petrol engine.

=== Malaysia ===
The Emkoo was first introduced in Malaysia in January 2024, and was launched in Malaysia on 3 October 2025. It is available in two variants: Premium and Premium Pro, both variants are powered by the 1.5-litre turbocharged petrol engine. It is locally assembled in Segambut, Kuala Lumpur at the Tan Chong Motor plant.

=== Mexico ===
The Emkoo was launched in Mexico on 21 January 2025, with three variants: GE, GL and HEV, it is powered by either 1.5-litre turbocharged petrol or 2.0-litre Hybrid powertrains.

=== Philippines ===
The Emkoo was previewed for the Philippine market at the 19th Manila International Auto Show (MIAS) on 4 April 2024 and sales commenced in the Philippines on 22 August 2024. It is available in a sole variant powered by a 2.0-litre Hybrid powertrain, as the first hybrid electric vehicle (HEV) sold by GAC Group in the country.

=== South Africa ===
The Emkoo was launched in South Africa on 28 August 2024, shortly two weeks after GAC Group entry to South Africa with the GS3 Emzoom. It is available in two trim levels: Executive and Executive Plus; it is powered by a 1.5-litre turbocharged petrol engine.

== Specifications ==
=== Powertrain ===
The vehicle is available with two internal combustion engines. The entry-level model is powered by a 1.5-litre turbocharged petrol engine, producing 130 kW (177 PS; 174 hp) and 270 N⋅m (199 lb⋅ft; 28 kg⋅m) of torque and is paired with a 7-speed dual-clutch transmission, while the top-level model is powered by a 2.0-litre turbocharged petrol engine, producing 185 kW (252 PS; 248 hp) and 400 N⋅m (295 lb⋅ft; 41 kg⋅m) of torque and has an 8-speed automatic transmission.

The hybrid model is powered by a 2.0-litre petrol engine with an electric motor outputting a combined 175 kW (238 PS; 235 hp) is co-developed by GAC and Toyota called the G-MC 2.0 system. This model uses a 2-speed dedicated hybrid transmission.

Specs
Model	Years	Transmission	Power@rpm	Torque@rpm	Top speed
Petrol
1.5 Turbo	2022–present	7-speed DCT	130 kW (177 PS; 174 hp) at 5,500 rpm	270 N⋅m (199 lb⋅ft; 28 kg⋅m) at 1,400–4,500 rpm	190 km/h (118 mph)
2.0 Turbo	2022–present	8-speed automatic	185 kW (252 PS; 248 hp) at 5,250 rpm	400 N⋅m (295 lb⋅ft; 41 kg⋅m) at 1,750–4,000 rpm	210 km/h (130 mph)
Hybrid
2.0 Hybrid	2022–present	2-speed DHT	175 kW (238 PS; 235 hp)		160 km/h (99 mph)

=== Technology ===
The vehicle features an ADiGO 5.0 advanced driver-assistance system and a 14.6 in (37 cm) central screen using a Qualcomm Snapdragon 8155 chip.

== Safety ==
ASEAN NCAP test results GAC Emkoo (2025)
Test	Points
Overall:	5 /5 stars
Adult occupant:	37.88
Child occupant:	16.01
Safety assist:	18.57
Motorcyclist Safety:	12.50

== Sales ==
Year	China
2023	34,384
2024	13,056
2025	1,046
