= Epimelitta manni =

Scientific classification
- Domain: Eukaryota
- Kingdom: Animalia
- Phylum: Arthropoda
- Class: Insecta
- Order: Coleoptera
- Suborder: Polyphaga
- Infraorder: Cucujiformia
- Family: Cerambycidae
- Genus: Epimelitta
- Species: E. manni

Binomial name
- Epimelitta manni (Fisher, 1930)

Species of beetle

Epimelitta manni is a species of beetle in the family Cerambycidae. It was described by Fisher in 1930.
