= Epimelitta mneme =

Scientific classification
- Domain: Eukaryota
- Kingdom: Animalia
- Phylum: Arthropoda
- Class: Insecta
- Order: Coleoptera
- Suborder: Polyphaga
- Infraorder: Cucujiformia
- Family: Cerambycidae
- Genus: Epimelitta
- Species: E. mneme

Binomial name
- Epimelitta mneme (Newman, 1841)

Species of beetle

Epimelitta mneme is a species of beetle in the family Cerambycidae. It was described by Newman in 1841.
