= Epimelitta scoparia =

Scientific classification
- Domain: Eukaryota
- Kingdom: Animalia
- Phylum: Arthropoda
- Class: Insecta
- Order: Coleoptera
- Suborder: Polyphaga
- Infraorder: Cucujiformia
- Family: Cerambycidae
- Genus: Epimelitta
- Species: E. scoparia

Binomial name
- Epimelitta scoparia (Klug, 1825)

Species of beetle

Epimelitta scoparia is a species of beetle in the family Cerambycidae. It was described by Johann Christoph Friedrich Klug in 1825.
