= Trumpchi GS4 =

Chinese compact crossover SUV

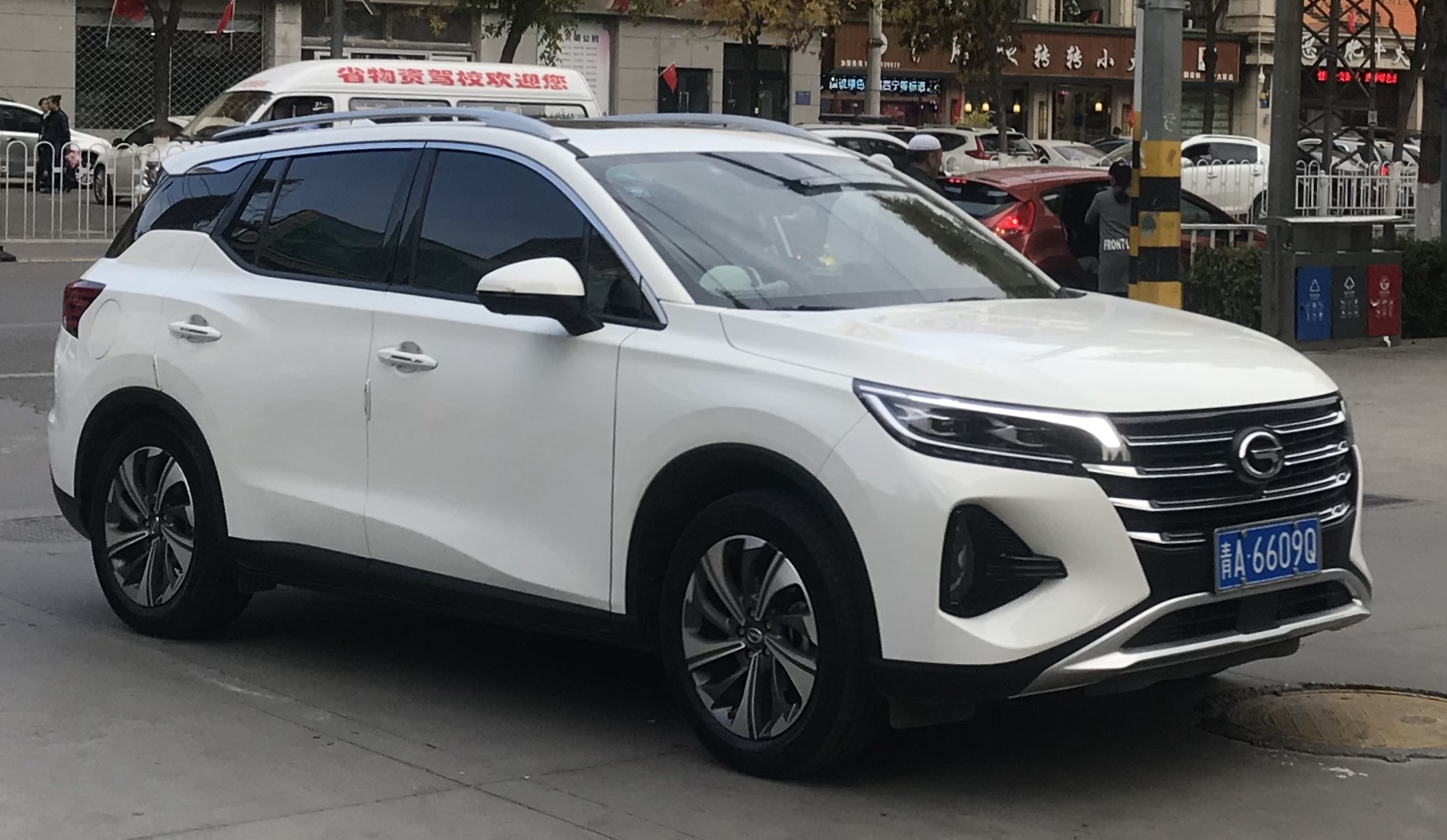
- 2019 Trumpchi GS4

Overview
- Manufacturer: GAC Group
- Production: 2015–present
- Assembly: Guangzhou, China (first generation); Yichang, China (second generation)

Body and chassis
- Class: Compact SUV
- Body style: 5-door SUV
- Layout: Front-engine, front-wheel-drive

The Trumpchi GS4 is a compact SUV of the late-2010s produced by GAC Group under the Trumpchi brand in China and the GAC Motor brand globally.

The first generation was launched in 2015, and was available as a gasoline variant, a plug-in hybrid electric variant and a pure electric variant. The plug-in hybrid electric variant was sold by the GAC Mitsubishi joint venture under the Eupheme brand as the Eupheme PHEV, and by GAC Honda joint venture under the GAC Honda brand as the Shirui PHEV. Both variants feature restyled front and rear end designs while still wears the GAC badge. The pure electric version was rebadged by the GAC Toyota joint venture under the Leahead brand as the Leahead ix4.

The second generation was launched in 2019, and was offered as a regular SUV bodystyle and a fastback SUV called the GS4 Coupe.

The third generation launched in 2024 as GS4 Max, a redesigned variant of Emkoo, replacing the second generation of GS4 and GS4 Plus.

The fourth generation was launched in 2026, being essentially a redesigned variant of i60, replacing the third generation of GS4.

== First generation (A28/A32) (2015) ==
Trumpchi GS4 I (A28/A32)
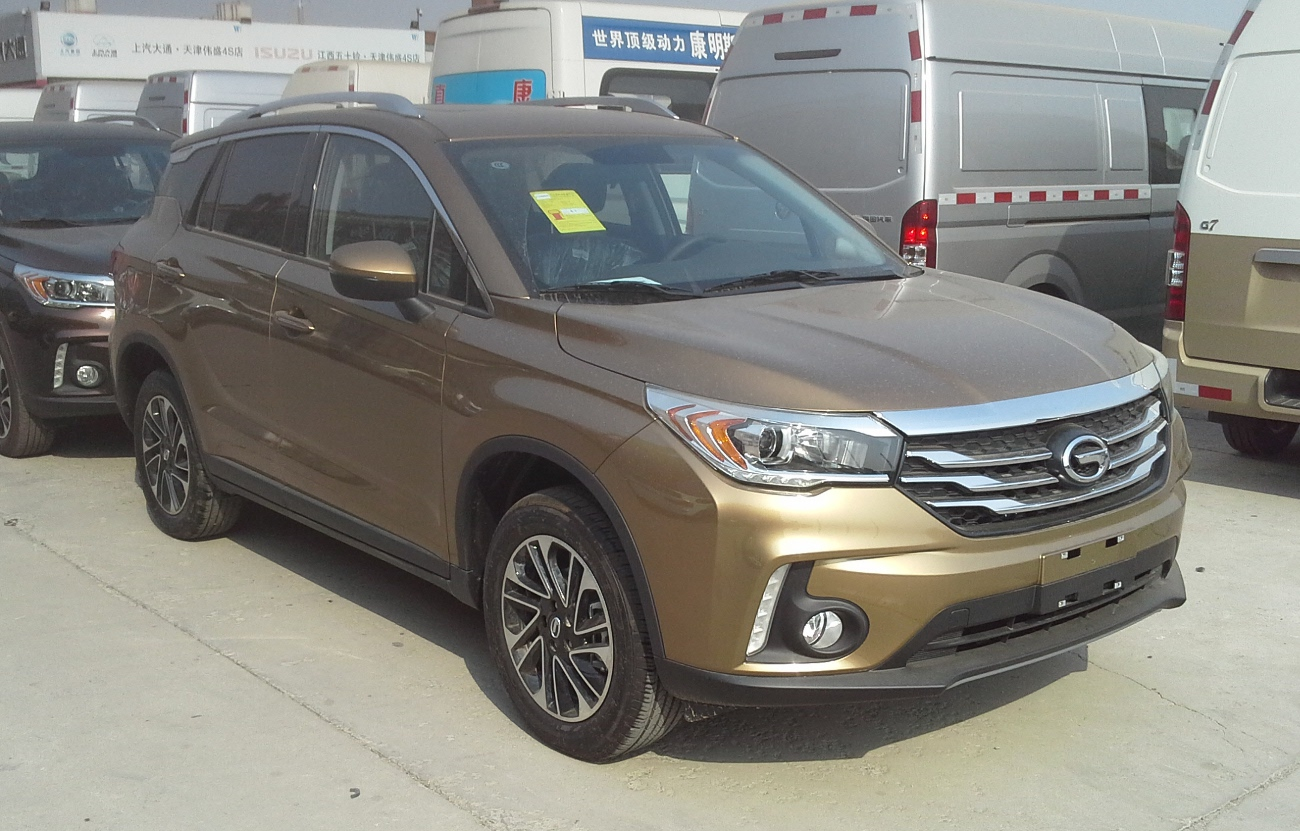

Overview
- Also called: GAC GS4; Trumpchi GS4 EV; Trumpchi GS4 PHEV; GAC Mitsubishi Eupheme (PHEV); GAC-FCA Yuejie (PHEV); GAC Toyota/Leahead iX4 (EV); GAC Honda/Everus Shirui (PHEV)
- Production: 2015–2019
- Model years: 2015–2019
- Designer: Zhang Fan

Body and chassis
- Platform: GAC AF Platform
- Related: Trumpchi GA3S

Powertrain
- Engine: 1.3 L 4A13M1 turbo I4 (gasoline); 1.5 L 4A15M1 turbo I4 (gasoline); 1.5 L 4A15J1 turbo GDI I4 (gasoline); 1.5 L 4A15K2 (PHEV)
- Electric motor: 180 PS (132 kW; 178 hp) permanent magnet motor/generator, torque 300 N⋅m (221 lb⋅ft) (GS4 PHEV); 180 PS (132 kW; 178 hp) TZ220XSA5H01 permanent magnet motor/generator (GAC Toyota iX4)
- Transmission: 5-speed manual; 6-speed manual; 7-speed C725 DCT; 6-speed Aisin 6F25 automatic
- Hybrid drivetrain: PHEV
- Battery: 12 kWh ternary lithium battery; 46 kWh Li-ion (GS4 EV / Toyota iX4)

Dimensions
- Wheelbase: 2,650 mm (104.3 in)
- Length: 4,510 mm (177.6 in)
- Width: 1,852 mm (72.9 in)
- Height: 1,677 mm (66.0 in)

The first generation Trumpchi GS4 debuted as a pre-production concept on the 2015 North American International Auto Show. This final production version debuted on the 2015 Auto Shanghai and was later launched in the Chinese auto market. Codename A28. The GS4 is based on the same platform as the GA3S sedan and is positioned between the GS3 and GS5. Pricing ranges from around 80,000 yuan to around 120,000 yuan ($13,000 – 19,360). The GS4 was on display along with the rest of the Trumpchi lineup at the 2017 Detroit Auto Show, with GAC Group claiming it would cost less than the Toyota RAV4 if it were to be sold in North America.

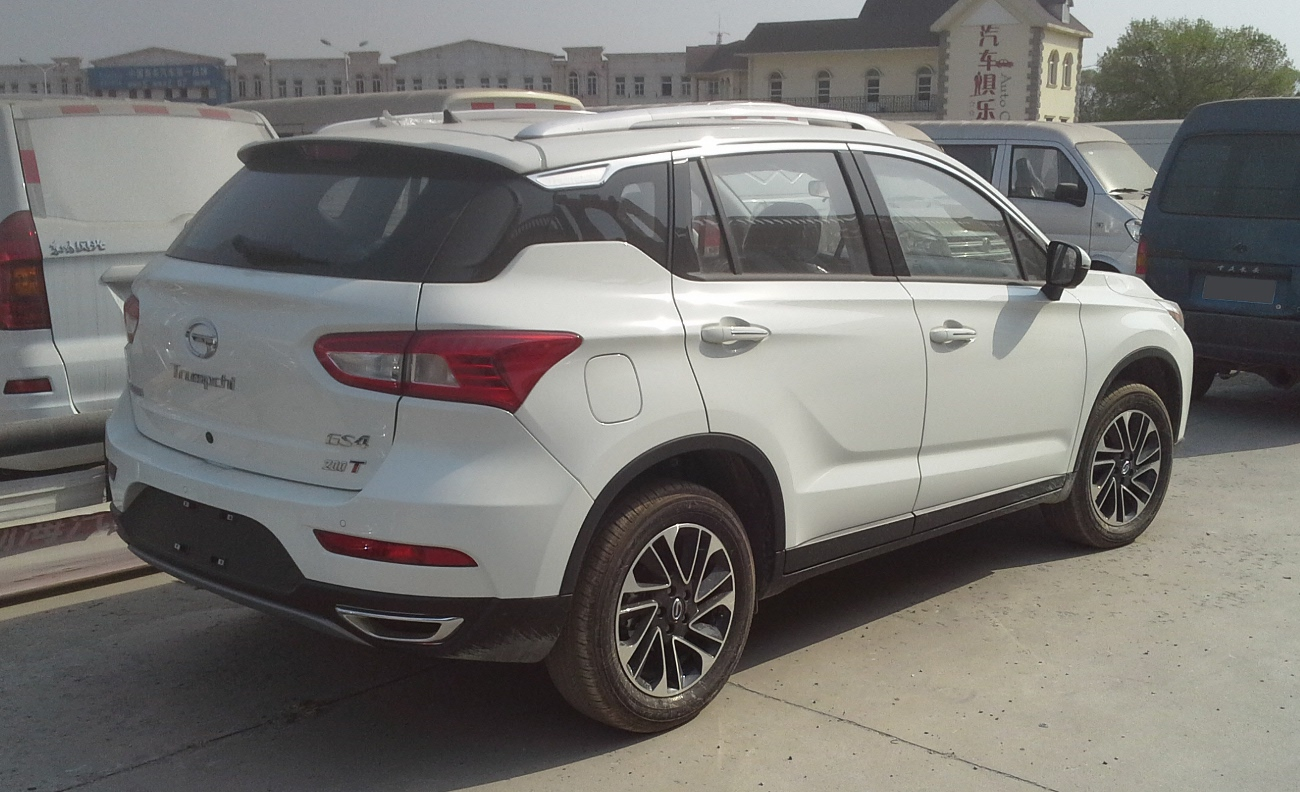
GAC Trumpchi GS4 rear

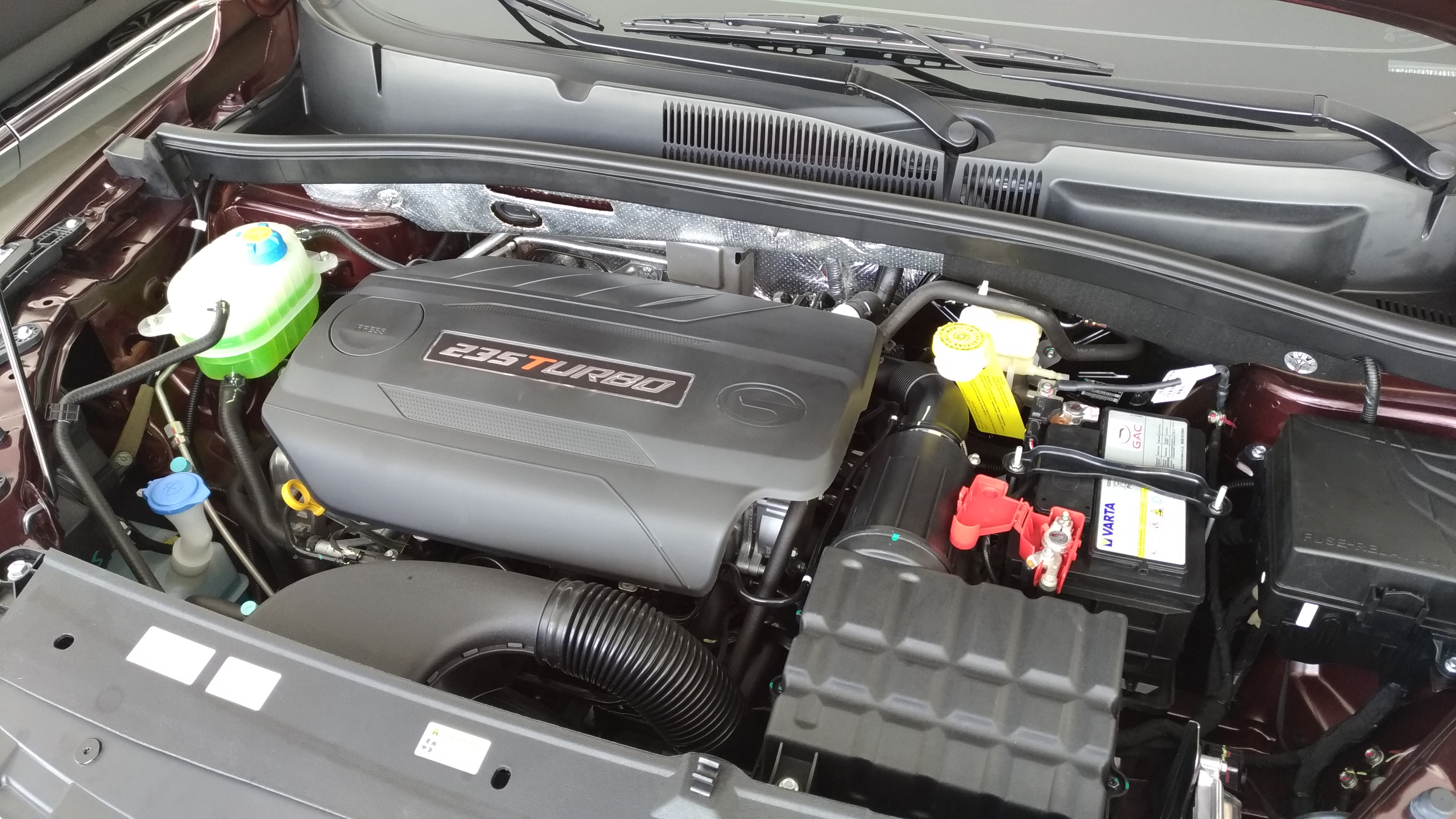
GAC GS4 engine bay (Philippines)

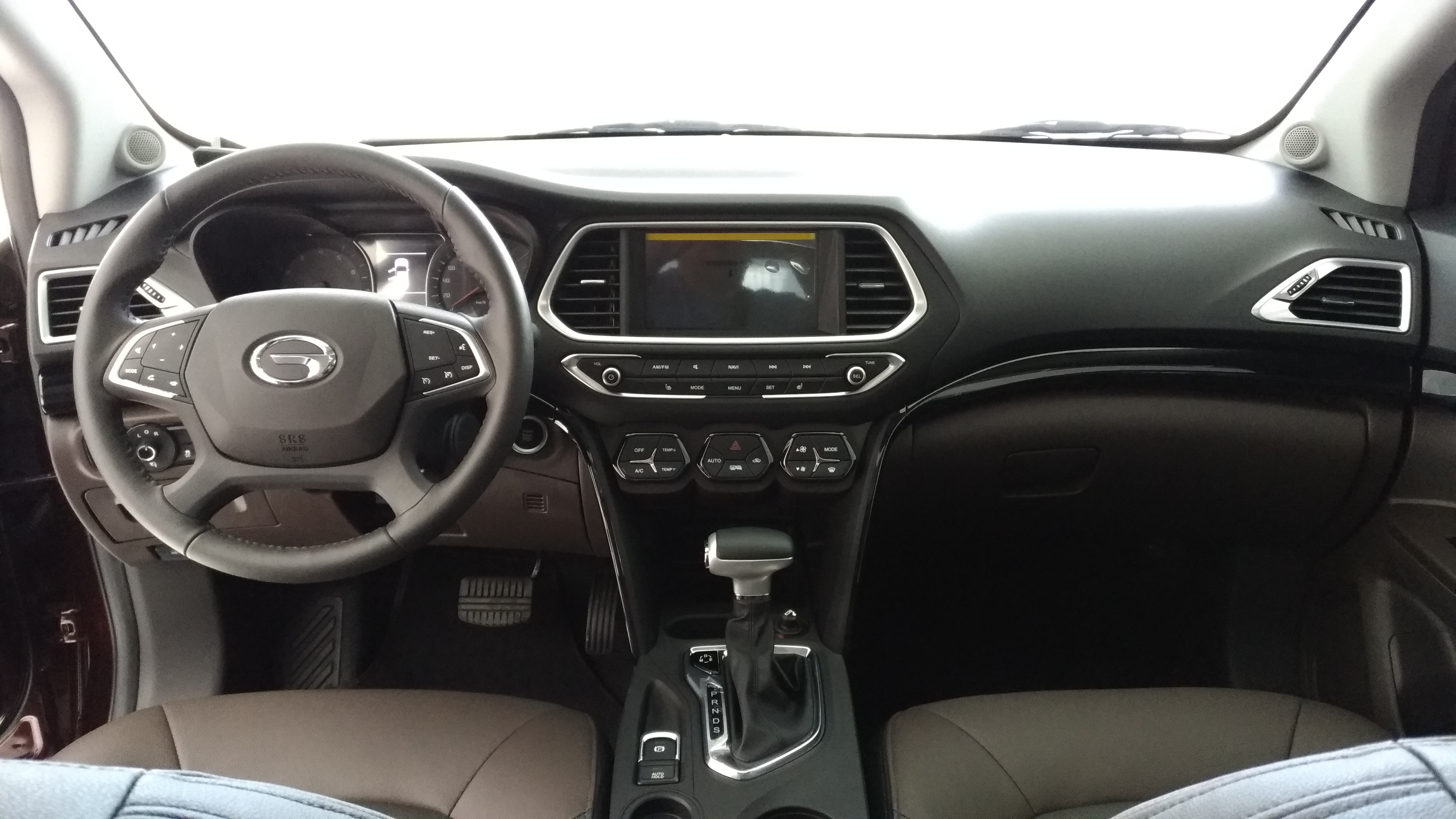
GAC GS4 interior (Philippines)

=== Trumpchi GS4 EV ===
The Trumpchi GS4 EV is a new electric vehicle debuted on the 2015 Guangzhou Auto Show and based on the Trumpchi GS4. It was launched on the Chinese car market during the second half of 2016. The GS4 EV is powered by an electric motor producing 140 hp and 250 nm and is capable of a range of 240 kilometer. The top speed of the GS4 EV is 120 kilometer per hour and 0–100 km/h acceleration is under 11 seconds. Charging takes 12 hours for a full charge on 220V or 30 minutes for an 80% battery on a fast charger. The GS4 EV model is also sold by GAC Toyota in China under the Leahead brand as the "Leahead ix4".

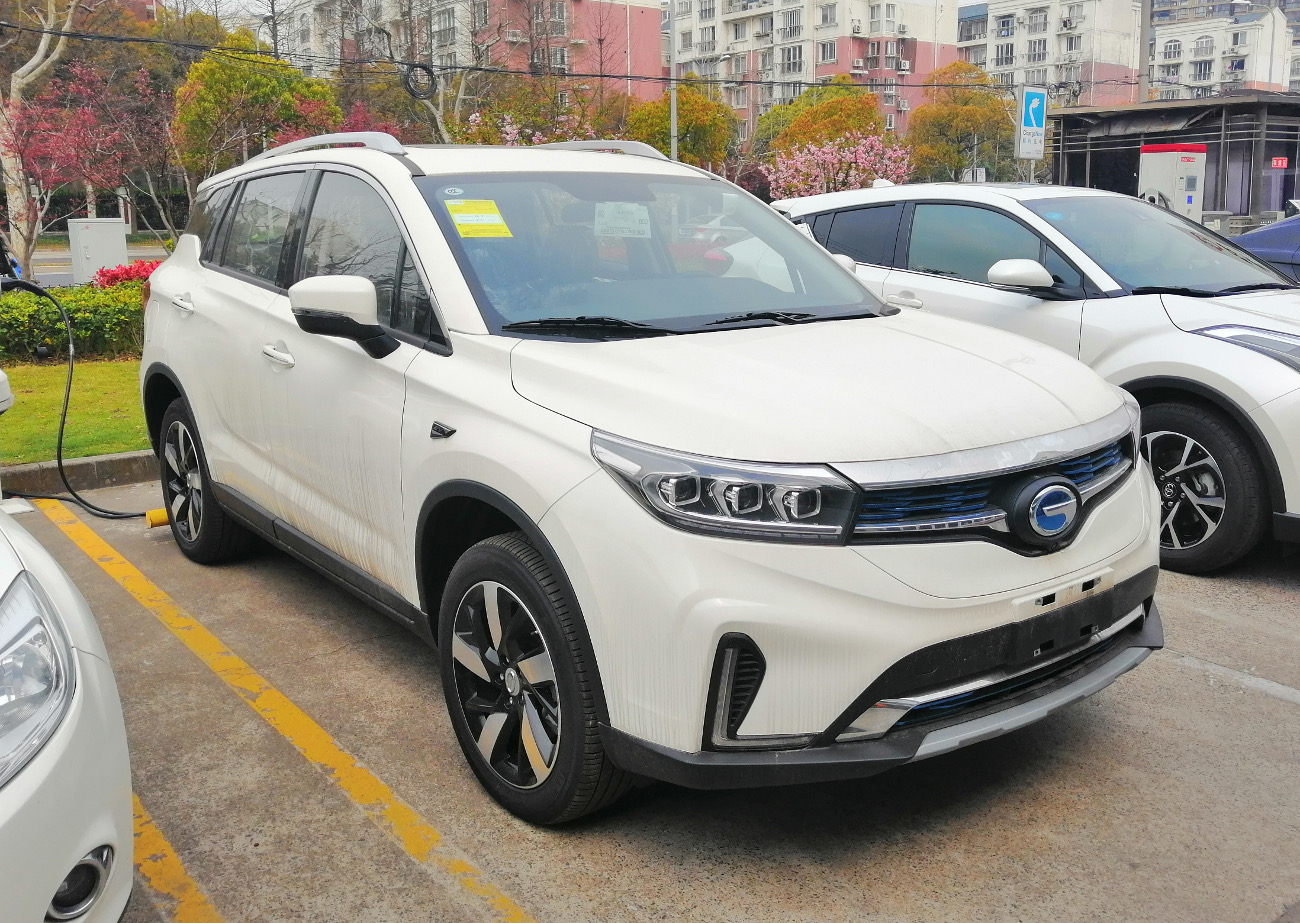
GAC-Toyota Leahead ix4

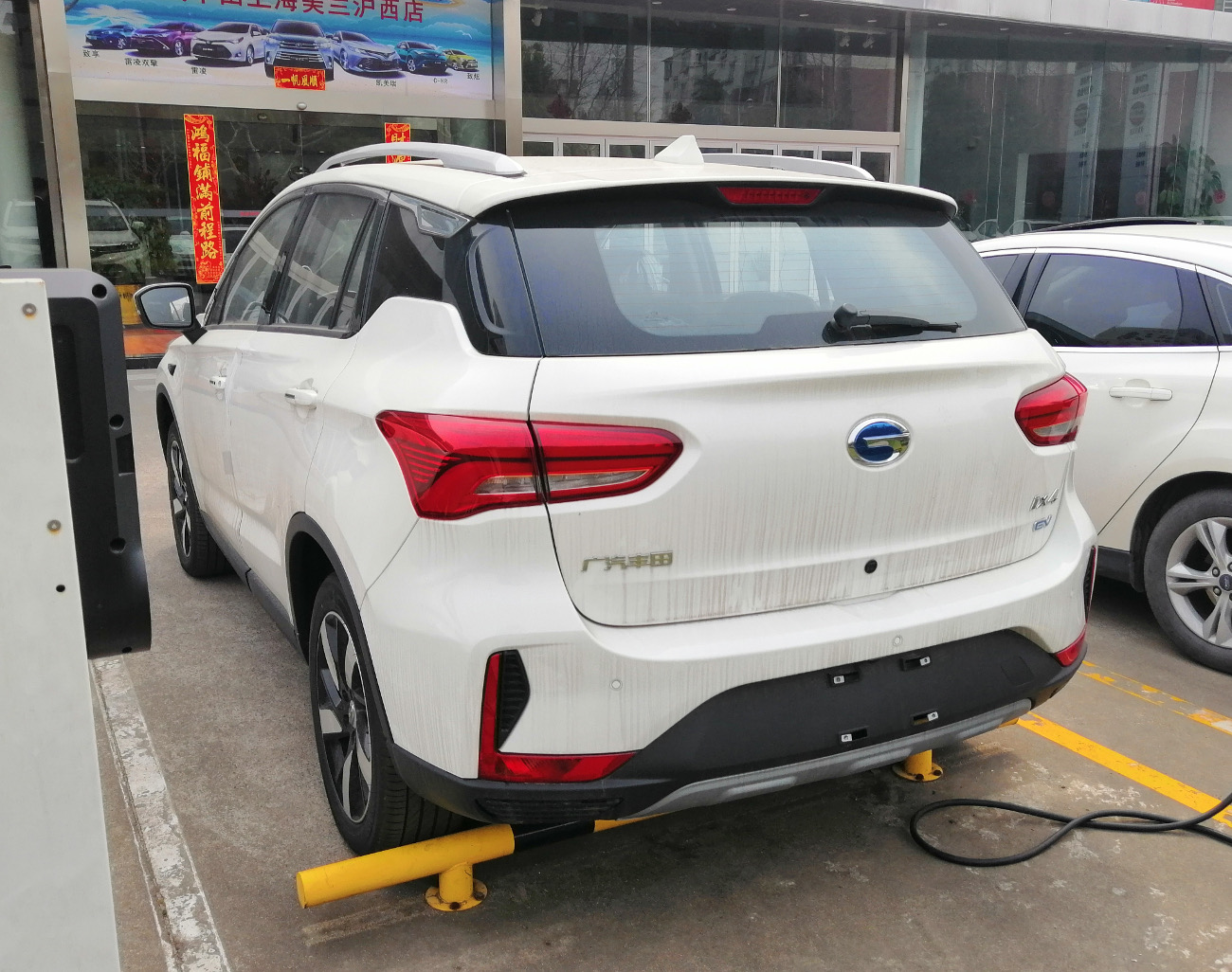
GAC-Toyota Leahead ix4

=== Trumpchi GS4 PHEV ===
The Trumpchi GS4 PHEV is the plug-in hybrid version of the GS4. The GS4 PHEV is powered by a 1.5 liter engine and the G-MCelectric system, working solely as a generator to charge the battery and power the electric motor. With the engine producing a maximum power of 71 kW（97 hp）and 120 N·m and the electric motor producing 177 hp（130 kW）and 300N·m, capable of a range of over 600 km and a pure electric range of 58 km. Fuel economy is 1.6 L/km.There is no transmission as such. The rotational torque of the electric motor is transmitted to the wheels through a gearbox with a constant gear ratio. The GS4 PHEV also features a rotating gear selector instead of the usual lever as in the gasoline version. The model range received a facelift in September 2018 for the 2019 model year. The GS4's PHEV model is also sold by Mitsubishi under the Eupheme brand as simply the "Eupheme PHEV". Another variant is rebadged and sold as the GAC Honda Shirui PHEV by the GAC Honda joint venture.

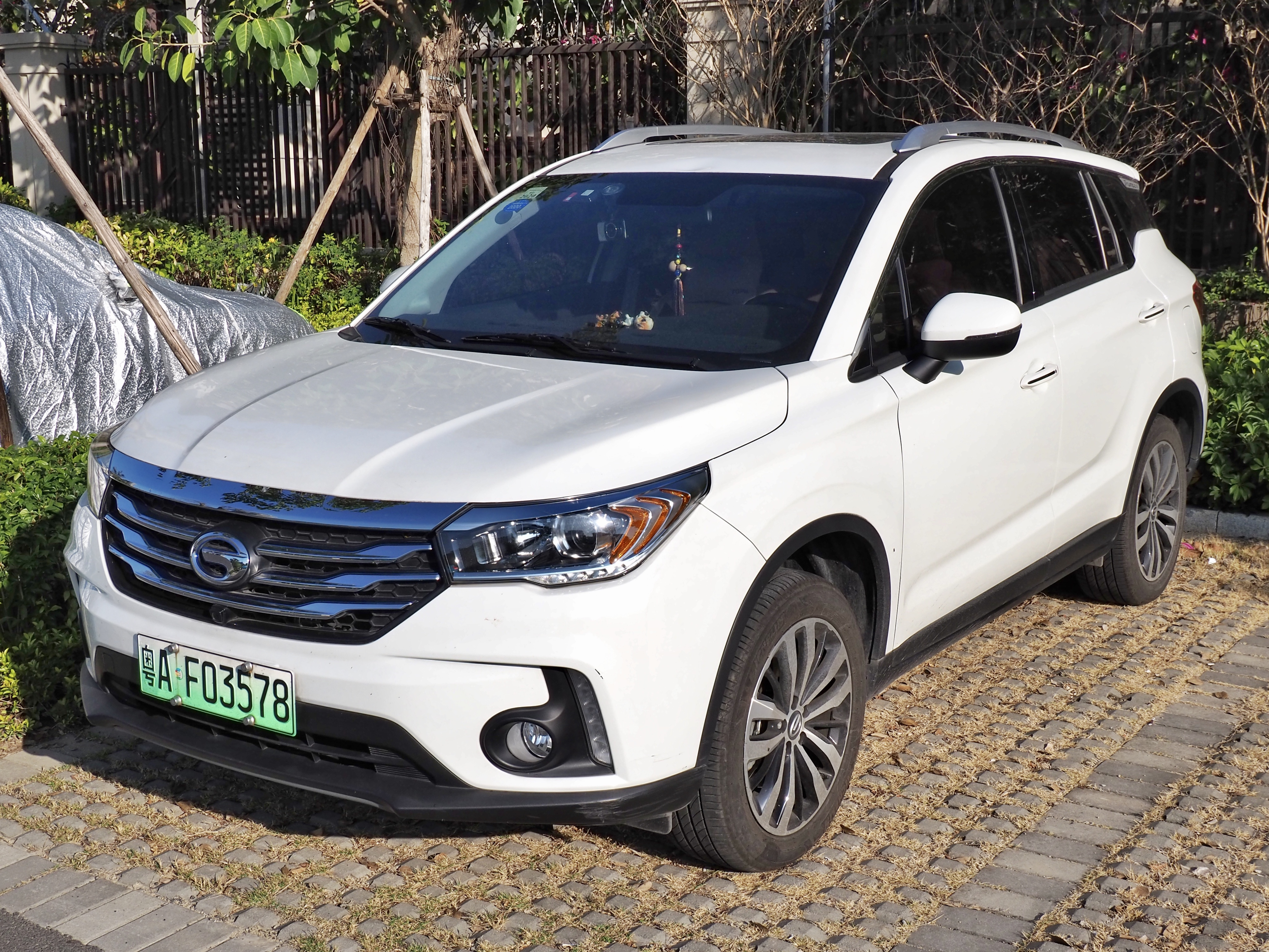
Trumpchi GS4 PHEV

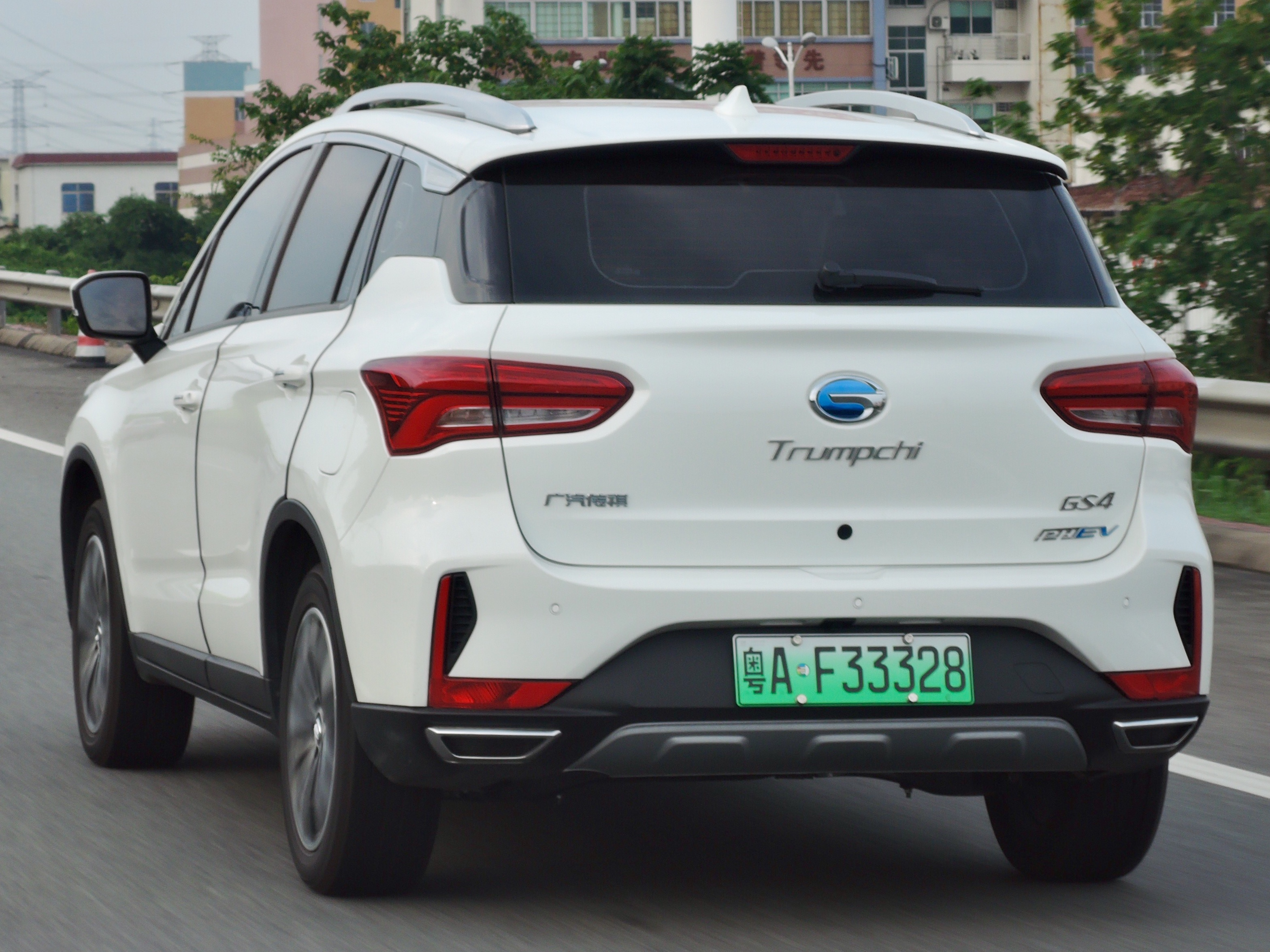
Trumpchi GS4 PHEV

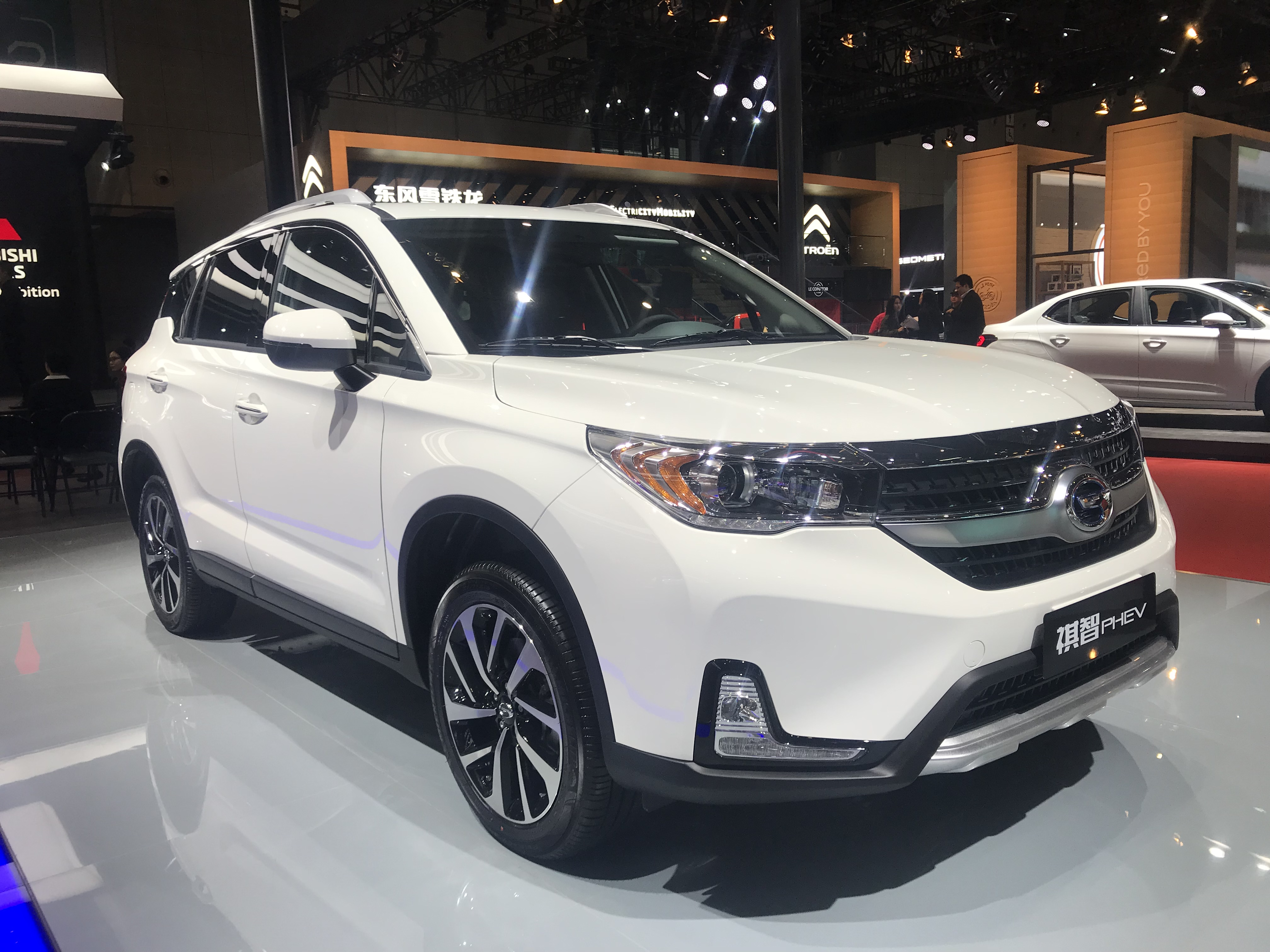
GAC-Mitsubishi Eupheme PHEV

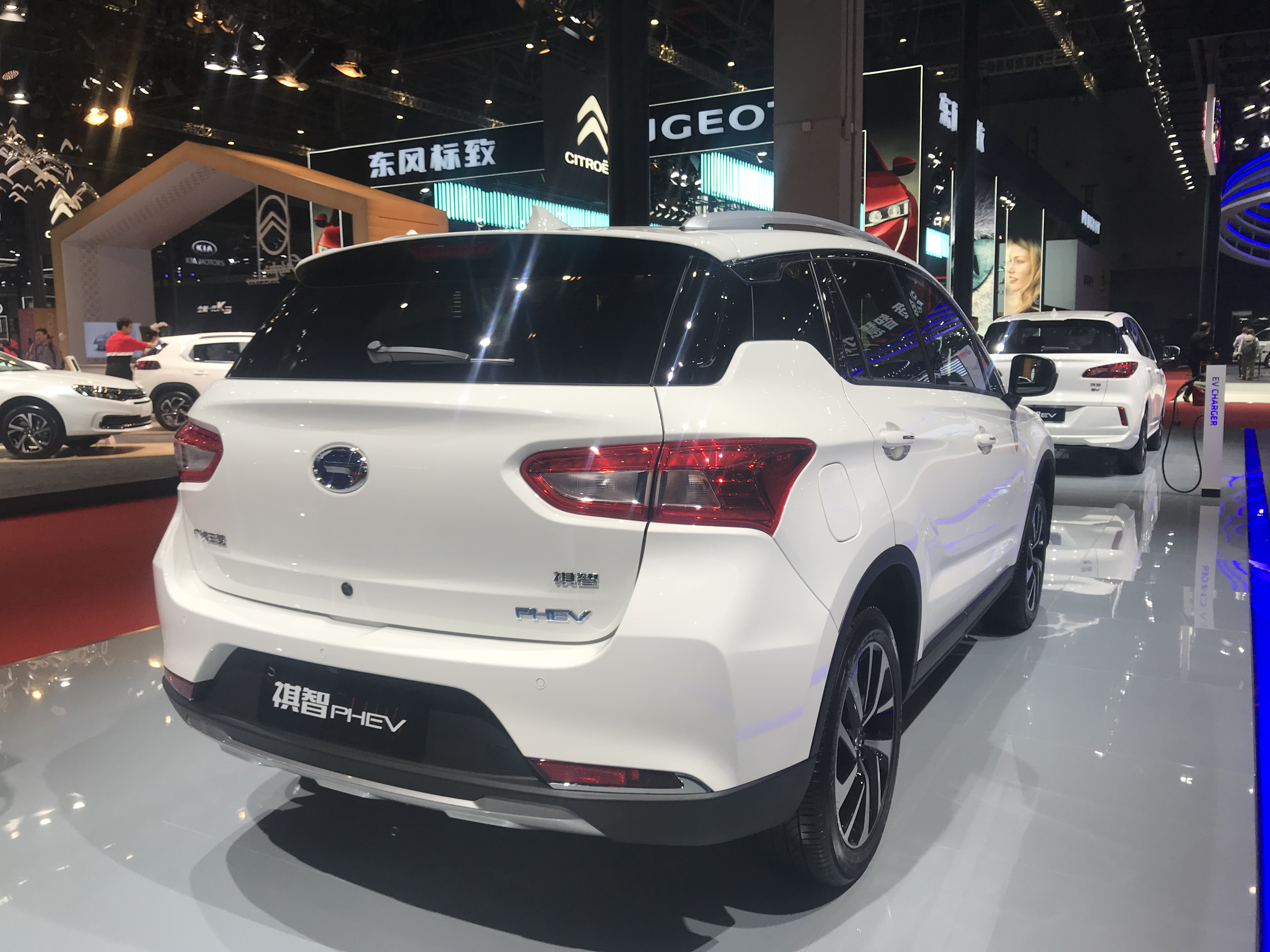
GAC-Mitsubishi Eupheme PHEV

=== Facelift ===
GAC launched the GS4 facelift version in June 2018, codename A32, compared to the pre-facelift version, the facelift version sports restyled bumpers, a set of redesigned rims in the same style as the GS3, and a new dashboard. Two months later, GAC launched the "Millionth Edition", the Millionth Edition GS4 features a panoramic sunroof and LED headlights.

In July 2019, the updated GS4 fitting the new Chinese emission standard was launched, the updated version only uses a new turbocharged direct injection engine called 4A15J1 (169 hp, 265Nm) mated to a 6 speed manual gearbox or 6 speed automatic gearbox (Aisin AWF6F25).

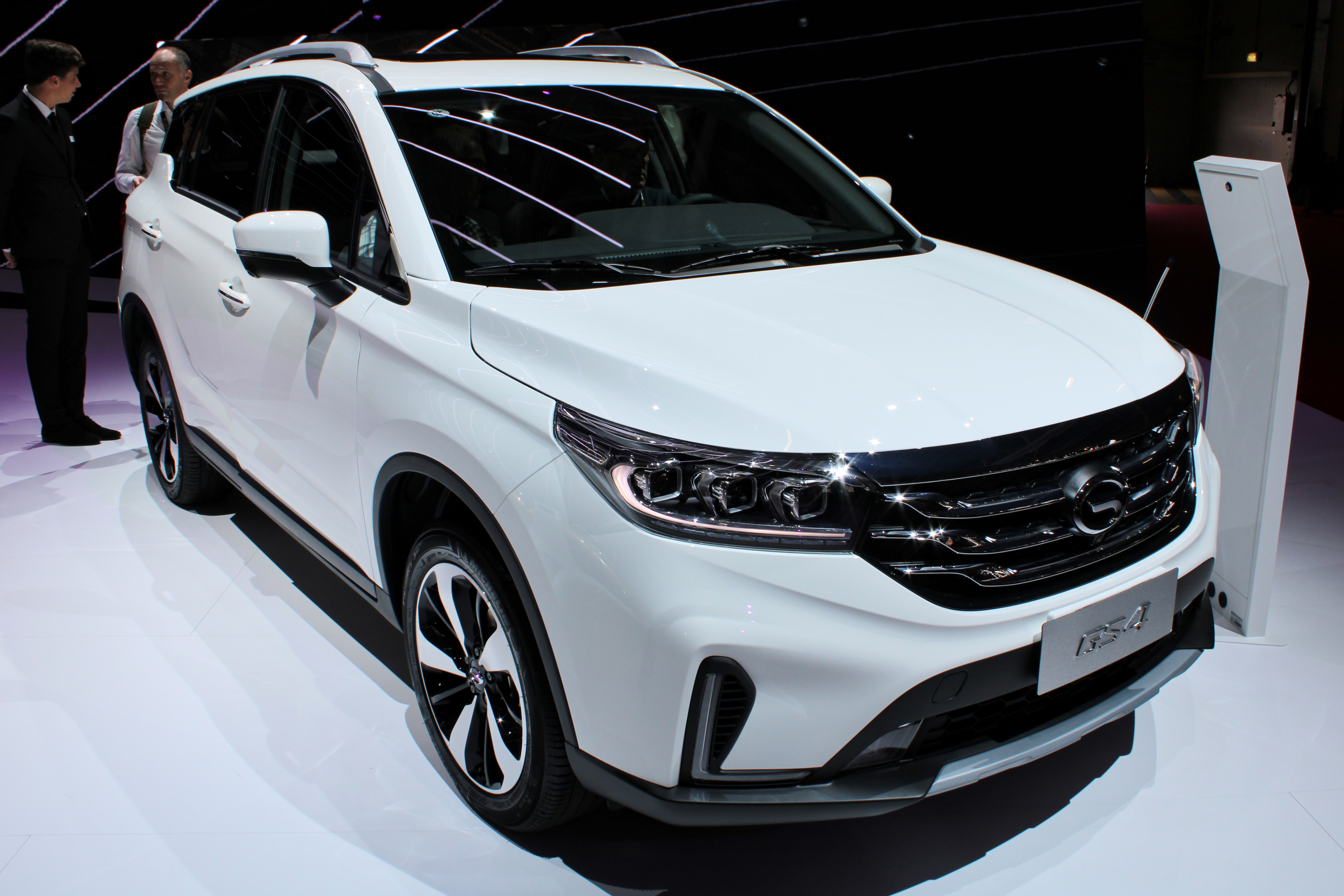
Trumpchi GS4 Facelift front

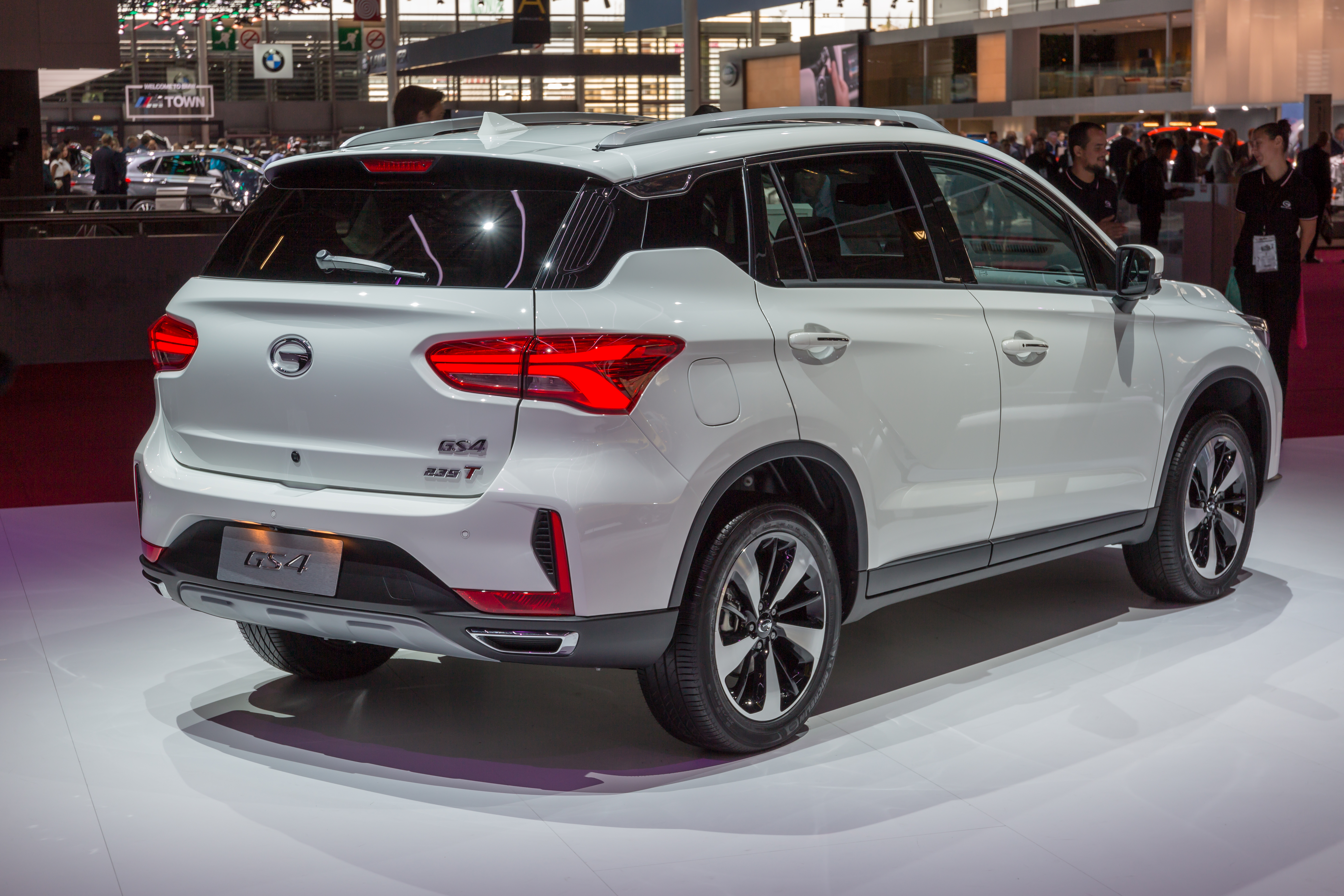
Trumpchi GS4 Facelift rear

== Second generation (A39) (2019) ==
Trumpchi GS4 II (A39)
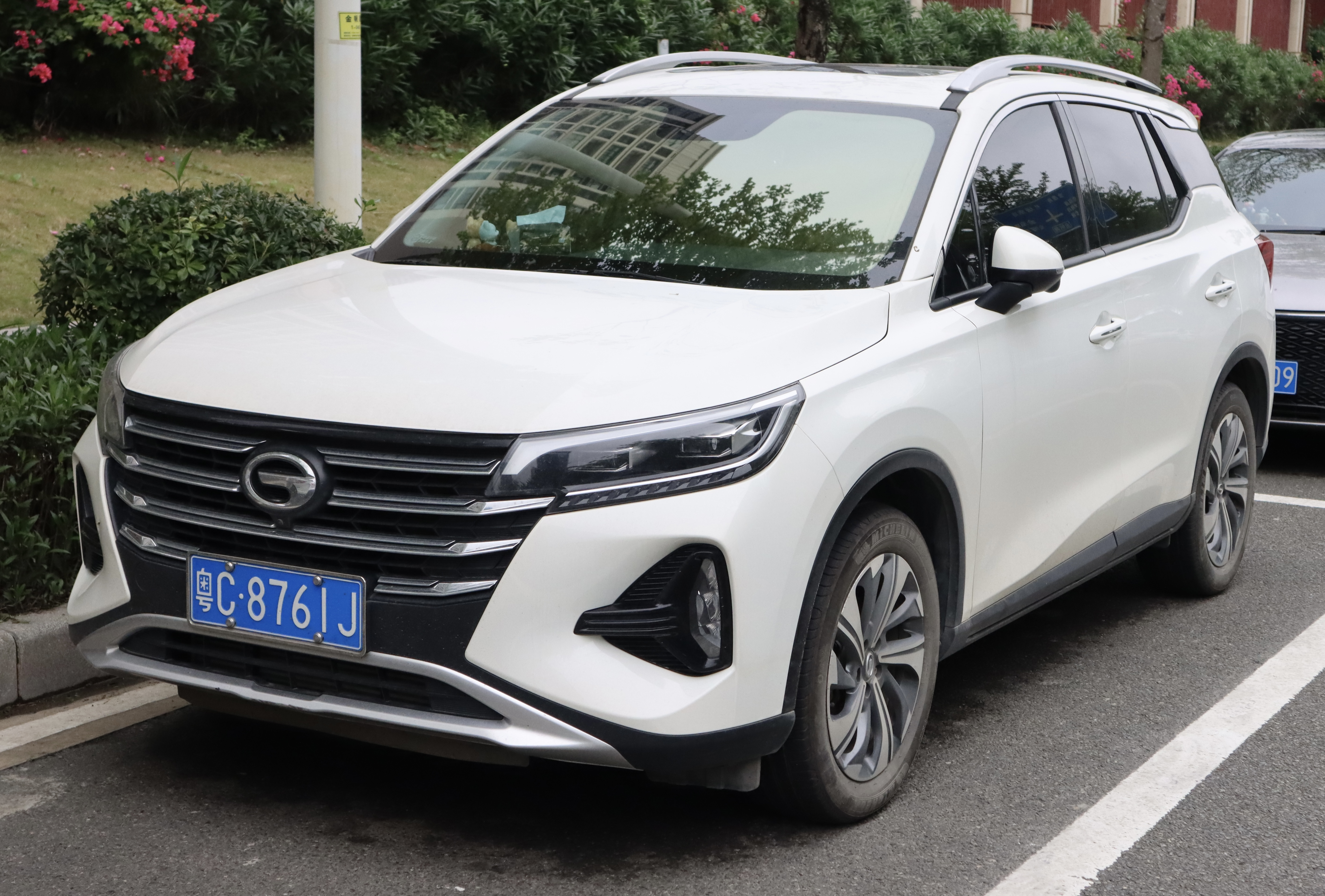
- Second generation Trumpchi GS4

Overview
- Also called: GAC GS4; Trumpchi GS4 EV; Trumpchi GS4 PHEV
- Production: 2019–2025; 2019–2023 (GS4 Coupe)
- Model years: 2019–2025
- Designer: Mario Chen

Body and chassis
- Platform: GPMA platform

Powertrain
- Engine: 1.3 L 4A13M1 turbo GDI I4 (gasoline: 200T); 1.5 L 4A15A1/J1 turbo GDI I4 (gasoline: 200/235/270T); 1.5 L 3B15J1 turbo GDI I3 (gasoline, 235T GS4 PHEV); 2.0 L 4B20J1 turbo GDI I4 (gasoline: 390T GS4 Plus)
- Electric motor: 177 PS (130 kW; 175 hp) permanent magnet motor/generator, torque 300 N.m (235T GS4 PHEV)
- Power output: 137 PS (101 kW; 135 hp) (3B15J1); 152 PS (112 kW; 150 hp) (4A15A1); 169 PS (124 kW; 167 hp) (4A15J1); 343 PS (252 kW; 338 hp) (3B15J1); 252 PS (185 kW; 249 hp) (4B20J1)
- Transmission: 6-speed manual; 6-speed automatic; 7-speed 7WDCT DCT; 7-speed G-DCT
- Hybrid drivetrain: PHEV (GS4 PHEV)
- Battery: 13kWh Ternary lithium battery

Dimensions
- Wheelbase: 2,680 mm (105.5 in)
- Length: 4,545 mm (178.9 in)
- Width: 1,856 mm (73.1 in)
- Height: 1,668–1,700 mm (65.7–66.9 in)
- Curb weight: 1,500–1,540 kg (3,307–3,395 lb)

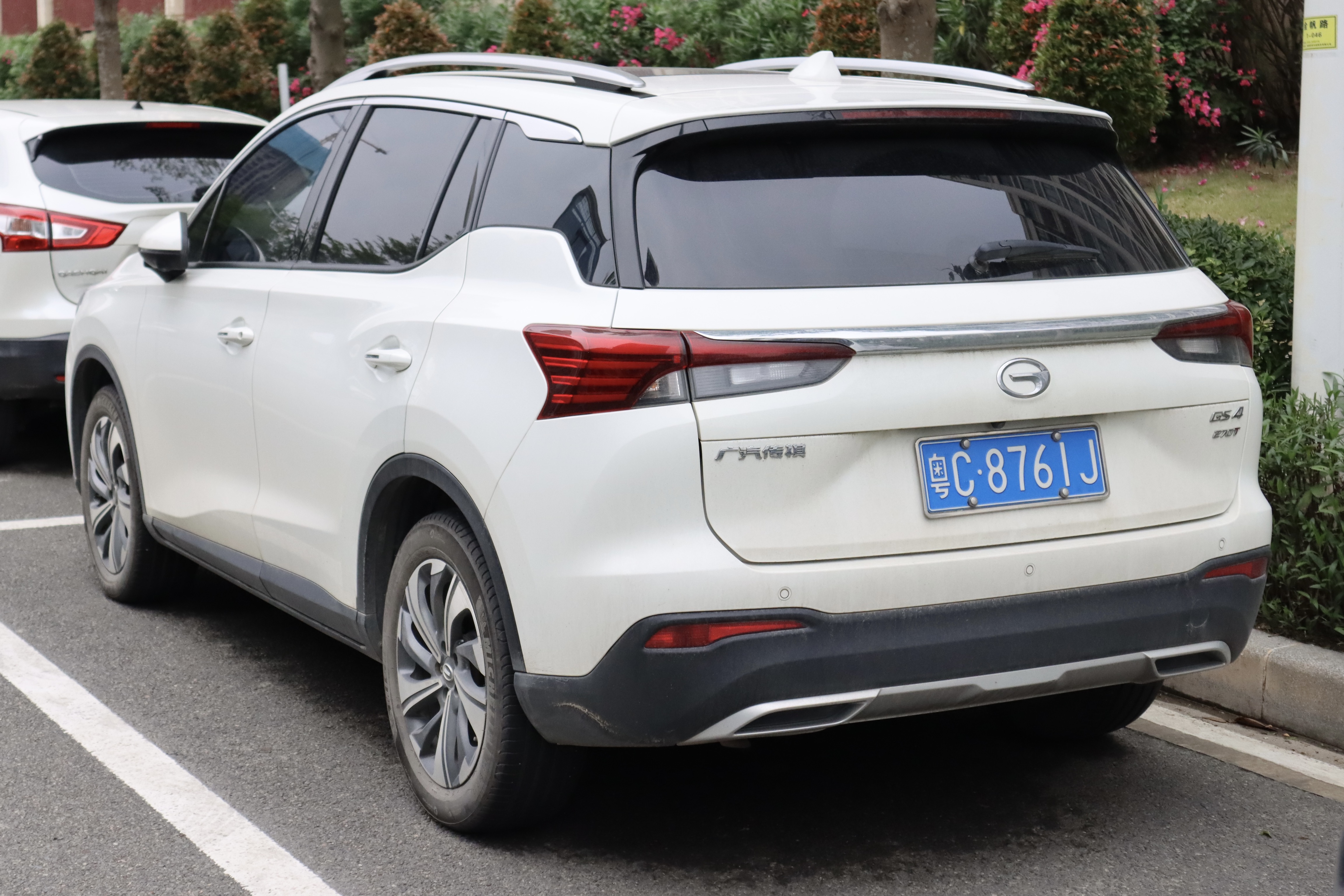
Trumpchi GS4 II rear

The second generation Trumpchi GS4 debuted in September 2019. The production model was available to the Chinese market in November 2019, with the power coming from a 1.5 liter turbo engine producing 169 hp and 265N·m. The transmission is a third generation 6-speed automatic transmission supplied by Aisin.

=== Trumpchi GS4 II PHEV ===
The plug-in hybrid version of the second generation GS4, the GS4 II PHEV was launched in April 2020. It is powered by a 1.5T liter turbo engine producing 150 hp and 220N·m with the electric motor adding an additional 177 hp. The battery capacity is 13kWh and is supplier by CATL. The pure electric range is 61 km rated by NEDC.

=== Trumpchi GS4 Coupe ===
A fastback version of the second generation GS4 model was launched. It uses the same engine as the regular GS4, but the transmission is replaced by a 7-speed dual-clutch transmission.

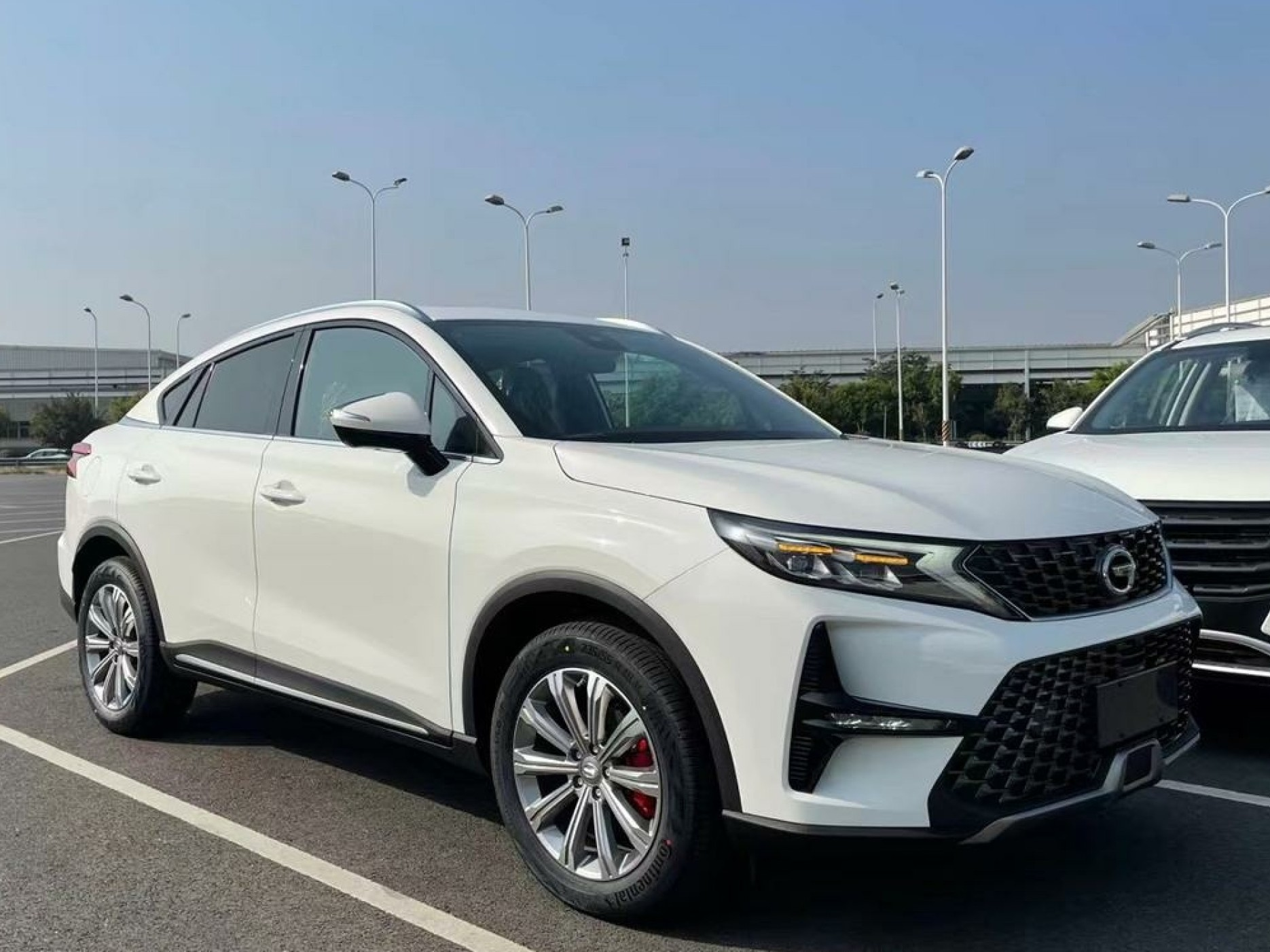
2020 Trumpchi GS4 Coupe

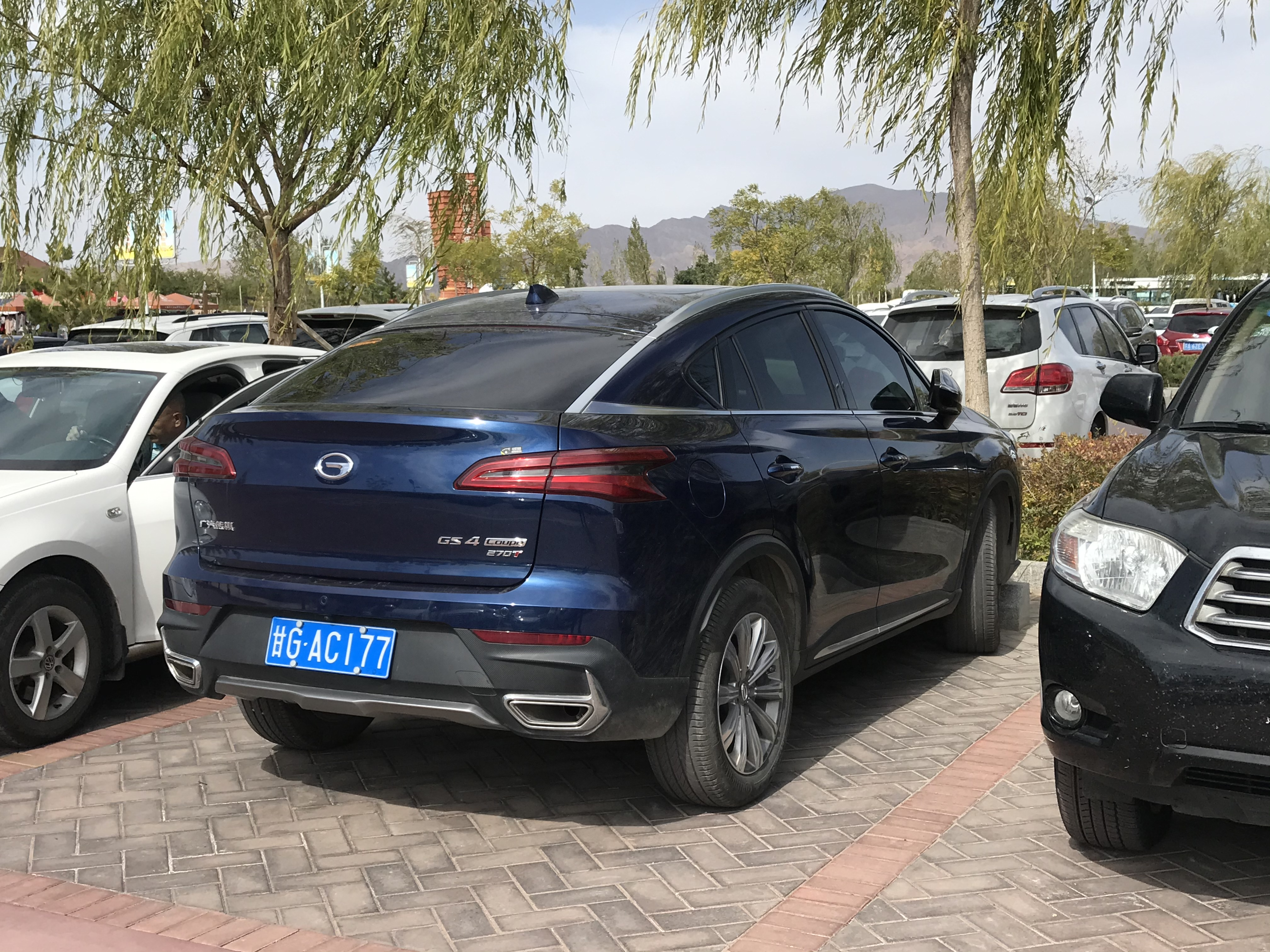
2020 Trumpchi GS4 Coupe rear

== Third generation (GS4 Plus) (2021) ==
Trumpchi GS4 Plus
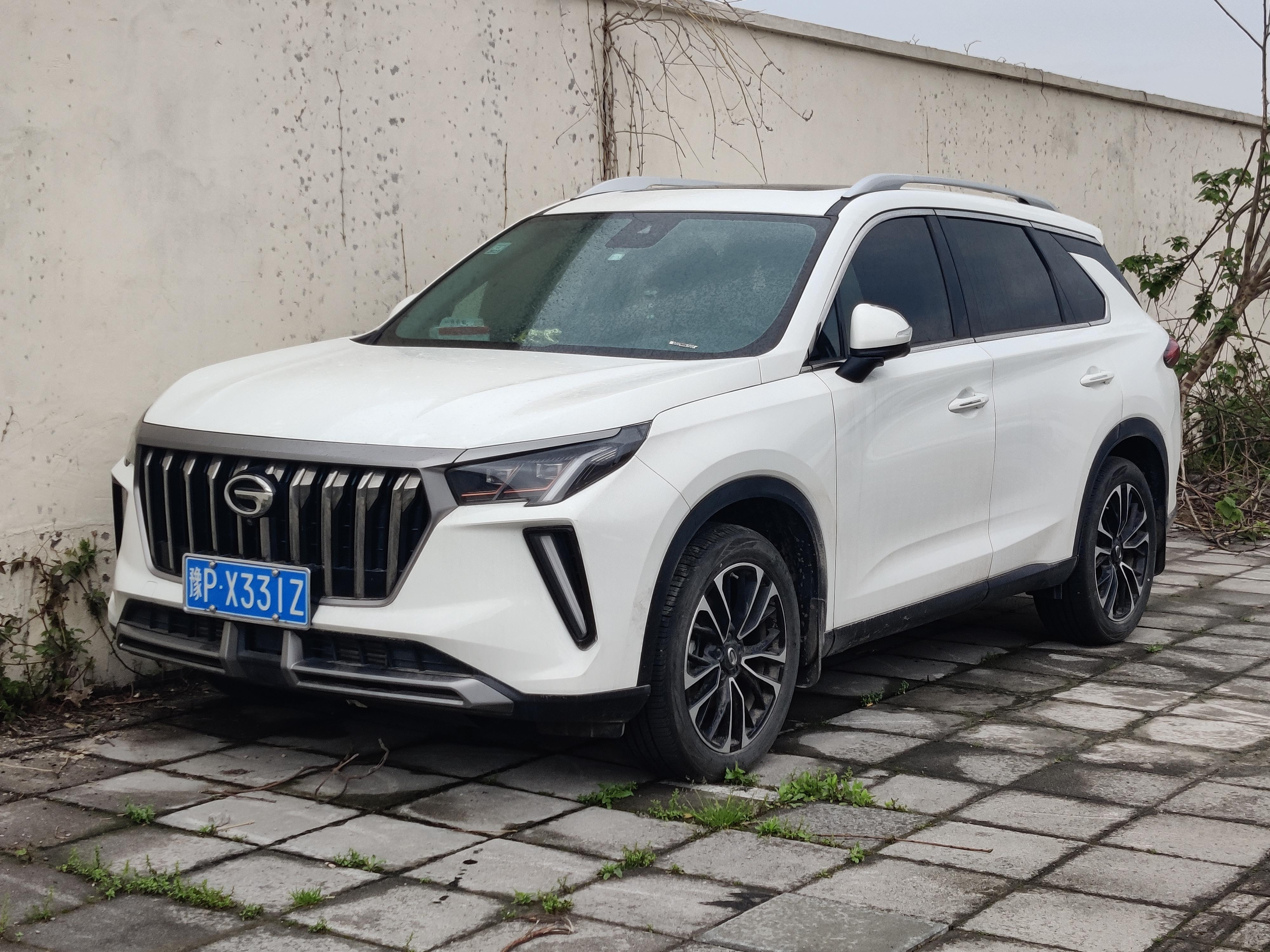

Overview
- Production: 2021–2025
- Model years: 2021–2025

Body and chassis
- Related: Trumpchi GS5

Powertrain
- Engine: Gasoline: 2.0 L 4B20J1 turbo I4
- Transmission: 6-speed Aisin automatic

Dimensions
- Wheelbase: 2,710 mm (106.7 in)2,710 mm (106.7 in)
- Length: 4,710 mm (185.4 in)
- Width: 1,885 mm (74.2 in)
- Height: 1,726 mm (68.0 in)
- Curb weight: 1,639 kg (3,613 lb)

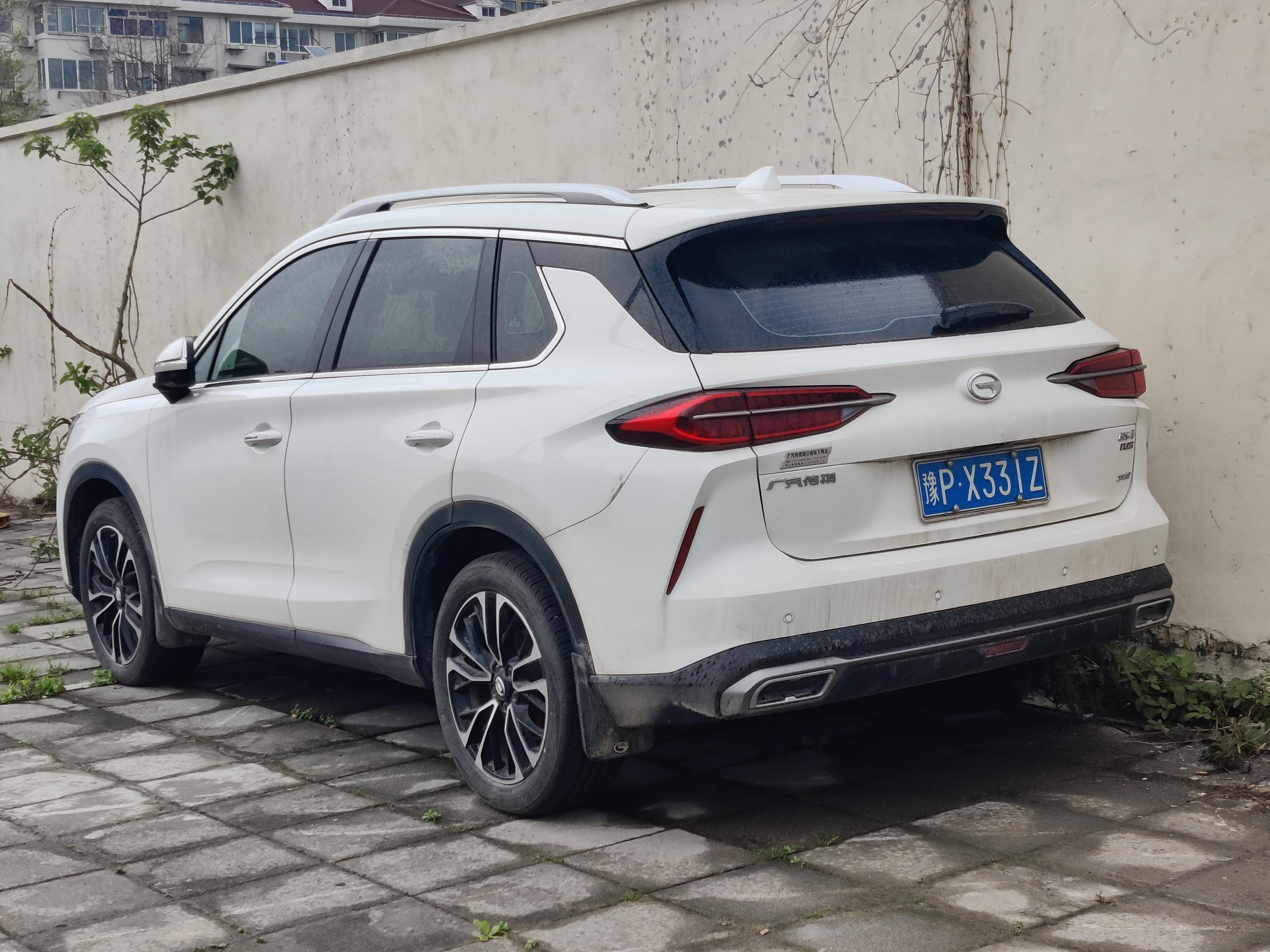
Trumpchi GS4 Plus rear

The third generation GS4 launched for the 2021 model year is a facelift of the second generation GS5, and it was launched during the 2021 Shanghai Auto Show, dubbed Trumpchi GS4 Plus. The Trumpchi GS4 Plus features completely redesigned front and rear ends and restyled 19-inch alloys, while the interior still heavily resembles the interior of the second generation GS5.

The infotainment system of the GS4 Plus is CarLife by Baidu, with CarPlay and voice command as optional features for higher trim models.

=== Powertrain ===
The Trumpchi GS4 Plus is powered by a 2.0-liter turbo engine codenamed 4B20J1 developing a maximum 185 kW (248 hp; 252 PS) and 390 N⋅m (288 lb⋅ft; 40 kg⋅m) mated to a 6-speed automatic transmission.

Specs
Model	Years	Transmission	Power@rpm	Torque@rpm	0–100 km/h (0–62 mph) (Official)	Top speed
2.0 L Turbo	2021–2025	6-speed automatic	185 kW (252 PS; 248 hp) at 5,250 rpm	390 N⋅m (288 lb⋅ft; 40 kg⋅m) at 1,750–4,000 rpm	7.5s	200 km/h (124 mph)

== Fourth generation (GS4 Max) (2024) ==
Trumpchi GS4 IV
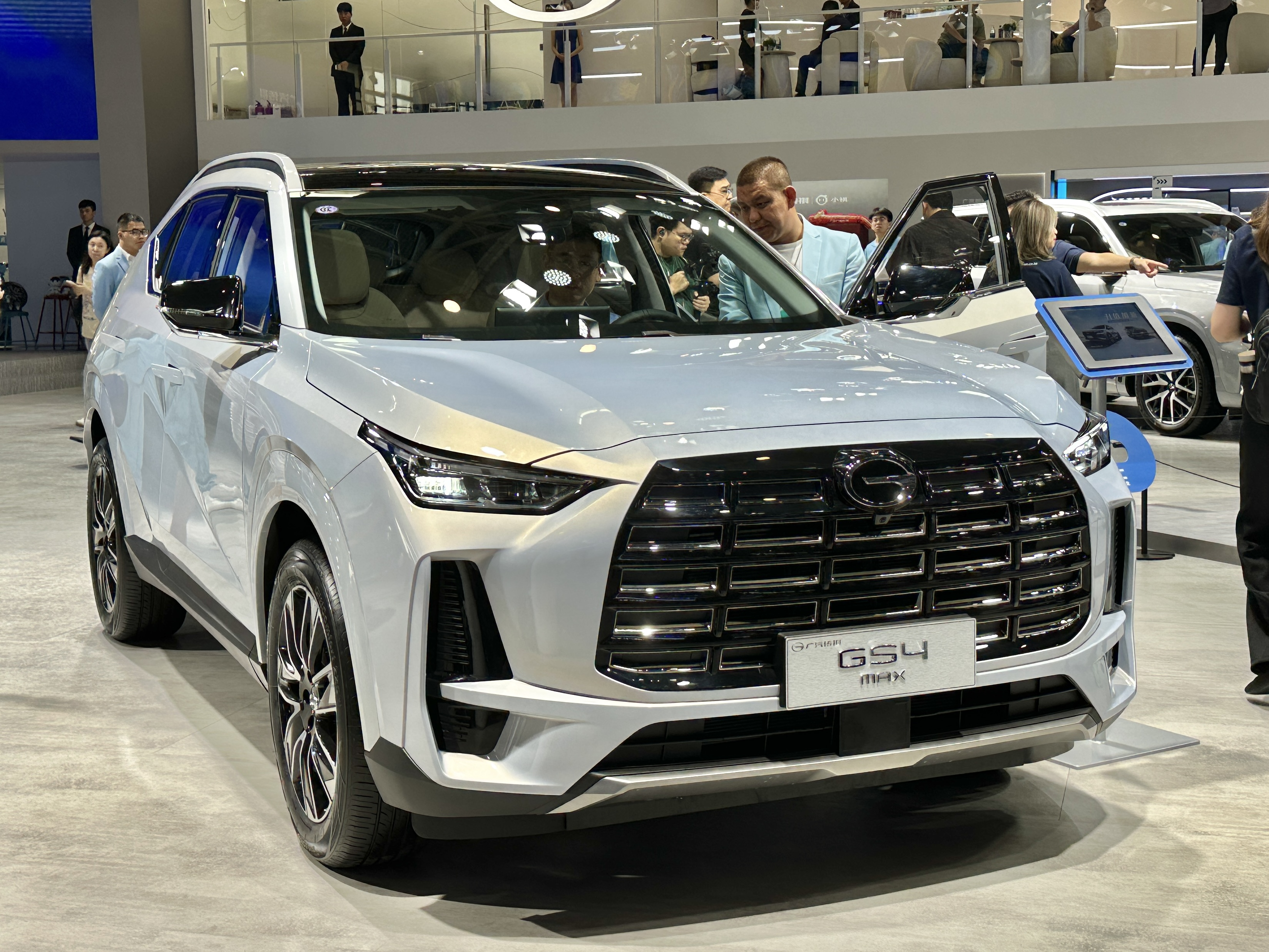
- Trumpchi GS4 Max at Auto Beijing

Overview
- Also called: GAC GS4 Max
- Production: 2024–present
- Model years: 2024–present

Body and chassis
- Platform: GAC Global Platform Modular Architecture (GMPA)
- Related: Trumpchi Emkoo

Powertrain
- Engine: 1.5 L 4A15J2 turbo I4

Dimensions
- Wheelbase: 2,750 mm (108.3 in)
- Length: 4,685 mm (184.4 in)
- Width: 1,901 mm (74.8 in)
- Height: 1,690 mm (66.5 in)
- Curb weight: 1,540 kg (3,395 lb)

In March 2024, Trumpchi announced the fourth generation of GS4 which marketed as GS4 Max, a redesigned variant of Trumpchi Emkoo.

The GS4 Max equipped with 1.5 litre turbocharged engine, mated with a 7-speed dual clutch transmission which produces 130 kW (177 PS; 174 hp) and maximum torque of 270 N⋅m (199 lb⋅ft; 28 kg⋅m). Trumpchi claimed it has the fuel consumption of 6.8L/100 km under WLTC with 800 km (497 mi) of range. The GS4 Max will integrate the GS4 product line and replace the second generation of GS4 and GS4 Plus.

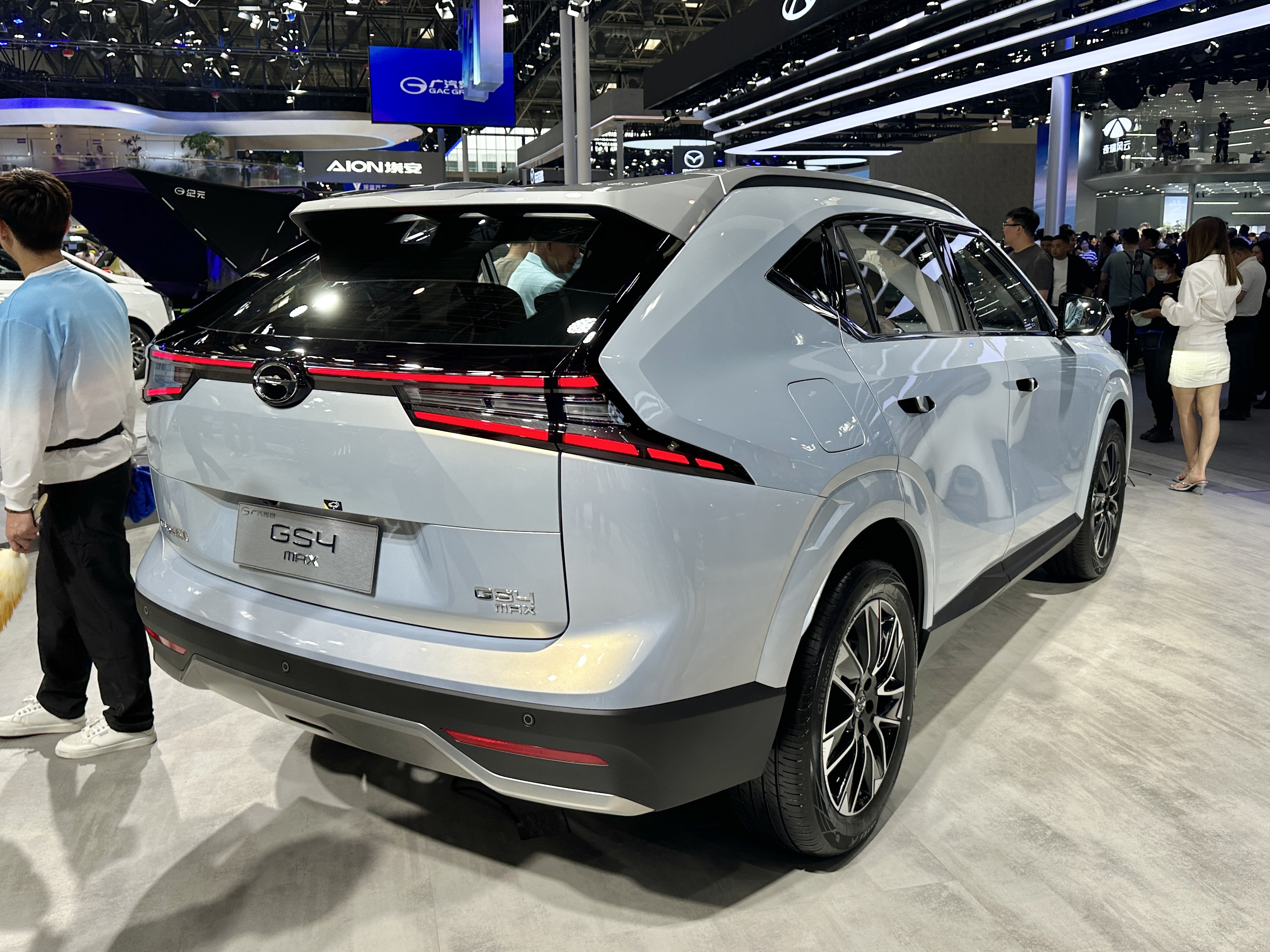
Trumpchi GS4 Max rear

=== Powertrain ===
Specs
Model	Years	Transmission	Power@rpm	Torque@rpm	0–100 km/h (0–62 mph) (Official)	Top speed
1.5 L Turbo	2024–present	7-speed DCT	130 kW (177 PS; 174 hp) at 5,500 rpm	270 N⋅m (199 lb⋅ft; 28 kg⋅m) at 1,400–4,500 rpm	8.8s	190 km/h (118 mph)

== Fifth generation (2026) ==
Trumpchi GS4 V
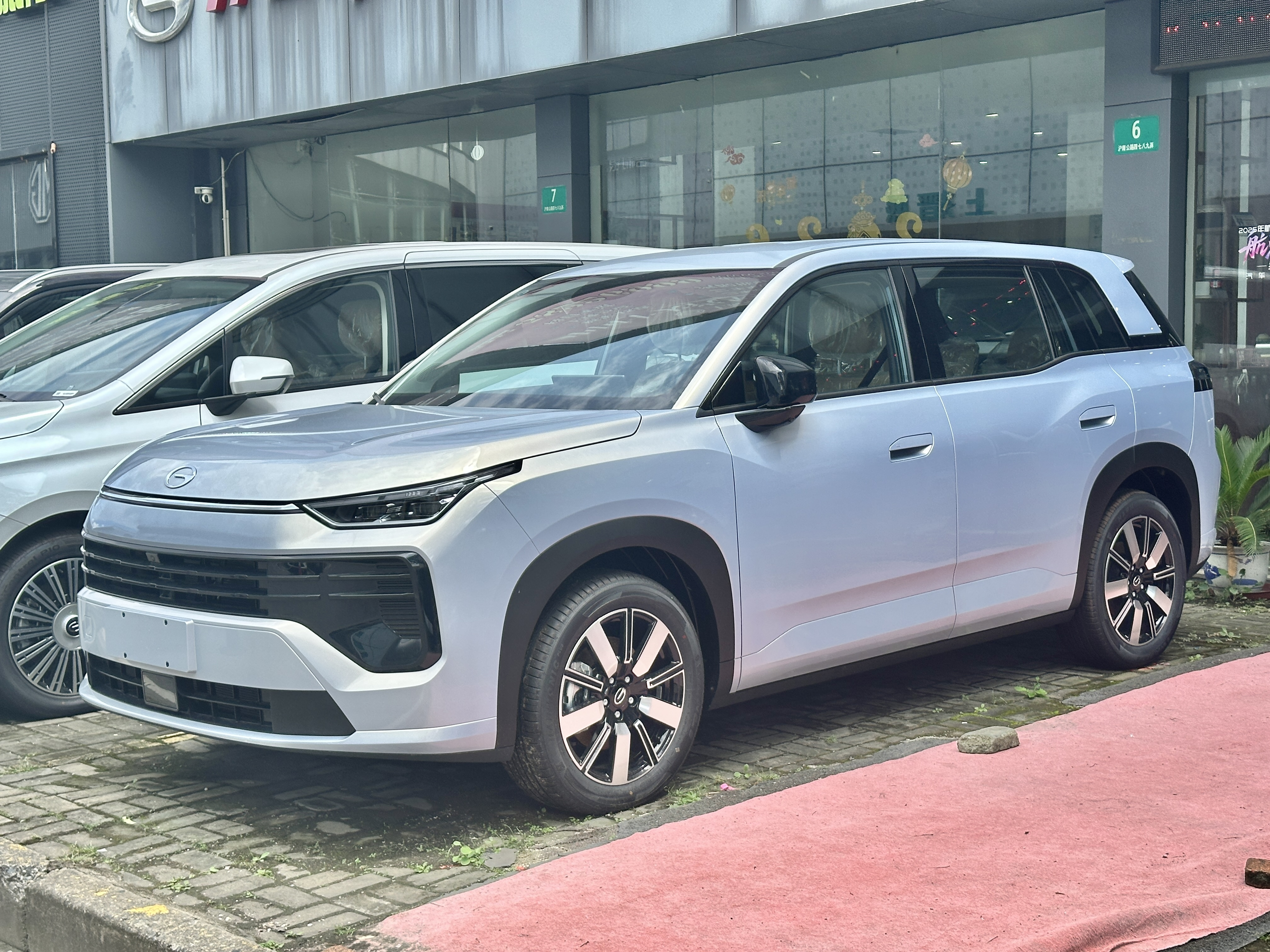
- Fifth generation Trumpchi GS4

Overview
- Production: 2026–present
- Model years: 2026–present

Body and chassis
- Related: Aion i60

Powertrain
- Engine: 1.5 L 4A15J2 turbo I4

Dimensions
- Wheelbase: 2,770 mm (109.1 in)
- Length: 4,680 mm (184.3 in)
- Width: 1,860 mm (73.2 in)
- Height: 1,675 mm (65.9 in)

The fifth generation Trumpchi GS4 debuted in June 2026, it is essentially a rebadged Aion i60 with restyled front bumpers to integrate more air intake for the petrol engine. In terms of dimensions. the fourth generation Trumpchi GS4 measures 4,680 mm (184.3 in) in length, 1,860 mm (73.2 in) in width, and 1,675 mm (65.9 in) in height. When equipped without roof trim strips, the vehicle height is reduced to 1,660 mm (65.4 in). The wheelbase is 2,770 mm (109.1 in), with front and rear track widths of 1,600 mm (63.0 in) and 1,606 mm (63.2 in) respectively. Front and rear overhangs measure 967 mm (38.1 in) and 943 mm (37.1 in), while the approach and departure angles are 16° and 22°. The fourth generation GS4 adopts a standard five-seat layout and offers two curb weight versions: 1,520 kg (3,351 lb) and 1,550 kg (3,417 lb). The gross vehicle weight is 1,965 kg (4,332 lb). Tire options include 215/60 R17 and 215/55 R18 specifications, and the body uses unibody construction. In terms of powertrain, the fourth generation GS4 is powered by a 1.5-liter turbocharged engine manufactured by Guangzhou Qisheng Powertrain Co., Ltd. The engine has a displacement of 1,497 mL (1.497 L; 91.4 cu in), producing a maximum output of 174 hp (130 kW; 176 PS) and a maximum net power output of 168 hp (125 kW; 170 PS). The top speed is rated at 185 km/h (115 mph).

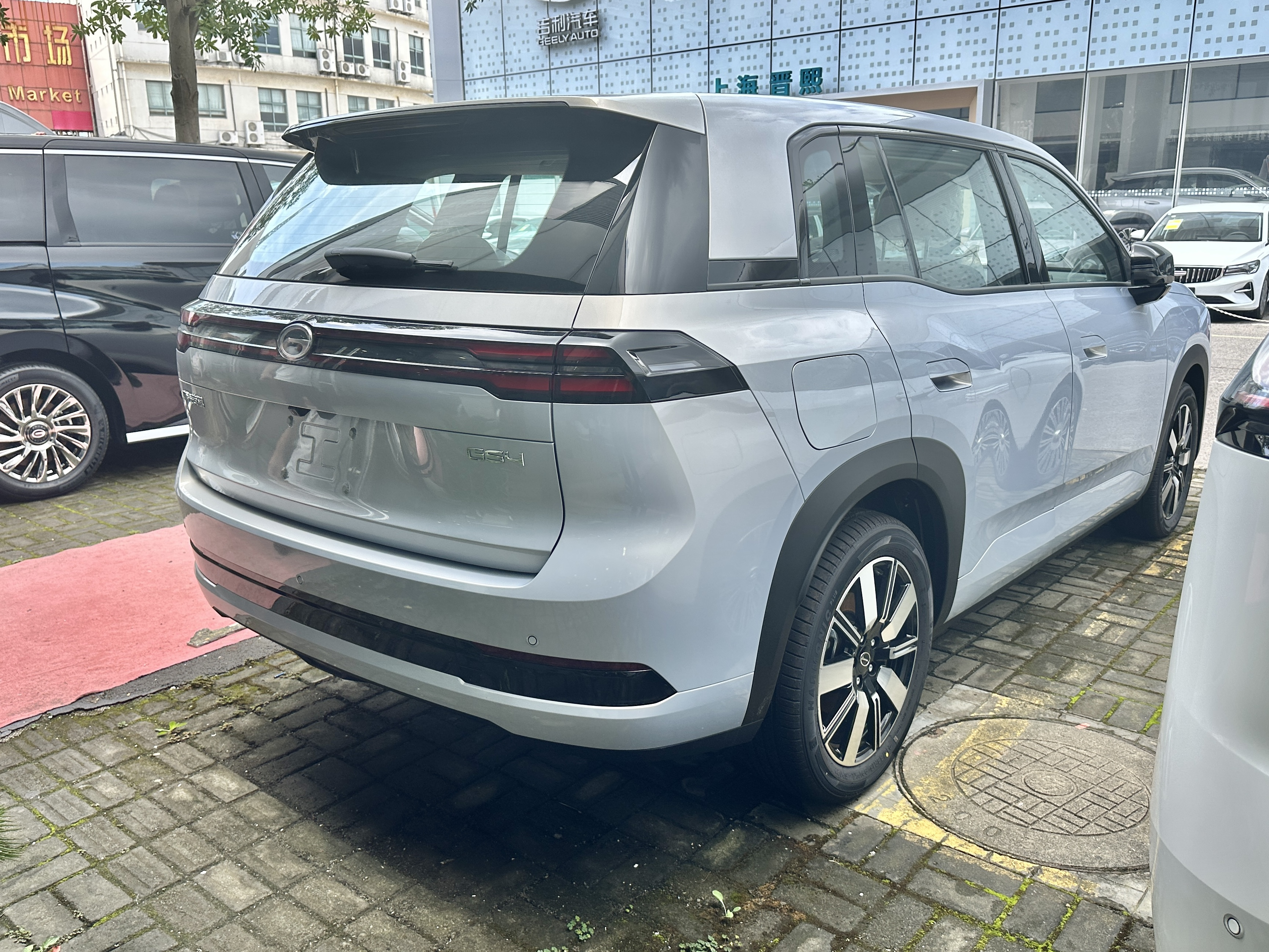
Rear

== Sales ==
Year	China		
Year	GS4	GS4 Plus	PHEV
2023	22,281	9,775	210
2024	23,099	2,193	10
2025	16,781	—	3

== See also ==
- List of GAC vehicles
