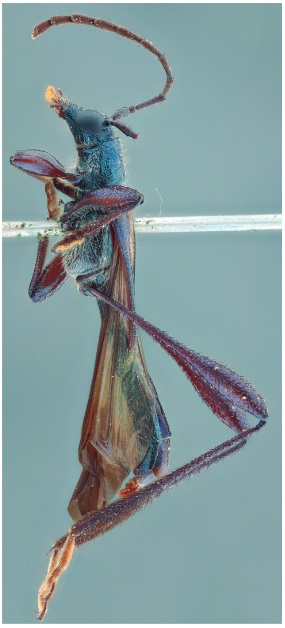

Scientific classification
- Kingdom: Animalia
- Phylum: Arthropoda
- Clade: Pancrustacea
- Class: Insecta
- Order: Coleoptera
- Suborder: Polyphaga
- Infraorder: Cucujiformia
- Family: Cerambycidae
- Genus: Paraphygopoda
- Species: P. viridimicans

Binomial name
- Paraphygopoda viridimicans Fisher, 1952

Synonyms
- Epimelitta viridimicans Fisher, 1952; Pseudophygopoda viridimicans

= Paraphygopoda viridimicans =

Species of beetle

Paraphygopoda viridimicans is a species of beetle in the family Cerambycidae. It was described by Fisher in 1952. It is found in Brazil.
