= List of GAC Group vehicles =

This is a list of current and former automobiles produced by Chinese automaker Guangzhou Automobile Corporation (abbreviated as GAC), under its brands of Hyptec, Trumpchi and Aion. The brands formerly used by the company include Gonow.

For vehicles produced with joint venture partners Fiat Chrysler Automobiles, Honda, Mitsubishi Motors, Nio, and Toyota, see List of GAC vehicles with joint venture.

== Current vehicles ==
=== Trumpchi ===
| Image | Name | Chinese name | Introduction | Generation | Vehicle description |
Sedan
| | Empow | 传祺影豹 | 2021 | 1st | Compact sedan, ICE/PHEV |
SUV
| | GS3 | 传祺GS3影速 | 2017 | 2nd | Subcompact SUV |
| | GS4 | 传祺GS4 | 2015 | 5th | Compact SUV, ICE variant of Aion i60 |
| | GS8 ES9 | 传祺GS8 传祺新能源ES9 | 2016 2023 | 2nd | Mid-size SUV PHEV variant |
| | Xiangwang S7 | 传祺向往S7 | 2025 | 1st | Mid-size SUV, PHEV |
| | Xiangwang S9 | 传祺向往S9 | 2025 | 1st | Full-size SUV, PHEV |
| | Yue 7 | 传祺越7 | 2026 | 1st | Full-size off-road SUV, PHEV |
MPV/Minivan
| | M6 | 传祺M6 | 2019 | 1st | Compact MPV, former GM6, renamed in 2020. |
| | E8 Xiangwang E8 | 传祺新能源E8 传祺向往E8 | 2023 2026 | 1st 1st | Mid-size MPV, PHEV Upgraded variant |
| | M8 E9 | 传祺M8/向往M8 传祺新能源E9 | 2018 2023 | 2nd | Full-size MPV former GM8, renamed in 2020. PHEV variant of M8 II |

=== Aistaland ===
| Image | Name | Chinese name | Introduction | Generation | Vehicle description |
Cars
| | GT7 | 启境GT7 | 2026 | 1st | Full-size shooting brake, BEV/EREV |
SUV
| | GX7 | 启境GX7 | 2026 | 1st | Mid-size SUV, BEV/EREV |

=== Aion ===
| Image | Name | Chinese name | Introduction | Generation | Vehicle description |
Cars
| | UT | 埃安UT | 2024 | 1st | Compact hatchback, BEV |
| | S S Plus | 埃安S 埃安S PLUS | 2019 2021 | 1st | Compact sedan, BEV, also sold as Leahead iA5. facelifted and enlarged variant of Aion S |
| | RT | 埃安RT | 2024 | 1st | Mid-size sedan, BEV |
| | Ray 7 | 埃安Ray 7 | 2026 | 1st | Mid-size sedan, BEV |
SUVs
| | V i60 | 埃安V 埃安i60 | 2020 2025 | 2nd | Compact SUV, BEV BEV/PHEV(EREV) variant of Aion V |
| | Y N60 | 埃安Y 埃安N60 | 2021 2026 | 1st | Compact SUV, BEV BEV/PHEV(EREV) variant of Aion Y |

=== Hyptec ===
| Image | Name | Chinese name | Introduction | Generation | Vehicle description |
Sedans
| | GT | 昊铂GT | 2023 | 1st | Mid-size sedan, BEV |
| | A800 | 昊铂A800 | 2026 | 1st | Full-size sedan, PHEV(EREV) |
SUVs
| | HT S600 | 昊铂HT 昊铂S600 | 2023 2026 | 1st | Mid-size SUV, BEV BEV/PHEV(EREV) variant of HT |
| | HL | 昊铂HL | 2025 | 1st | Full-size SUV, BEV |
Sports car
| | SSR | 昊铂SSR | 2023 | 1st | Sports car, BEV |

== Discontinued vehicles ==
=== Trumpchi ===
| Image | Name | Chinese name | Introduction | Discontinuation | Final Generation | Vehicle description |
Sedan
| | GA3 | 传祺GA3 | 2013 | 2015 | 1st | Compact sedan, renamed from Gonow Emei in 2013 |
| | GA3S/ GA3 PHEV | 传祺GA3S/GA3 PHEV | 2014 | 2019 | 1st | Compact sedan, sportier/PHEV variant of the GA3 |
| | GA4 | 传祺GA4 | 2018 | 2022 | 1st | Compact sedan |
| | GA5/GA5 PHEV | 传祺GA5/GA5 PHEV | 2010 | 2018 | 1st | Compact sedan |
| | GA6 | 传祺GA6 | 2014 | 2023 | 2nd | Mid-size sedan |
| | GA8 | 传祺GA8 | 2015 | 2023 | 2nd | Full-size sedan |
SUV
| | Emkoo | 传祺影酷 | 2022 | 2025 | 1st | Compact SUV, the Emkoo is redesigned variant of third generation GS4 |
| | GE3 | 传祺GE4 | 2017 | 2020 | 1st | Subcompact SUV, Also rebadged as Mitsubishi E-More |
| | GS4 Coupe | 传祺GS4 COUPE | 2020 | 2023 | 1st | Compact coupe SUV, coupe variant of second generation GS4 |
| | GS5/GS4 Plus | 传祺GS5/GS4 PLUS | 2012 | 2025 | 2nd | Compact SUV, the second generation was renamed to GS4 Plus |
| | GS7/GS8S | 传祺GS7/GS8S | 2017 | 2021 | 1st | Mid-size SUV, shorter 5 seater variant of the GS8 |

=== Aion ===
| Image | Name | Chinese name | Introduction | Discontinuation | Generation | Vehicle description |
Cars
| | S Max | 埃安S MAX | 2023 | 2026 | 1st | Compact sedan, BEV, enlarged variant of Aion S Plus |
SUVs
| | LX | 埃安LX | 2019 | 2026 | 1st | Mid-size SUV, BEV |

=== Gonow ===
| Image | Name | Chinese name | Introduction | Discontinuation | Final Generation | Vehicle description |
Sedan
| | Emei | 吉奥E美 | 2013 | 2013 | 1st | Subcompact sedan, before being renamed in 2013. |
SUV
| | Saboo | 吉奥帅豹 | 2010 | 2015 | 1st | Mid-size SUV |
| | Aoosed GX5/G5 | 吉奥奥轩GX5/G5 | 2010 | 2014 | 1st | Mid-size SUV |
| | GX6 | 吉奥GX6 | 2014 | 2016 | 1st | Mid-size SUV |
| | Victory | 吉奥凯旋 | 2006 | 2009 | 1st | Mid-size SUV |
| | Jetstar | 吉奥凯睿 | 2003 | 2009 | 1st | Full-size SUV |
Minivan
| | Way | 吉奥星旺 | 2012 | 2016 | 1st | Mircrovan |
| | Starry | 吉奥星朗 | 2014 | 2016 | 1st | Compact MPV, Also called Xinglang. |
| | Lightweight | 吉奥? | 2004 | 2016 | 1st | Full-size van |
Pickup truck
| | Way | 吉奥星旺 | 2012 | 2016 | 1st | Mirco pickup truck |
| | Troy | 吉奥财运 | 2006 | 2016 | 1st | Mid-size Pickup |
| | GP150 | 吉奥GP150 | 2014 | 2016 | 1st | Mid-size Pickup |

== Concept ==
- GAC Pickup 01 - 2025
- GAC ENPULSE - 2020
- GAC ERA - 2023
- GAC TIME - 2021
- HYPTEC EARTH - 2025
- MONTX P10 - 2026
- MONTX V10 - 2026
- GAC Barchetta - 2022
