= Gonow Saboo =

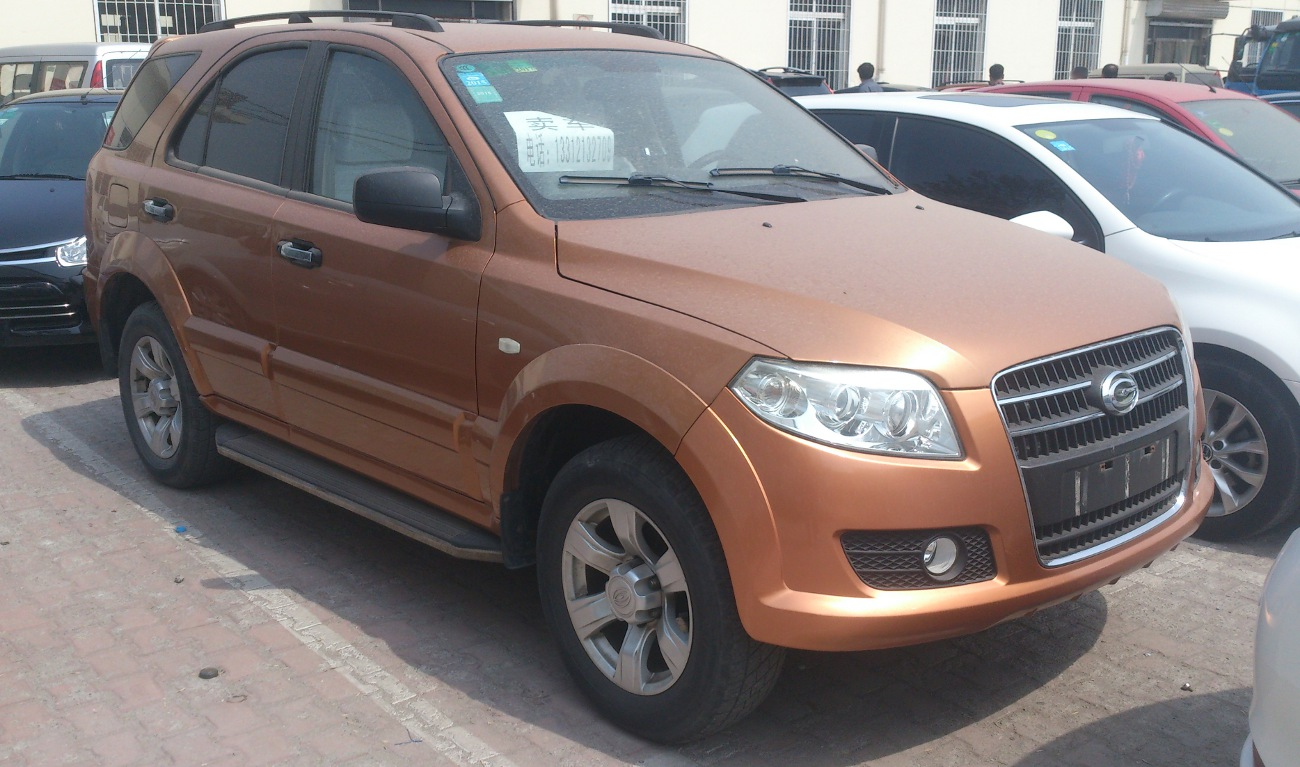

Overview
- Also called: Gonow Aoosed G3; Gonow GS1
- Production: 2010–2015

Body and chassis
- Layout: Front engine, four-wheel-drive
- Related: Huanghai Landscape F1

Powertrain
- Engine: Mitsubishi 4G64S4M 2.4L
- Transmission: MT (AT is at additional cost)

Dimensions
- Wheelbase: 2,700 mm (106.3 in)
- Length: 4,620 mm (181.9 in)
- Width: 1,885 mm (74.2 in)
- Height: 1,830 mm (72.0 in)

Chronology
- Successor: Gonow Aoosed G5 / Gonow Aoosed GX5 / Gonow GX6

The Gonow Saboo (Chinese: 帅豹) is a mid-size crossover SUV produced from 2010 to 2015 by the Chinese manufacturer Guangzhou Automobile under the Gonow brand.

== Overview ==
The MSRP is 119,800 yuan. The design of it is controversial as it is visually heavily inspired by the first generation Kia Sorento, with the side profiles being mostly the same.

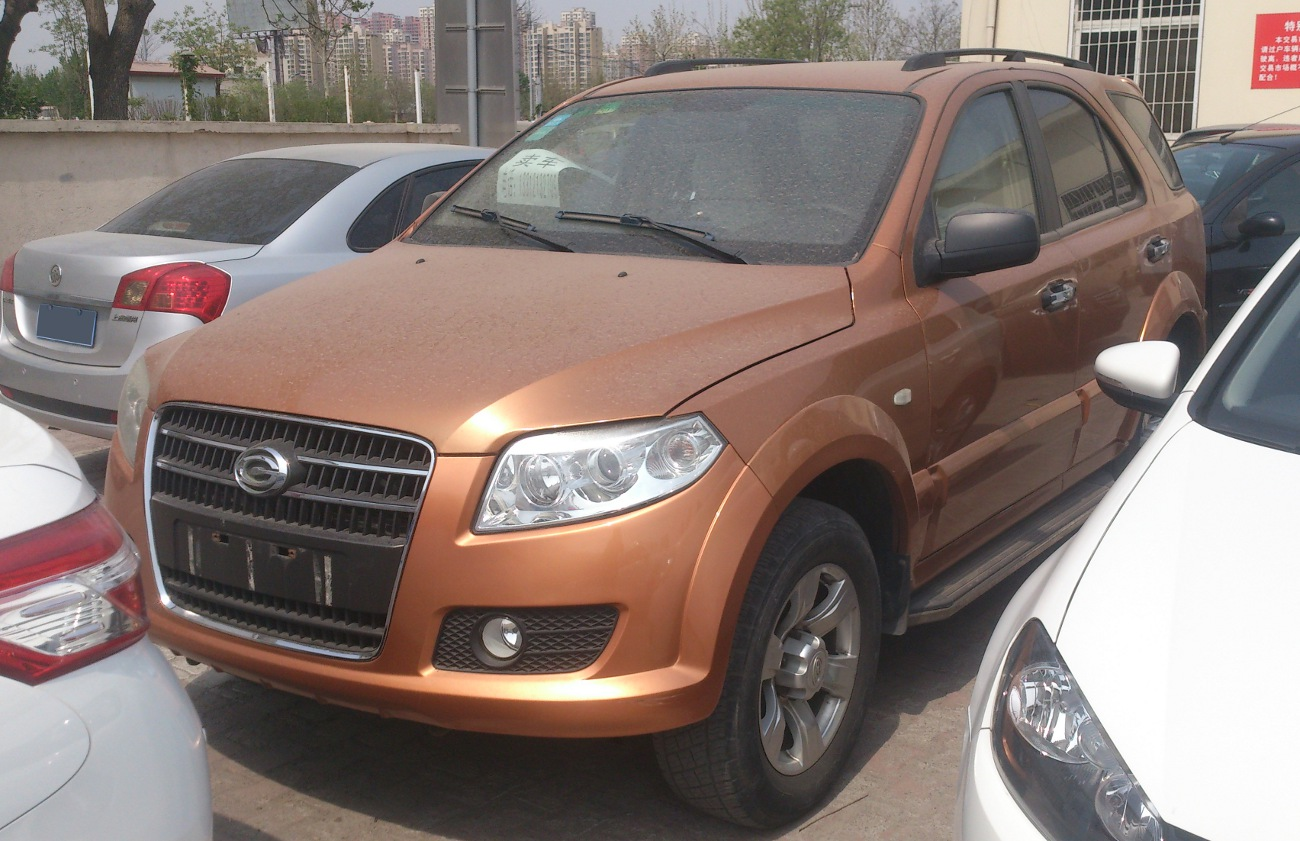
Gonow Aoosed G3 front

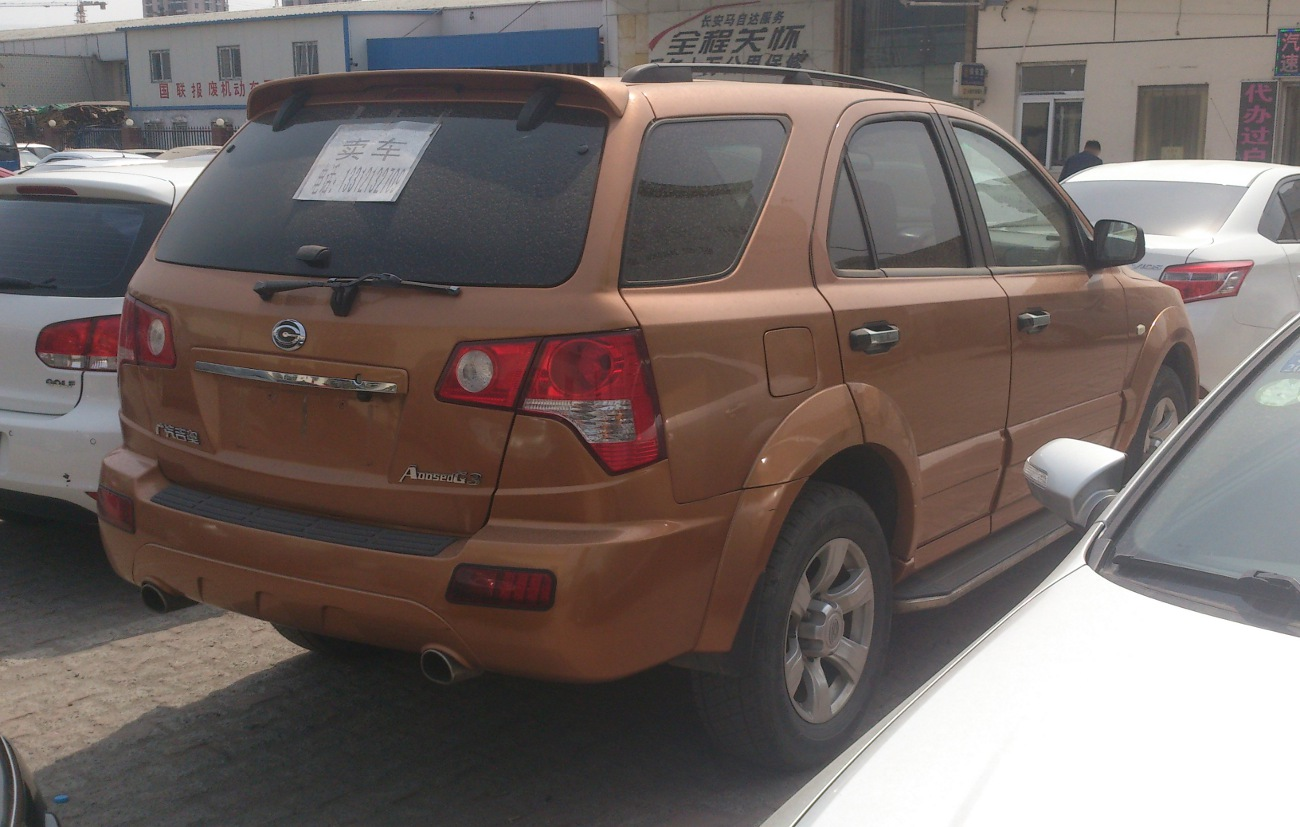
Gonow Aoosed G3 rear

== See also ==
- List of GAC vehicles
