= Gonow Way =

Chinese microvan

Gonow Xingwang
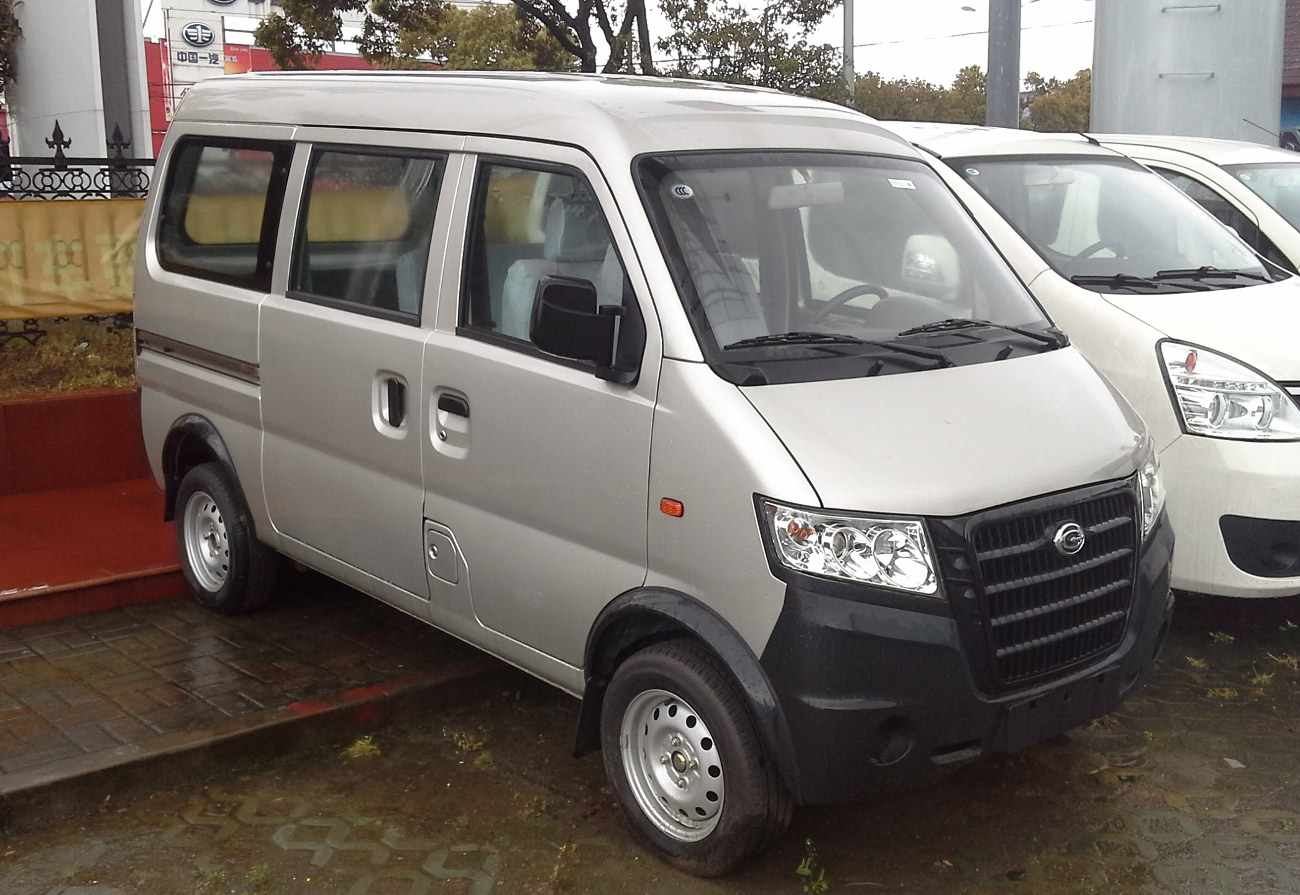
- Gonow Xingwang facelift

Overview
- Manufacturer: GAC
- Also called: Gonow Xingwang; Dongfeng Ruitaite EM10 (Rebadged electric van by Dongfeng); Dayun E2; Farizon E5; Boidge HY-EV
- Production: 2012—2016
- Model years: 2012—2016

Body and chassis
- Class: Microvan
- Body style: 5-door microvan 2-door pickup
- Layout: Front engine, rear-wheel drive layout
- Related: DFSK K07

Powertrain
- Engine: 1.0L I4 petrol
- Transmission: 5-Speed manual

Dimensions
- Wheelbase: 99 in (2,515 mm)
- Length: 149 in (3,790 mm)
- Width: 61 in (1,550 mm)
- Height: 76 in (1,930 mm)

The Gonow Xingwang (Chinese: 星旺) or Gonow Way is a Microvan produced by China's Gonow Automobile, a subsidiary of the Guangzhou Automobile.

== Overview ==
The Gonow Way made its debut on the Chinese market in August 2012, with the prices ranging from 25,900 yuan to 29,800 yuan. Engines available includes a 1.0L producing 60 hp (44 kW) at 5600rpm and a torque of 85N·m mated to a 5-speed manual gearbox.

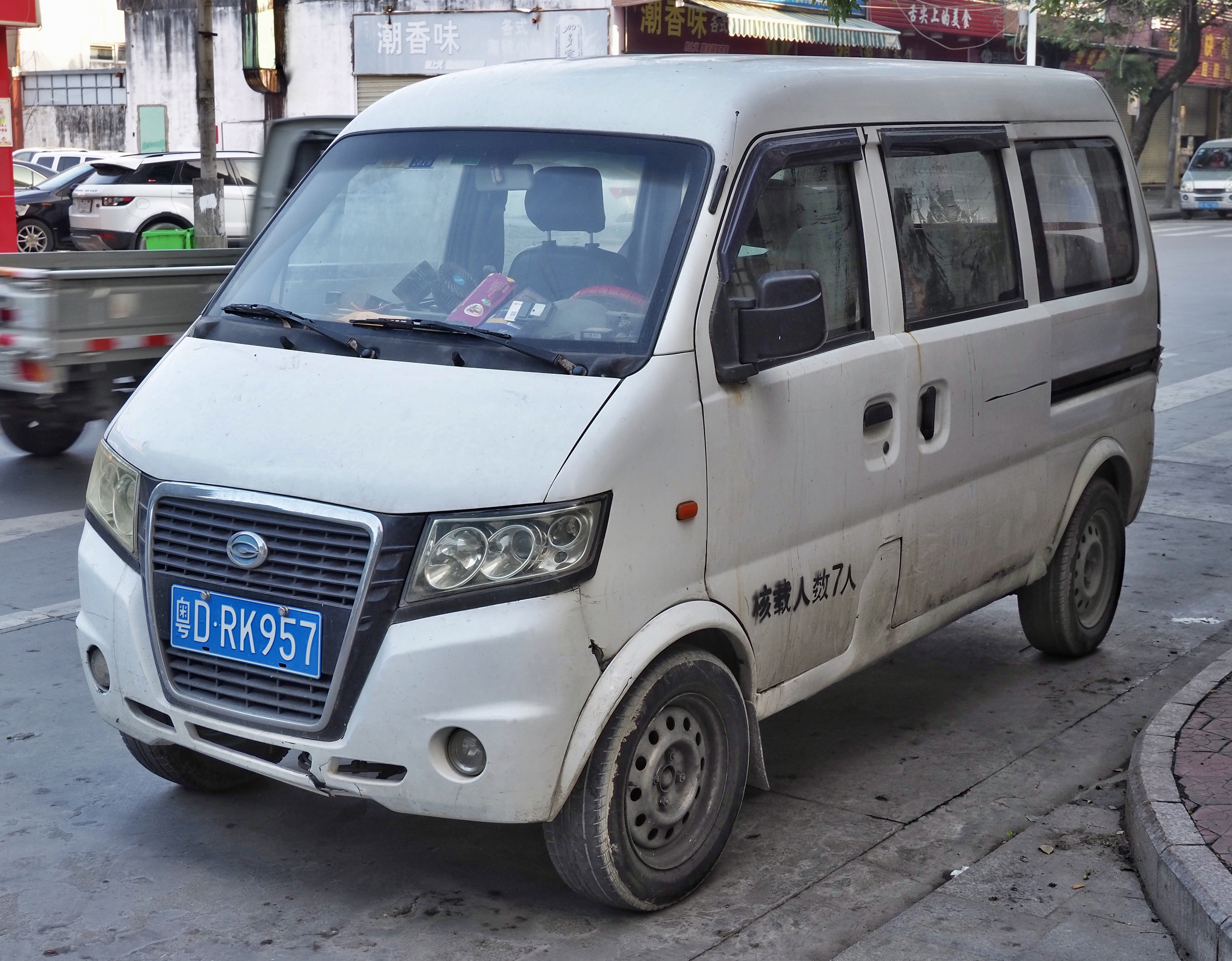
Gonow Xingwang facelift front

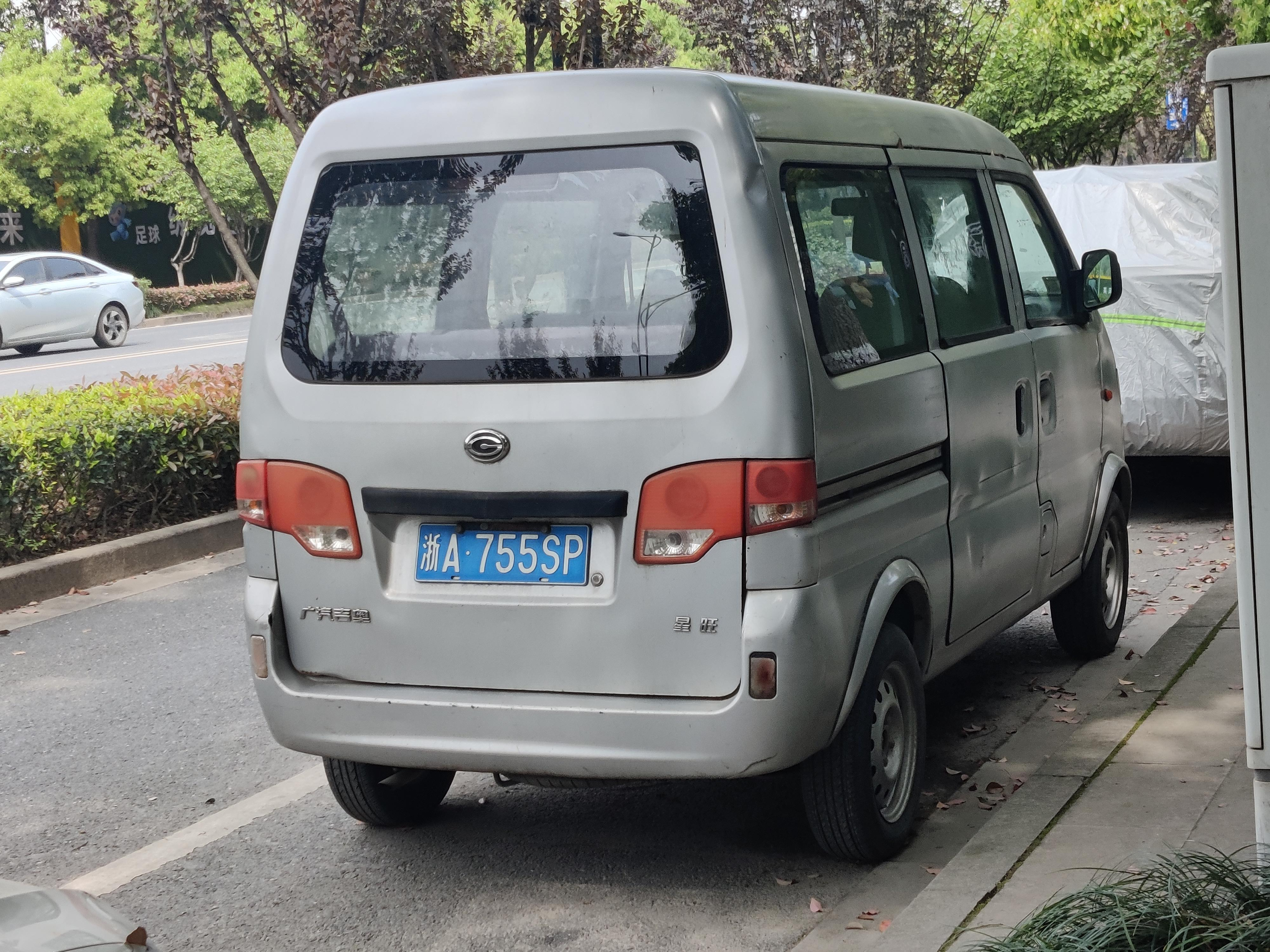
Gonow Xingwang facelift rear

=== Gonow Way L ===
The Gonow Xingwang L or Gonow Way L is the long wheelbase version of the regular Gonow Way, the length is 180mm longer and the wheelbase is 100mm longer. Prices of the Gonow Xingwang L ranges from 32,900 yuan to 34,800 yuan.

=== Gonow Way CL ===
The Gonow Xingwang CL or Gonow Way CL is the longer and more premium version of the Gonow Way L, the length is 360mm longer and the wheelbase is 185mm longer than the Gonow Way. Prices of the Gonow Xingwang CL ranges from 36,800 yuan to 45,800 yuan.

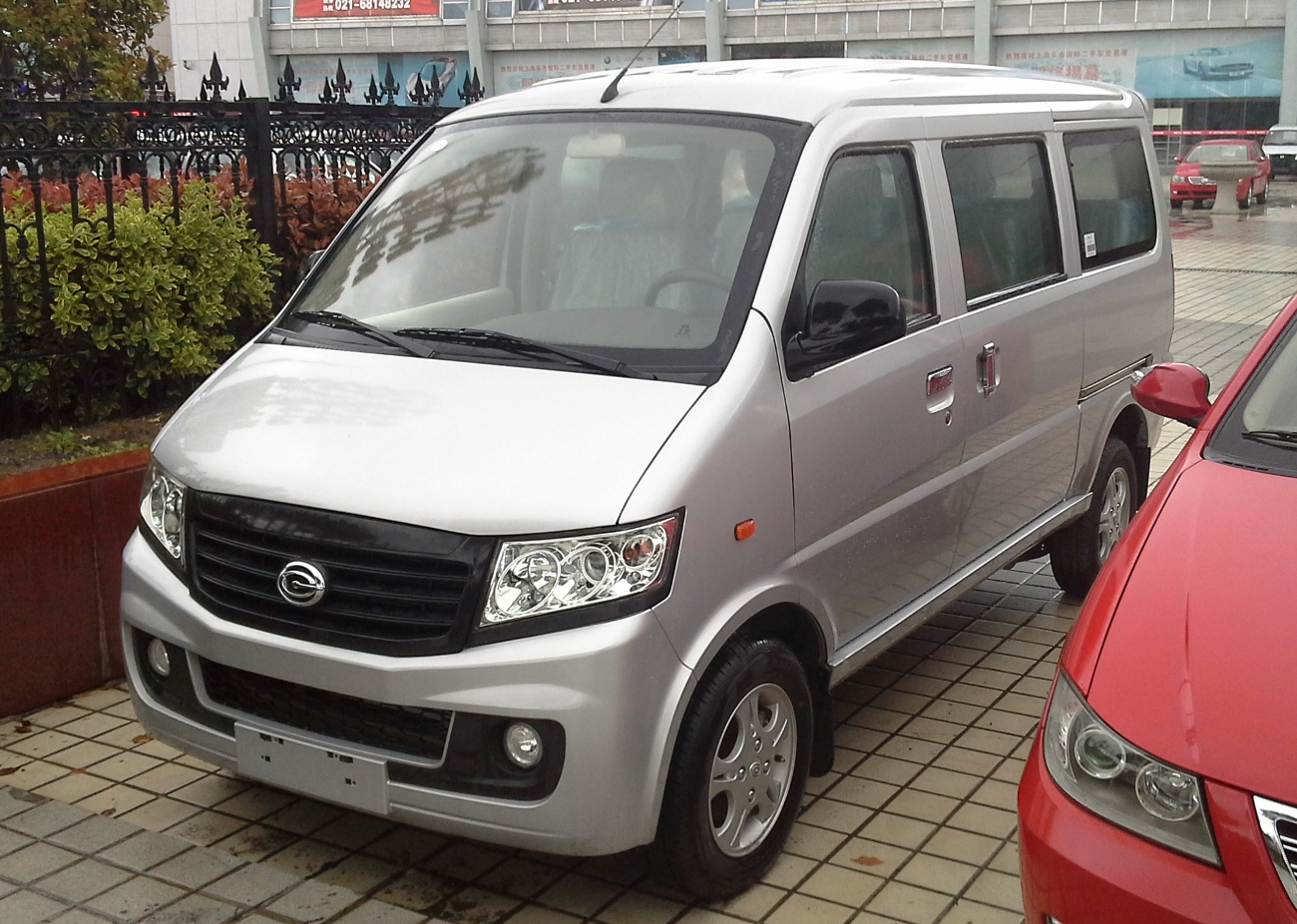
Gonow Xingwang CL front

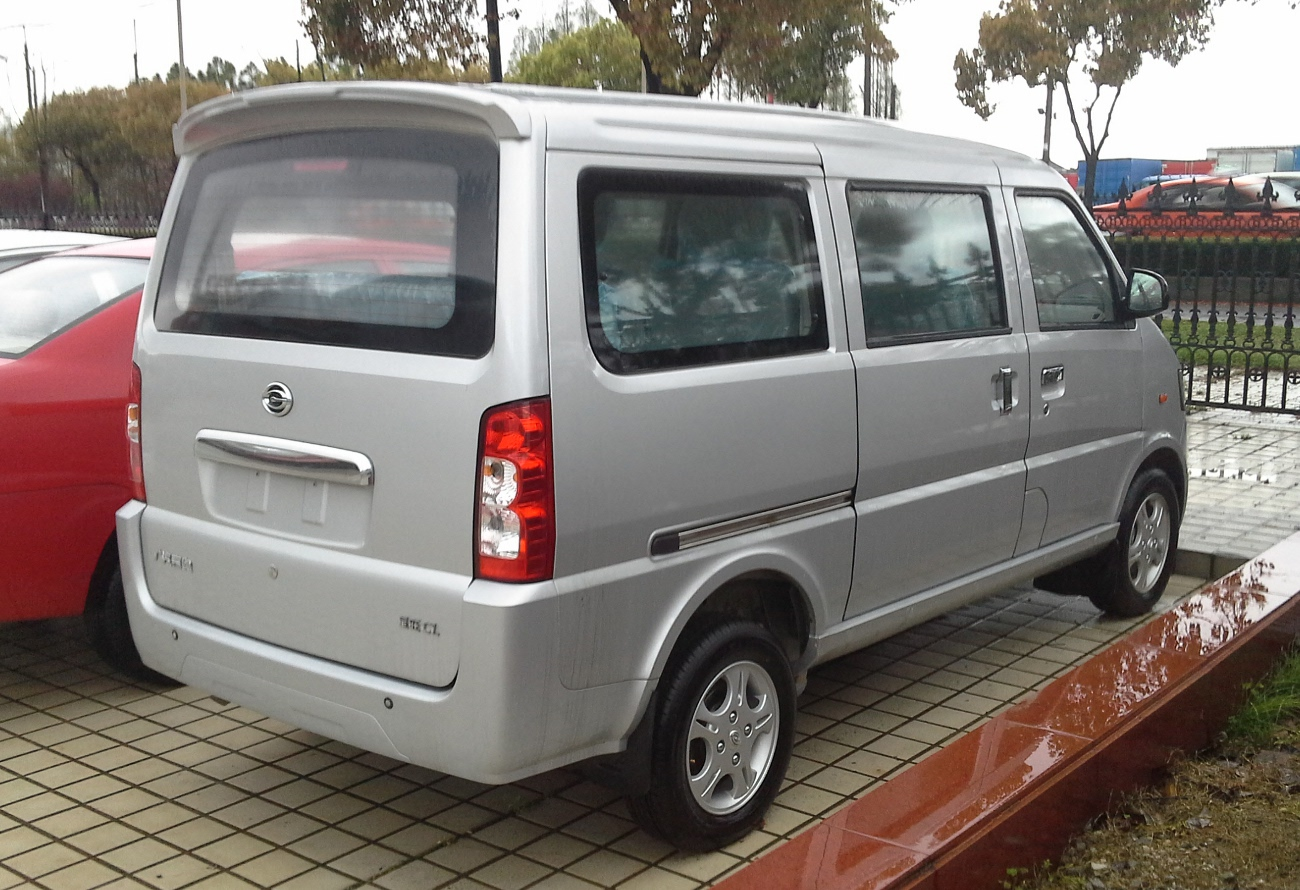
Gonow Xingwang CL 02 rear

=== Gonow Way M1 ===
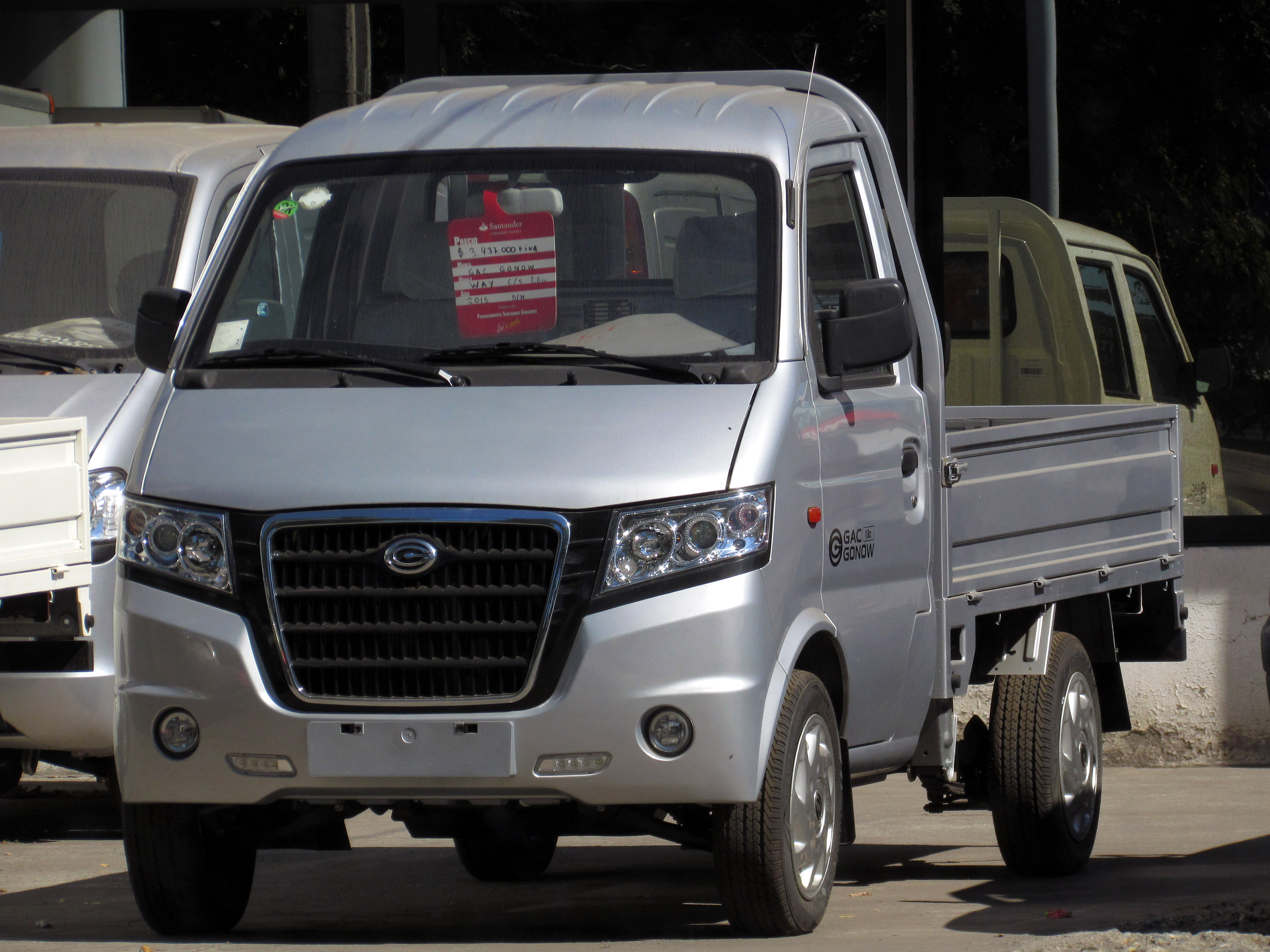
GAC Gonow Way M1 front

The Gonow Xingwang M1 or Gonow Way M1 is the 2-door pickup version of the regular Gonow Way with the prices ranging from 29,900 yuan to 31,800 yuan.

=== Gonow Way M2 ===
The Gonow Xingwang M2 or Gonow Way M2 is the 4-door pickup version of the regular Gonow Way with the prices ranging from 30,900 yuan to 32,800 yuan.

== New Gonow EM10 and Dongfeng Ruitaite EM10 ==
The New Gonow EM10 and Dongfeng Ruitaite EM10 (瑞泰特 EM10) are rebadged electric panel vans based on the Gonow Way CL by Dongfeng. The Ruitaite EM10 utilizes the vehicle body of the Way CL panel van with little to no further modifications besides the sealed up front grille with the Dongfeng logo and the tailgate still features the stamped Gonow text. The Ruitaite EM10 is powered by an electric motor producing 61 hp and 205N·m. There are three range variants, the 215 km, 255 km and 278 km variants all have the same top speed of 85 km/h. The 255 km variant is equipped with a 41.4kWh battery while the 278 km variant is equipped with a 40.86kWh one.

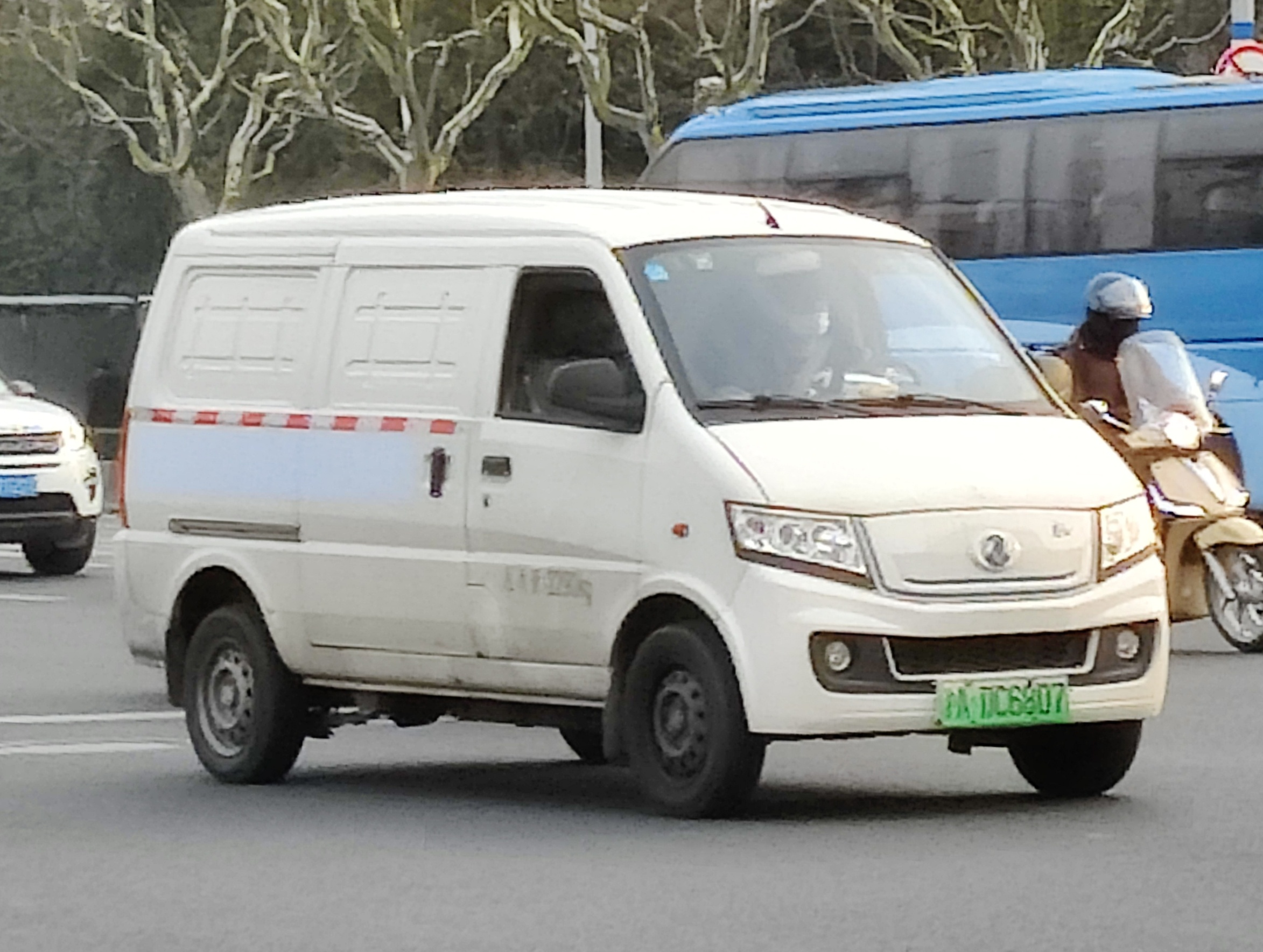
Dongfeng Ruitaite EM10 front

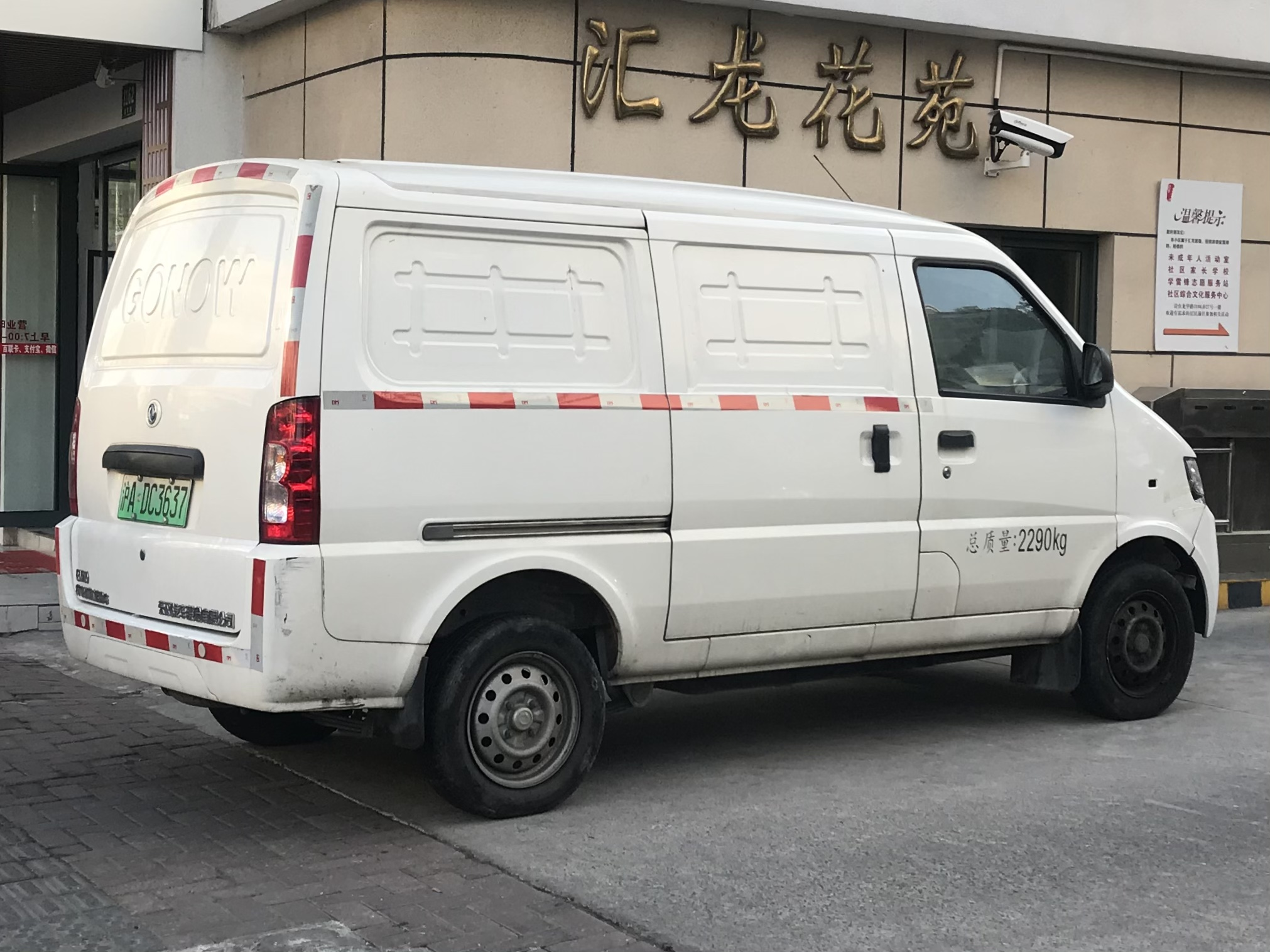
Dongfeng Ruitaite EM10 rear with the Gonow-stamped tailgate

== See also ==
- List of GAC vehicles
