= Gonow Xinglang =

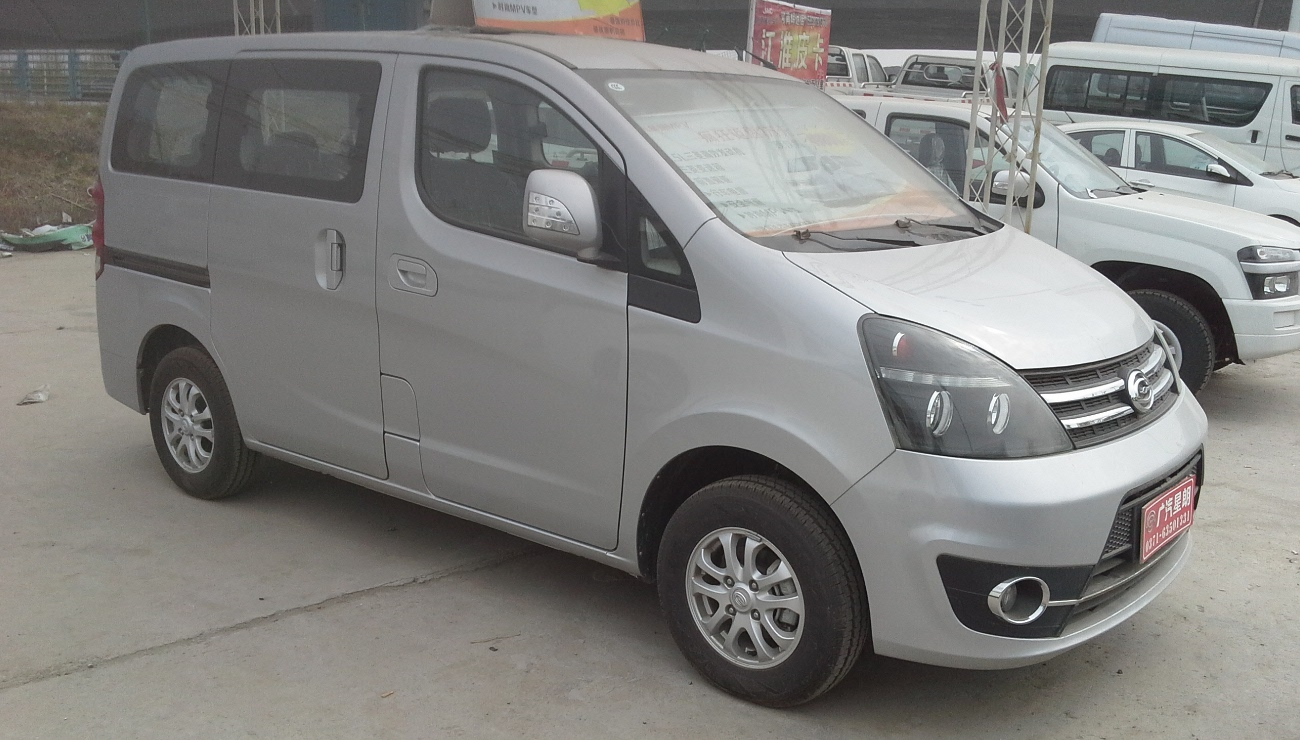
- Gonow Xinglang facelift

Overview
- Manufacturer: GAC
- Also called: Gonow Starry
- Production: 2013—2016
- Model years: 2014—2016

Body and chassis
- Class: Multi Purpose Vehicle/Leisure activity vehicle (M)
- Body style: 5-door minivan
- Layout: Front engine, front-wheel drive layout

Powertrain
- Engine: petrol 1.3 LI4 petrol 1.5 LI4
- Transmission: 5-Speed manual

Dimensions
- Wheelbase: 107 in (2,730 mm)
- Length: 173 in (4,405 mm)
- Width: 67 in (1,705 mm)
- Height: 72 in (1,835 mm)

The Gonow Xinglang (Chinese: 星朗) or Gonow Starry is a compact Multi Purpose Vehicle produced by China's Gonow Automobile, a subsidiary of Guangzhou Automobile. Patent was applied and granted in November 2011 with the launch of the production version in 2013 as a 2014 model.

The van was initially known as the Gonow GA6440.

== History ==
The Xinglang made its debut on the Chinese market on August 20, 2013 with a ceremony attended by Gonow personnel, the press and other VIPs. Its MSRP is about 52,800 yuan for all models except for the 1.5L Premium, which is sold for 79,800 yuan.

== Design ==
Engines available includes a 1.3L producing 99 hp and a 1.5L producing 113 hp, both mated to a 5-speed manual gearbox.

The Gonow Xinglang is controversial in terms of styling because it heavily resembles the Nissan NV200 despite minor changes.

== Gallery ==
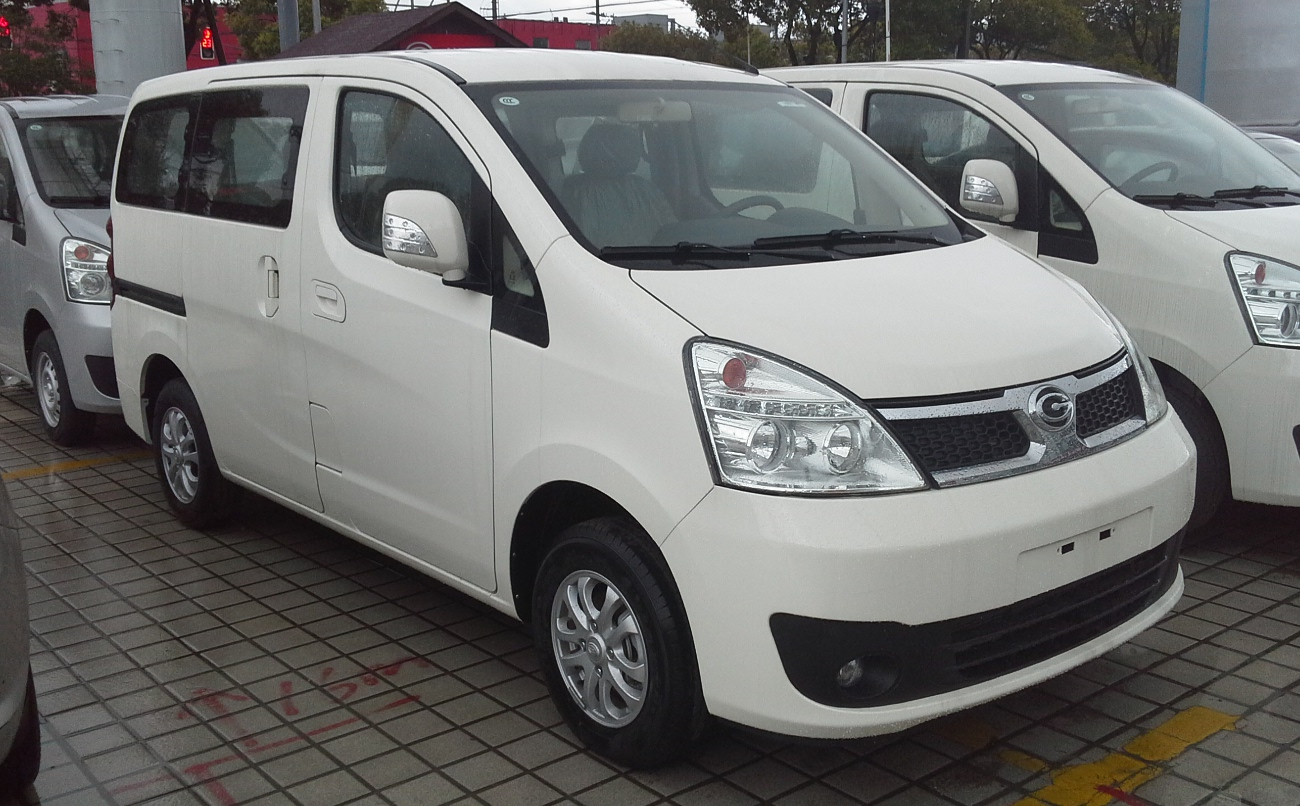
Pre-facelift (front)

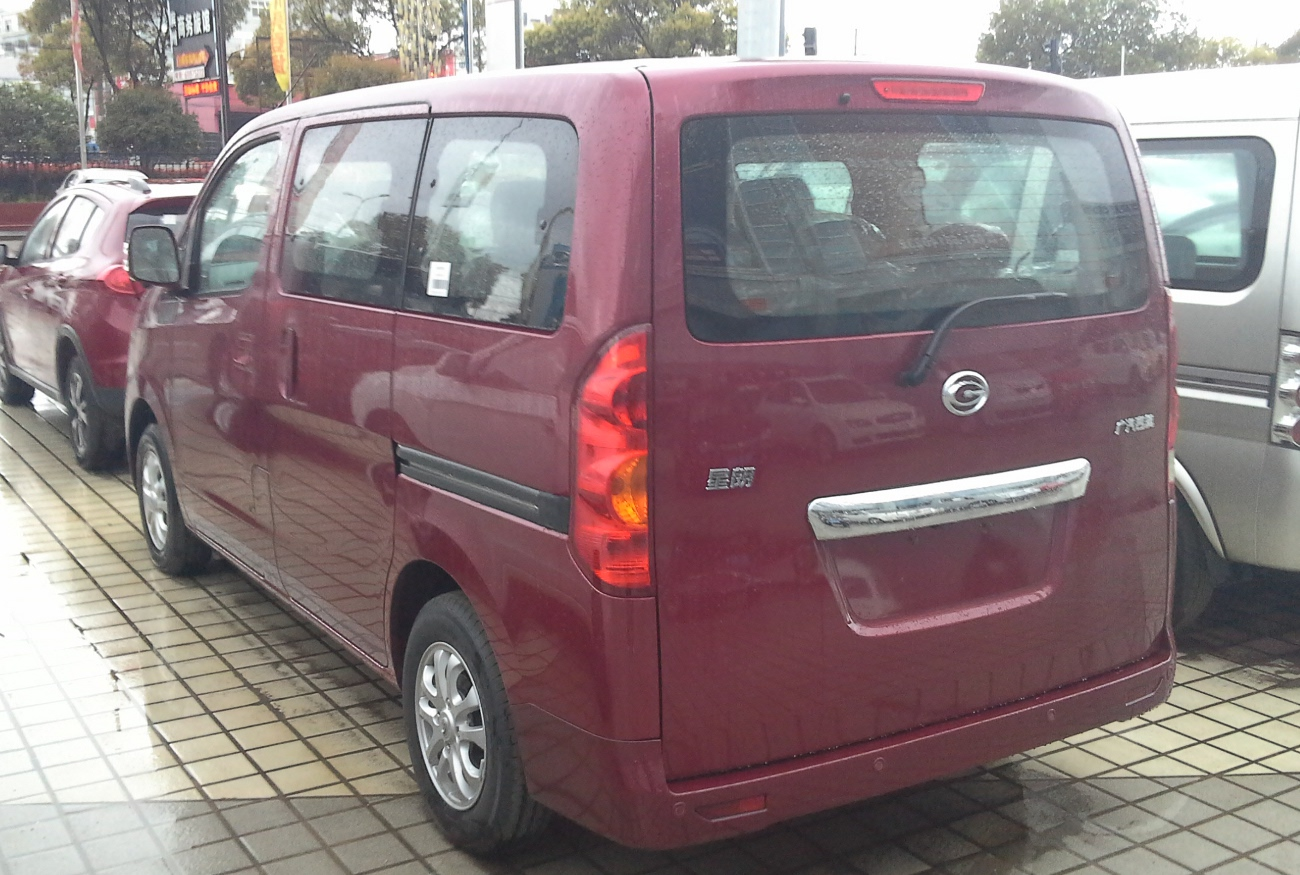
Pre-facelift (rear)

== See also ==
- List of GAC vehicles

Chinese-made NV200 clones

- Refine M3 - Second Chinese-made NV200 clone in 2014.
- BYD M3 DM - Third Chinese-made NV200 clone in 2014.

Original Japanese-made van

- Nissan NV200
