= Gonow =

Chinese vehicle manufacturing company

Zhejiang Gonow Auto Co., Ltd.
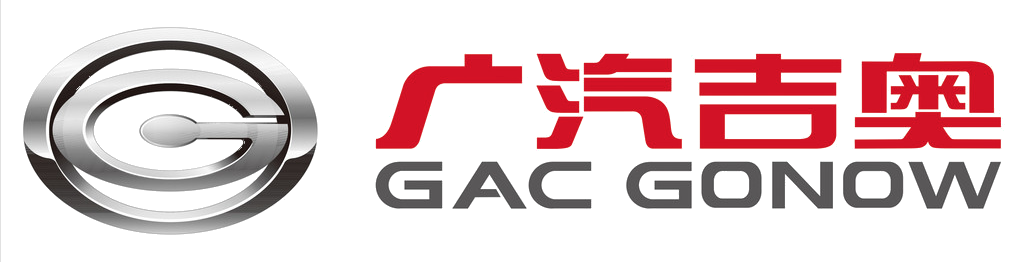
- Type: Subsidiary
- Industry: Automotive
- Founded: 27 September 2003; 22 years ago
- Defunct: 2016
- Fate: Merger with GAC Group
- Headquarters: Taizhou, Zhejiang, China
- Products: Automobiles
- Parent: GAC Group
- Website: gonowauto.com

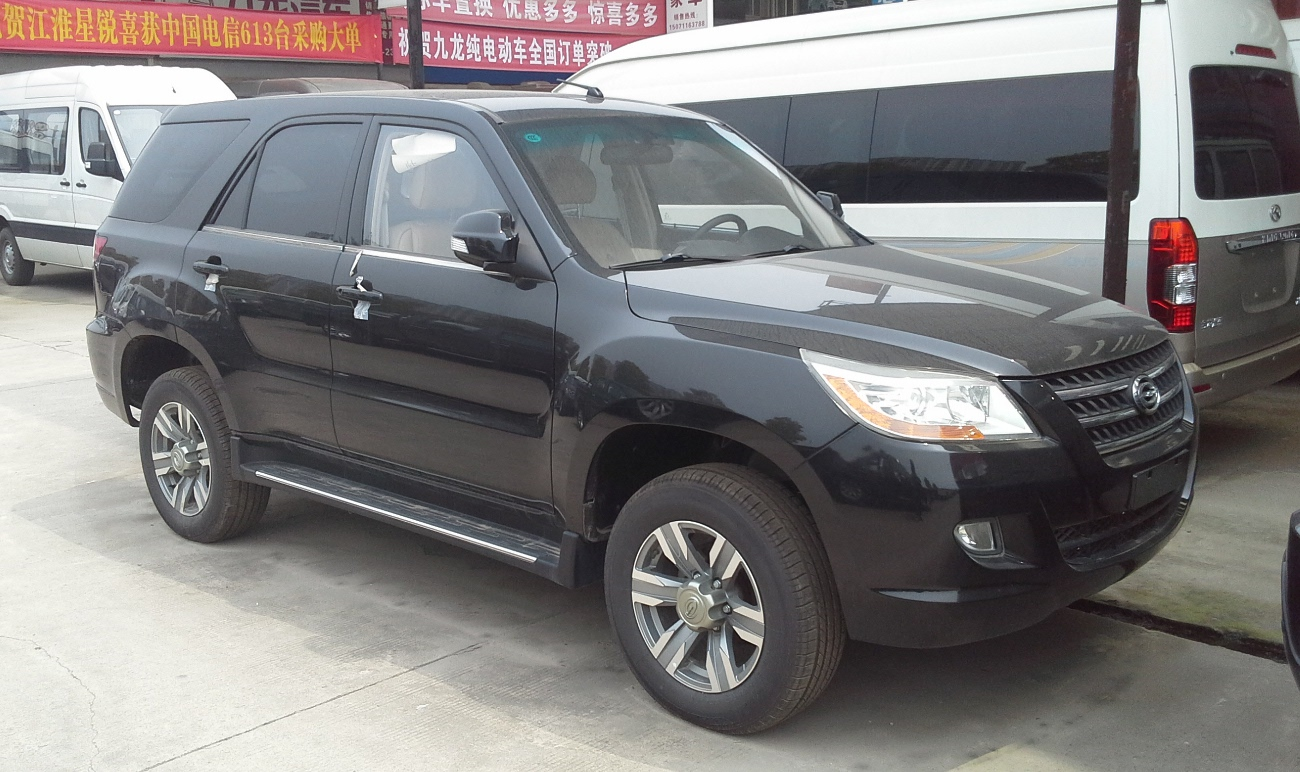
Gonow Aoosed G5 photographed in Wuhan, Hubei province, China.

Gonow (officially Zhejiang Gonow Auto Co., Ltd.) (Chinese: 浙江吉奥汽车有限公司) is a Chinese manufacturer of automobiles, commercial vehicles and SUV's headquartered in Taizhou, Zhejiang and a subsidiary of GAC Group. It markets its products under the brand name GAC Gonow in China and as Gonow in other markets. The brand was discontinued in 2016. Starting in 2009, Gonow vehicles were exported to Italy and registered as commercial vehicles up to 3.5 tonnes.

== History ==
Founded on 27 September 2003, in Taizhou, Zhejiang, the company occupied a 268,000 m^{2} Campus. Production launched with the Gonow AGE, with an initial production of 60,000 units. Gonow spent 351.5 million RMB expanding its grounds by 100 acres, and production was increased to 200,000 units per year. Gonow partnered with Wuhan University of Technology, taking over construction of the Gonow Automobile R&D Center.

In 2006, Gonow entered the European Union market, in a joint venture with the Italian company DR Motor Company SpA. Two SUV models were produced under license, and were marketed under the brand name Katay Gonow.

On 24 October 2010, Gonow was the first Chinese car to score points in a FIA world championship, with its Italian Team Sonia Ielo – Francesca Olivoni taking 8th place in the Ecorally San Marino – Vatican City of the FIA Alternative Energies Cup.

In 2010, Guangzhou Automobile Group Co. (GAC) bought 51% of Gonow. Gonow announced in March 2015 that the company will start concentrating on constructing Trumpchi vehicles, raising anger from its dealers since the unsold Gonow vehicles and spare parts were mortgaged by various banks.

In 2015, GAC Group announced that Gonow will be integrated into the company as a subsidiary. It's been reported that the 49% stake of Gonow will be purchased and will halt further production/sales in 2016 due to problems in committing to aftermarket sales and production/delivery of its vehicles to Gonow dealers.

== Former Products ==
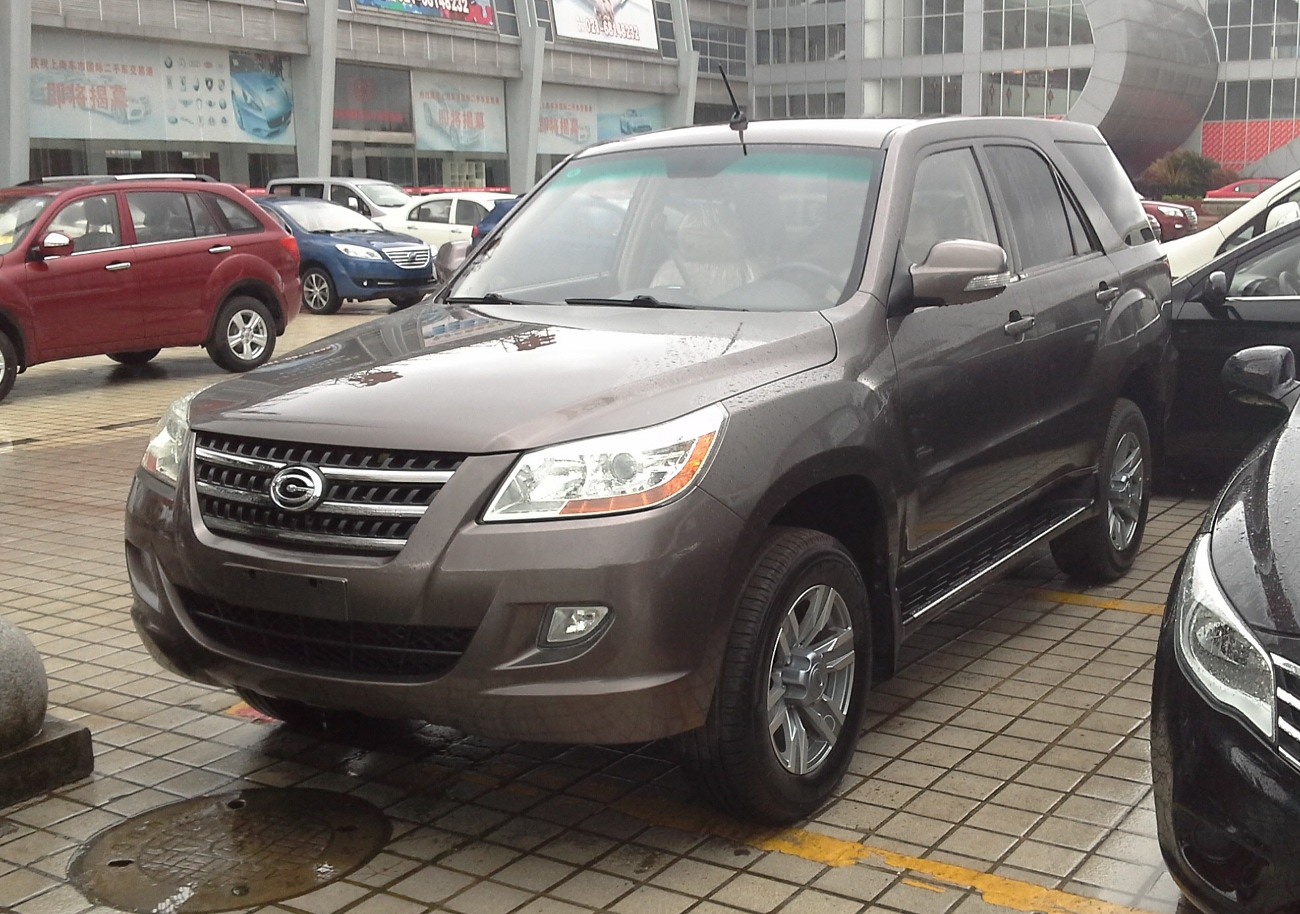
Gonow G5

- Gonow Starry (Xinglang/ 星朗) (2013–2016)
- Gonow GX6 (2014–2016)
- Gonow Troy 500 (财运 500/FAN) (2009–2016)
- Gonow GP150 (2015-2016)
- Gonow Way/GA6380 (Xingwang/ Star Wang/ 星旺) (2010-2017)
- Gonow Way L (星旺 L) (2012-2016)
- Gonow Way CL (星旺 CL) (2012-2016)

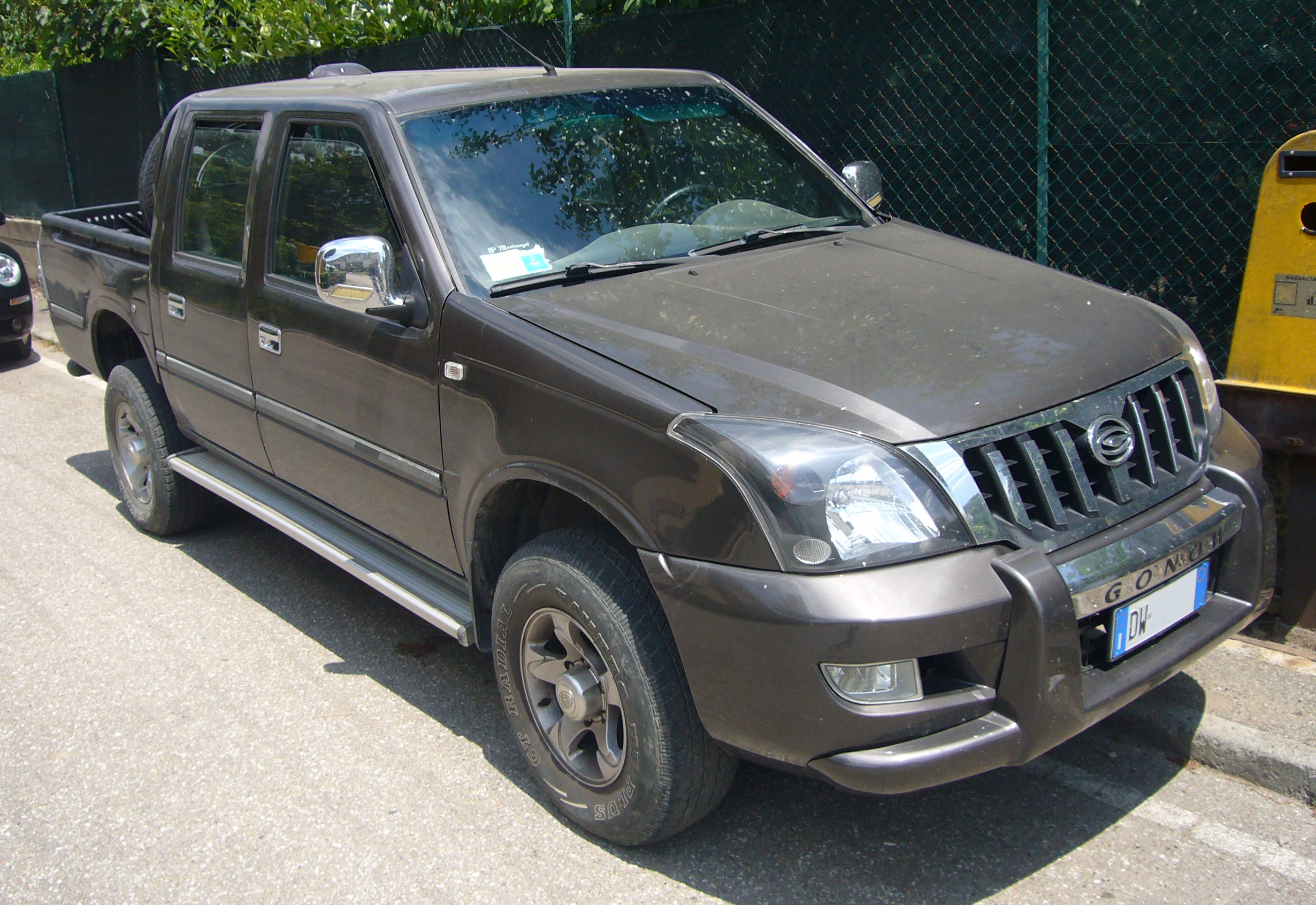
Gonow GA200 (Troy)

- Gonow Alter (since 2003)
- Gonow Dual Luck (since 2003)
- Gonow Troy 200 (财运) (since 2005)
- Gonow FAN (since 2005)
- Gonow Finite (since 2010)
- Gonow GA6530 (since 2010), a van based on the Toyota HiAce (H100) with a restyled front end that resembles the Toyota HiAce (H200)
- Gonow GS-1 (2010-2015)
- Gonow GS-2 (2010-2015)
- Gonow GS50 II (since 2005)
- Gonow Minivan (2008–2010)
- Gonow Saboo (since 2010)
- Gonow Jetstar (since 2003, also known as Shuaijian) also known as GS50 from 2005
- Gonow Lightweight (since 2010)
- Gonow E Mei (since 2014)
- Gonow Troy 300 (财运 300) (2007–2009)
- Gonow Aoosed G5 (2010–2014)

=== Katay Gonow ===
- Katay Gonow Troy (since 2006)
- Katay Gonow Victor (since 2006)
- Katay Gonow Victory (since 2006)

== Product gallery ==
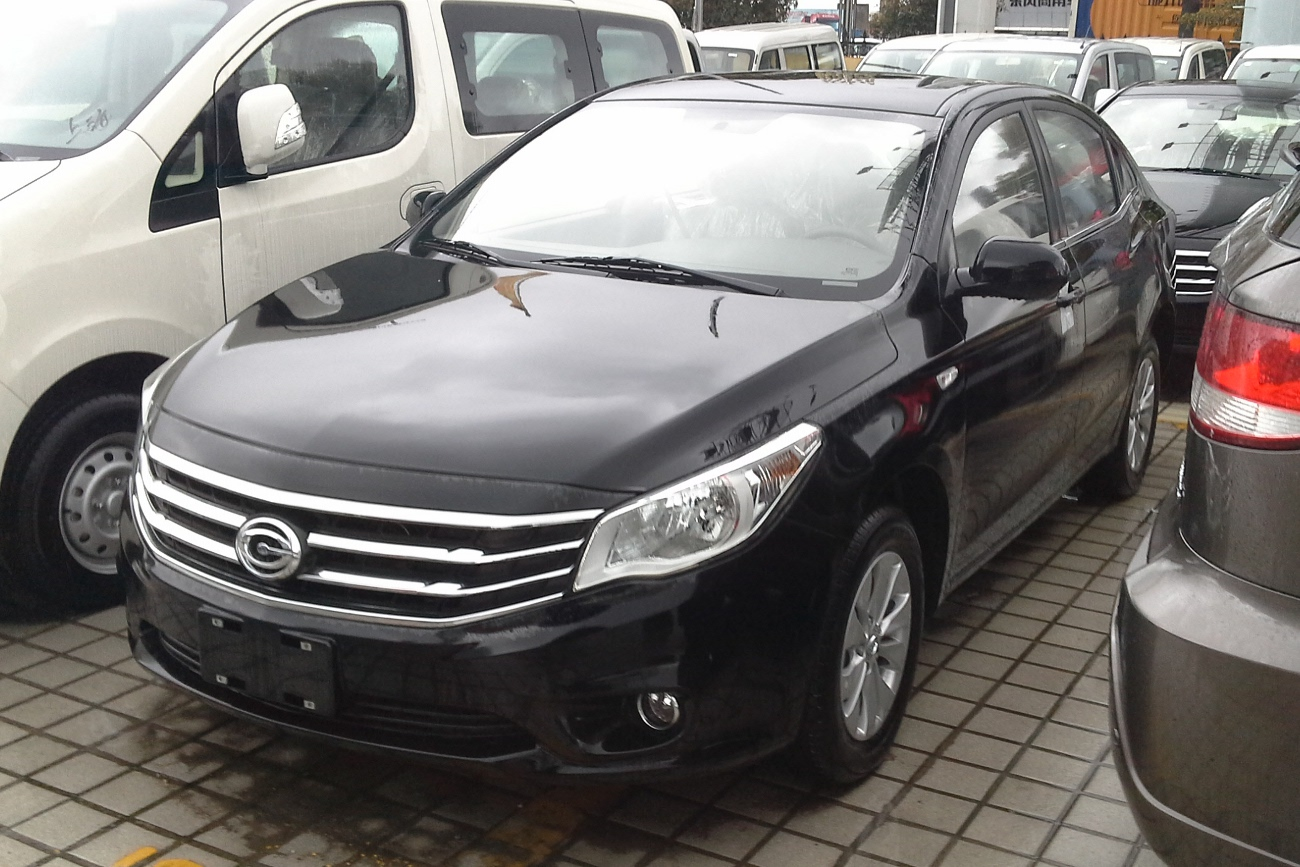
Gonow Emei

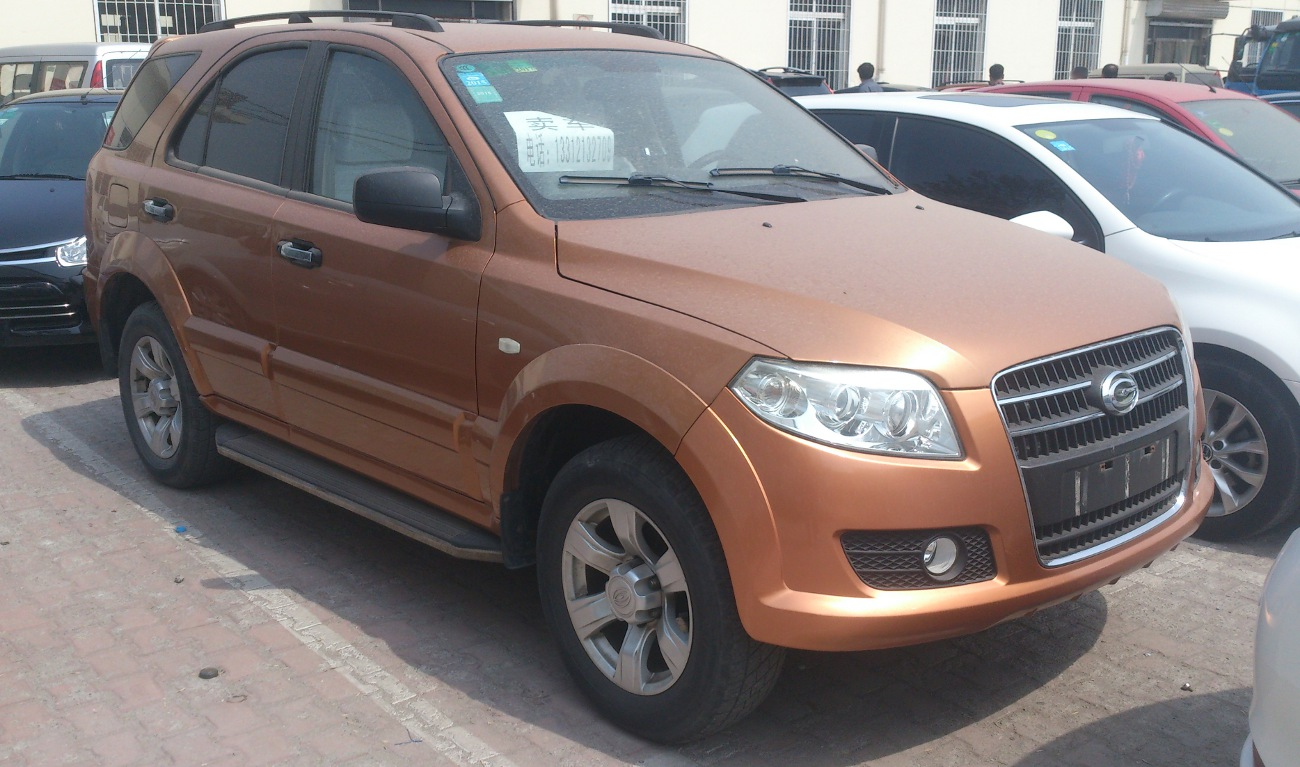
Gonow G3

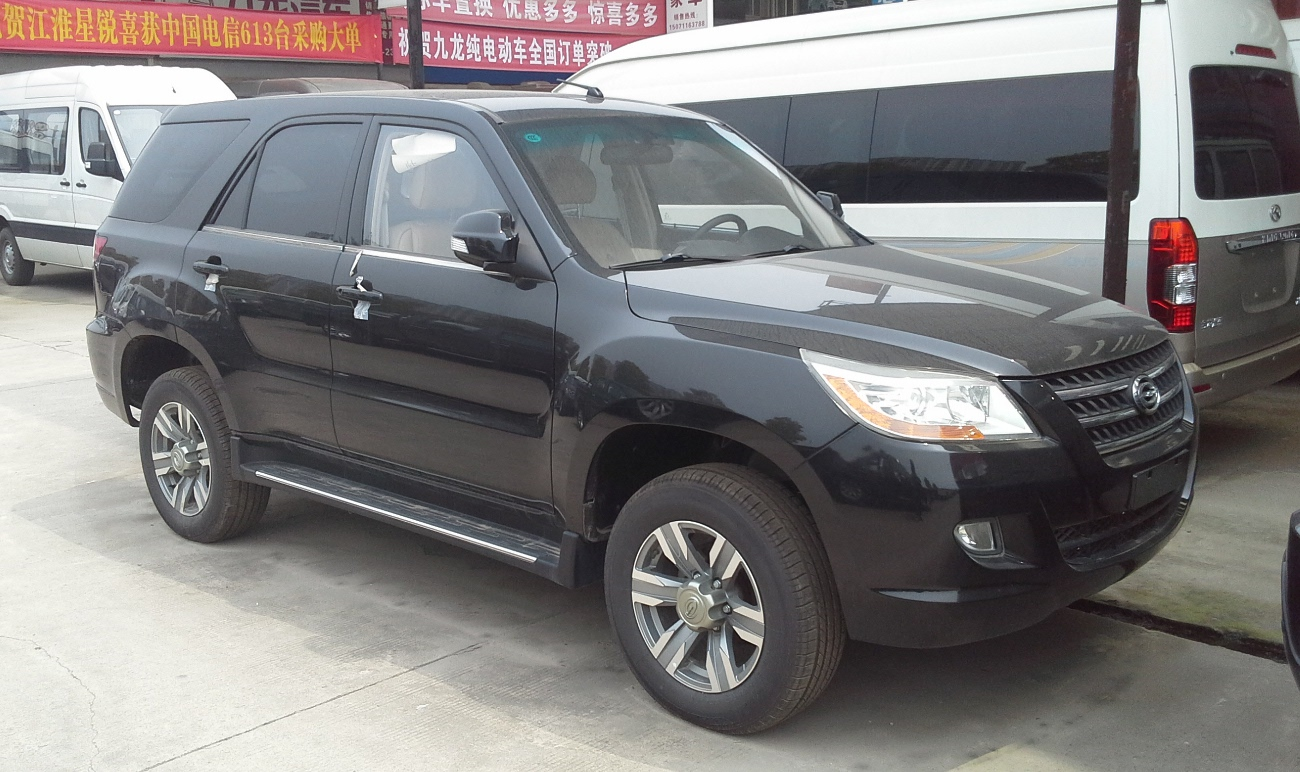
Gonow G5

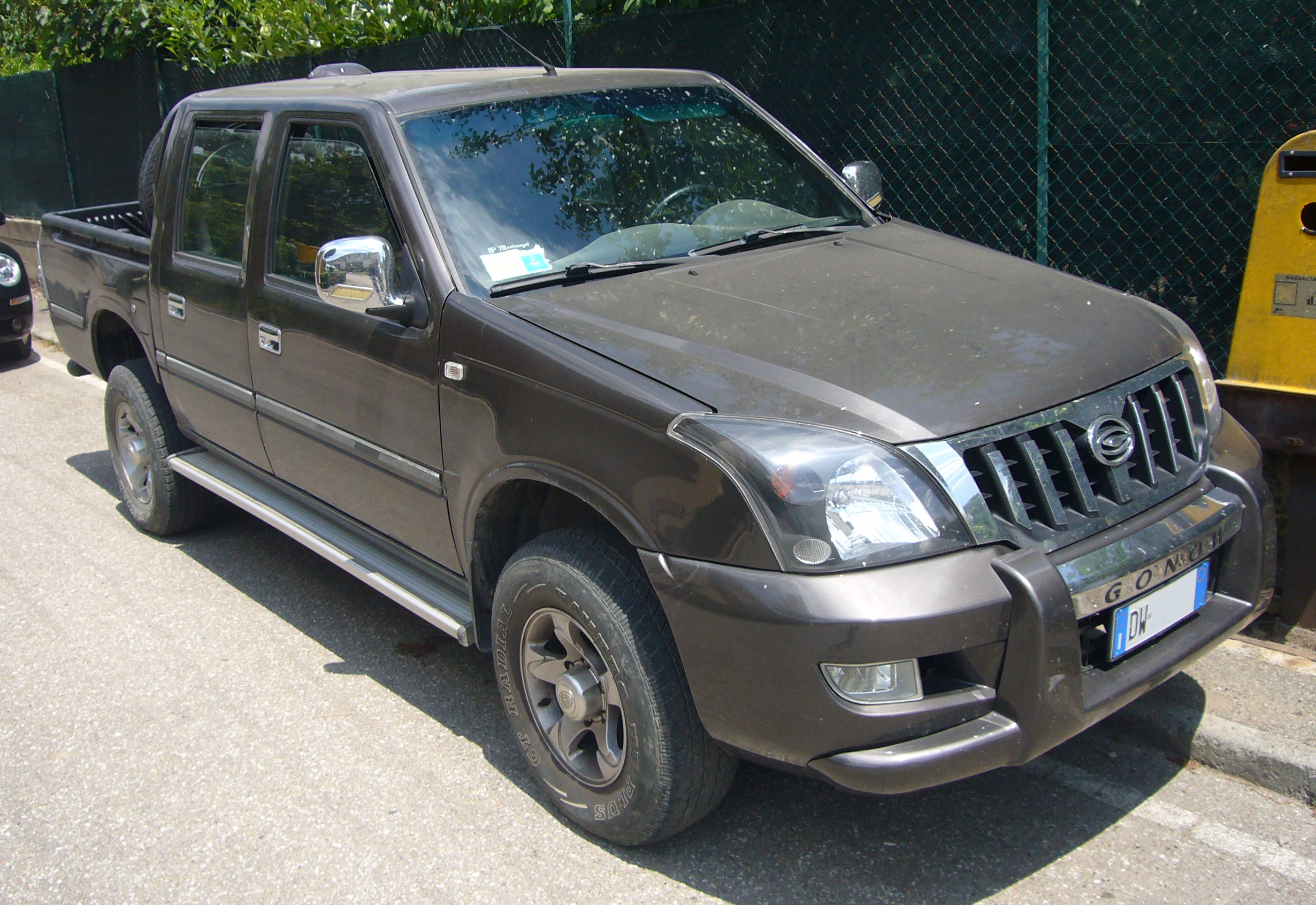
Gonow GA200 (Troy)

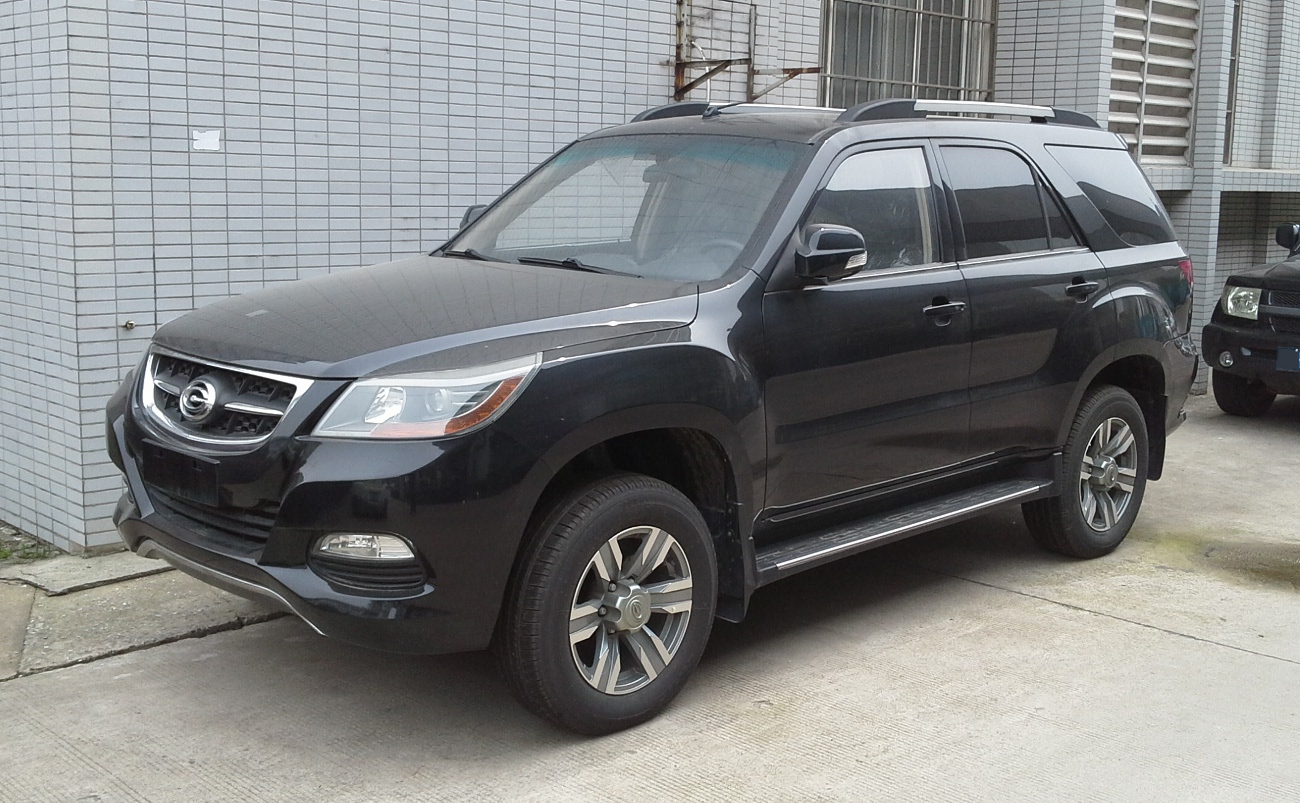
Gonow GX5

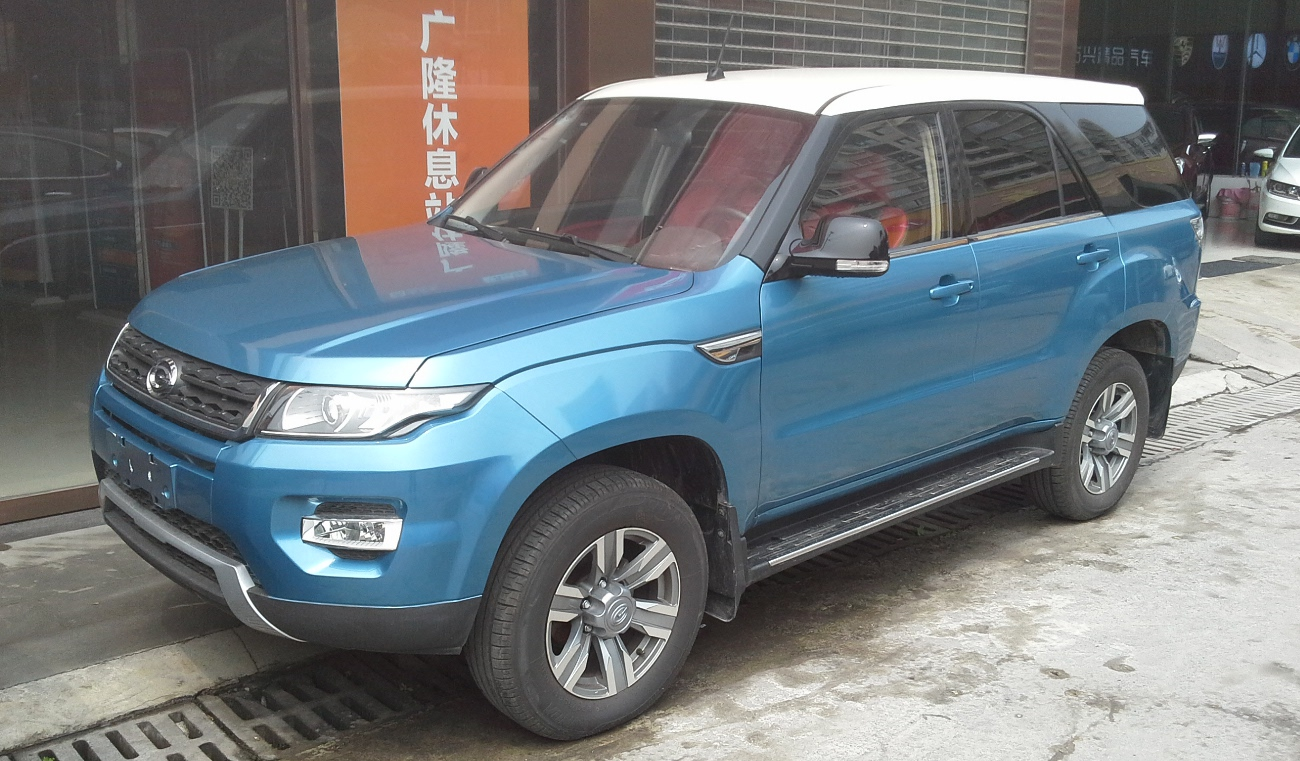
Gonow GX6

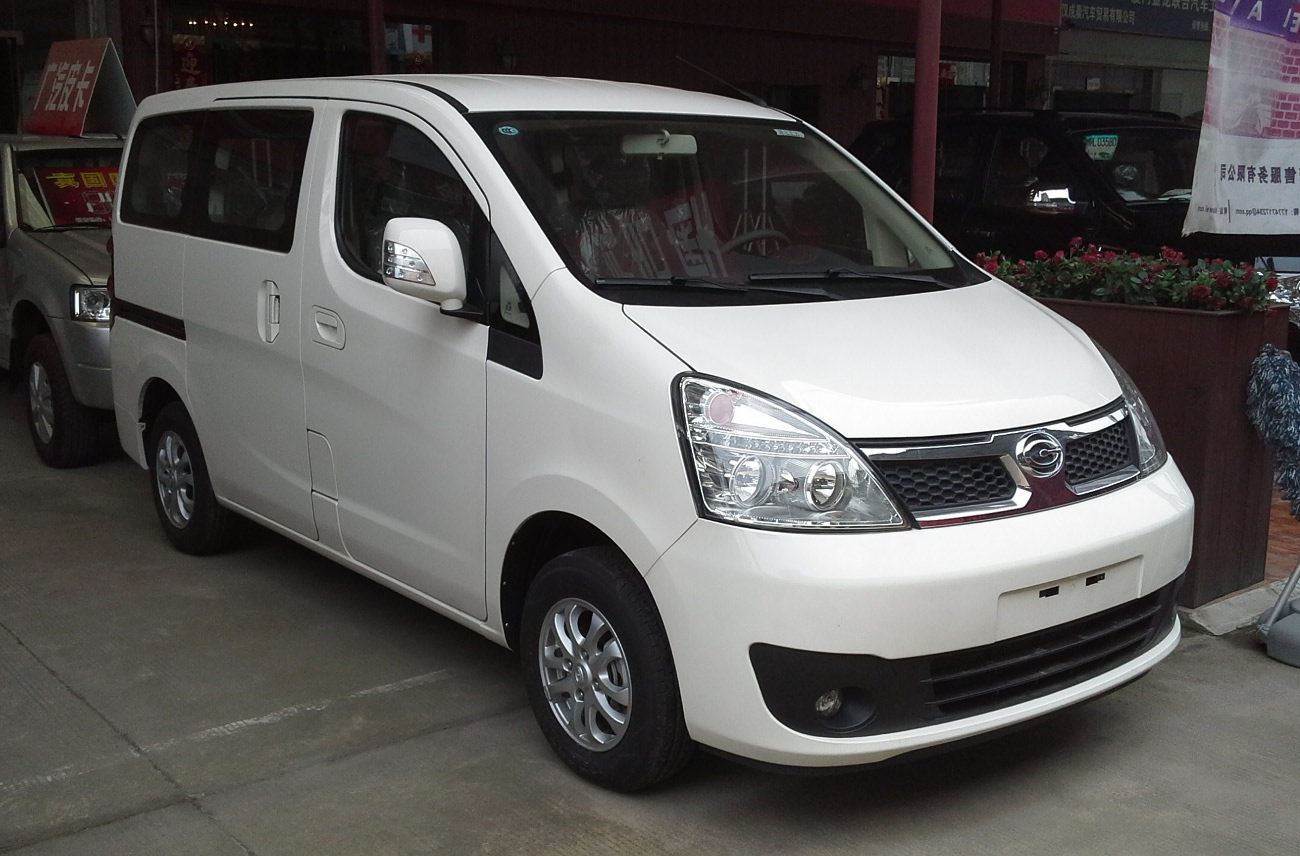
Gonow Starry

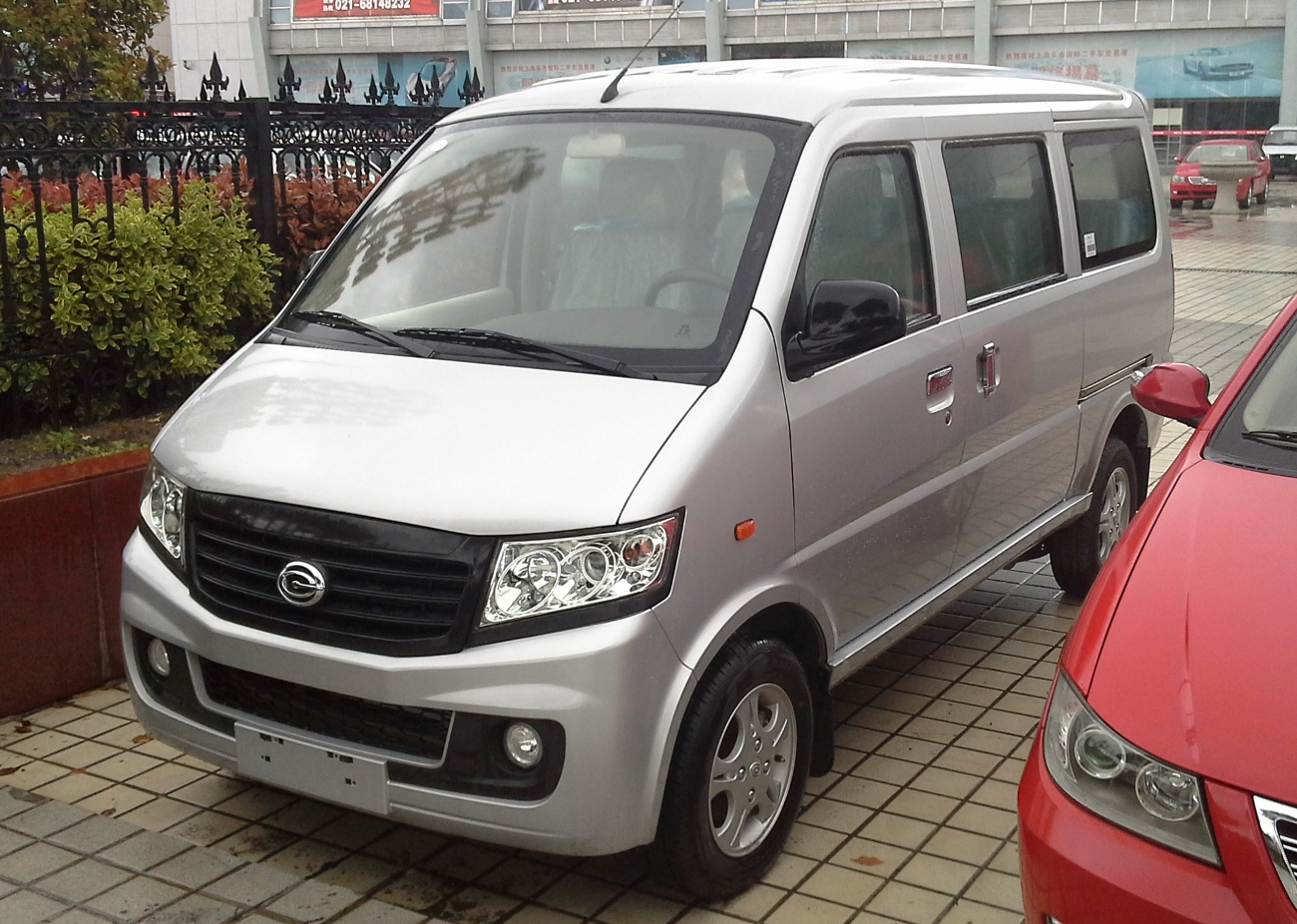
Gonow Way CL

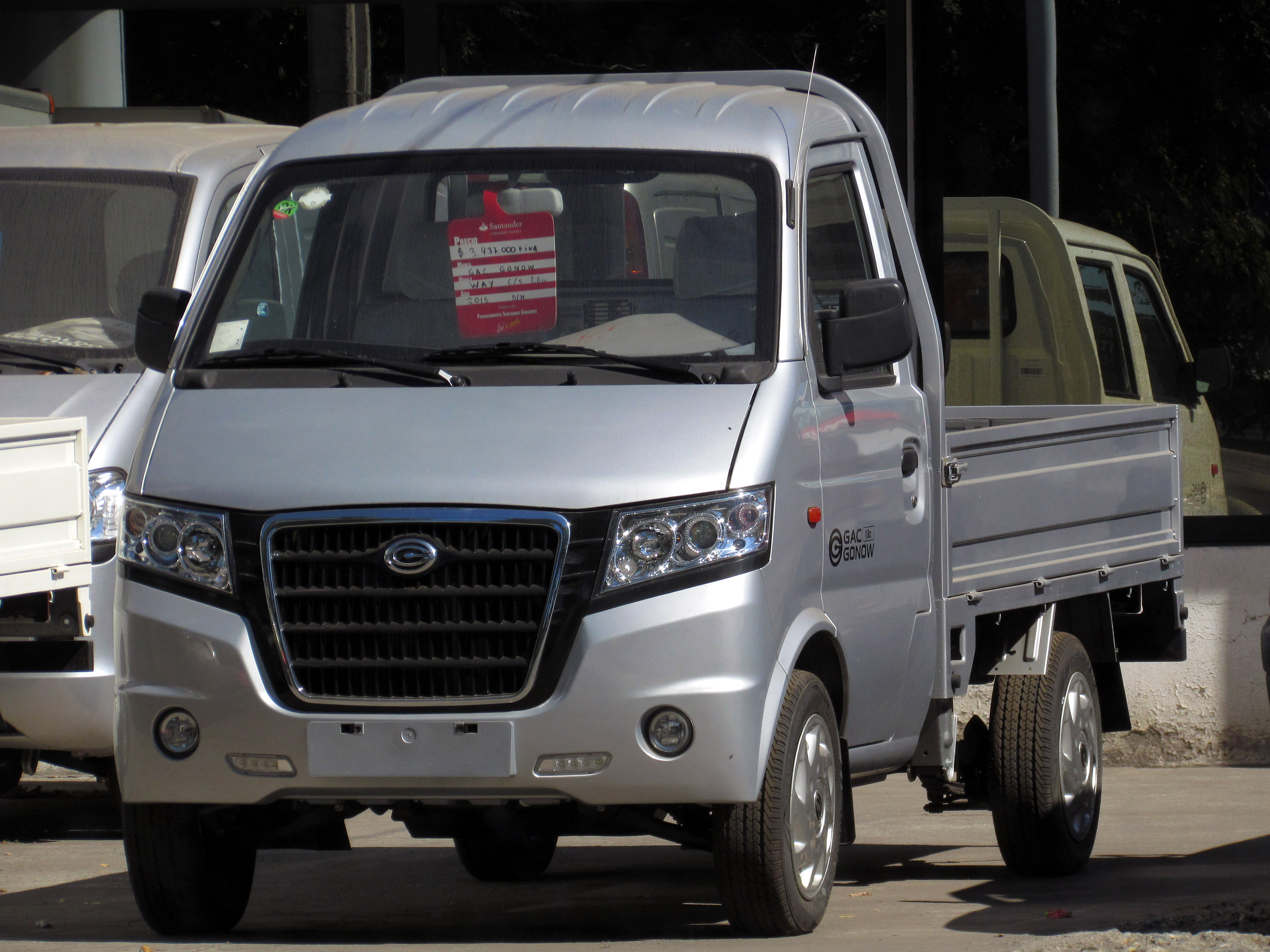
Gonow Way M1

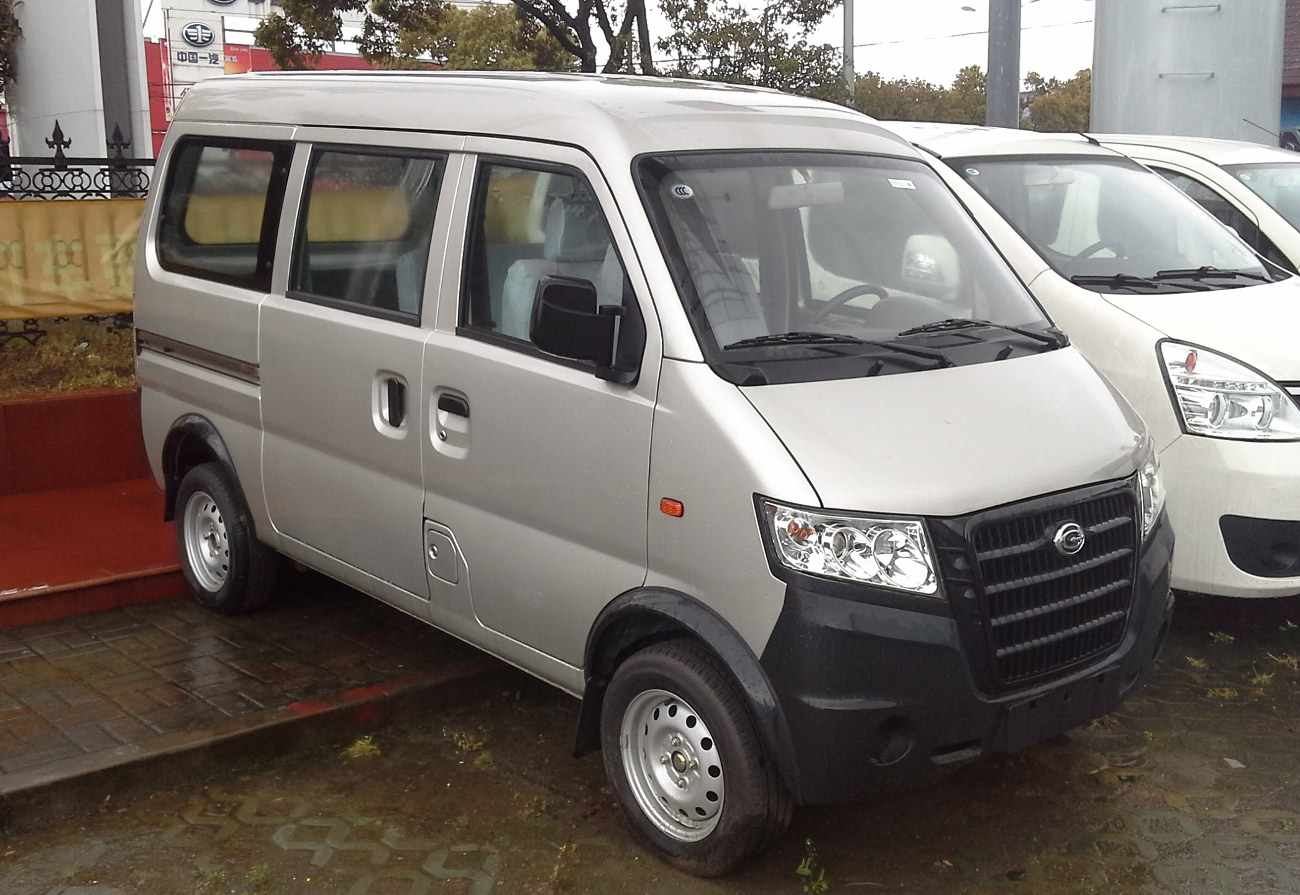
Gonow Way V1
