= Huanghai Challenger =

Chinese automobile

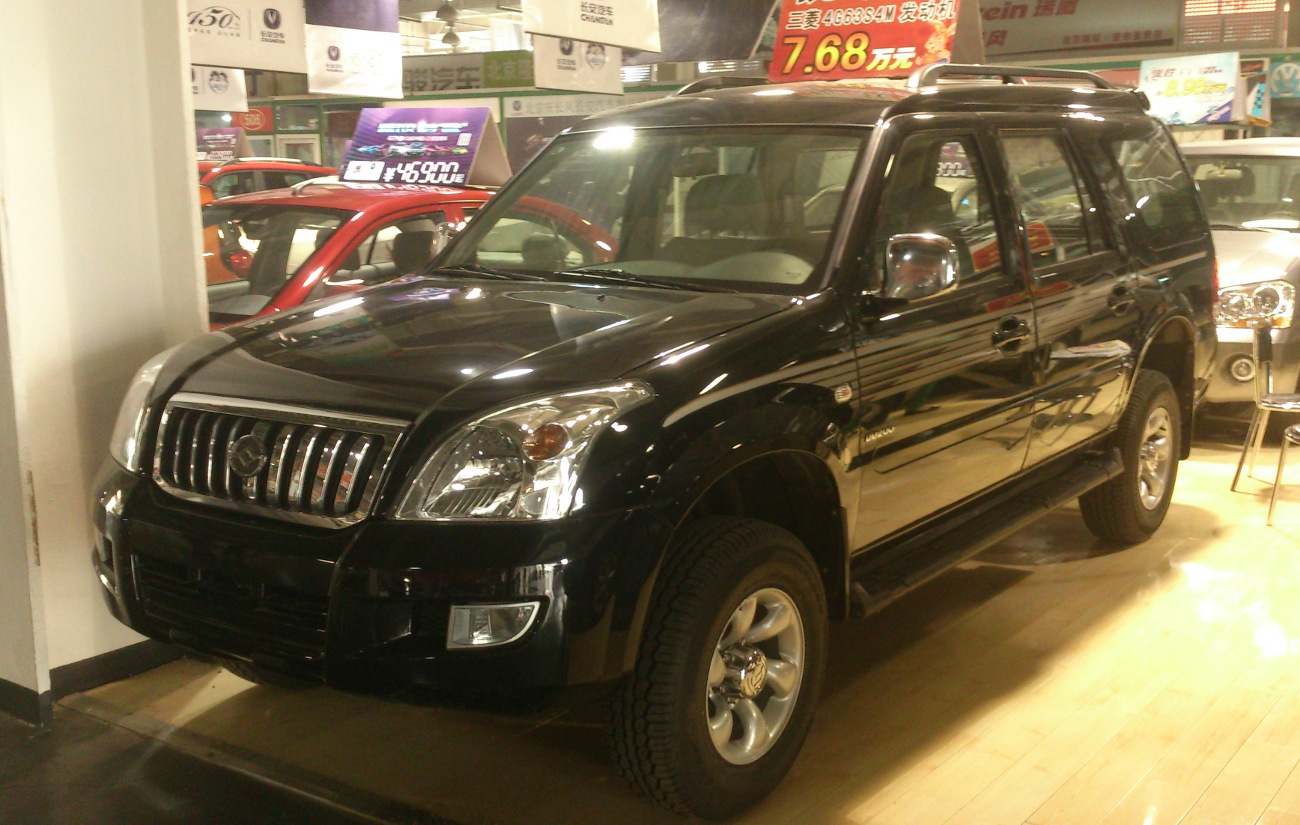

Overview
- Manufacturer: SG Automotive
- Also called: Huanghai Navigator; Huanghai Dawn; Huanghai Falcon; Gonow Jetstar; Dadi Shuttle; Derways Shuttle; JAC K3; Pyeonghwa Pronto GS (Vietnam); Pyeonghwa Ppeokkugi GS (North Korea)
- Production: 2009–2012

Powertrain
- Engine: 2.0 L I4 petrol 2.0L Mitsubishi 4G63S4M petrol 2.4L 4D25 diesel 2.5L CF25TC diesel
- Transmission: 5-speed manual

Dimensions
- Wheelbase: 3,025 mm (119.1 in)
- Length: 4,860–4,900 mm (191.3–192.9 in)
- Width: 1,725 mm (67.9 in)
- Height: 1,850 mm (72.8 in)
- Curb weight: 1650-1790kg

The Huanghai Challenger (Chinese: 挑战者SUV) or Shuguang Challenger is a mid-size SUV manufactured by Huanghai Auto of SG Automotive (曙光汽车) from 2009 to 2012.

== Huanghai Challenger, Huanghai Navigator, Huanghai Dawn, and Huanghai Falcon ==
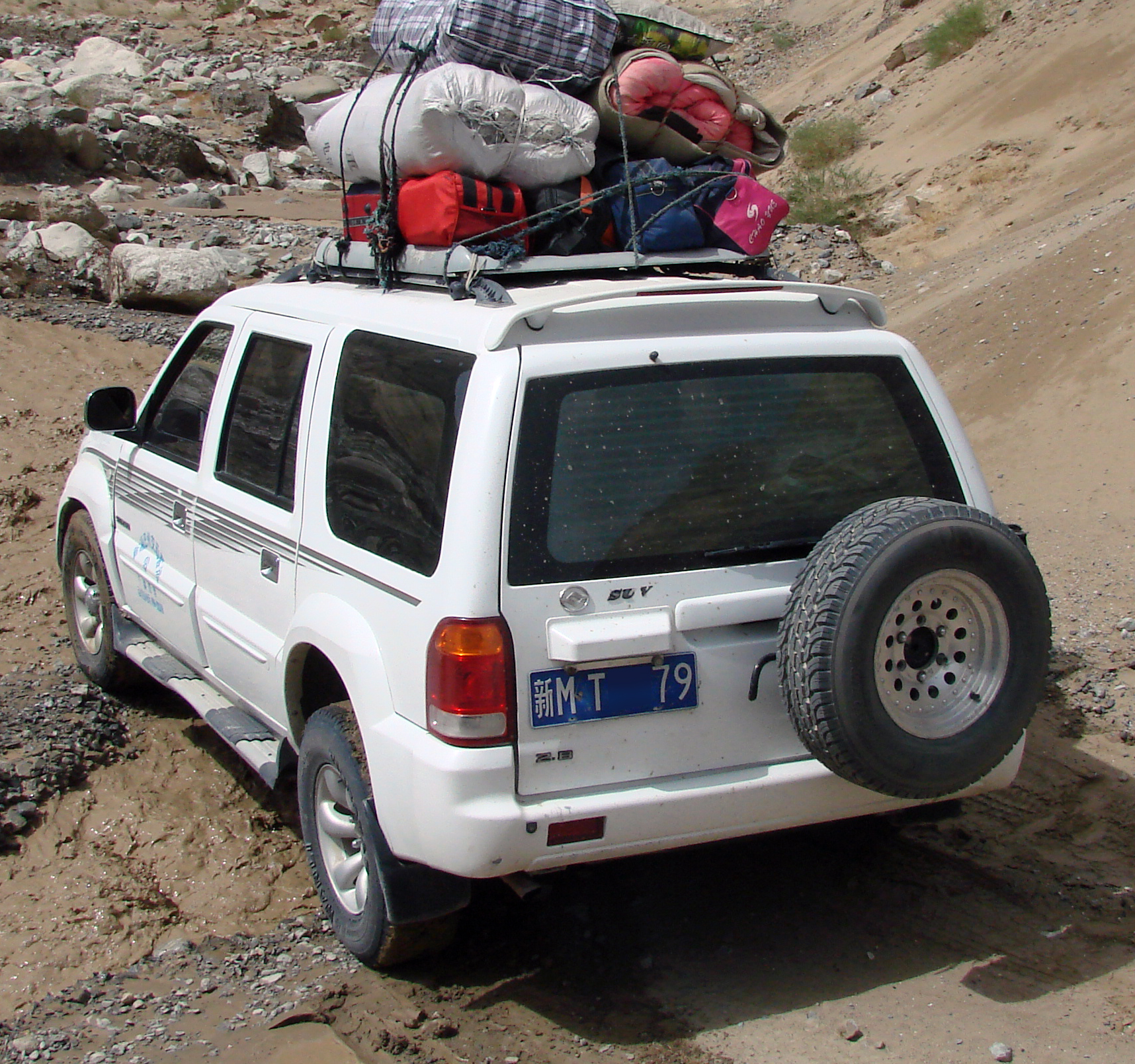
Huanghai Dawn (Challenger) rear

The Huanghai Challenger was sold under the names Huanghai Navigator, Huanghai Dawn, and Huanghai Falcon, depending on the region and model year. Different codes were assigned to the various models, but the specifications and styling remain largely the same. The prices of the Huanghai Challenger range from 69,800 to 81,800 yuan.

== Gonow Kairui/ Kaixuan and Gonow Troy 100/200 ==
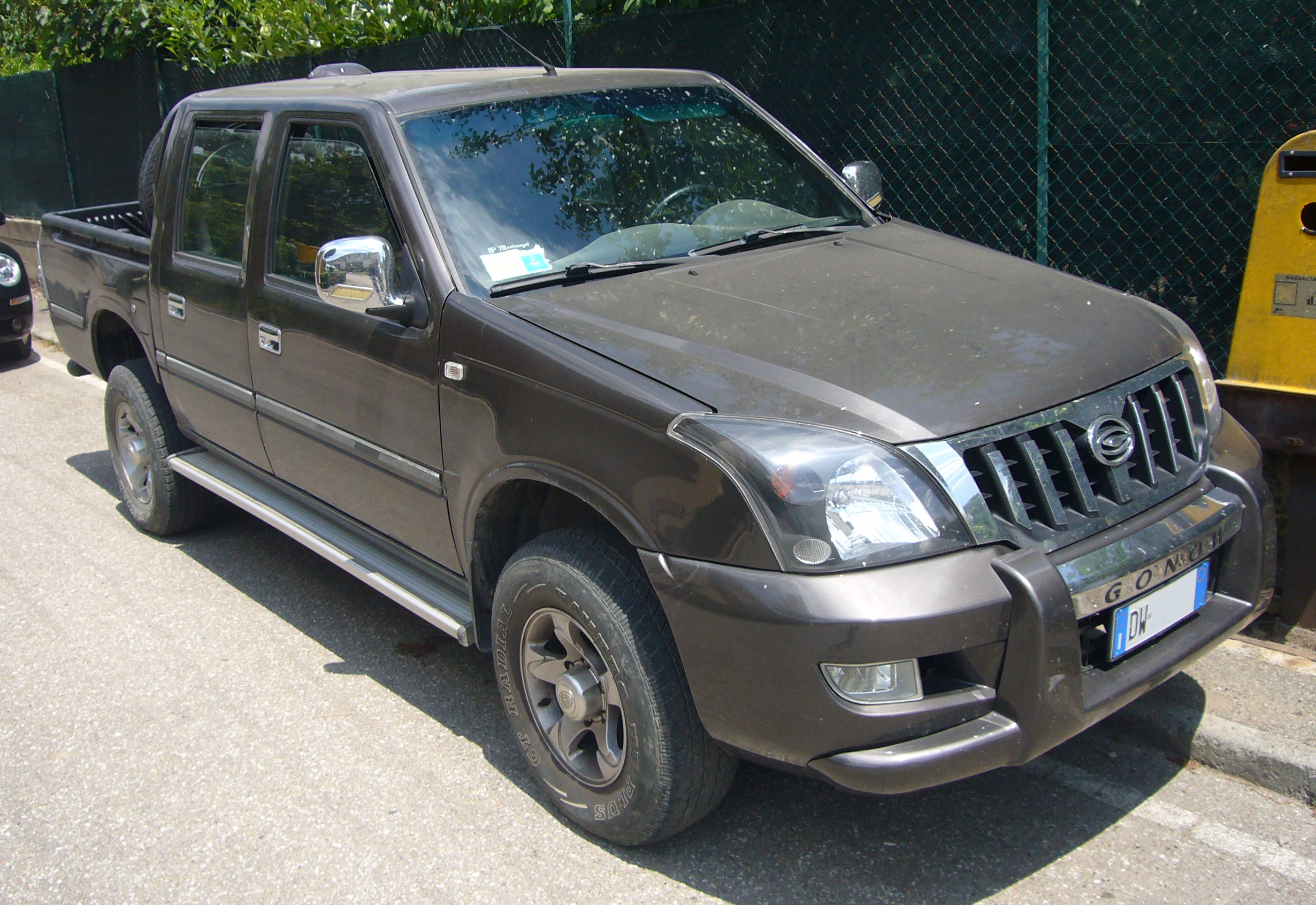
Gonow GA200 (Troy) front quarter

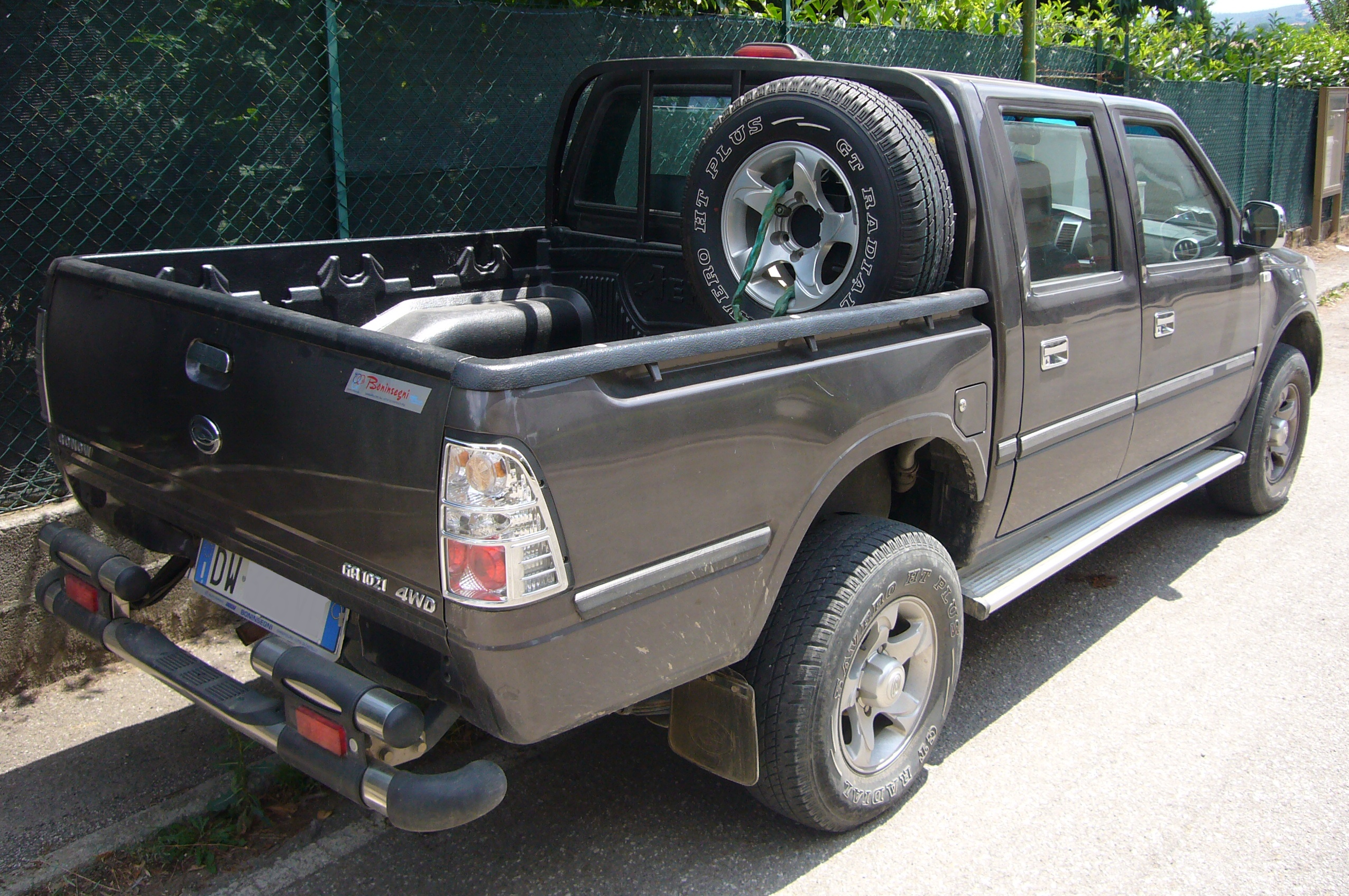
Gonow GA200 (Troy) rear quarter

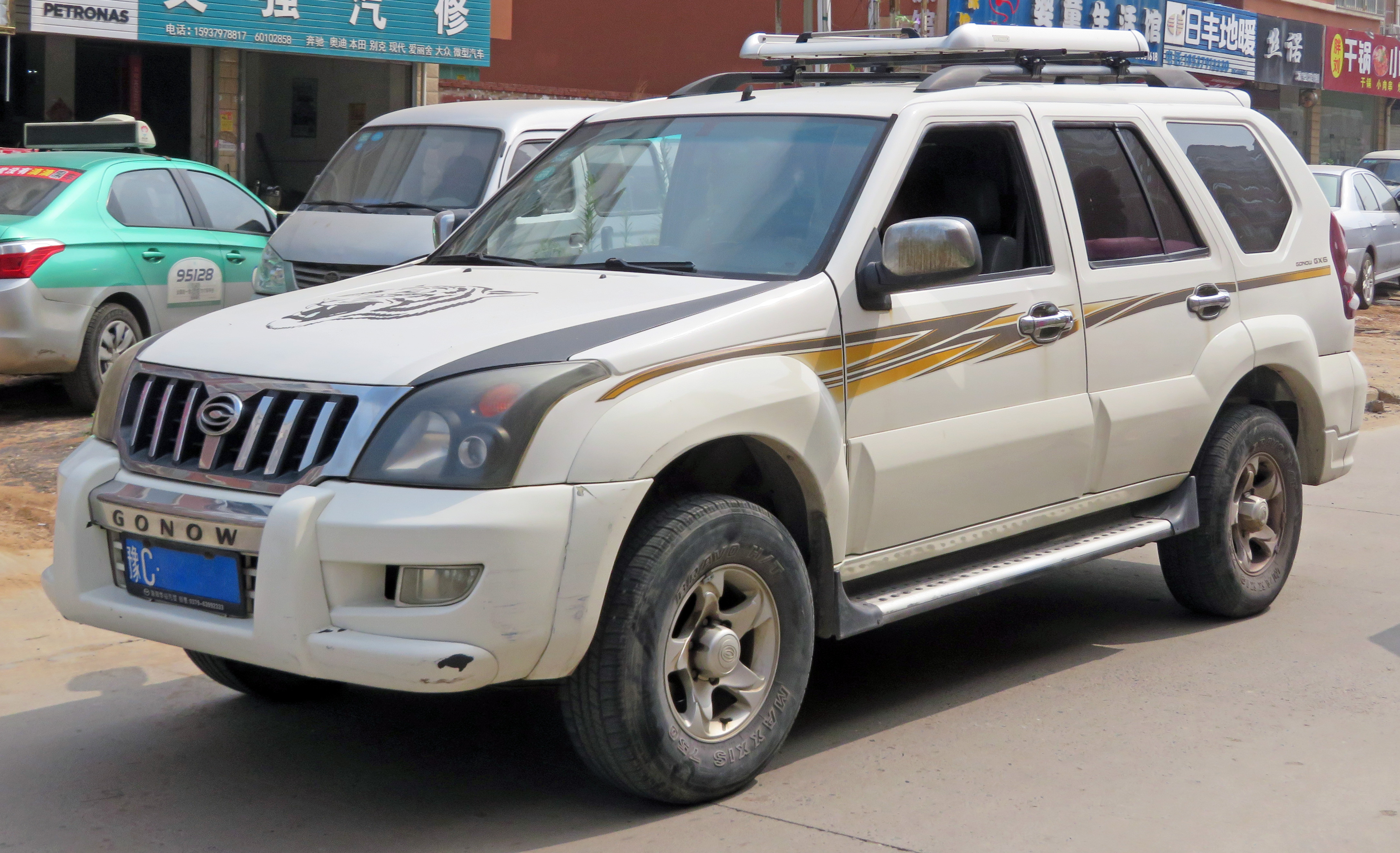
Gonow Kairui

The Gonow Victor (凯睿-Kairui) and Gonow Victory (凯旋-Kaixuan) are both mid-size SUV that shares the same platform as the Huanghai Challenger. Manufactured by Gonow from 2005 to 2009, the SUVs also spawned pickups called the Gonow Troy 100 (GA100-财运100) and Gonow Troy 200 (GA200-财运200) that shares the same exterior styling. The Troy 100 was priced from 52,900 yuan to 59,800 yuan.

== Gonow Jetstar SUV and Gonow Troy 300 ==
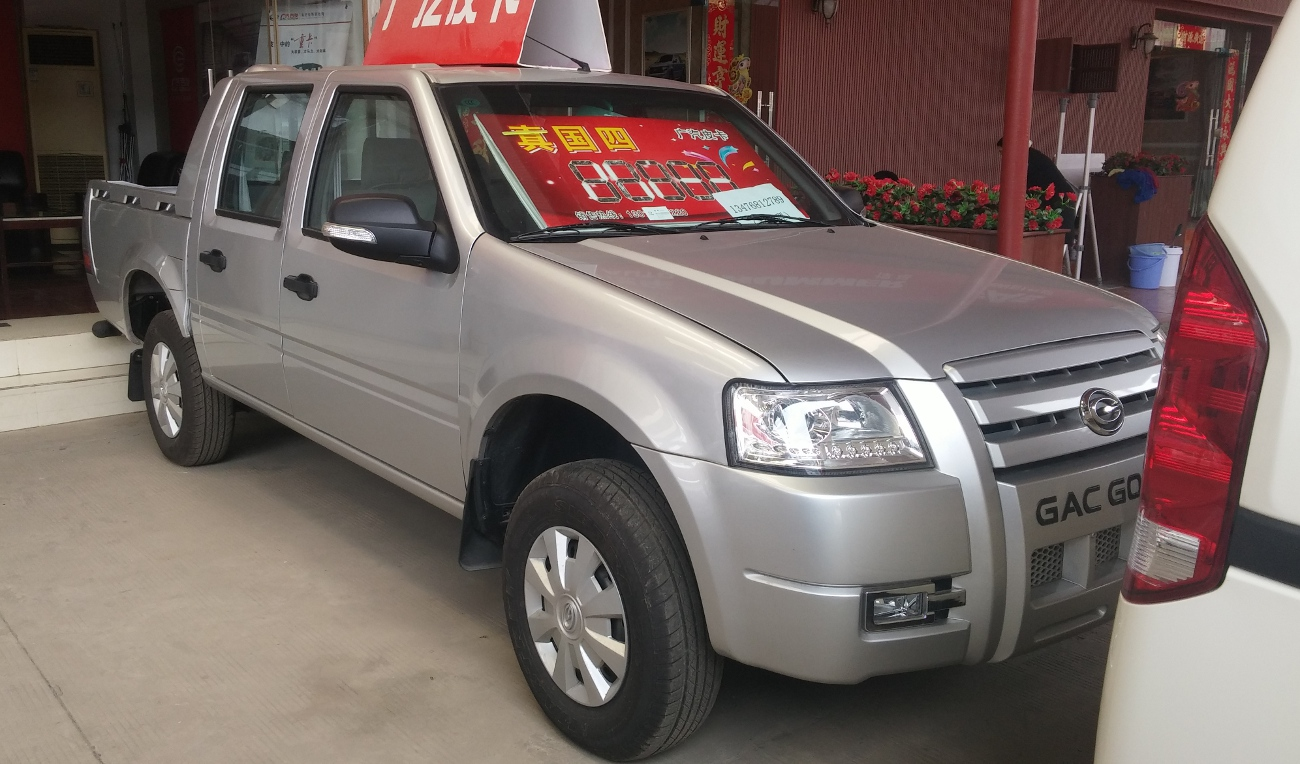
Gonow Troy 300 in China

The Gonow Jetstar SUV (帅舰-Shuaijian) was a mid-size SUV that shares the same platform as the Huanghai Challenger. The Gonow Jetstar was manufactured by Gonow from 2007 to 2009 with a price of 79,800 yuan.

The facelift versions of the Jetstar SUV were called the Gonow Shuaiwei (帅威) and Gonow Shuaichi (帅驰). Both models ceased production in 2008.

The Gonow Troy 300 (财运300) was a mid-size pickup truck that is essentially the pickup version of the Gonow Jetstar SUV which shares the same platform as the Huanghai Challenger.
