= Gonow GX6 =

Chinese crossover SUV

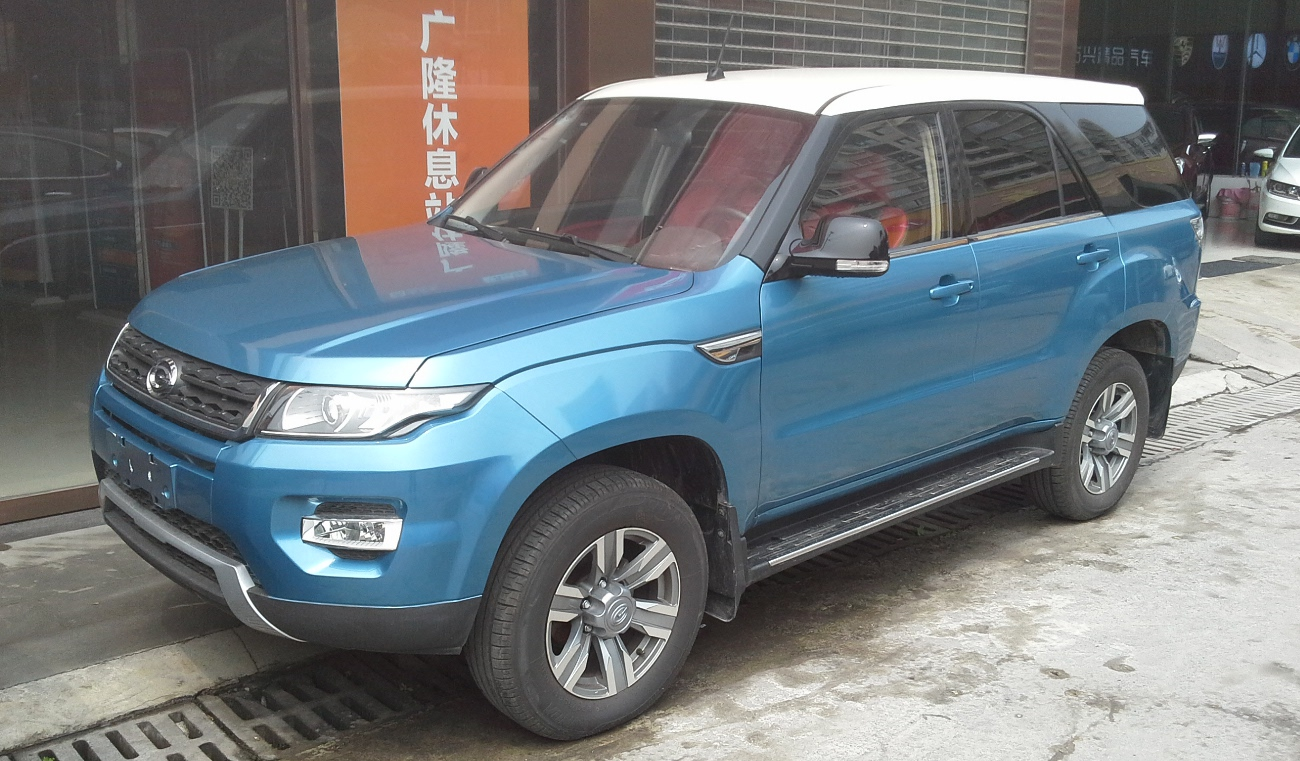

Overview
- Also called: Aoosed GX6
- Production: 2014–2016

Body and chassis
- Layout: Front-engine, four-wheel-drive
- Related: Gonow Aoosed GX5

Powertrain
- Engine: Mitsubishi 4G69S4N 2.4L inline-4
- Transmission: 5-speed manual transmission

Dimensions
- Wheelbase: 2,745 mm (108.1 in)
- Length: 4,640 mm (182.7 in)
- Width: 1,815 mm (71.5 in)
- Height: 1,800 mm (70.9 in)

The Gonow GX6 is a mid-size crossover SUV (mid-size SUV produced from 2014 to 2016 by the Chinese manufacturer Guangzhou Automobile under the Gonow brand. It was based on the lower market Gonow Aoosed GX5.

== Overview ==
The Gonow GX6 (second generation) was previewed by the Gonow GA6470 Concept that debuted on the 2014 Beijing Auto Show in April 2014. The production version is powered by a Mistsubishi-sourced 2.4-liter engine mated to a 5-speed manual gearbox. The price of the Aoosed G5 ranges from 86,800 yuan to 148,800 yuan.

The design of it is controversial as the front fascia heavily resembles the Land Rover Evoque and was referred to as a poor impersonation of Range Rover. The rest of the design was based on the structures of the Gonow Aoosed GX5 while featuring an optional two tone paint job. The price of the GX6 ranges from 109,800 yuan (US$17,900) to 146,800 yuan ($26,053). The side profile also appears to be very similar to the Toyota Fortuner AN50.

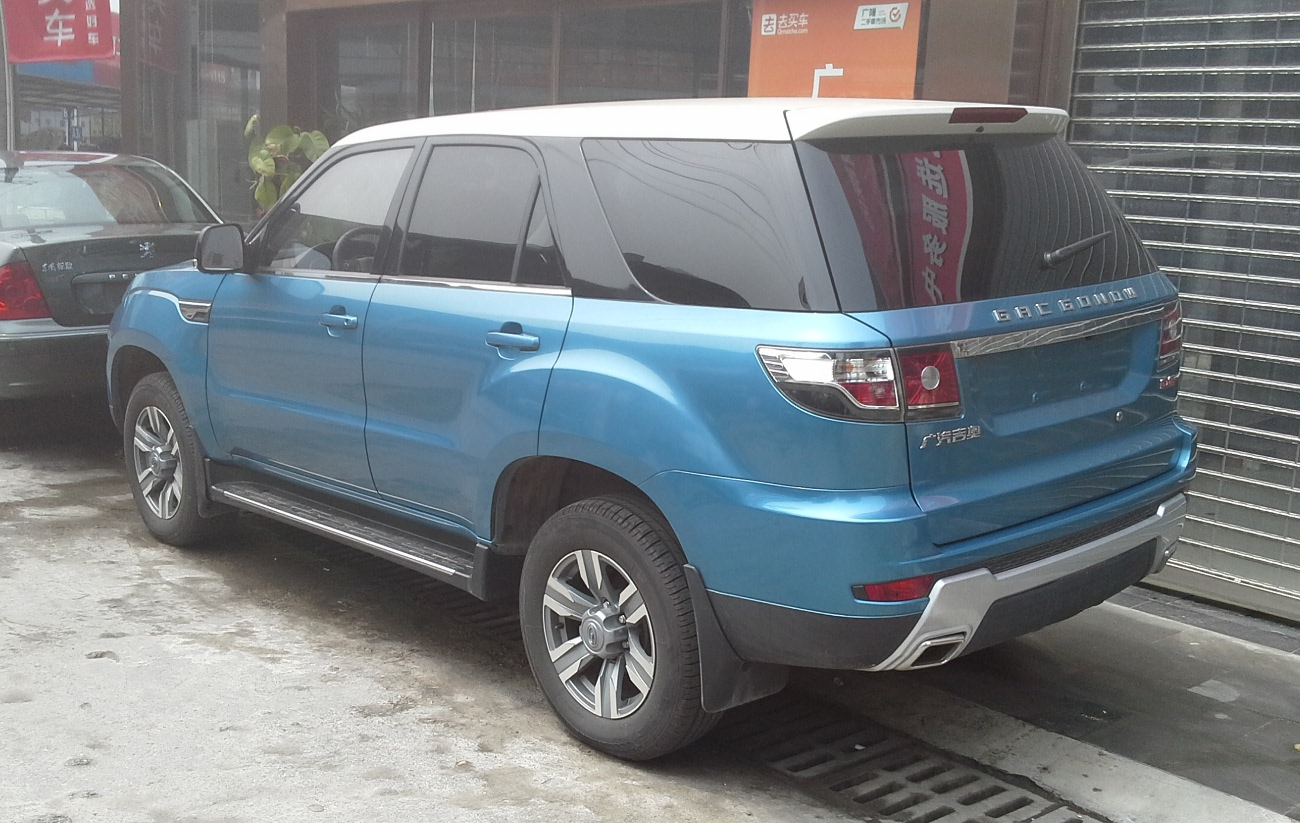
Gonow GX6
