= Trumpchi GA4 =

Chinese compact sedan

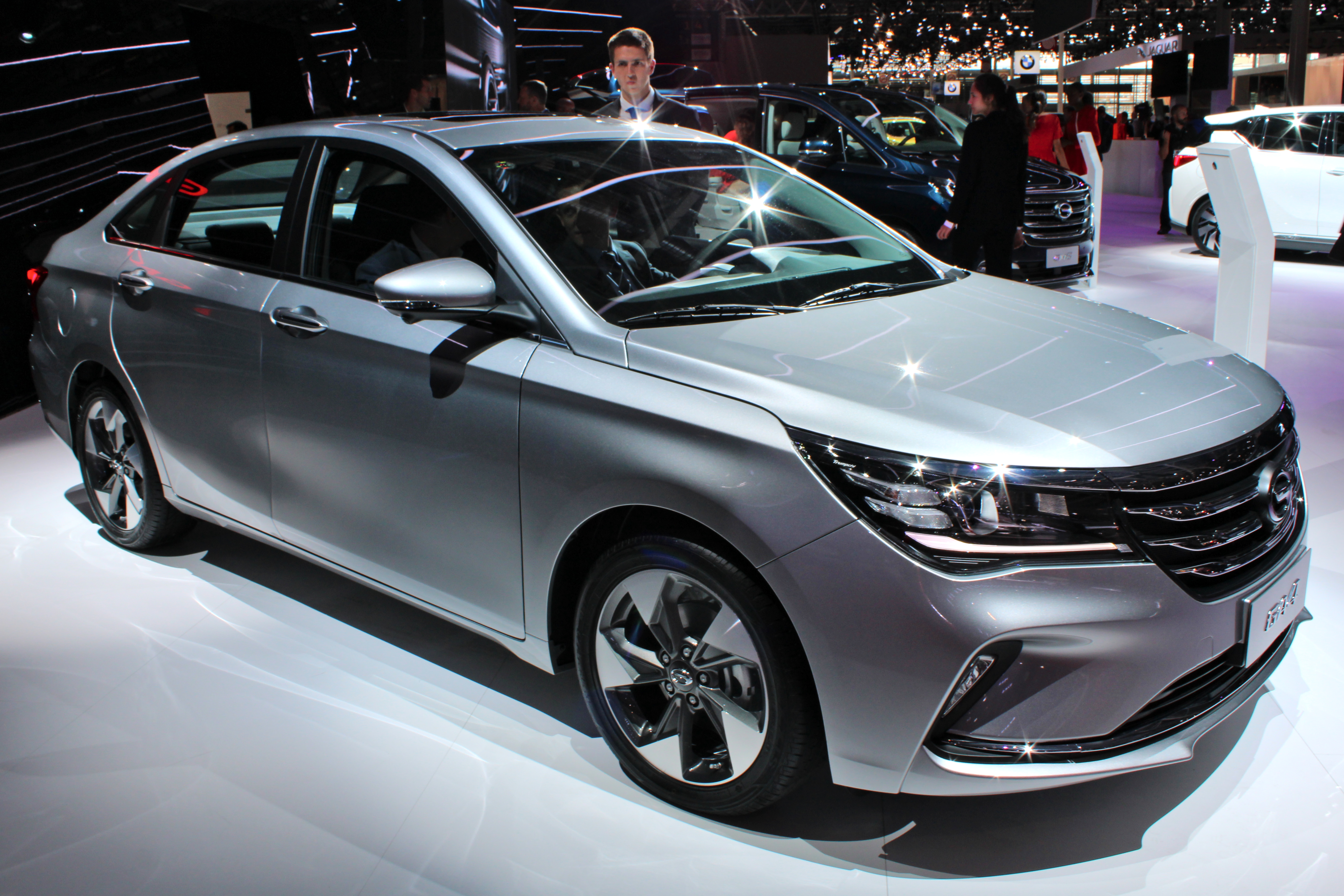
- Trumpchi GA4

Overview
- Manufacturer: GAC Group
- Also called: GAC GA4
- Production: 2018–2023
- Model years: 2018–2023

Body and chassis
- Class: Compact car (C)
- Body style: 4-door sedan
- Layout: Front-engine, front-wheel-drive

Powertrain
- Engine: Petrol: 1.3 L 4A13M1 turbo I4; 1.5 L 4A15K1 I4
- Power output: 102 kW (137 hp; 139 PS) (4A13M1); 85 kW (114 hp; 116 PS) (4A15K1)
- Transmission: 5-speed manual; 4-speed automatic; 6-speed automatic

Dimensions
- Wheelbase: 2,660 mm (104.7 in)
- Length: 4,692 mm (184.7 in)
- Width: 1,805 mm (71.1 in)
- Height: 1,500 mm (59.1 in)
- Curb weight: 1,265–1,330 kg (2,789–2,932 lb)

Chronology
- Predecessor: Trumpchi GA5
- Successor: Trumpchi Empow

The Trumpchi GA4 is a compact sedan produced by GAC Group under the Trumpchi brand in China and the GAC Motor brand globally. It was intended to be a smaller successor to the GA5 compact sedan, leaving the GA5 nameplate open for a new compact sedan model.

== Overview ==
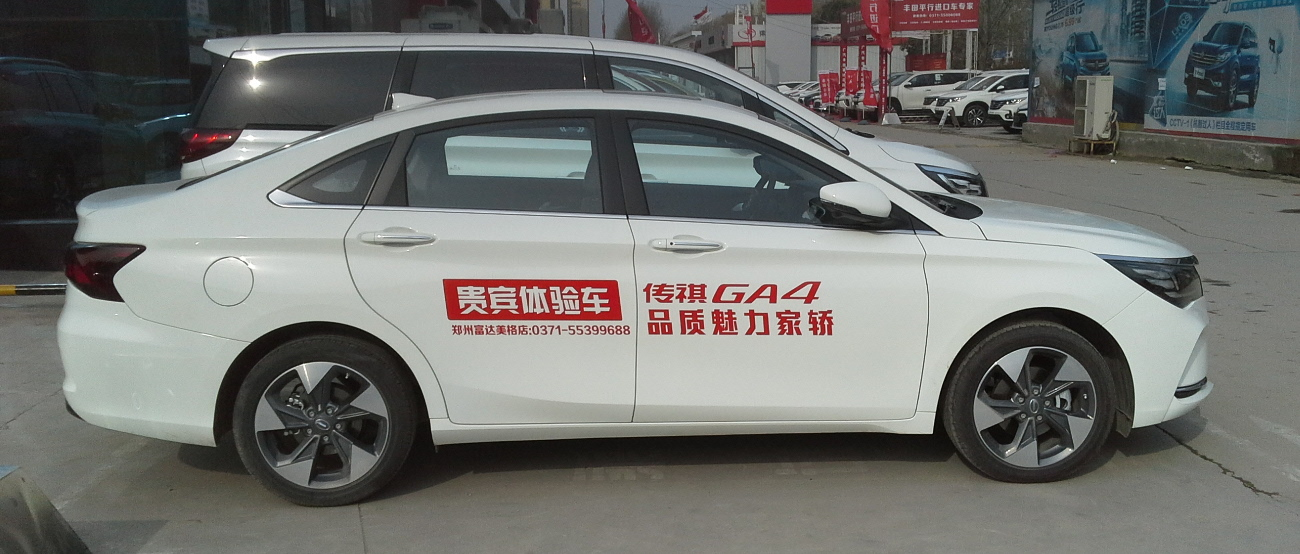
Trumpchi GA4 side profile

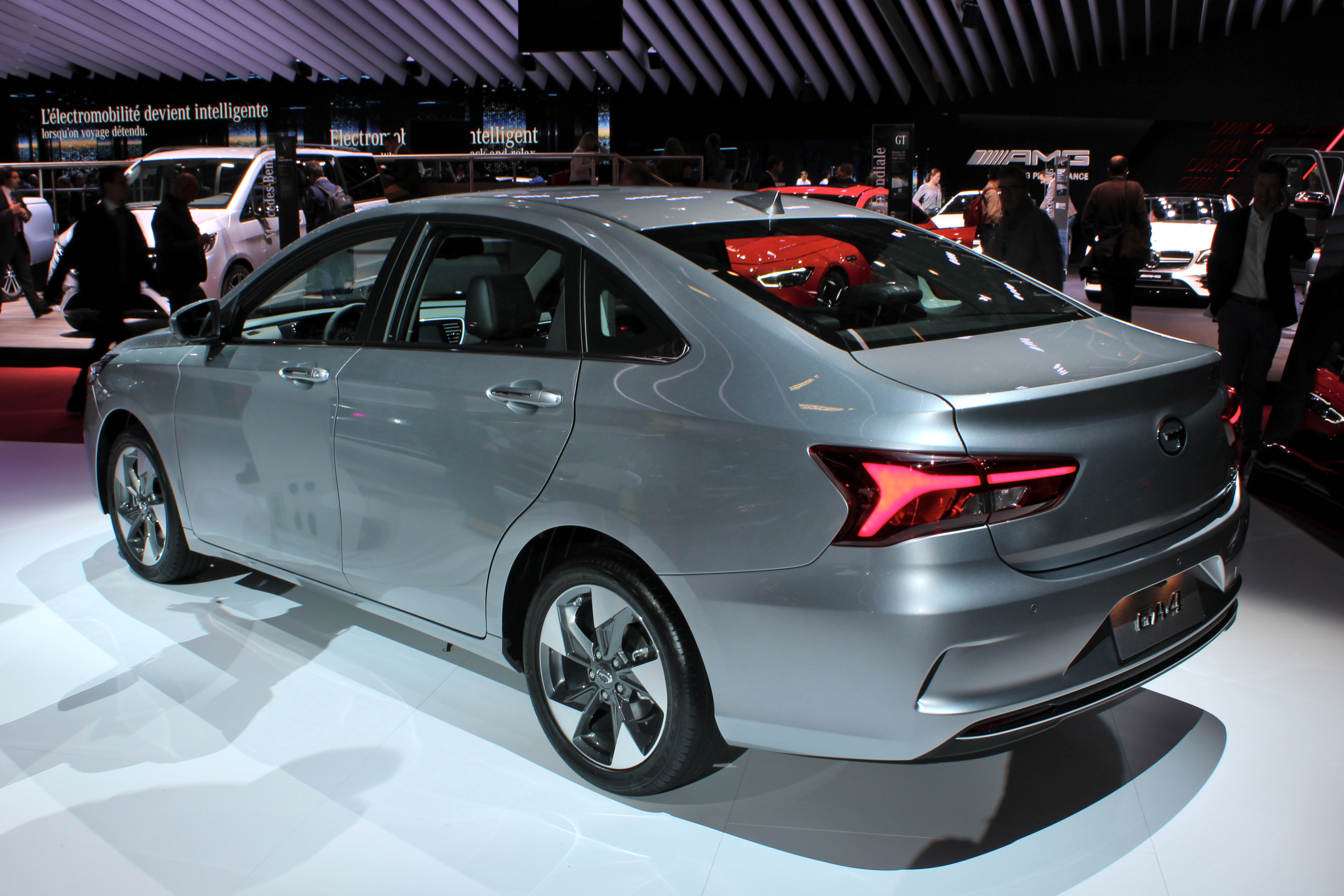
Trumpchi GA4 rear

The Trumpchi GA4 was officially launched during the 2018 North American International Auto Show in Detroit as the replacement for the Trumpchi GA5 compact sedan in China, and it went on sale in China shortly after on January 18, 2018. Sales in North America was planned to start in 2019.

The GA4 sedan is powered by either a 1.5-liter I4 with 114hp mated to a 5-speed manual or a 4-speed automatic transmission, or a 1.3-liter turbo I4 engine generating 137hp and 202Nm of torque, mated to a 5-speed manual or a 6-speed automatic transmission. Prices ranges from 73,800 Yuan (€ 9,400/ US$11,600) to 115,800 Yuan (€ 14,800/ US$18,300).

== Motorsport ==
On June 12, 2019, a GAC GA4 topped the Manufacturer Class of both four-hour and 12-hour segments of the Kalayaan Cup Endurance Challenge at Clark International Speedway in the Philippines. In GAC Motor's debut at the endurance race, the car finished second overall in the first four hours, and fourth overall in the entire 12-hour race.

== Sales ==
Year	China
2023	5
2024	2

== See also ==
- List of GAC vehicles
