= Dodge Attitude =

Series of rebadged subcompact and compact sedans for the Mexican market

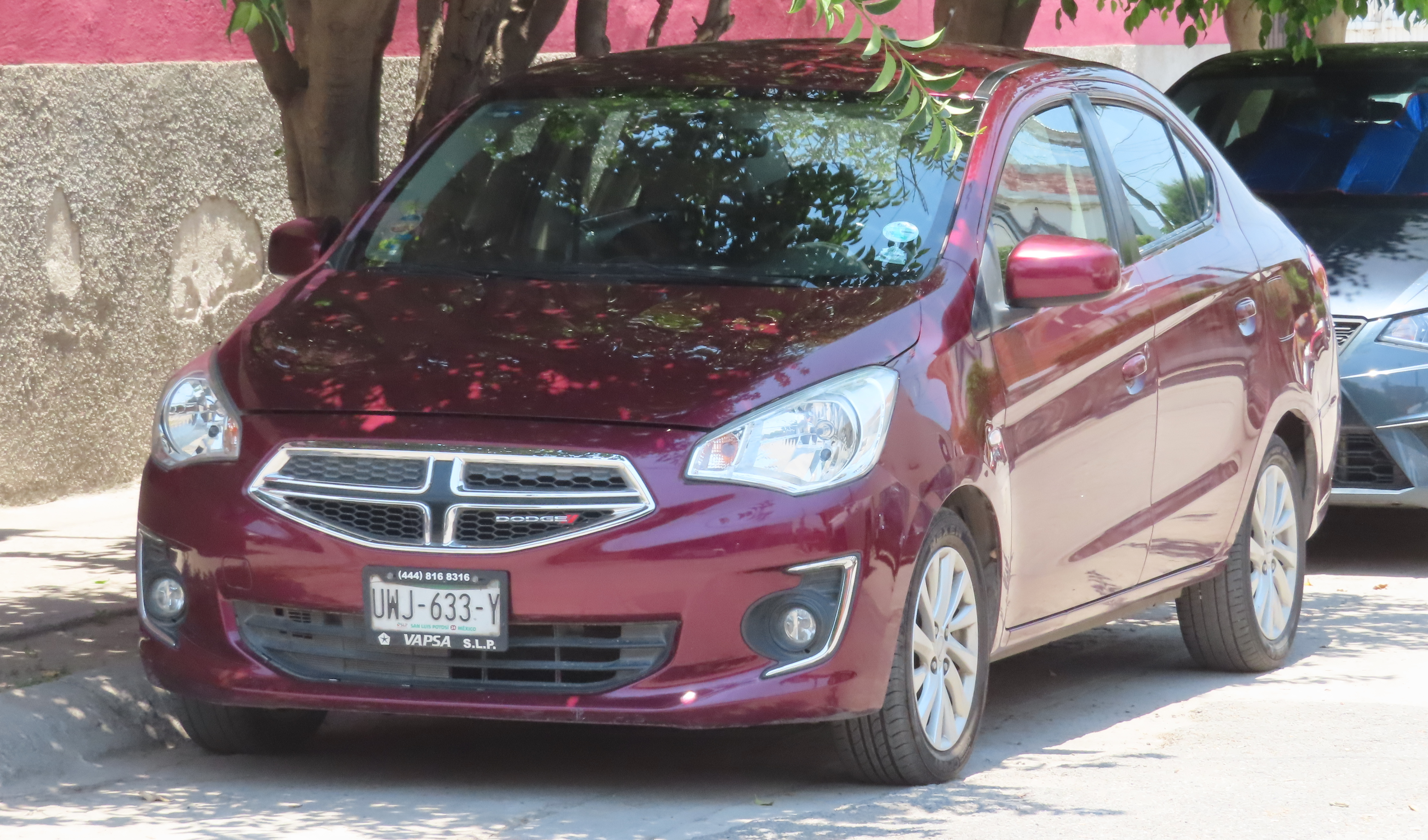
- Third generation

Overview
- Manufacturer: Chrysler Mexico
- Production: 2006–present

Chronology
- Predecessor: Dodge Verna

The Dodge Attitude is a badge-engineered subcompact and compact sedan sold by Stellantis North America (previously Fiat Chrysler Automobiles, Chrysler Group LLC, and Dodge Chrysler LLC) in Mexico over four generations since 2006.

== First generation (MC; 2006) ==
The Attitude was commercialized exclusively in the Mexican market, when the local subsidiary of Chrysler rebadged the Hyundai Accent (MC) for the original version using the "Dodge" brand.

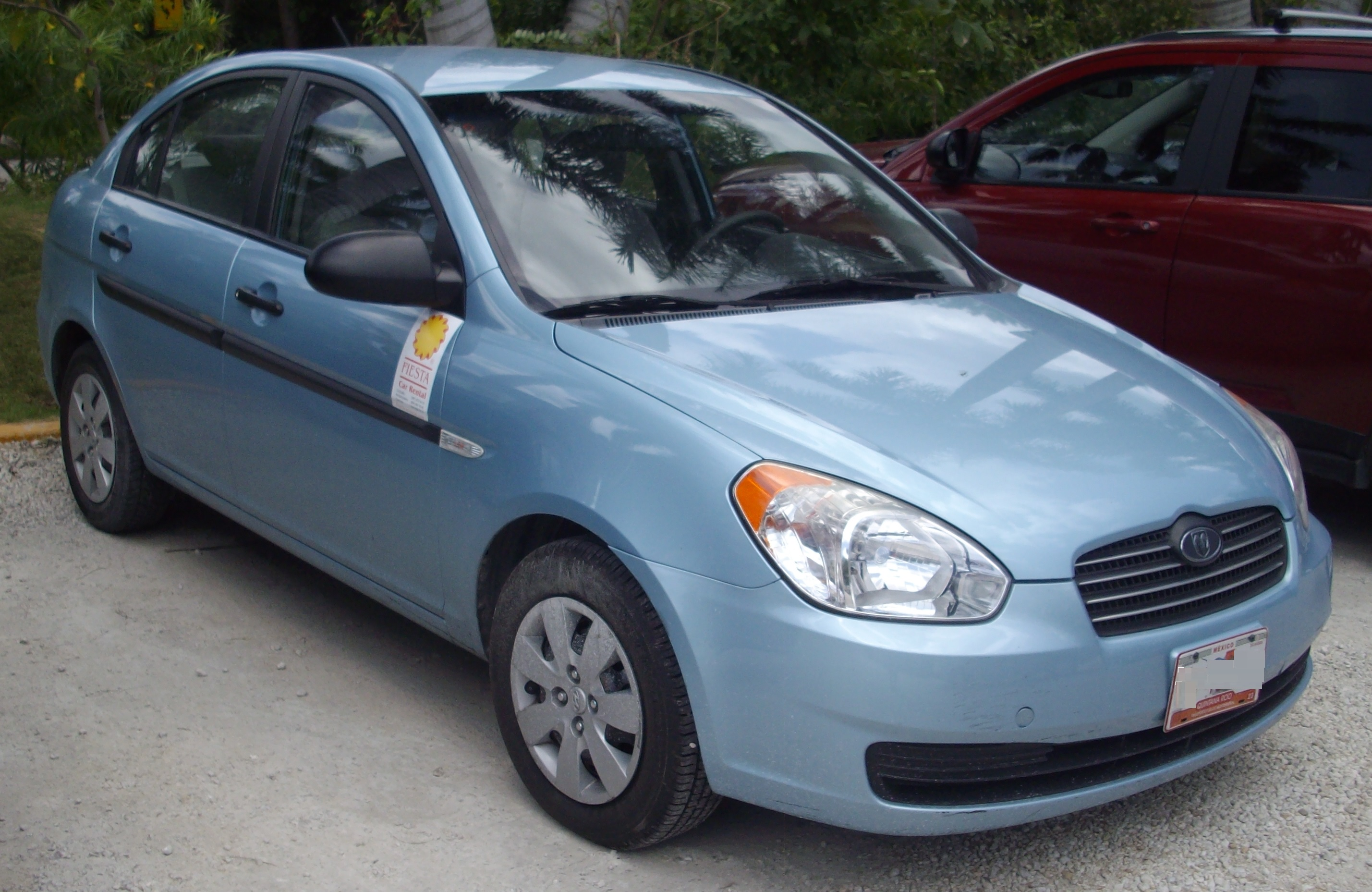

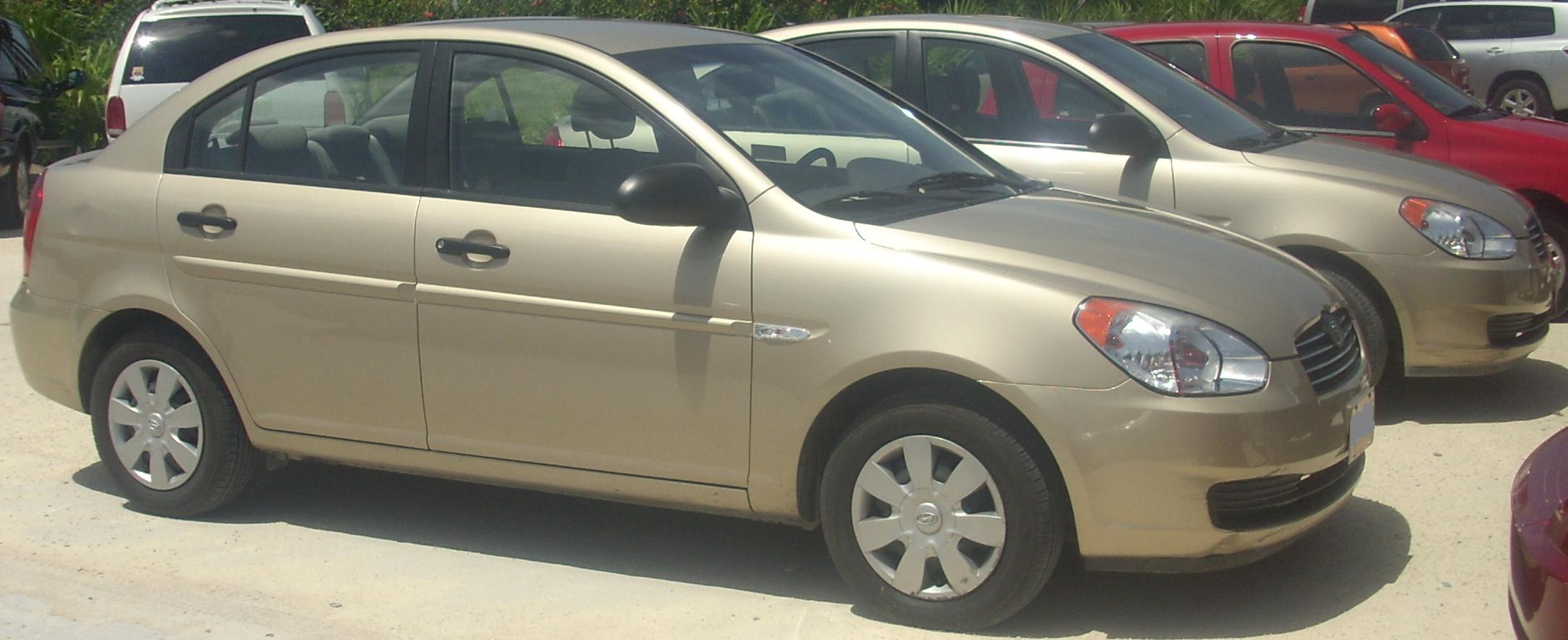

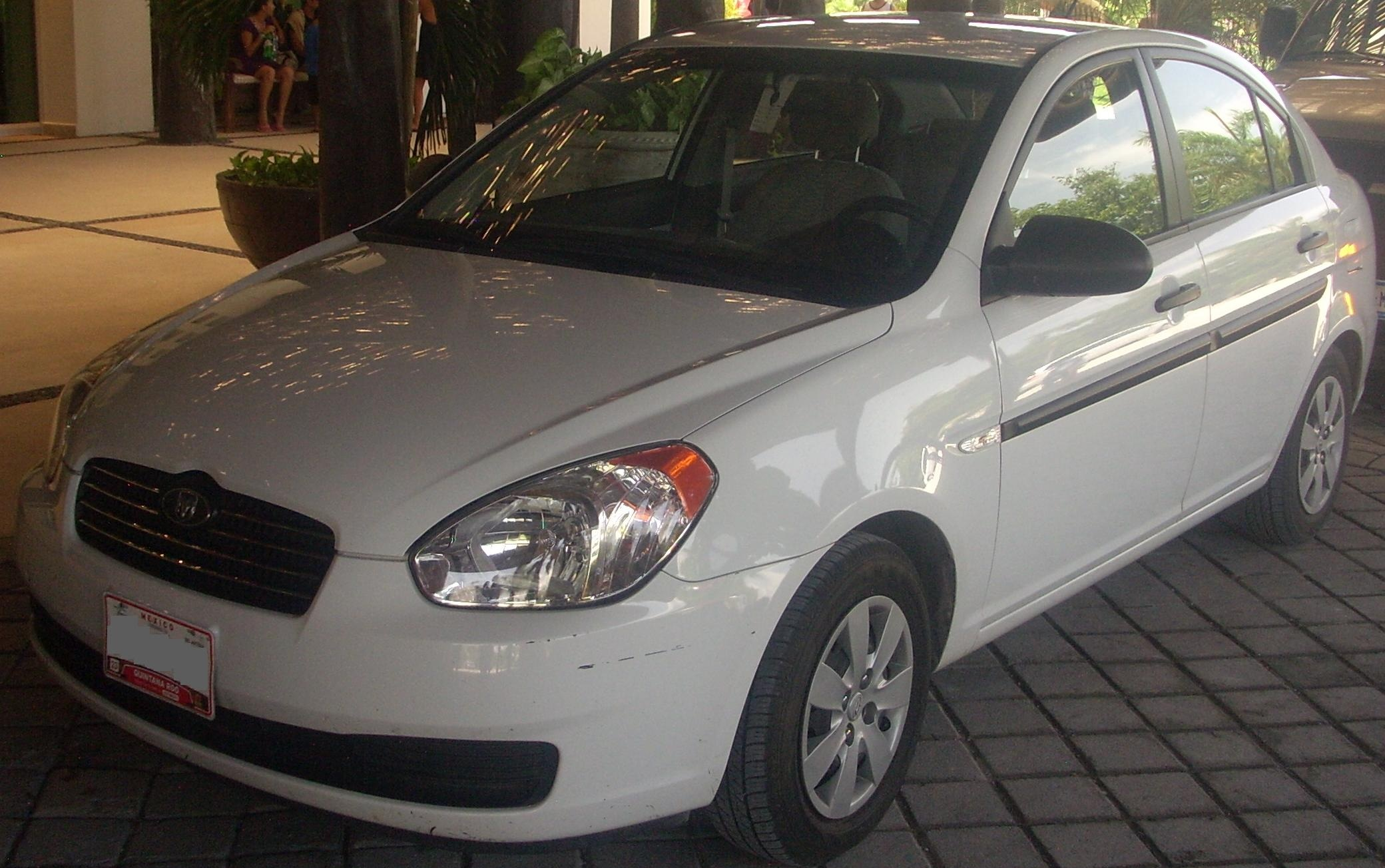

== Second generation (RB; 2011) ==
The model line was updated in 2011 with the Accent RB series. It is nearly identical to the Hyundai Accent and even retains the Hyundai logo on the front and rear, and only has Dodge and Attitude badging on the rear.

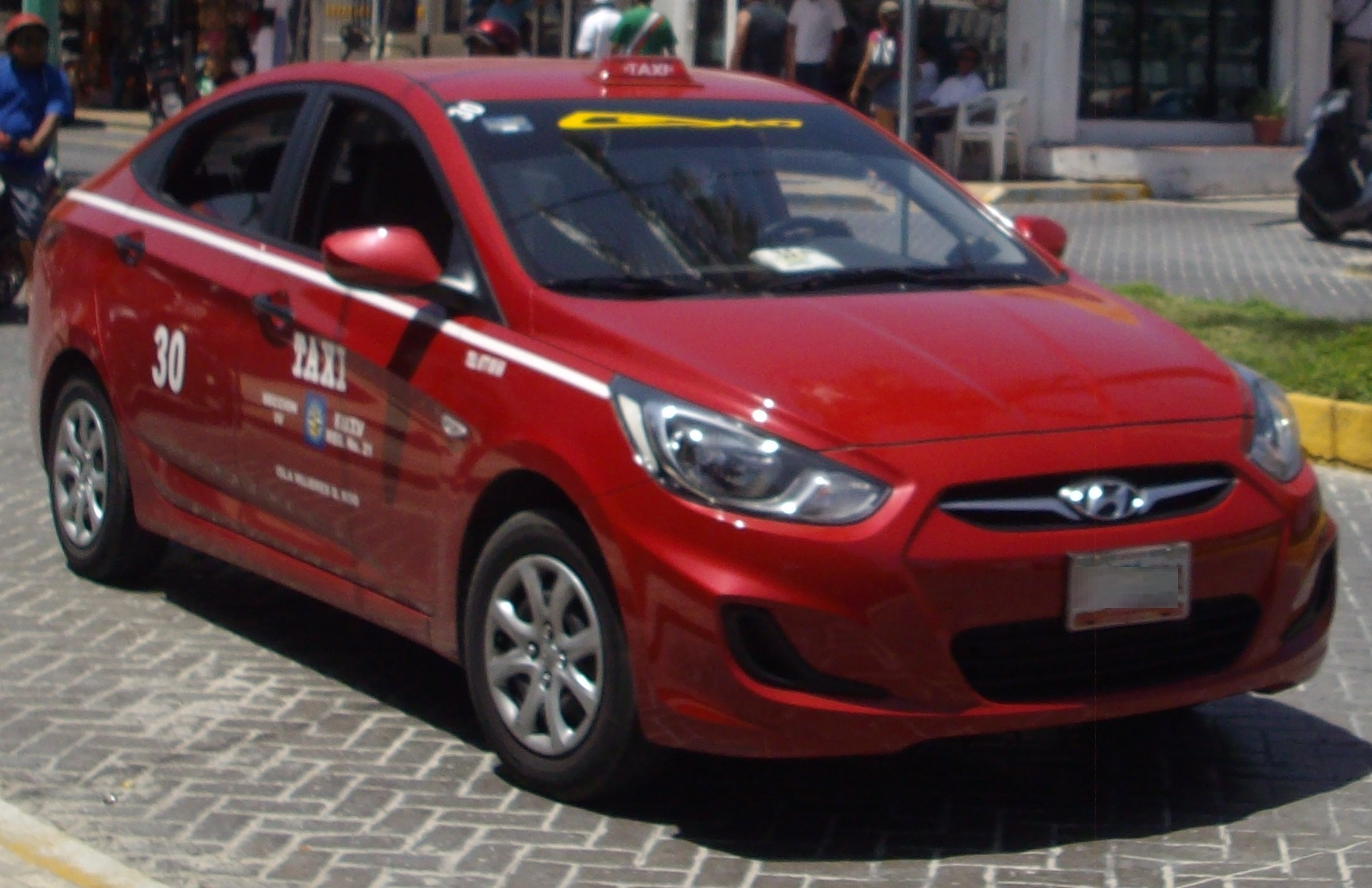
Second generation

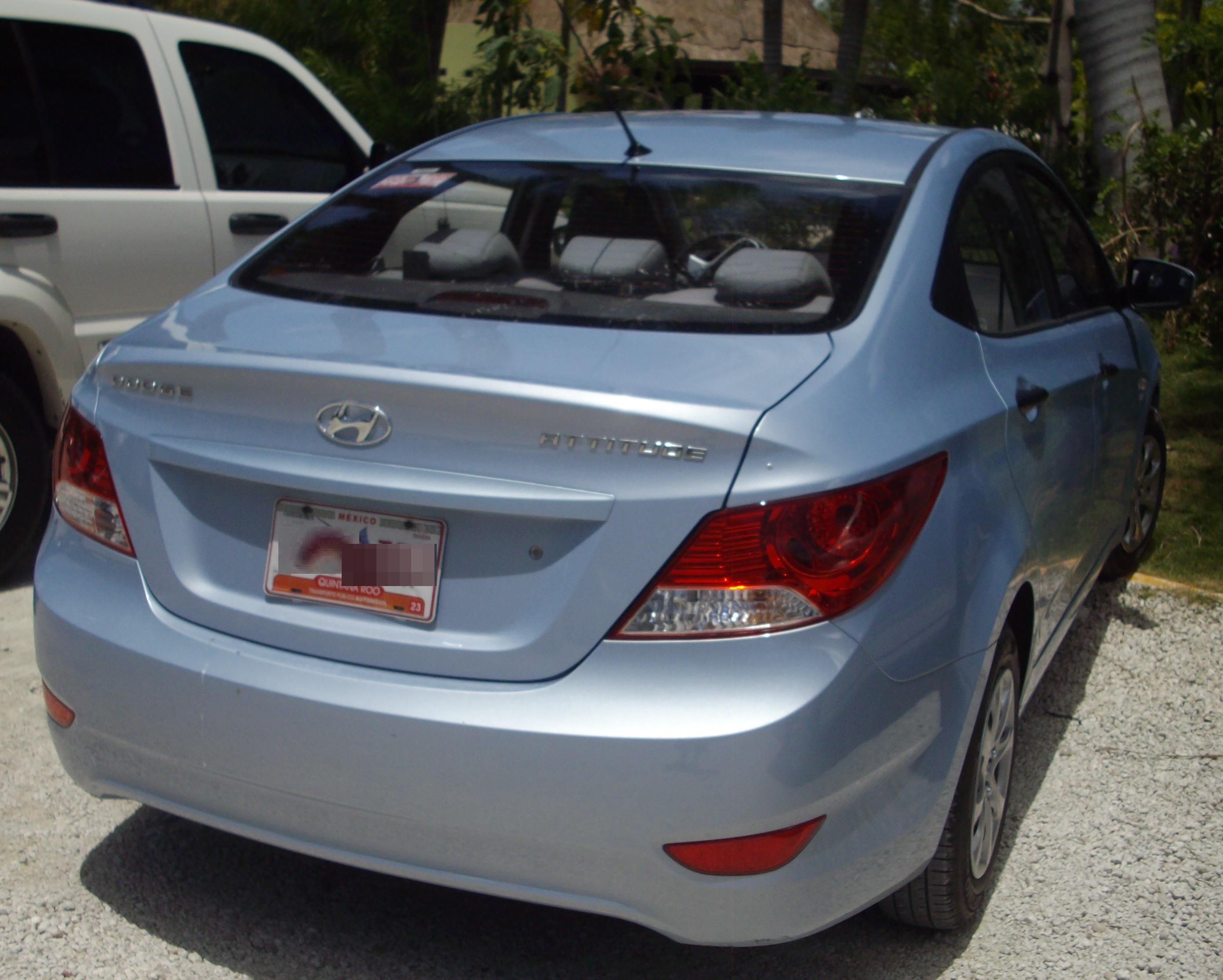

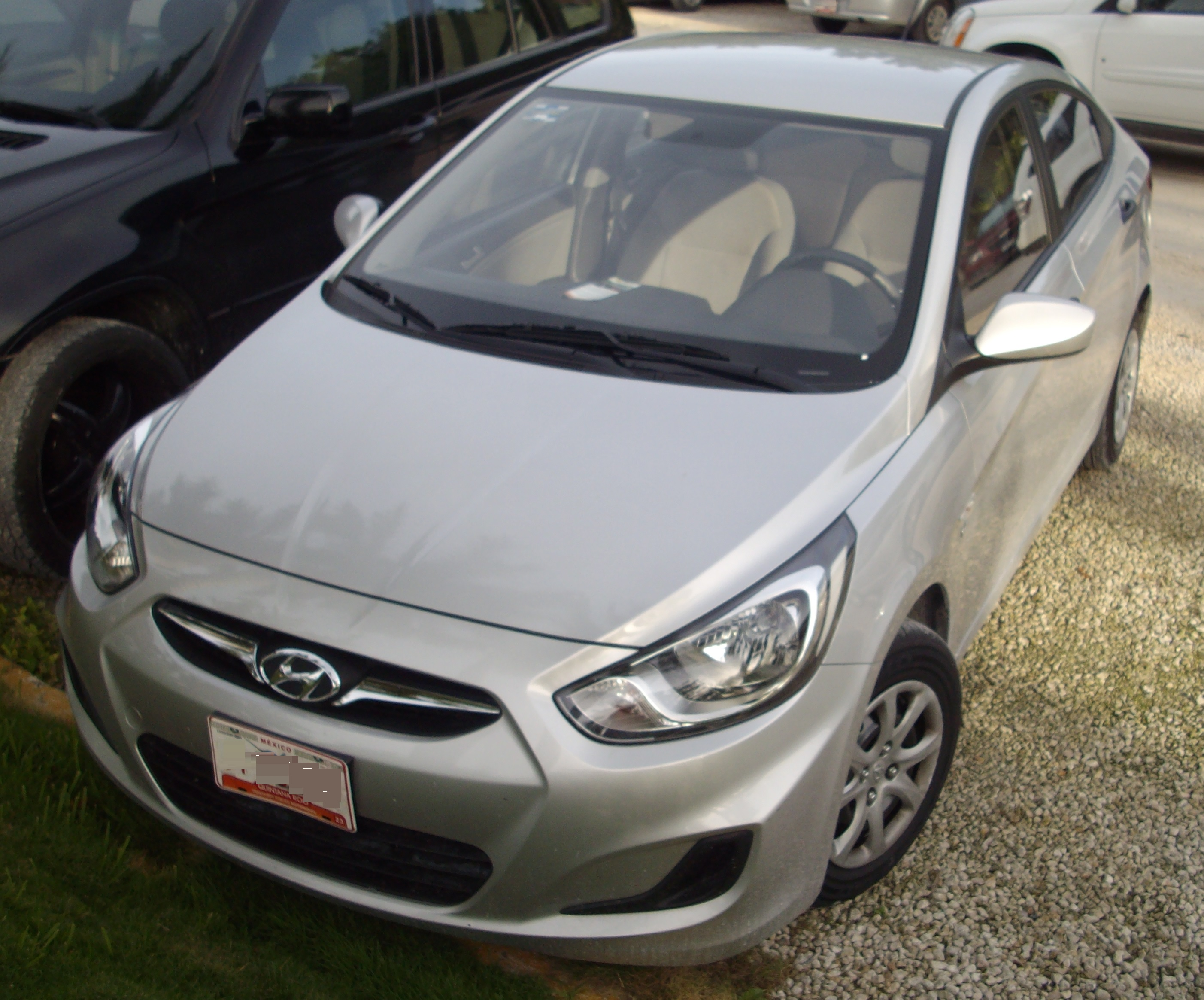

== Third generation (A10; 2015) ==
From January 2015, the Mitsubishi Attrage/Mirage G4 was rebadged as the third generation model of the Attitude. Unlike its previous generation, this Attitude rebadge bears the Dodge logo.

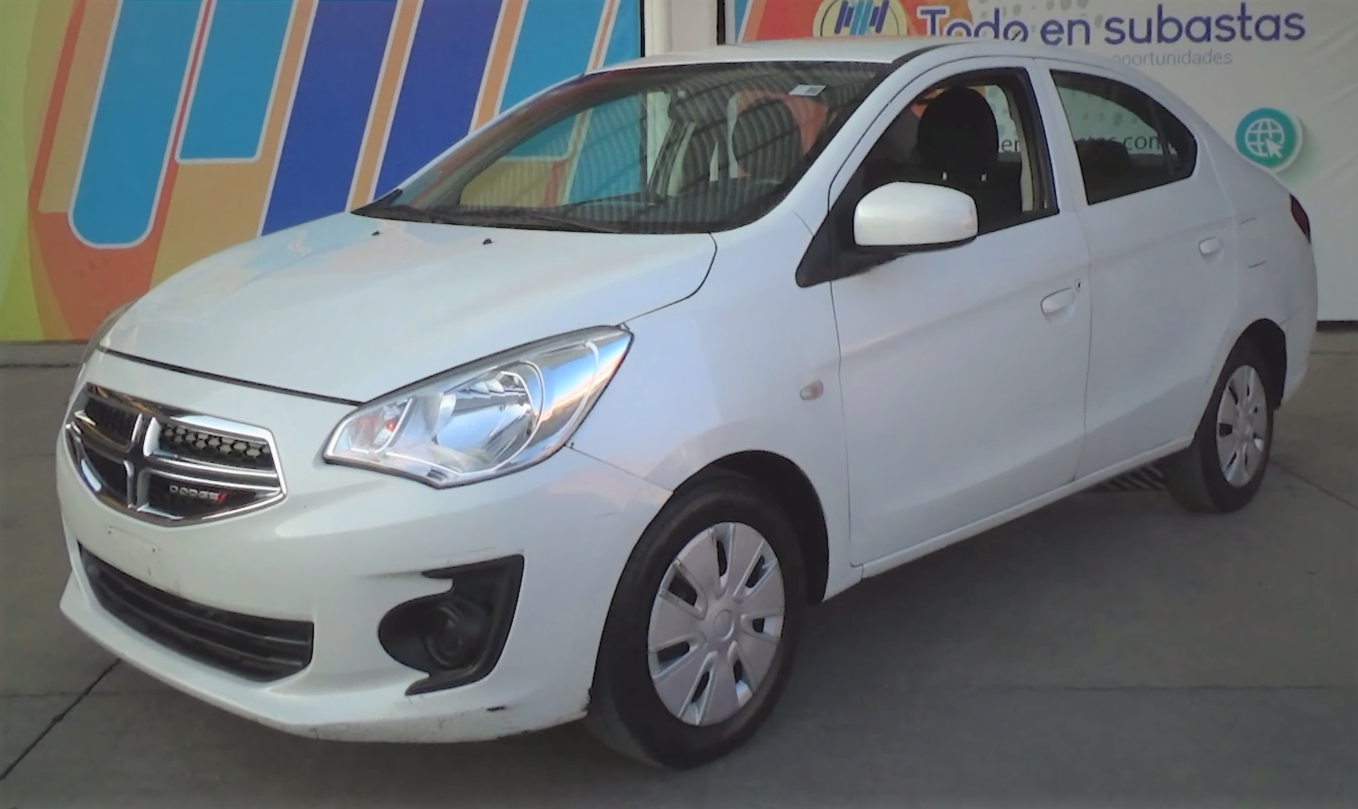

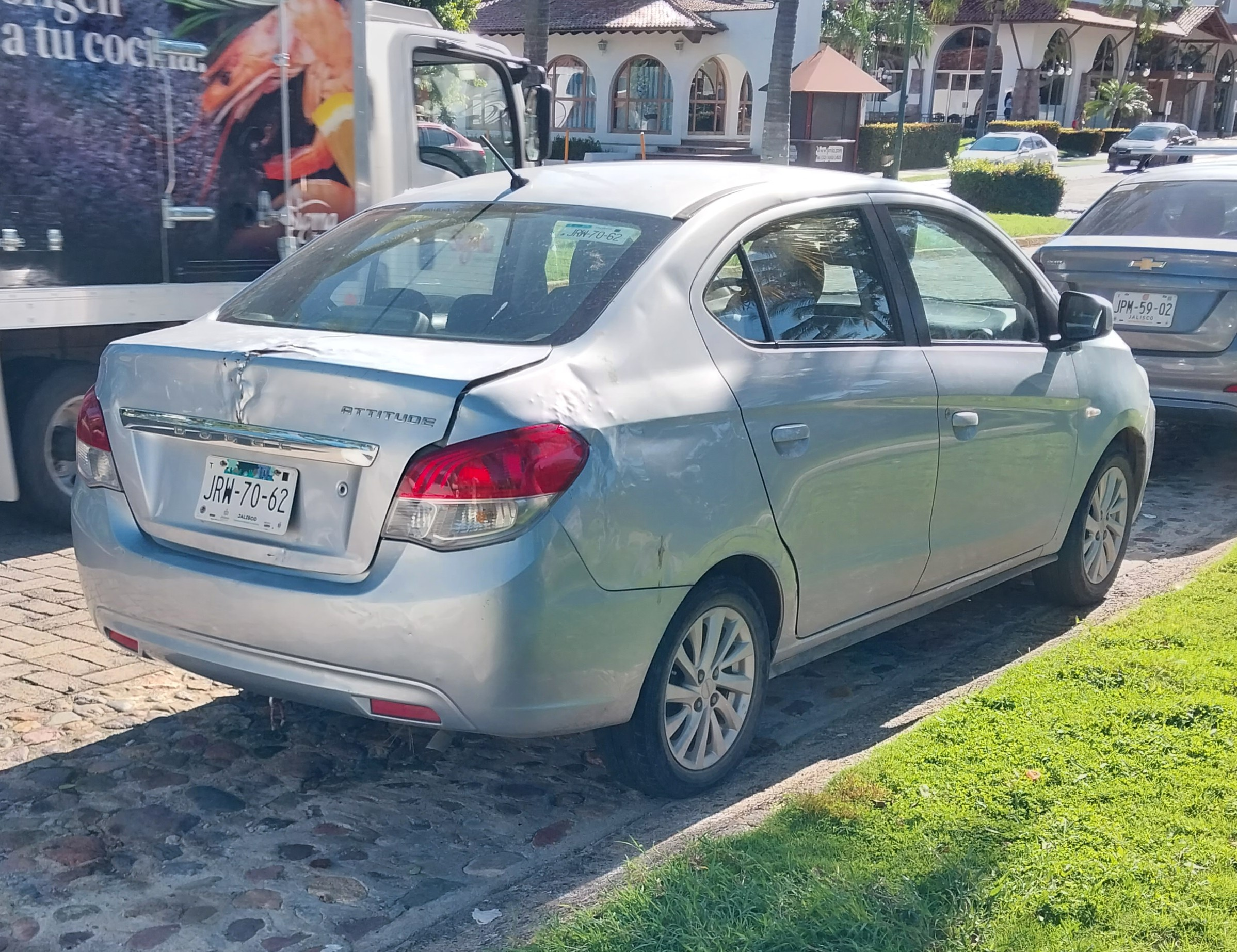

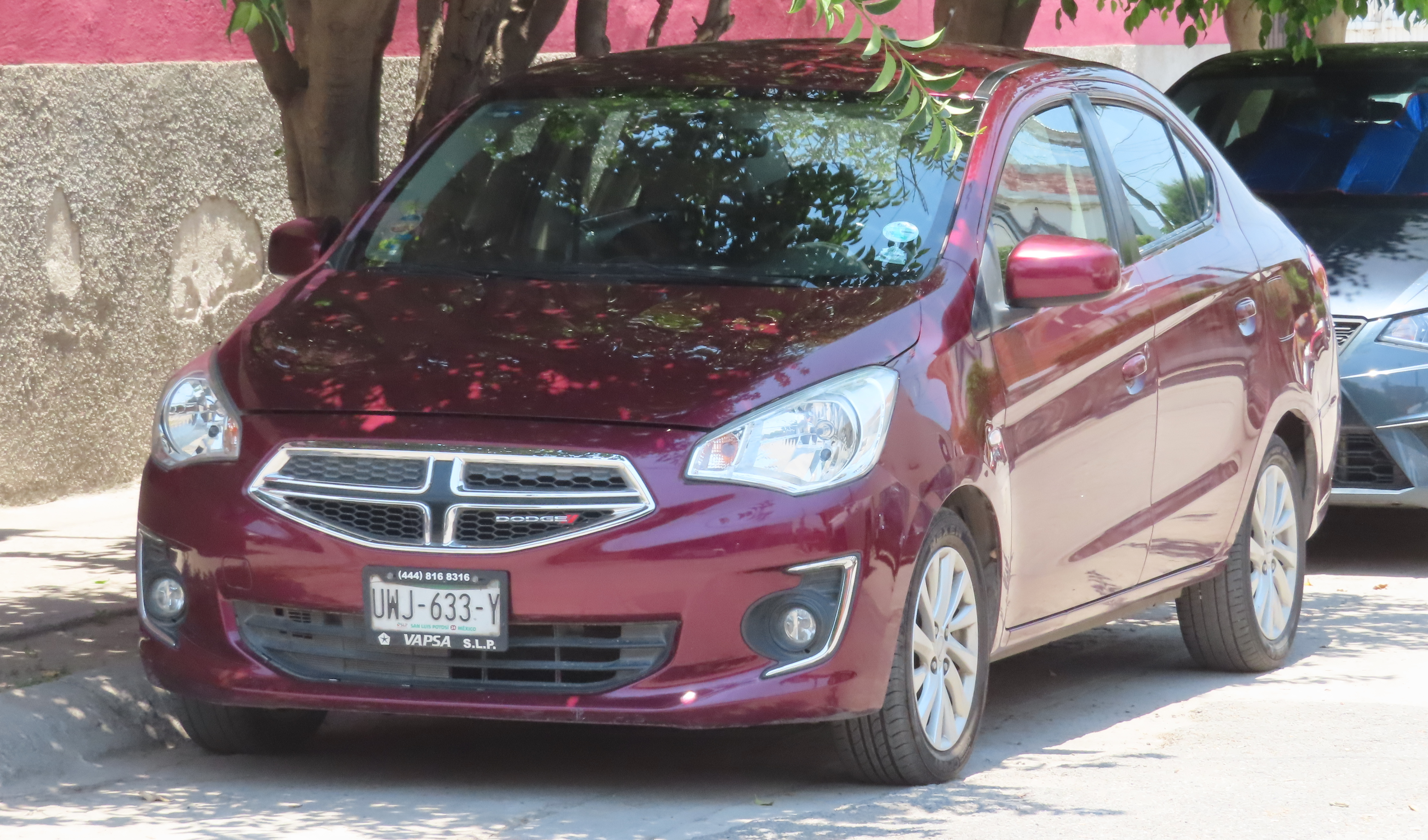

== Fourth generation (2025) ==
In July 2024, news of a fourth generation Dodge Attitude for the Mexican market surfaced. The fourth generation Dodge Attitude would be a compact sedan based on the Trumpchi Empow. Following the Mexican market second generation Dodge Journey, the fourth generation Dodge Attitude is the second GAC Group vehicle to be rebadged as a Dodge for the Mexican market.

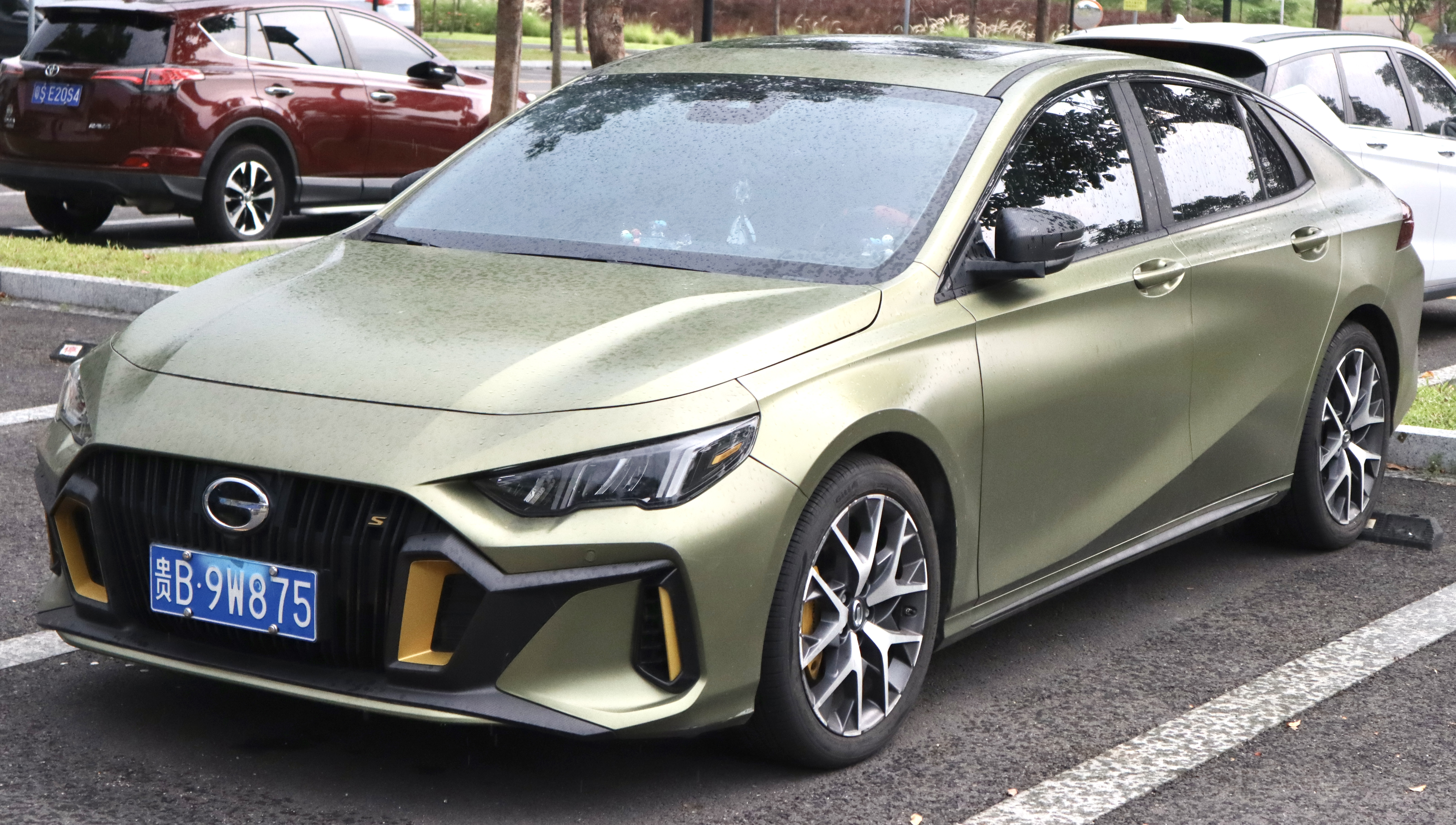
Trumpchi Empow (front)

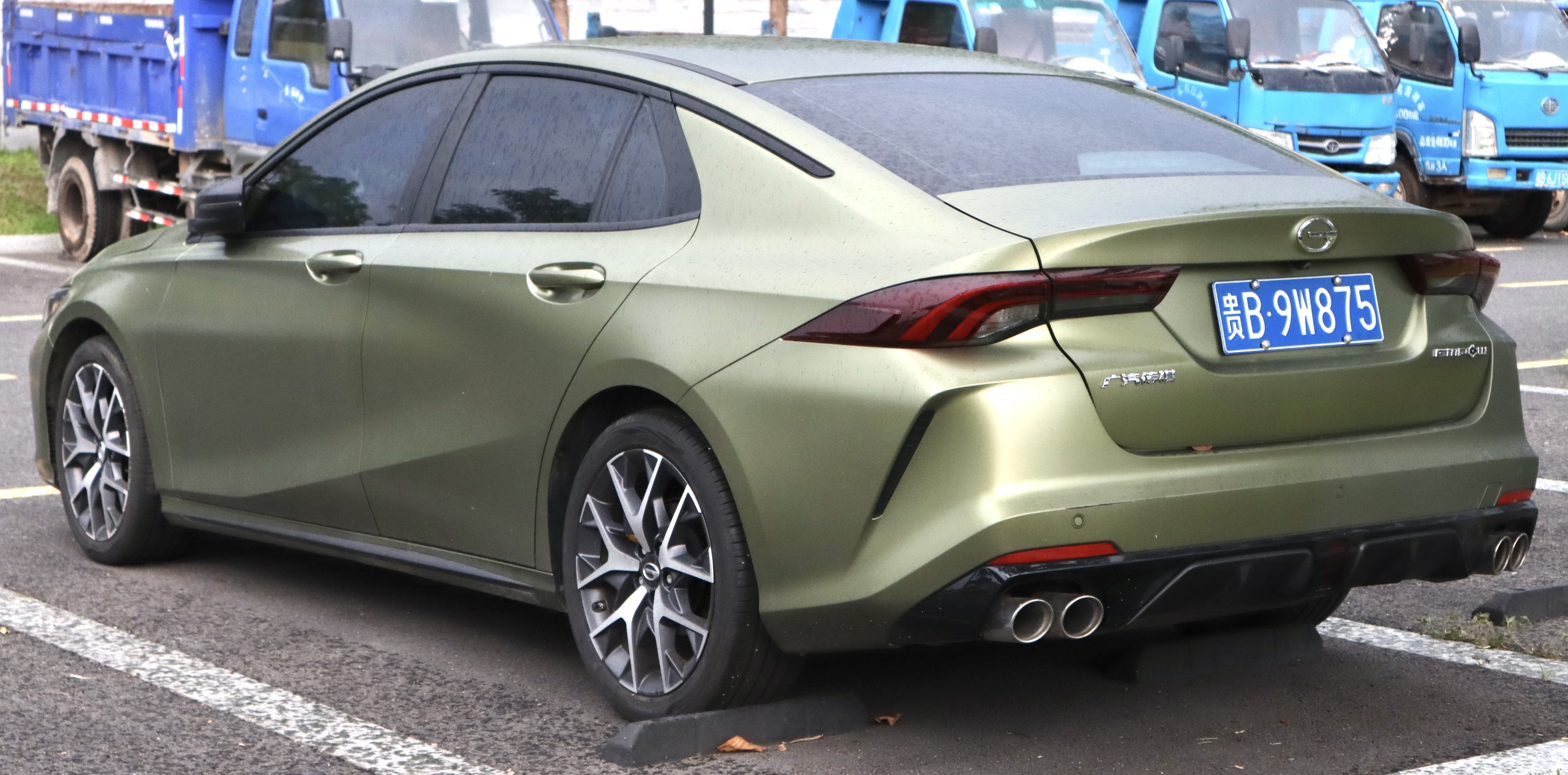
Trumpchi Empow (rear)
