= Trumpchi Empow =

Compact sedan

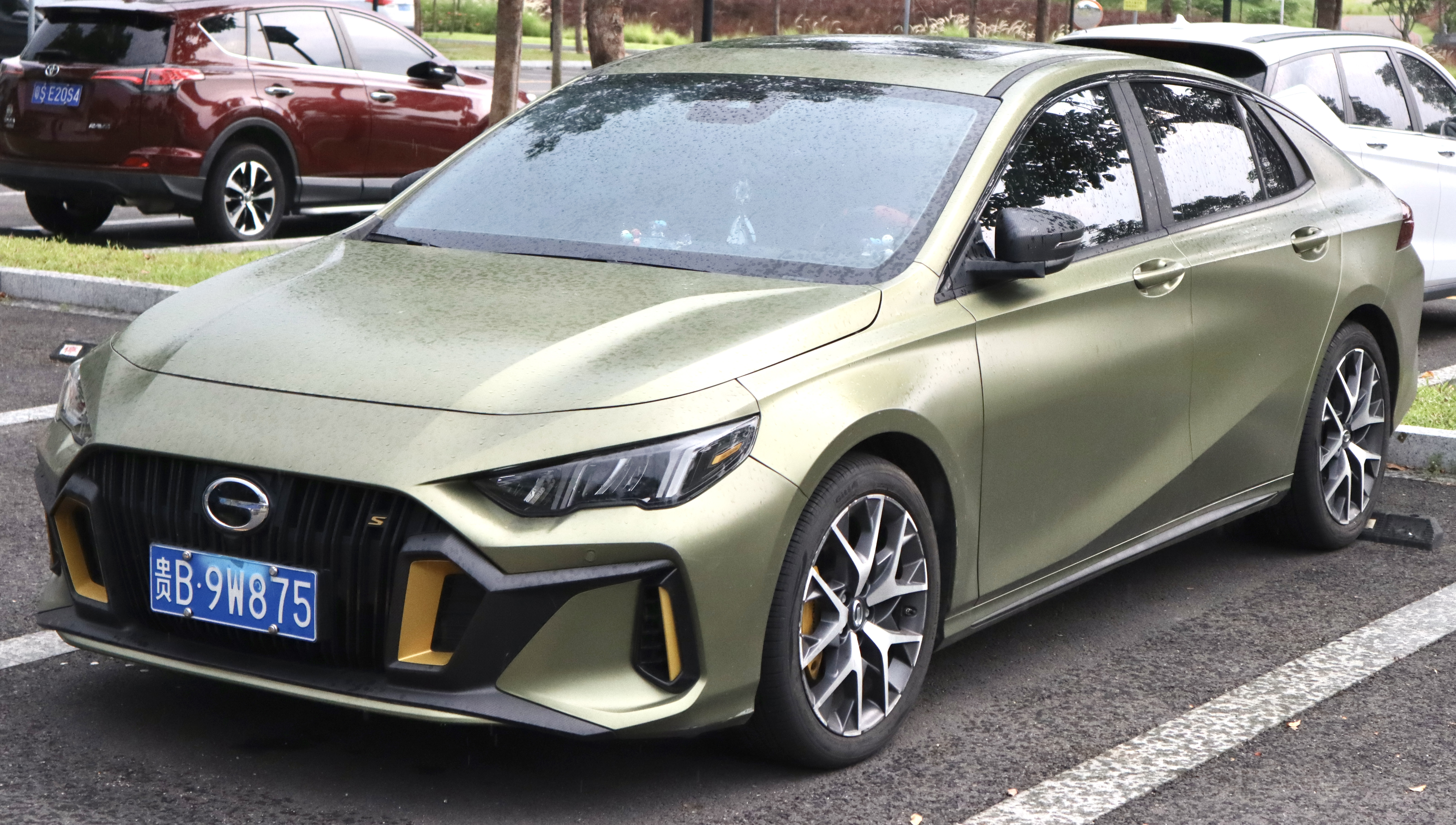

Overview
- Manufacturer: GAC Motor
- Also called: GAC Empow (export); Dodge Attitude (fourth generation, Mexico)
- Production: 2021–present
- Assembly: China: Yichang

Body and chassis
- Class: Compact car (C)
- Body style: 4-door sedan
- Layout: Front-engine, front-wheel-drive
- Platform: GPMA platform (Global Platform Modular Architecture)
- Related: Trumpchi GA4

Powertrain
- Engine: Petrol: 1.5 L 4A15J2 turbo I4; 2.0 L 4B20J3 turbo I4; Petrol hybrid: 2.0 L 4B20L1 I4
- Electric motor: 1x AC PMSM (2.0 L Hybrid)
- Power output: Petrol: 125–130 kW (168–174 hp; 170–177 PS) (1.5 L Turbo); 195 kW (261 hp; 265 PS) (2.0 L Turbo); Hybrid: 103 kW (138 hp; 140 PS) (2.0 L engine); 134 kW (180 hp; 182 PS) (electric motor); 175 kW (235 hp; 238 PS) (combined system output)
- Transmission: 7-speed dual-clutch; 8-speed Aisin automatic; e-CVT
- Hybrid drivetrain: Parallel (2.0 L Hybrid)
- Battery: 2.076 kWh li-ion battery (hybrid)

Dimensions
- Wheelbase: 2,736 mm (107.7 in)
- Length: 4,700–4,753 mm (185.0–187.1 in)
- Width: 1,850 mm (72.8 in)
- Height: 1,432–1,440 mm (56.4–56.7 in)
- Curb weight: 1,345–1,500 kg (2,965–3,307 lb); 1,500–1,550 kg (3,307–3,417 lb) (hybrid)

Chronology
- Predecessor: Trumpchi GA4

The Trumpchi Empow (Chinese: 影豹; lit. 'Shadow Leopard') is a compact sedan produced by GAC Group under the Trumpchi brand in China and the GAC Motor brand globally. It was intended to be a sports sedan to differentiate from the GA4 compact sedan.

== Overview ==
The Trumpchi Empow was first previewed in 2020 at the 2020 Guangzhou Auto Show in semi-concept form as the Trumpchi EMPOW55 Concept. The production Trumpchi Empow was officially launched during the 2021 Shanghai Auto Show in Shanghai as the successor of the Trumpchi GA4 compact sedan in China, despite the GA4 continuing to be sold alongside and also received a facelift in early 2021. The production Empow sedan is based on GAC's new Global Platform Modular Architecture.

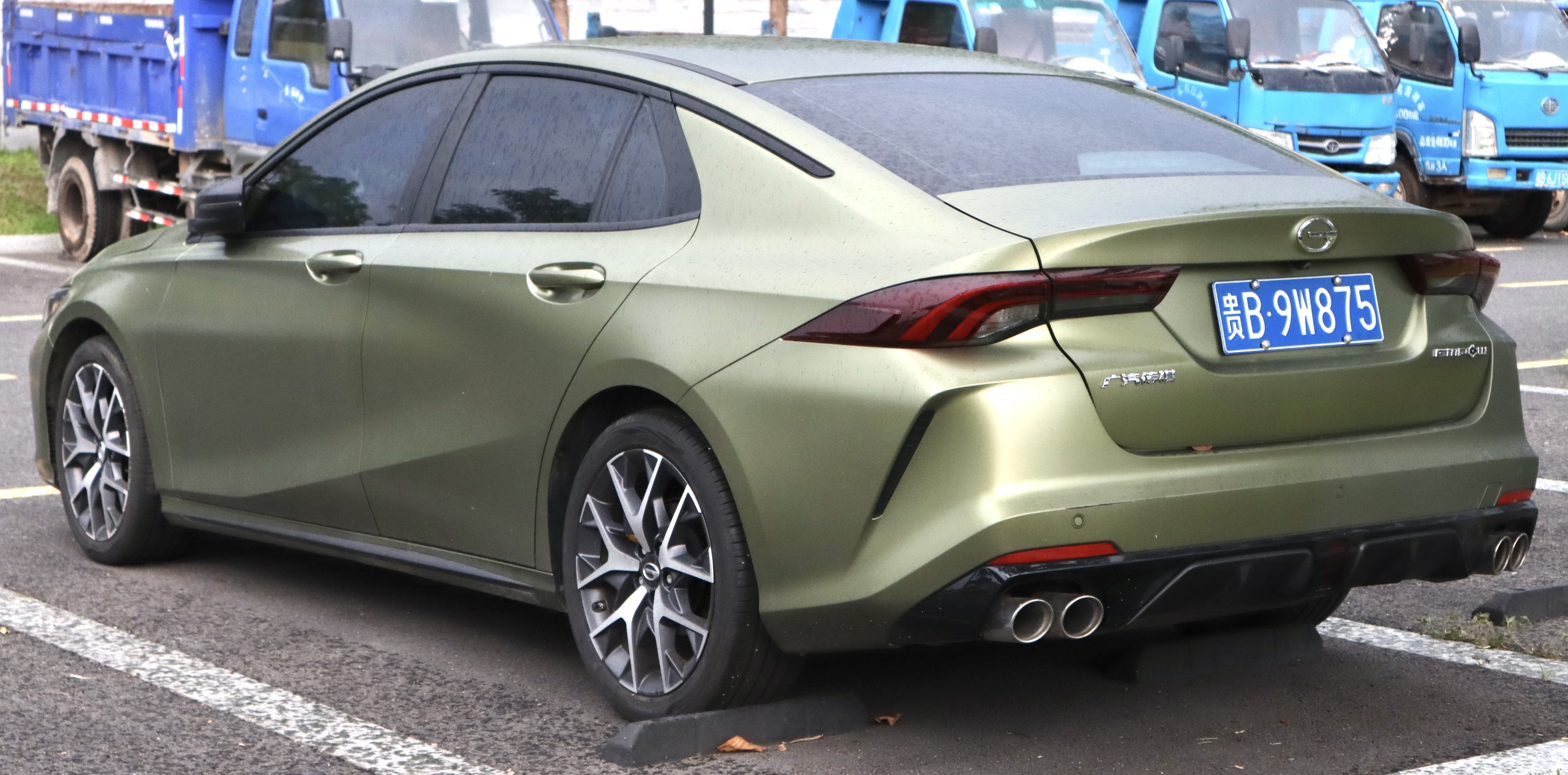
Rear view

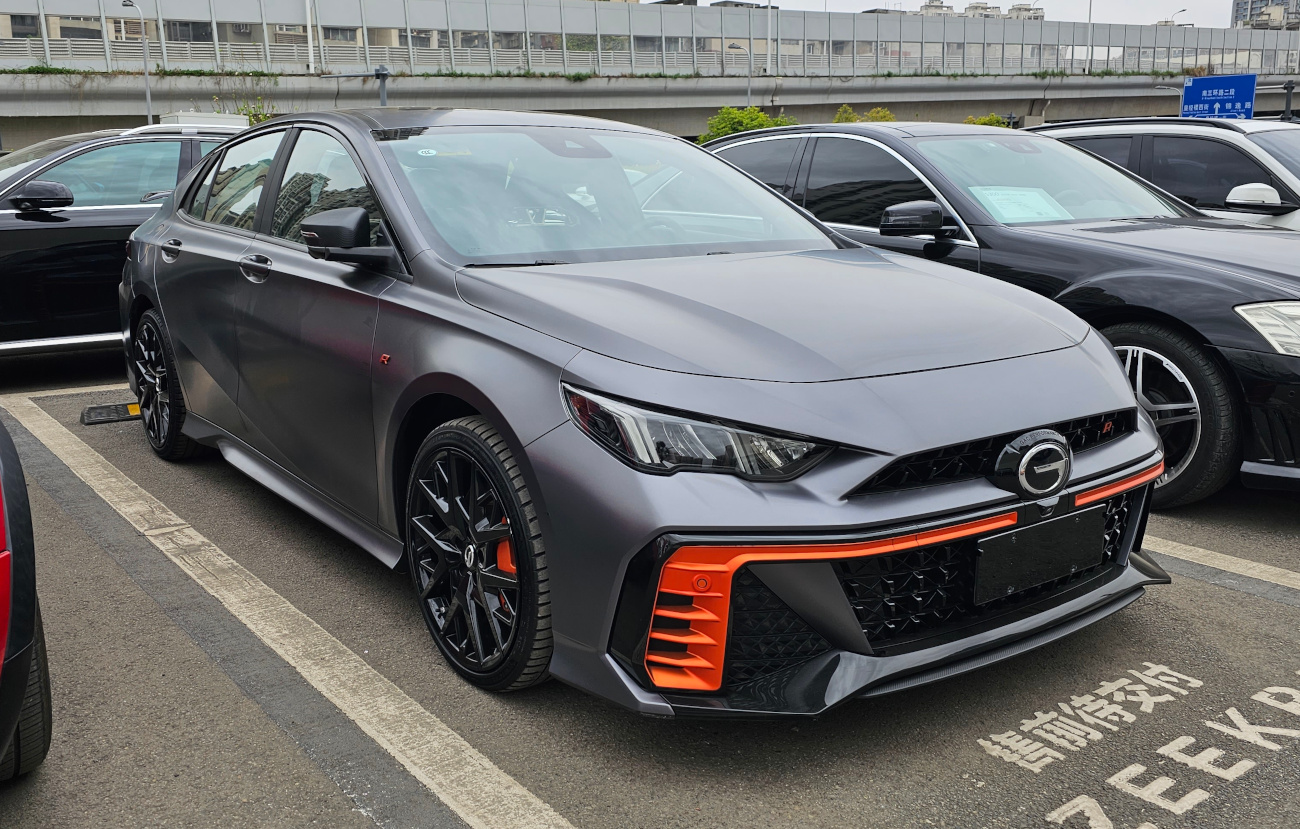
Trumpchi Empow R

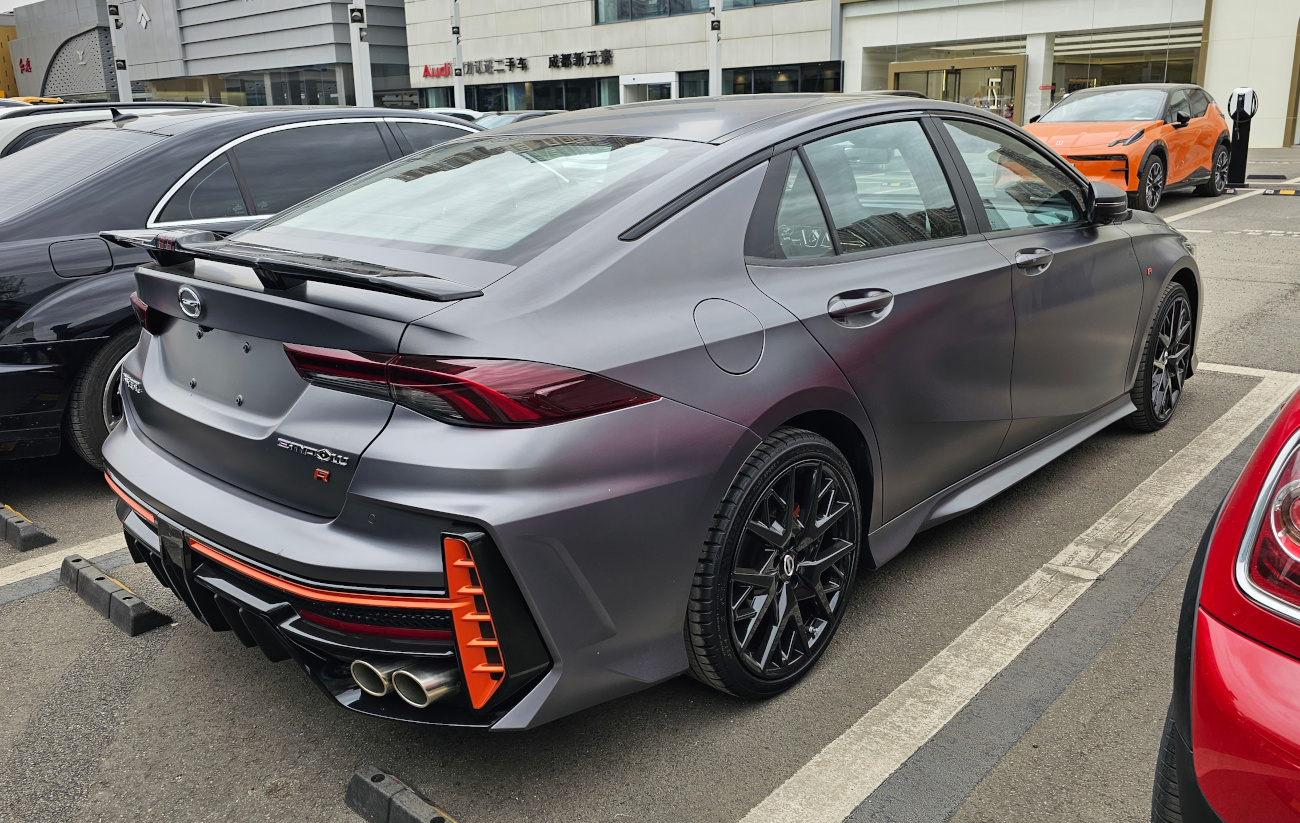
Rear view

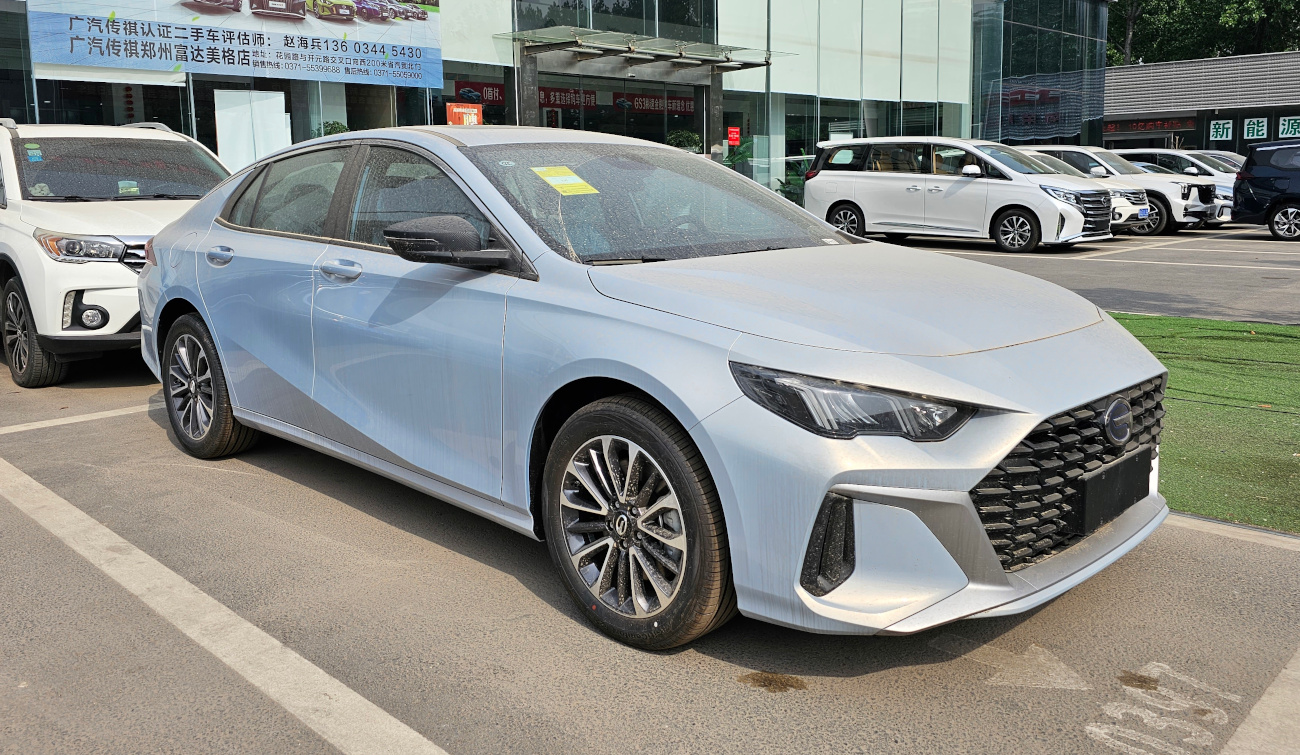
Trumpchi Empow Hybrid

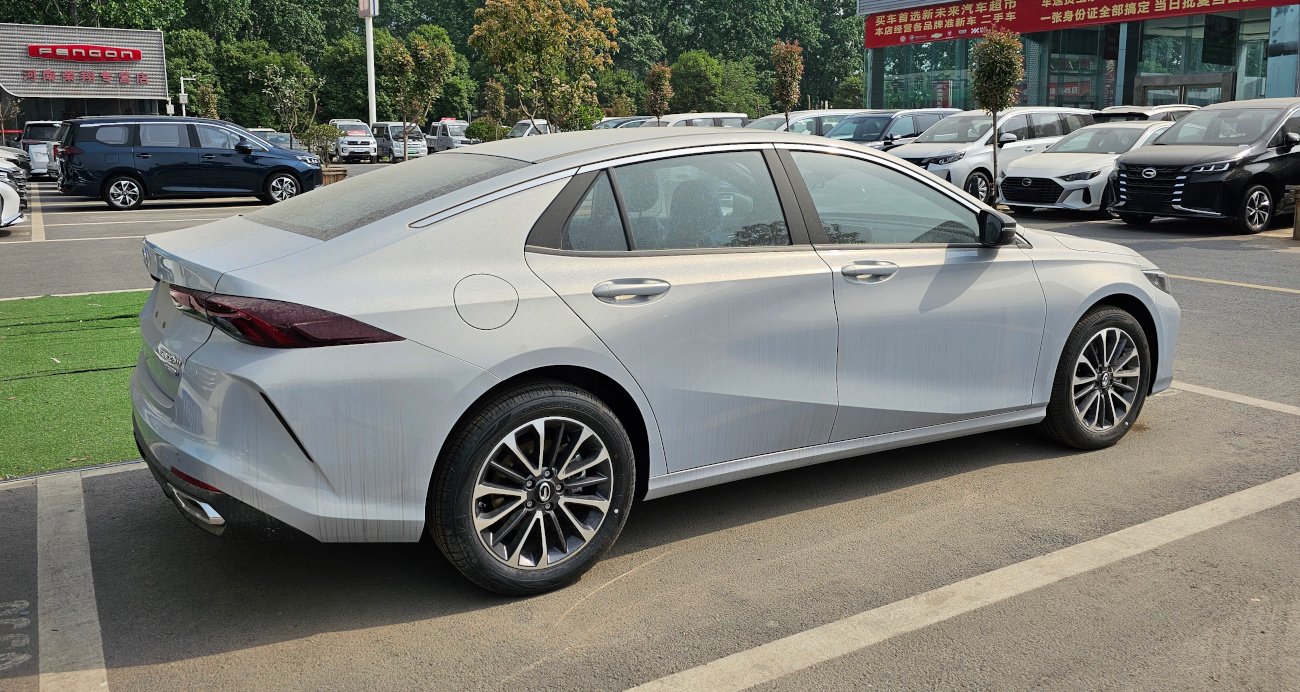
Rear view

== Powertrain ==
The Empow 270T is powered by a 1.5-litre turbo I4 with 125 kW (168 hp; 170 PS) and 270 N⋅m (27.5 kg⋅m; 199 lb⋅ft) of torque mated to a 7-speed dual clutch transmission. The Empow is front-wheel drive only and acceleration from 0 to 100 km/h (0 to 62 mph) takes 7 seconds. Sales commenced in 2021 and prices for Trumpchi Empow 270T in China ranges from 98,800 to 128,800 yuan at launch.

The Empow R 400T, is equipped with a 2.0-litre turbocharged engine producing 195 kW (261 hp; 265 PS) and 400 N⋅m (40.8 kg⋅m; 295 lb⋅ft) of torque, mated to an 8-speed Aisin automatic gearbox. The Empow R 400T was introduced in the 2023 Shanghai Auto Show and became available since April 2023. The new 2.0-litre powertrain accelerates the vehicle from 0 to 100 km/h (0 to 62 mph) in 5.7 seconds. Prices for Trumpchi Empow R 400T in China ranges from 138,000 to 158,000 yuan at launch.

The Empow R × ABT, a co-brand version collaborated with ABT that comes with more aggressive styling is powered by the same 2.0-litre turbocharged powertrain. Also introduced in the 2023 Shanghai Auto Show, this version came equipped with an ABT-designed aerodynamics body kit and ABT branding in interior parts. The sale of this version will start by the end of year 2023.

A hybrid version was introduced in late 2022. This version came equipped with a 2.0-litre naturally aspirated Atkinson-cycle engine producing 103 kW (138 hp; 140 PS) and 180 N⋅m (18.4 kg⋅m; 133 lb⋅ft) of torque, mated with an electric motor of 134 kW (180 hp; 182 PS) and 300 N⋅m (30.6 kg⋅m; 221 lb⋅ft) of torque, with a maximum combined output of 175 kW (235 hp; 238 PS). The hybrid version could accelerate from 0 to 60 km/h (0 to 37 mph) in 3.4 seconds. Prices for Trumpchi Empow Hybrid in China ranges from 128,000 to 148,000 yuan at launch.

Specs
| Model | Years | Transmission | Power@rpm | Torque@rpm | 0–100 km/h (0–62 mph) (Official) | Top speed |
Petrol
| 1.5 Turbo | 2021–present | 7-speed DCT | 125 kW (170 PS; 168 hp) at 5,500 rpm 130 kW (177 PS; 174 hp) at 5,500 rpm | 270 N⋅m (199 lb⋅ft; 28 kg⋅m) at 1,400–4,500 rpm | 6.95s | 200 km/h (124 mph) |
| 2.0 Turbo | 2023–present | 8-speed automatic | 195 kW (265 PS; 261 hp) | 400 N⋅m (295 lb⋅ft; 41 kg⋅m) | 5.7s | 230 km/h (143 mph) |
Hybrid
| 2.0 Hybrid | 2022–present | CVT | 175 kW (238 PS; 235 hp) | | | 165 km/h (103 mph) |

== Dodge Attitude ==
In July 2024, the Empow was announced as the fourth generation Dodge Attitude for the Mexican market.

== Sales ==
| Year | China |
|---|---|
| 2023 | 41,065 |
| 2024 | 23,707 |
| 2025 | 11,333 |
| 2026 | 1,423 |

== See also ==
- List of GAC vehicles
