= GA3 =

GA3 may refer to:

- George Atkinson III (1992–2019), American football player
- Georgia's 3rd congressional district, a congressional district in the U.S. state of Georgia
- Georgia State Route 3, a north–south highway in the U.S. state of Georgia
- GA3, Gibberellic acid, a form of the gibberellin plant hormone
- Trumpchi GA3, a 2013–2019 Chinese subcompact sedan
- United Nations General Assembly Third Committee, one of the six committees of the United Nations General Assembly
