= Trumpchi GS3 =

Chinese subcompact crossover SUV

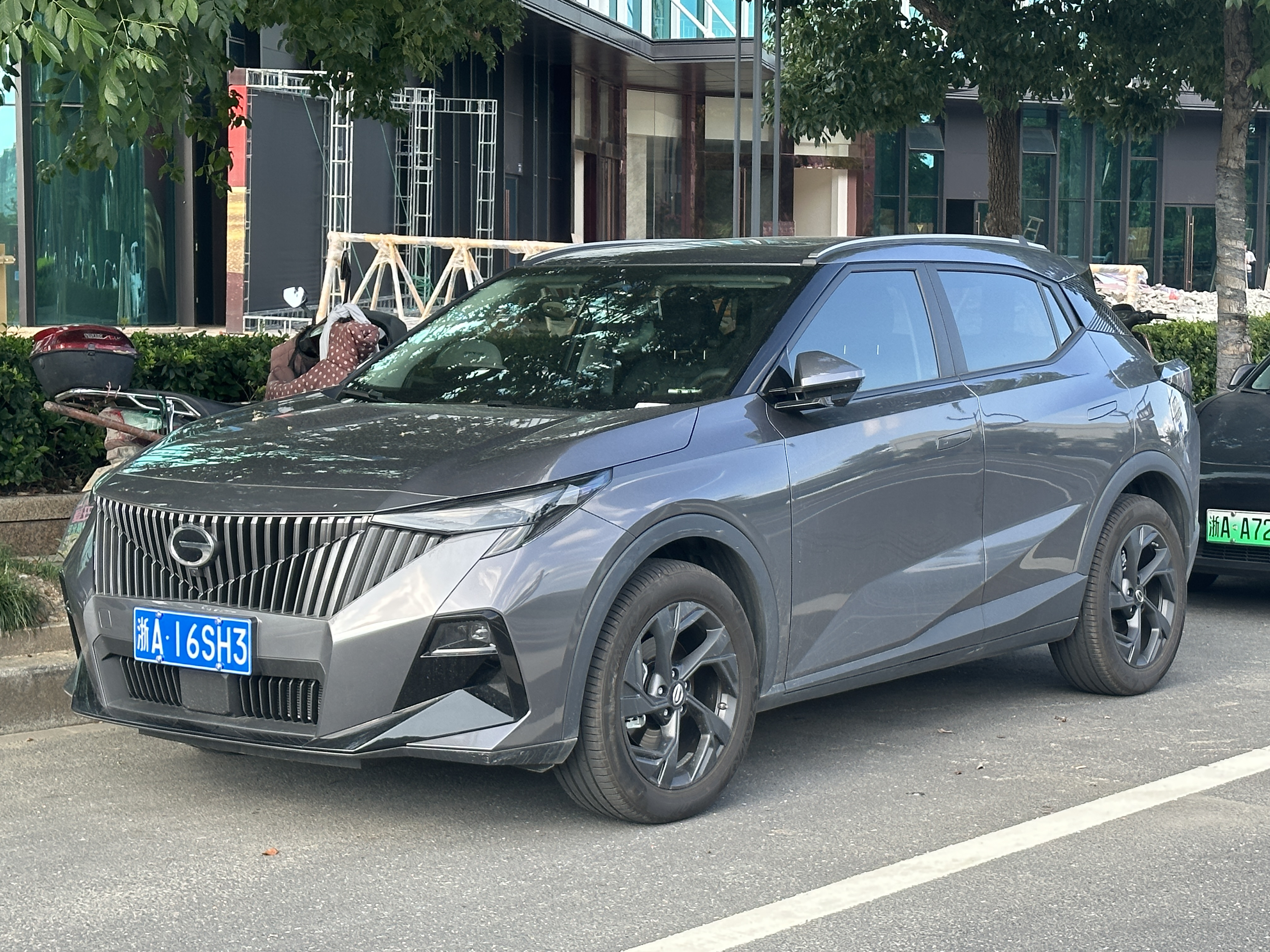
- Trumpchi GS3 II

Overview
- Manufacturer: GAC Group
- Also called: GAC GS3 (export)
- Production: 2017–present

Body and chassis
- Class: Subcompact crossover SUV (B)
- Body style: 5-door SUV
- Layout: Front-engine, front-wheel-drive

The Trumpchi GS3 or GAC GS3 or is a subcompact crossover SUV produced by GAC Group under the GAC Motor brand globally and the Trumpchi brand in China.

== First generation (2017) ==
First generation
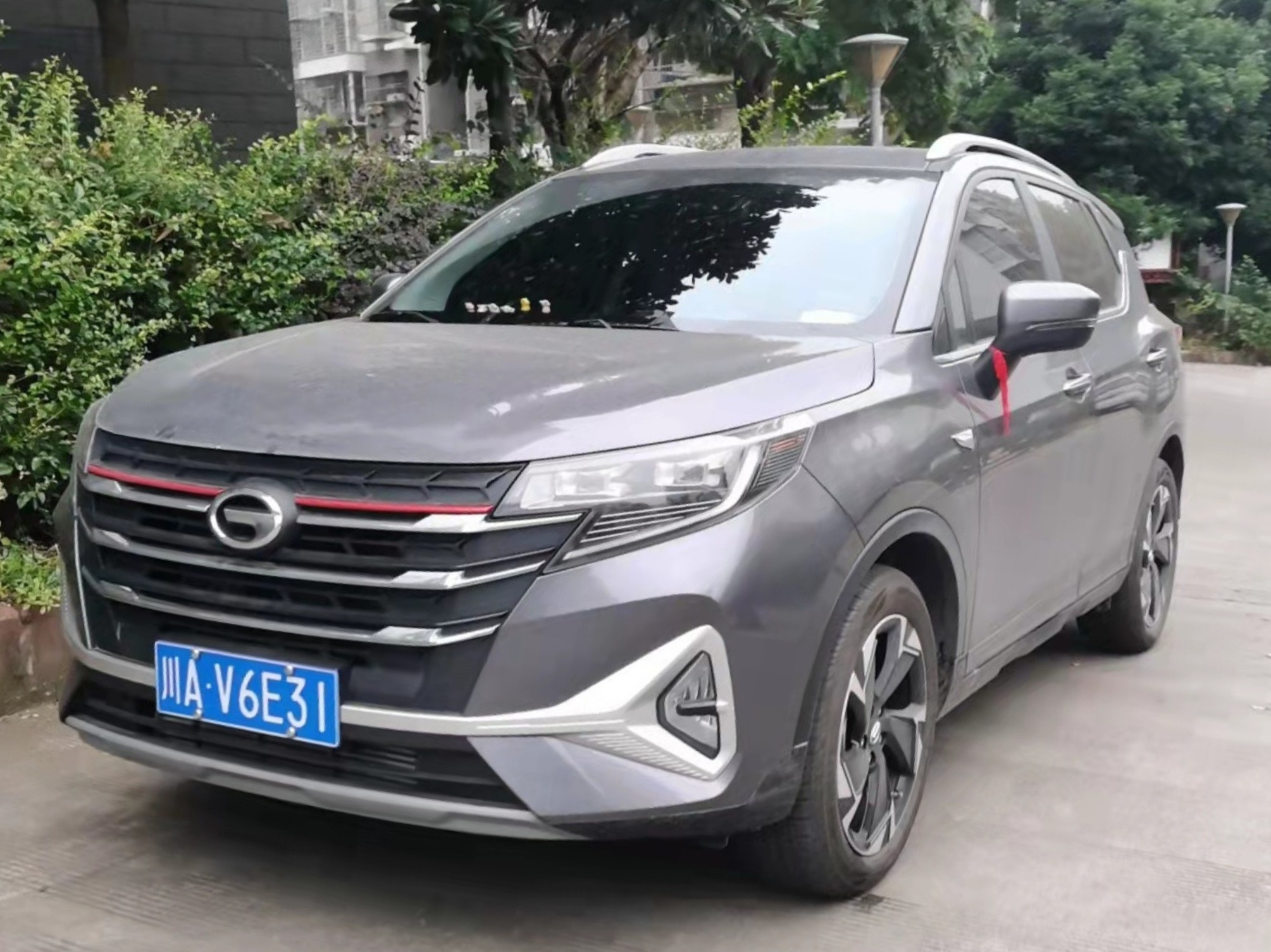
- Trumpchi GS3 Power

Overview
- Also called: Trumpchi GS3 (China)
- Production: 2017–2022
- Assembly: China: Guangzhou
- Designer: Xiao Lin, Wang Pei

Body and chassis
- Related: Trumpchi GA3S; Trumpchi GE3

Powertrain
- Engine: Petrol: 1.3 L turbo I4; 1.5 L 3B15J1 turbo I3; 1.5 L I4; 1.5 L 4A15J1 turbo I4
- Transmission: 5-speed manual; 6-speed manual; 6-speed automatic; 7-speed DCT

Dimensions
- Wheelbase: 2,560 mm (100.8 in)
- Length: 4,350 mm (171.3 in)
- Width: 1,825 mm (71.9 in)
- Height: 1,655–1,685 mm (65.2–66.3 in)
- Curb weight: 1,315–1,392 kg (2,899–3,069 lb)

The first-generation GS3 is based on the same platform as the Trumpchi GA3S sedan, and it debuted on the 2017 Chengdu Auto Show and the 2018 Detroit Auto Show and was launched on the Chinese car market shortly after.

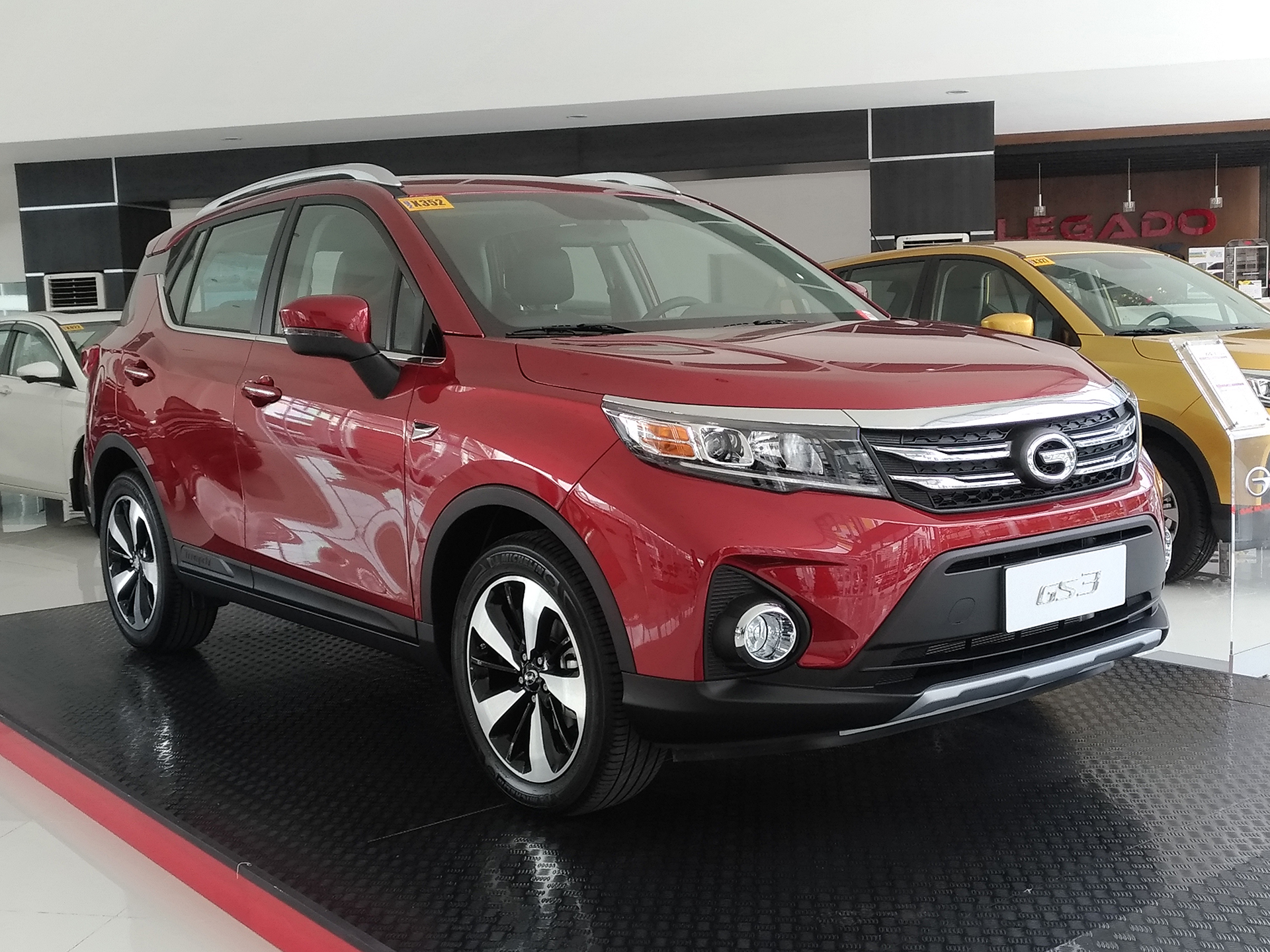
GAC GS3 200T

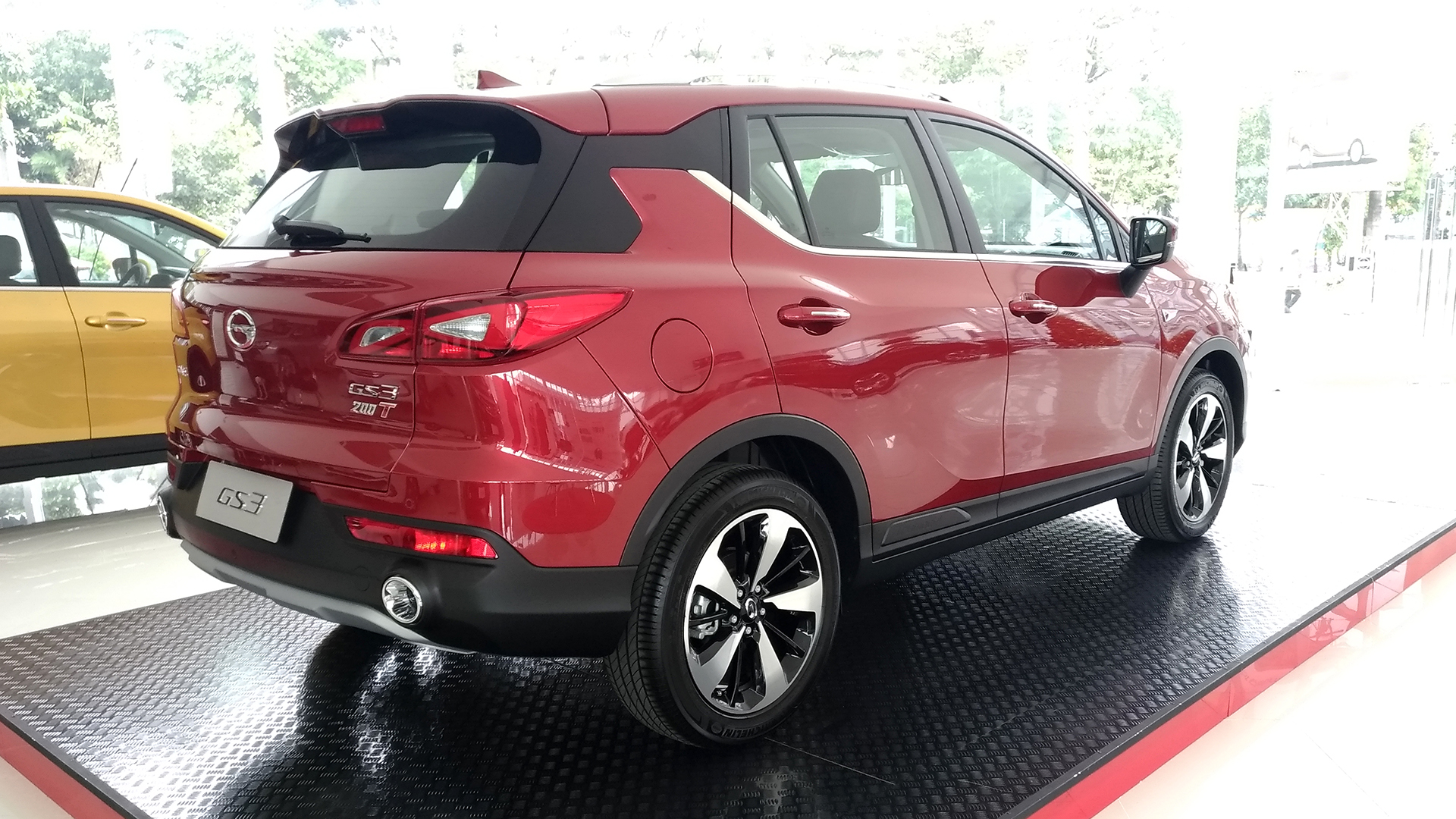
GAC GS3 200T - rear view

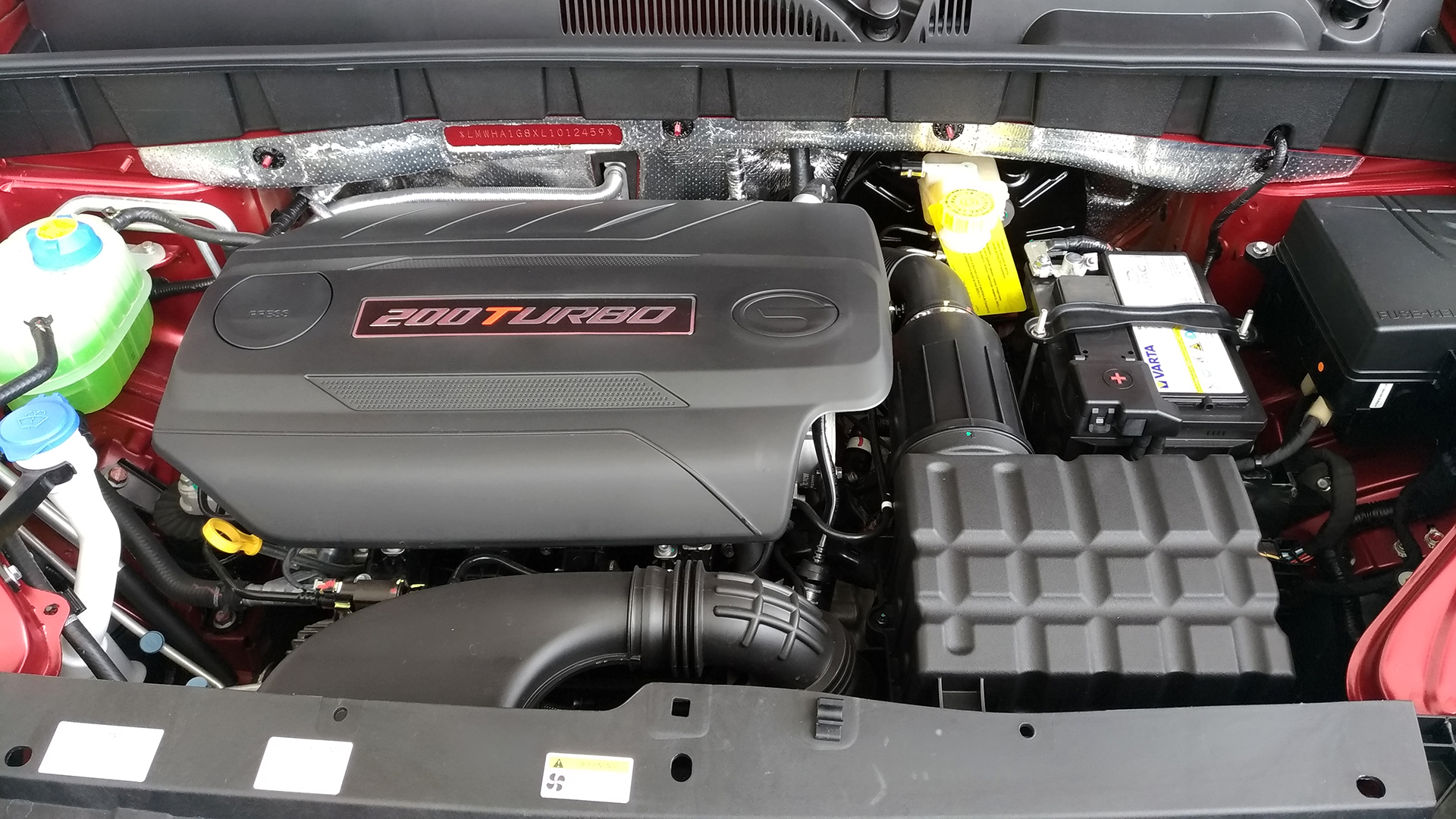
GAC GS3 200T - 1.3 L turbo engine

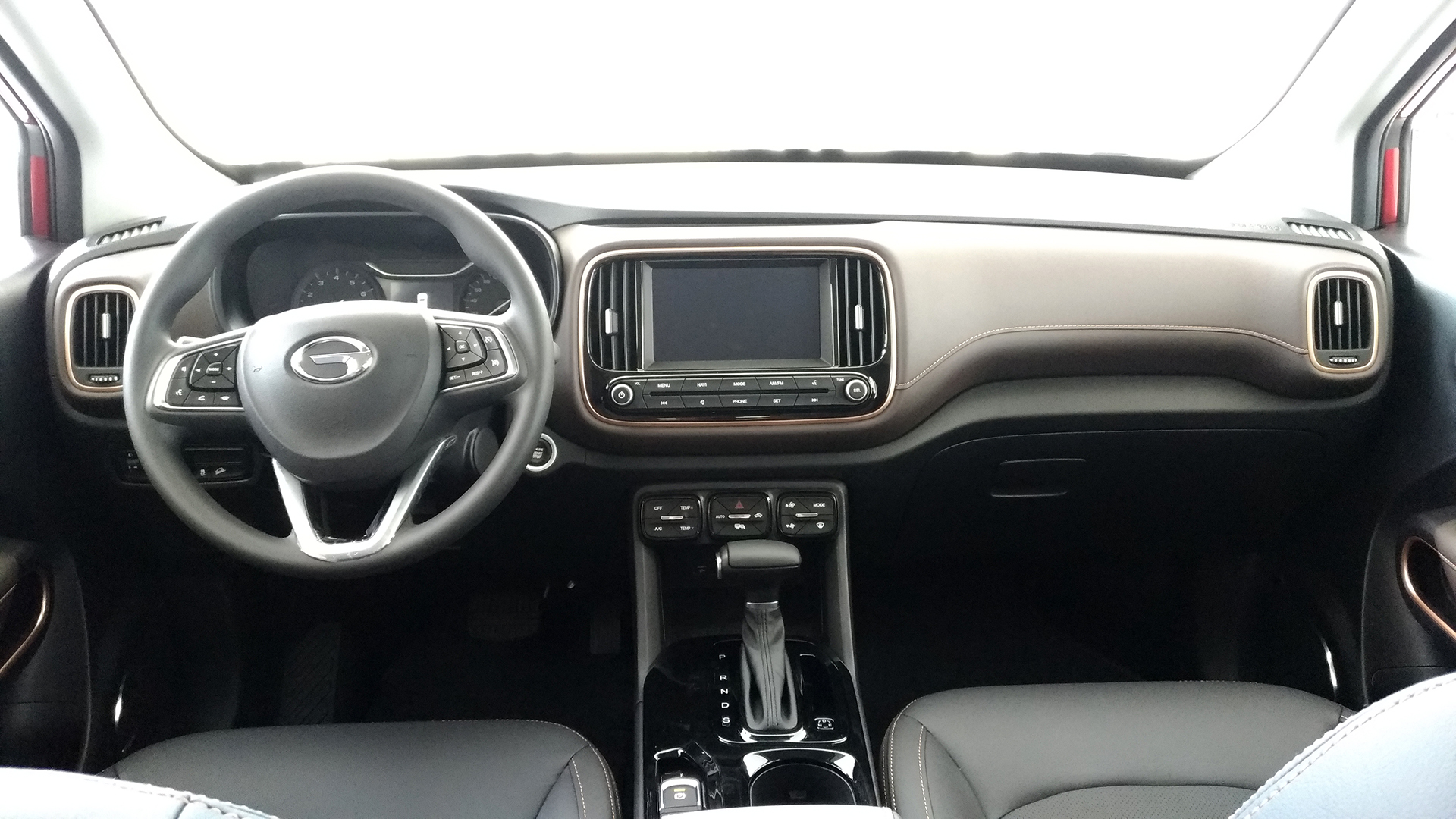
GAC GS3 200T - interior

=== Powertrain ===
The engines available includes a 1.3-litre turbo producing 137 hp and a 1.5-litre producing 114 hp, both mated to a 5-speed manual or a 6-speed automatic.

=== Foreign market ===
The GS3 was launched in the Philippines in October 2019, less than a year after GAC Motor debuted in the country then was sold on limited offer in some GAC Dealerships for some units since 2023

In December 2021, the GAC GS3 was introduced in Malaysia under the Tan Chong administration. Two variants are available, it is powered by a 1.5-litre petrol engine paired to a 6-speed automatic.

=== Trumpchi GE3 ===
An all-electric version of the GS3 called the GE3 was revealed at the North American International Auto Show in Detroit, United States in January 2017. It went on sale later that year in July.

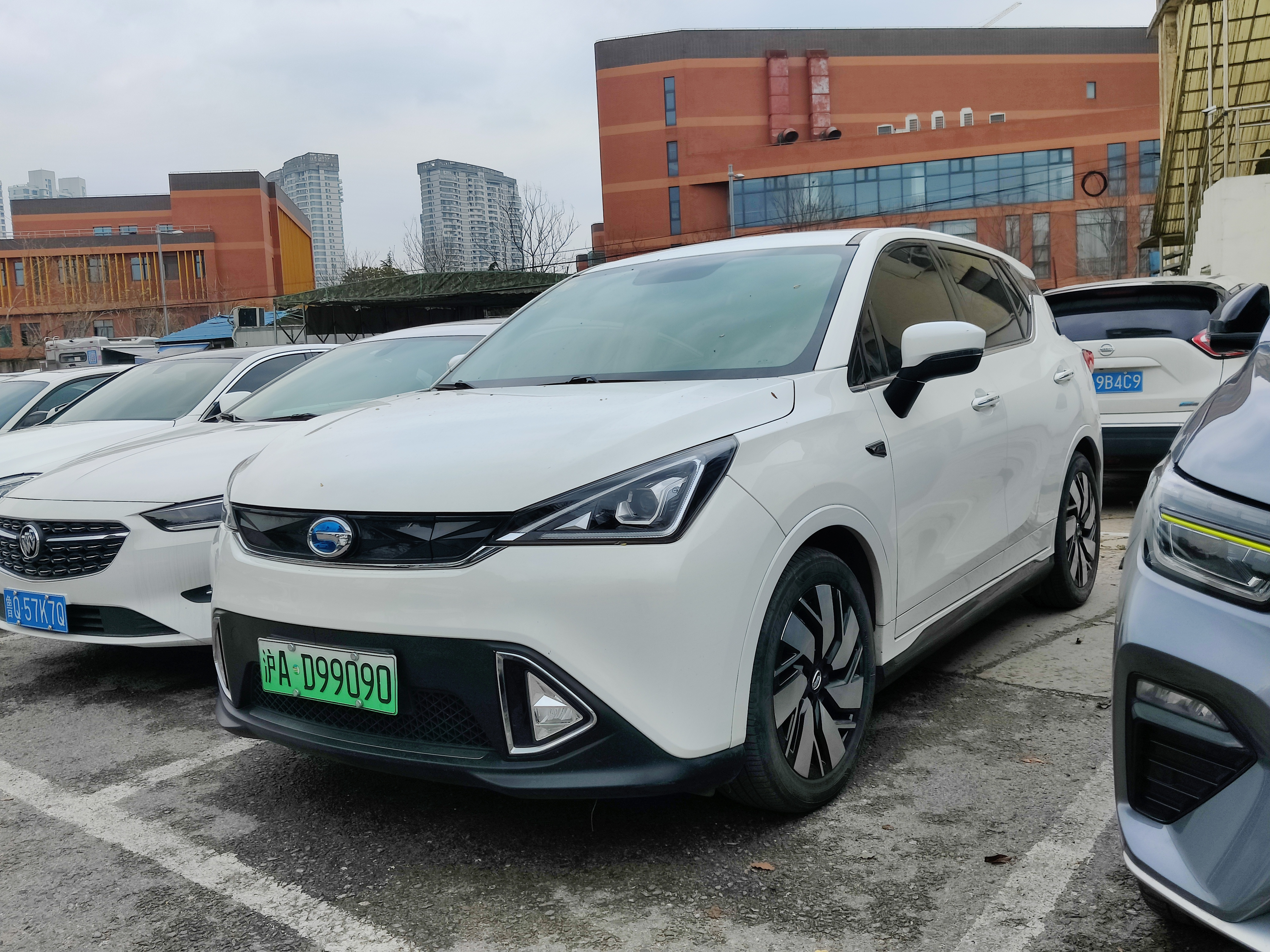
GE3 front quarter

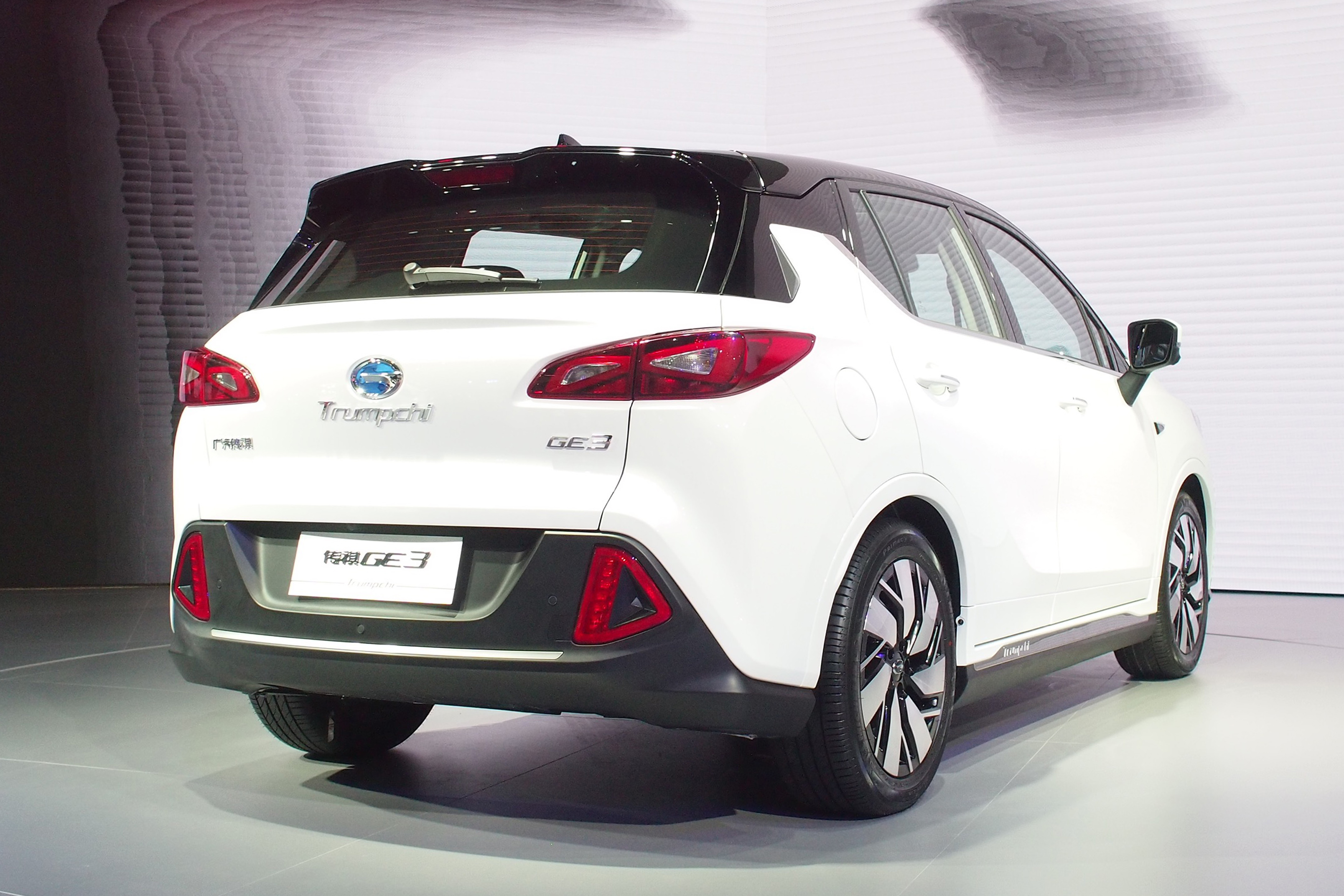
GE3 rear quarter

=== Trumpchi GS3 Power ===
The Trumpchi GS3 Power is the facelift unveiled in 2021 and was sold alongside the pre-facelift model as a more premium option. The Trumpchi GS3 Power is available with a 1.5-litre Turbo PFI inline-three engine producing 150 PS at 5,500 rpm and 226 Nm from 1,500 to 4,000 rpm, and the 1.5-litre TGDi engine developing 177 PS at 5,500 rpm and 255 Nm from 1,500 to 4,000 rpm. Suspension setup of the GS3 Power is MacPherson struts for the front suspension and torsion beam suspension for the rear, disc brakes on all four corners with ventilated front units and solid rears. Electric power steering is also standard.

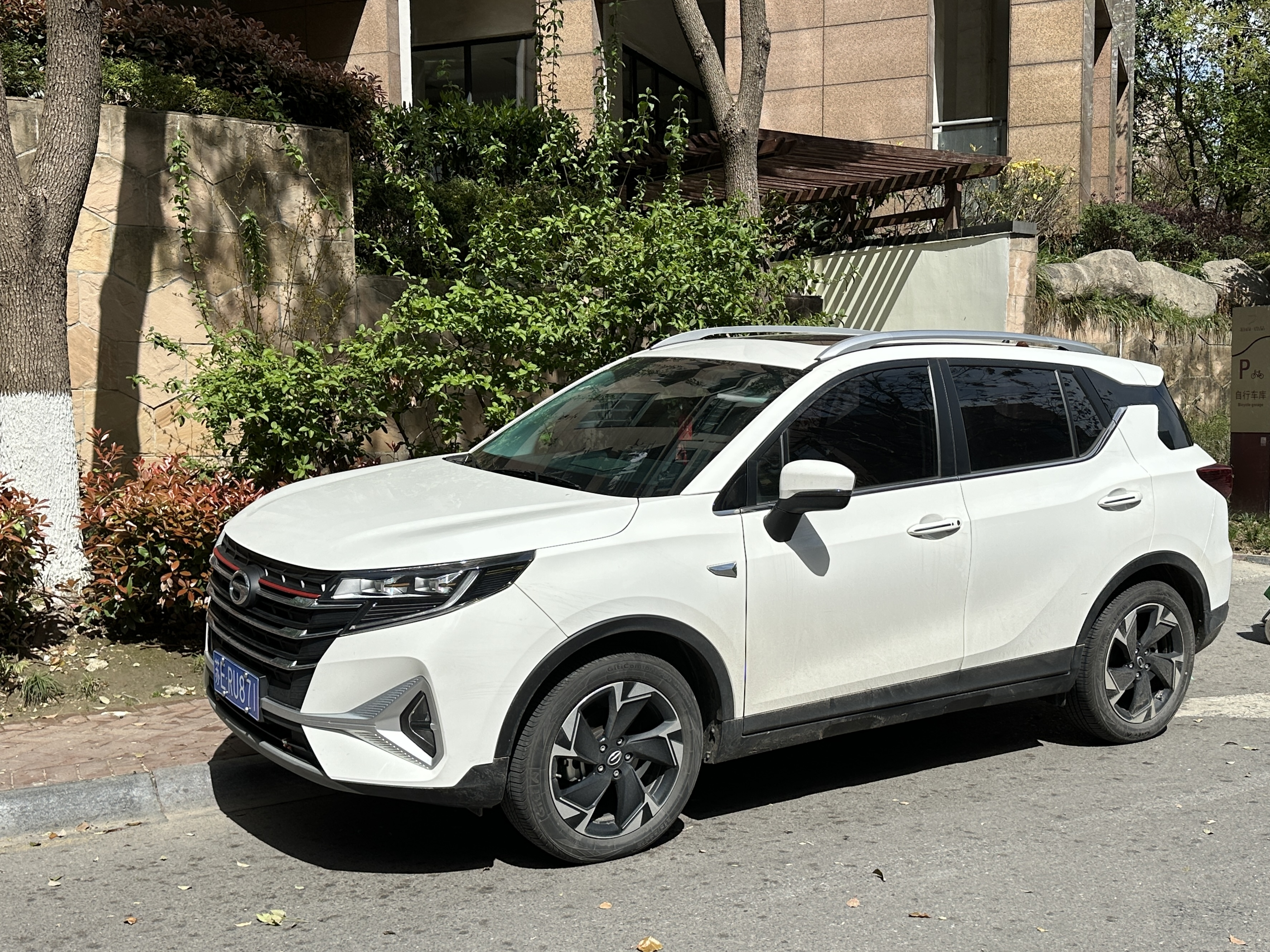
Trumpchi GS3 Power - front view

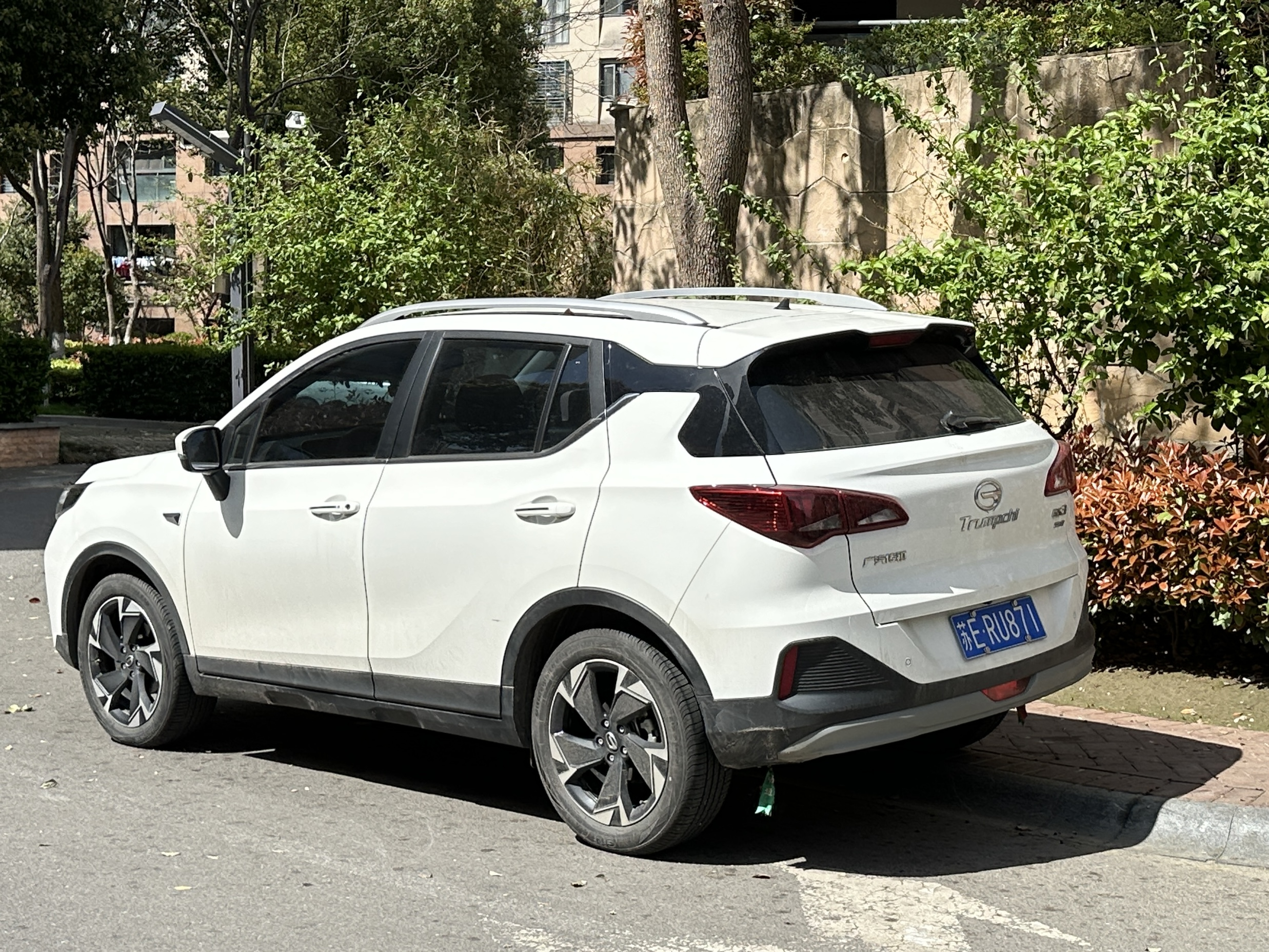
Trumpchi GS3 Power - rear view

== Second generation (2023) ==
Second generation
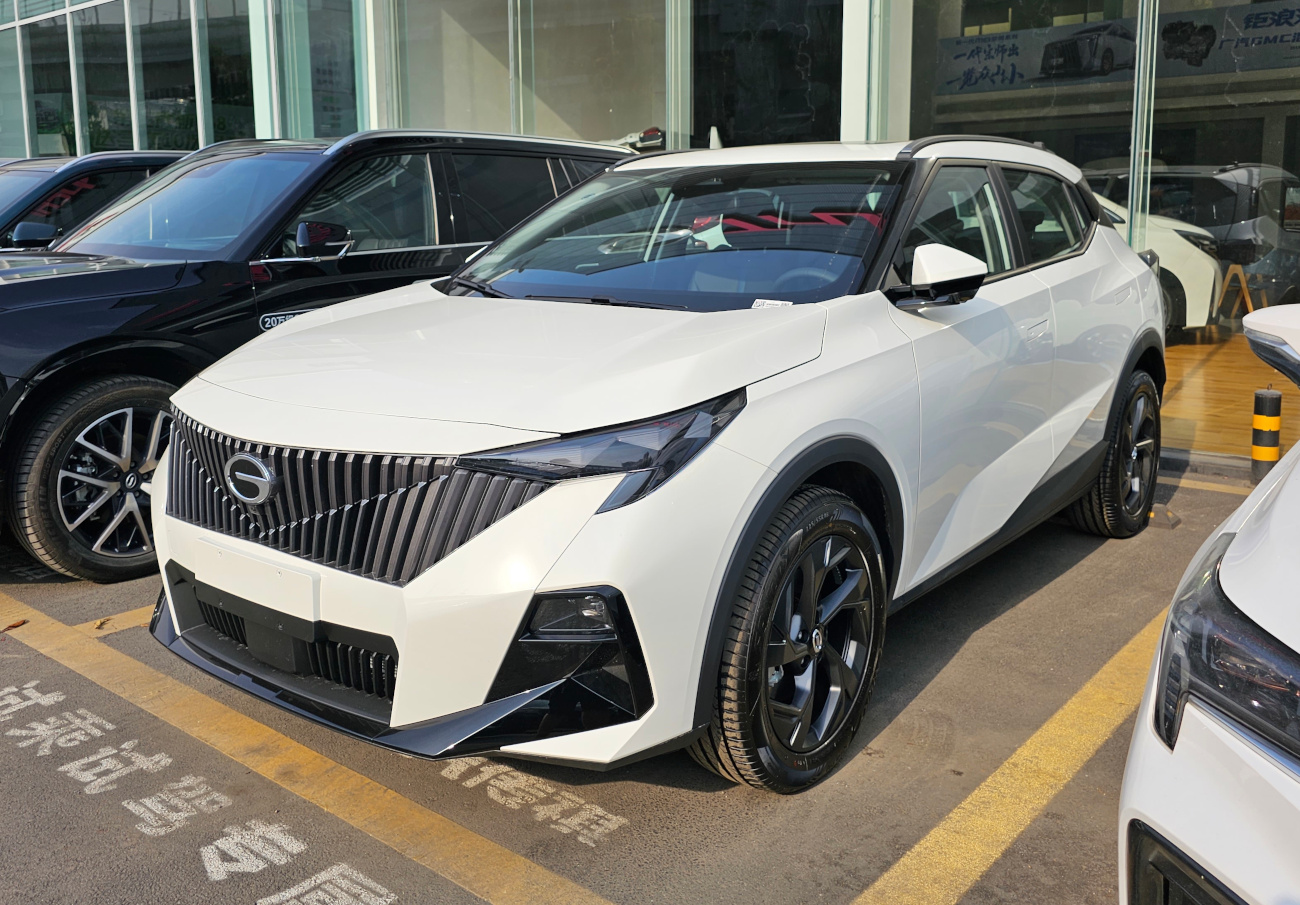
- 2023 Trumpchi GS3 II

Overview
- Also called: Trumpchi GS3 Yingsu (影速); GAC GS3 Emzoom (Middle East, Philippines and Malaysia); GAC Emzoom (Mexico and Australia); Itala 35 (Italy)
- Production: 2023–present
- Assembly: China: Guangzhou; Malaysia: Kuala Lumpur (TCMA)

Body and chassis
- Platform: GPMA platform

Powertrain
- Engine: Petrol: 1.5 L 4A15J2 turbo I4
- Power output: 130 kW (177 PS; 174 hp)
- Transmission: 7-speed DCT

Dimensions
- Wheelbase: 2,650 mm (104.3 in)
- Length: 4,410–4,446 mm (173.6–175.0 in)
- Width: 1,850 mm (72.8 in)
- Height: 1,600 mm (63.0 in)
- Curb weight: 1,370–1,415 kg (3,020–3,120 lb)

The second-generation GS3 was launched in China on 20 February 2023 with the additional Yingsu (影速) Chinese name.

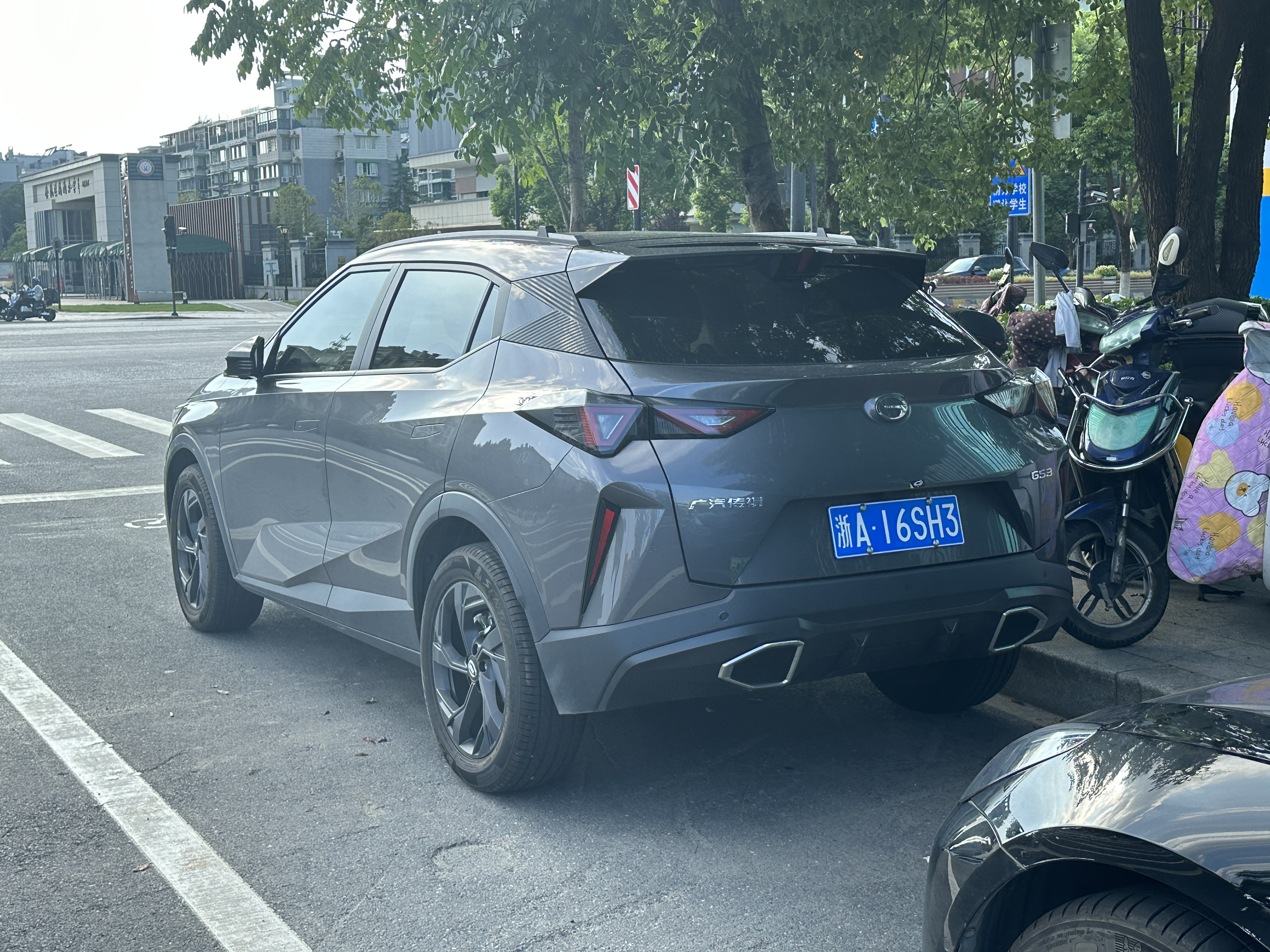
Trumpchi GS3 II rear

=== Markets ===
==== Australia ====
The second-generation GS3 was launched in Australia on 18 November 2025, as part of GAC's entry to Australia as the GAC Emzoom, in the sole unnamed variant. The GAC Emzoom was introduced to the Australian market as a budget-friendly compact SUV starting at approximately $25,590 before on-road costs. The GAC Emzoom lineup in Australia has expanded with a new entry-level Premium trim, undercutting the original Luxury model being priced from $22,990 drive-away, making it one of Australia’s cheapest SUVs. Both variants share the same 1.5-litre turbocharged four-cylinder petrol engine (125kW/270Nm) paired with a 7-speed dual-clutch transmission, and come standard with a 7-year, unlimited-kilometre warranty.

==== Brunei ====
The second-generation GS3 was launched in Brunei under the GAC brand as part of the brand's entry to Brunei as the GS3 Emzoom on 7 February 2025. At launch, it is available in two variants: Standard and R-Style.

==== Malaysia ====
The second-generation GS3 was launched in Malaysia on 18 April 2024, under the GAC brand as the GS3 Emzoom_{,} with two variants: Exclusive and Premium-R. At launch, the GS3 is a fully imported CBU model from China and local assembly commenced in August 2024 only for the Premium-R variant. The Exclusive variant was re-introduced as a CKD model and a new Standard variant was added to the range in October 2024. The locally assembled Premium R variant was updated on 4 May 2026, received the new ‘Flowing Diamond Star’ grille and new dual-tone exterior colour choices.

==== Mexico ====
GAC entered the Mexican market in November 2023 with the GS3—sold as the Emzoom in Mexico—as well as the GS8.

==== Philippines ====
The second-generation GS3 was launched in the Philippines on 30 June 2023, under the GAC brand as the GS3 Emzoom, with three trim levels: GS, GB and R-Style. The Touring trim was added in August 2024, it is based on the GB trim features a sportier design with the bodykit from the R-Style. The R-Style Black Edition went on sale in January 2025 for a limited time period.

The GS3 Emzoom line-up in the Philippines was updated on 29 April 2026. The changes include a new Star Diamond grille for the GB trim, the R-Style trim received the Black Edition styling package, a new 14.6-inch touchscreen infotainment system with wireless connectivity for Android Auto and Apple CarPlay, new convenience and safety features, and the entry-level GS trim was discontinued.

==== South Africa ====
The second-generation GS3 was launched in South Africa on 15 August 2024, under the GAC brand as part of the brand's entry to South Africa as the GS3 Emzoom. It is available in three trim levels: Comfort, Executive and R-Style. In September 2025, the limited edition Comfort Collection model was made available limited to 150 units temporarily as an entry-level variant. In May 2026, the Comfort trim was replaced by the Nova as the entry-level trim.

==== Vietnam ====
The second-generation GS3 was launched in Vietnam on 10 July 2026, under the GAC brand as the GS3 Emzoom, in the sole Premium R variant.

=== Powertrain ===
The second-generation GS3 is equipped with a 1.5-litre turbocharged engine producing 130 kW (177 PS; 174 hp). The engine is paired with a 7-speed DCT transmission.

Specs
| Model | Years | Transmission | Power@rpm | Torque@rpm | 0–100 km/h (0–62 mph) (Official) | Top speed |
Petrol
| 1.5 Turbo | 2023–present | 7-speed DCT | 130 kW (177 PS; 174 hp) at 5,500 rpm | 270 N⋅m (199 lb⋅ft; 28 kg⋅m) at 1,400–4,500 rpm | 7.5s | 190 km/h (118 mph) |

=== Safety ===
ASEAN NCAP test results GAC Emzoom (2024)
| Test | Points |
|---|---|
| Overall: | 5 /5 stars |
| Adult occupant: | 36.60 |
| Child occupant: | 16.43 |
| Safety assist: | 17.86 |
| Motorcyclist Safety: | 17.50 |

== Sales ==
| Year | China |
|---|---|
| 2023 | 46,120 |
| 2024 | 55,017 |
| 2025 | 63,377 |

== See also ==
- List of GAC vehicles
