= Trumpchi GA3S =

Chinese compact sedan

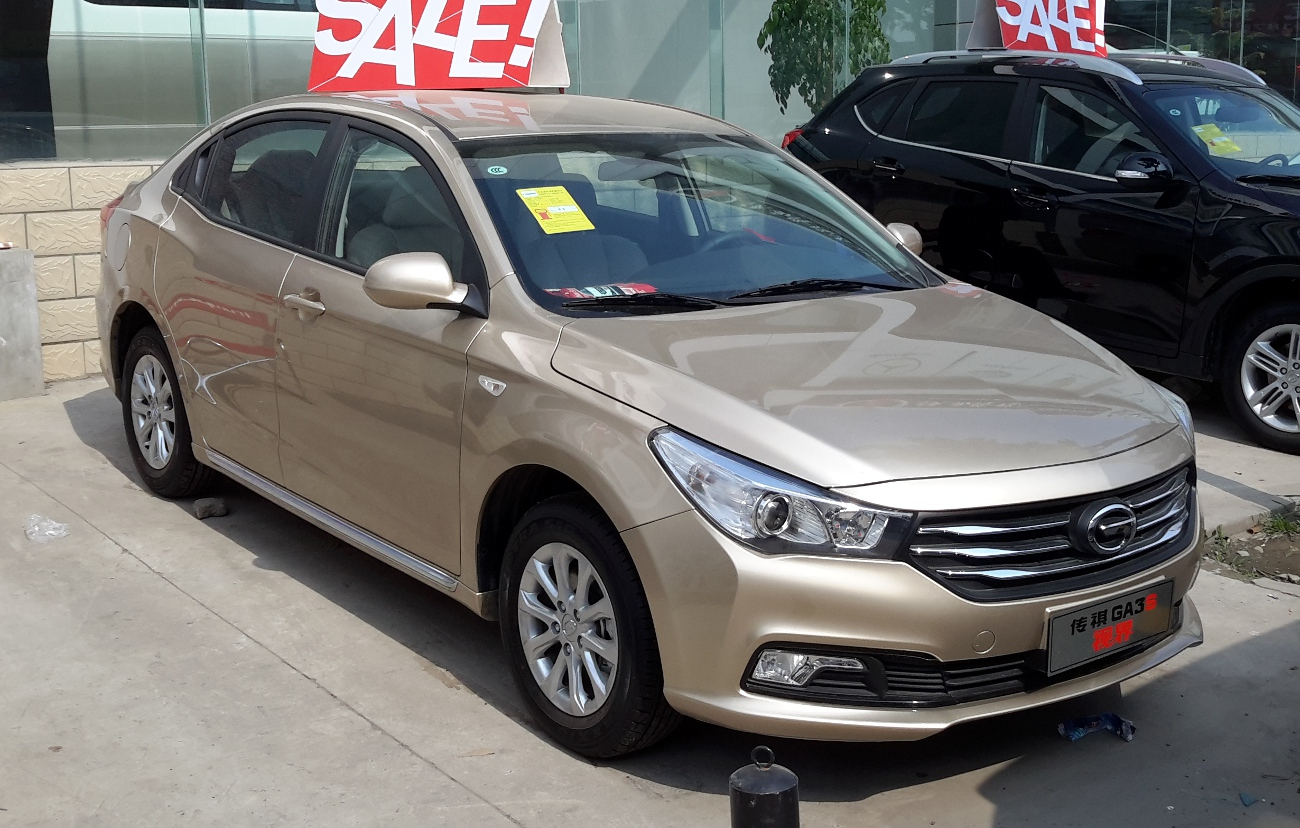
- Trumpchi GA3S

Overview
- Manufacturer: GAC Group
- Also called: GAC GA3S; Trumpchi GA3 (pre-facelift); Gonow E Mei (Emei); Gonow GA (launched as E Mei)
- Production: 2013–2019
- Model years: 2013–2019
- Assembly: Guangzhou, China

Body and chassis
- Class: Compact car (C)
- Body style: 4-door sedan
- Layout: Front-engine, front-wheel-drive
- Related: Trumpchi GS3; Trumpchi GS4

Powertrain
- Engine: Gasoline: 1.6 L 4B16K1 I4
- Transmission: 5-speed manual; 4-speed automatic

Dimensions
- Wheelbase: 2,598 mm (102.3 in)
- Length: 4,570 mm (179.9 in)
- Width: 1,750 mm (68.9 in)
- Height: 1,490 mm (58.7 in)
- Curb weight: 1,235 kg (2,723 lb)

The Trumpchi GA3S or previously the Trumpchi GA3 is a compact sedan produced by GAC Group under the Trumpchi brand in China and the GAC Motor brand globally.

== Overview ==
The Trumpchi GA3 is based on the same platform as the later developed Trumpchi GS3 crossover, positioning it under the Trumpchi GA5 sedan. Originally introduced as the Trumpchi GA3 sedan, it debuted on the 2013 Shanghai Auto Show and was launched on the Chinese car market soon after in July 2013 with prices ranging from 80,000 to 120,000 yuan. The design of the Trumpchi GA3 is inspired by the Guangzhou Auto E-Jet concept car that debuted on the Guangzhou Auto Show in December 2012. Engine options of the GA3 includes a 1.4 liter turbo engine and a 1.6 liter engine.

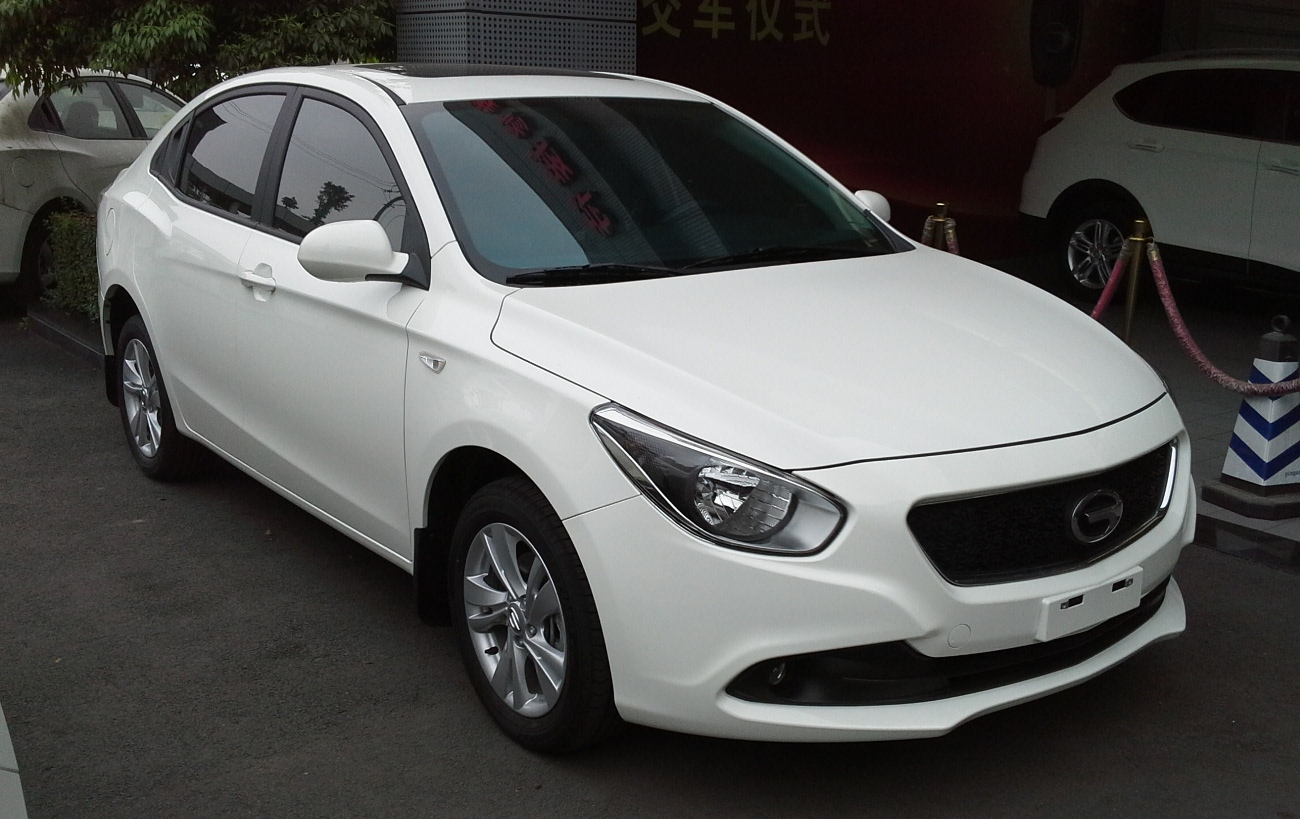
Trumpchi GA3 front

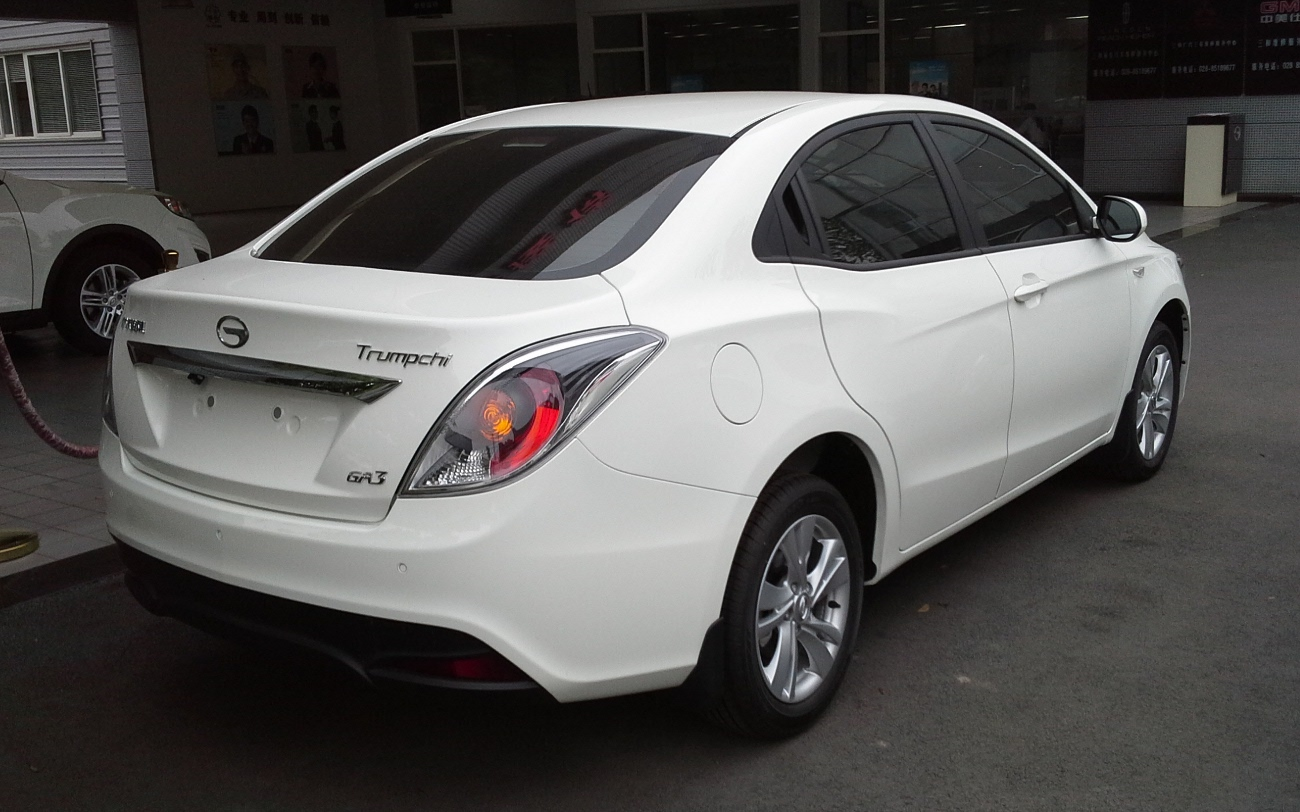
Trumpchi GA3 rear

A sportier variant named the Trumpchi GA3S was available as an option shortly after, and soon replaced the Trumpchi GA3 directly with the plug-in hybrid version dubbed the Trumpchi GA3S PHEV launched in 2016. Engines are the same as the regular GA3 sedan, a 1.6 liter engine with an output of 122hp, mated to a four-speed automatic transmission or a five-speed manual transmission.

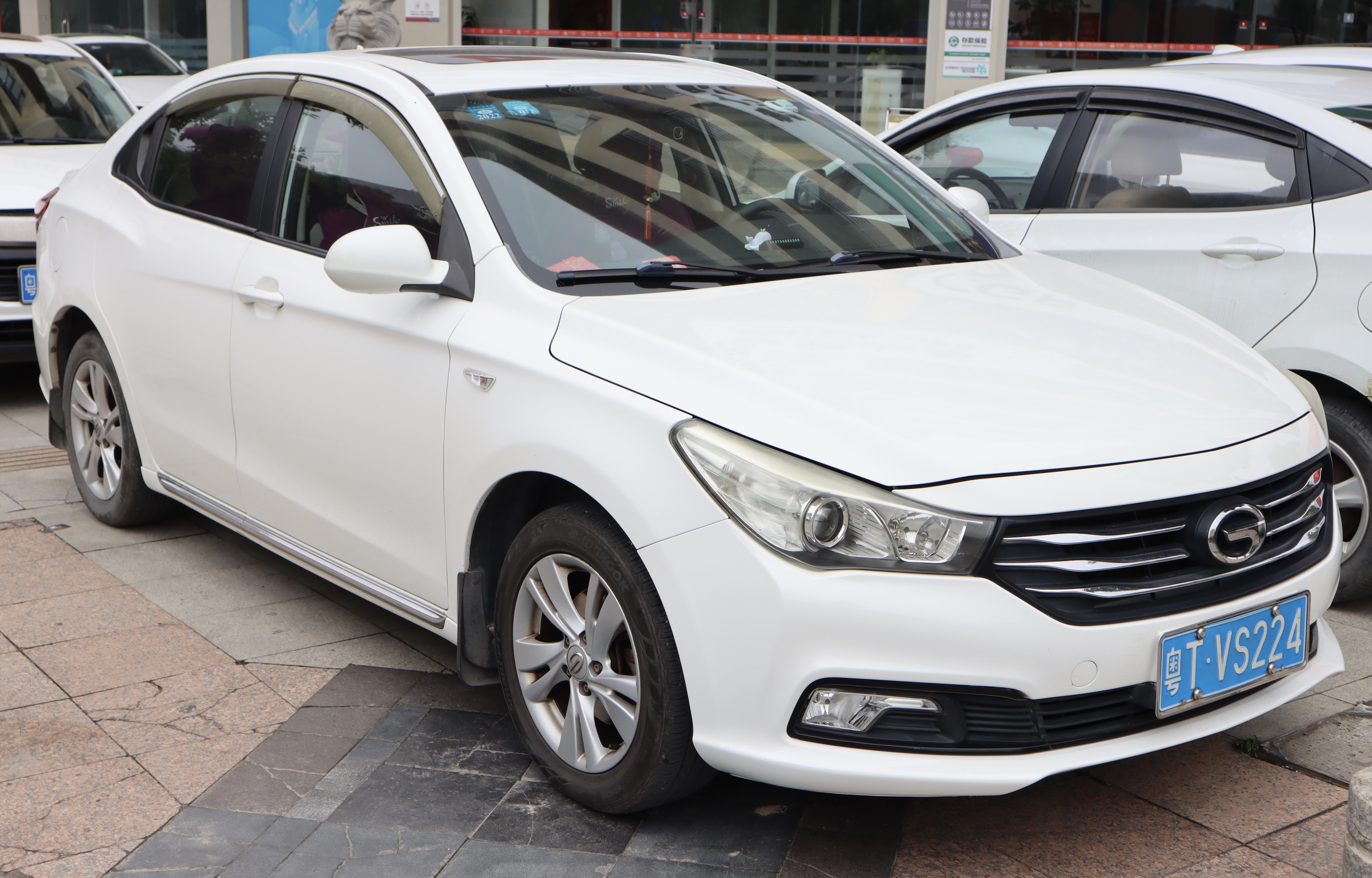
Trumpchi GA3S front

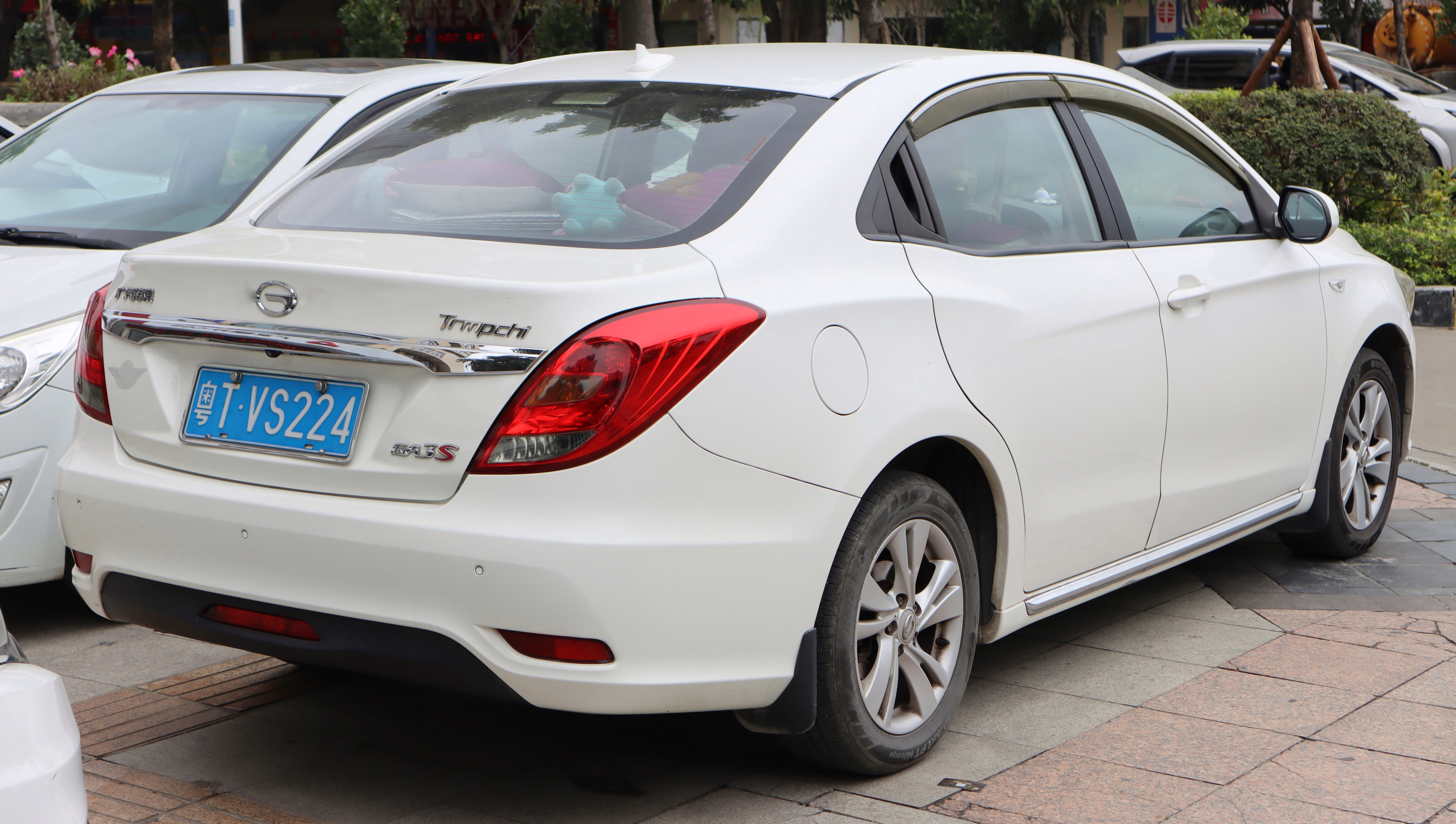
Trumpchi GA3S rear

== Gonow E Mei and Gonow GA ==
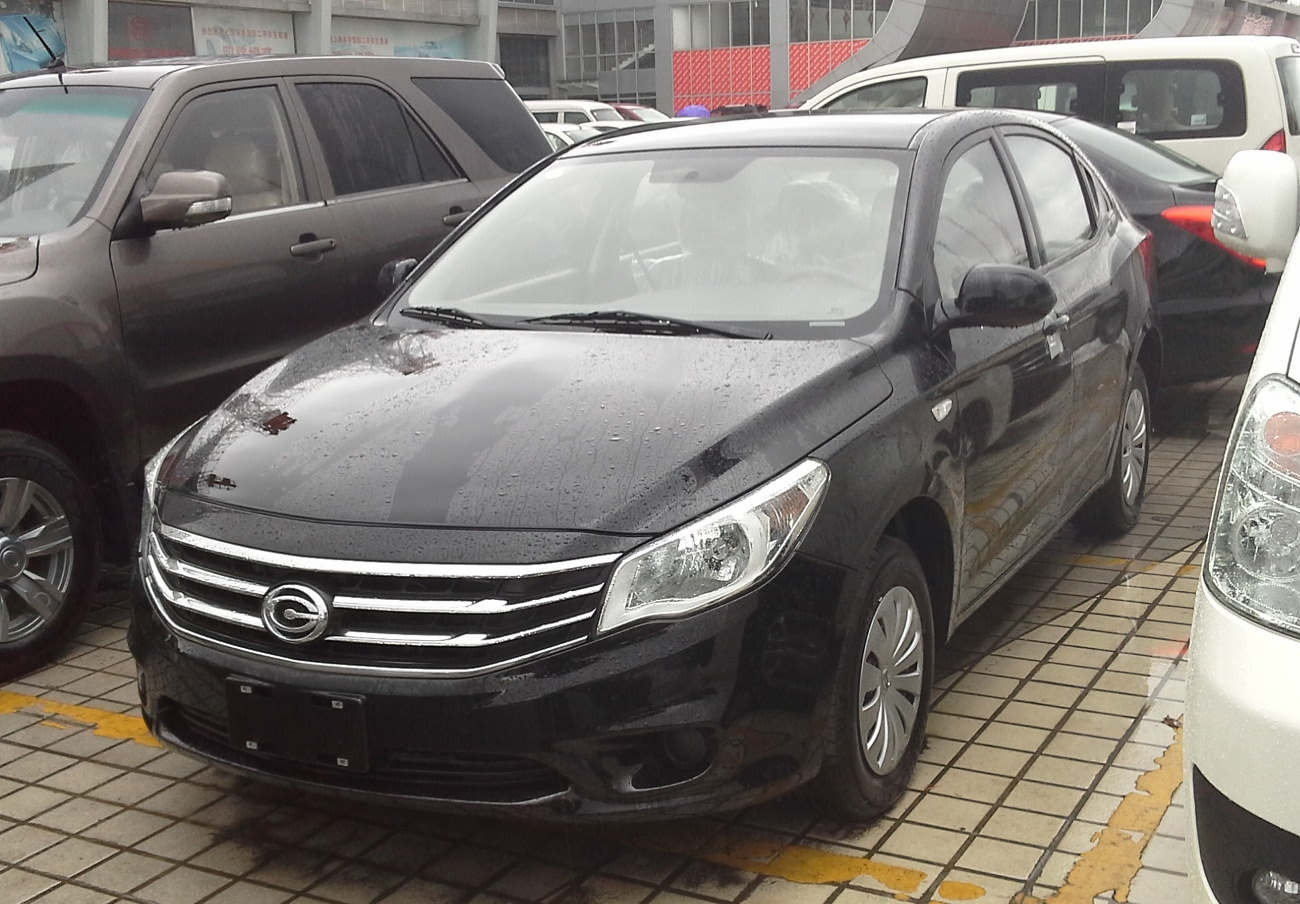
Gonow E mei in China

The Trumpchi GA3 was originally the Gonow E Mei launched in 2014 and sold under the Gonow sub-brand of Guangzhou Automobile before being discontinued and rebadged as a Trumpchi product. Prices starts from 69,800 yuan to 96,800 yuan. The Gonow E Mei was also formerly known as the Gonow GA during development phase.

== See also ==
- List of GAC vehicles
