= Inokom =

Malaysian automotive company

Inokom Corporation Sdn. Bhd.
- Type: Subsidiary
- Industry: Automotive
- Founded: October 1992
- Headquarters: Kulim, Kedah, Malaysia
- Area served: Malaysia, Thailand, Philippines
- Products: Automobiles
- Parent: Sime Darby Motors (51%); Sime Darby Hyundai (5%); Hyundai Motor Company (15%); Bermaz Auto (29%)
- Website: www.inokom.com.my

Inokom Corporation Sdn. Bhd., doing business as Inokom, is a subsidiary of Malaysian-based Sime Darby Motors. Inokom is the licensed contract assembler for Hyundai, Kia, BMW and Mazda passenger vehicles in Malaysia.

Inokom was incorporated in October 1992 through a joint venture between companies from Malaysia, France and South Korea. In 1998, Inokom's shareholders included the Berjaya Group (35%), Royal Malaysian Police Cooperative subsidiary Pesumals (30%), Renault (15%), Hyundai Motor Company (15%) and Hyumal Motor (5%).

== History ==
Inokom launched its first product, the Inokom Permas in 1998. The Permas is based on the first generation Renault Trafic, and was produced in various configurations at Inokom's new plant in Kulim, Kedah. In May 2000, Inokom launched its second product, the Inokom Lorimas, a license-built Hyundai Porter. Inokom's first non-commercial product, the Hyundai-based Inokom Atos was launched in 2002.

In 2004, Sime Darby acquired a 51% stake in Inokom, and by the 2010s, Hyundai assembly operations in Malaysia were centralised at the Inokom plant. Prior to the consolidation, Hyundai models were assembled at two separate plants, namely the Inokom plant in Kulim and the Oriental Assemblers plant in Tampoi.

Inokom's acquisition by Sime Darby also led to the assembly of BMW M and Land Rover models at the Inokom plant in 2008. BMW M and Land Rover vehicles were previously assembled at the Associated Motor Industries plant in Shah Alam, which shut down in 2007. Mazda assembly at Inokom commenced in 2011 under a separate initiative by the Berjaya Group. Inokom has also carried out contract assembly for Dongfeng, Jinbei and Ford commercial vehicles.

Presently, Inokom's shareholders include Sime Darby Motors (51%), Sime Darby Hyundai (5%), Hyundai Motor Company (15%) and Bermaz Auto (29%).

Inokom was previously known as Industri Otomotif Komersial (Malaysia) Sdn. Bhd. between 1992 and 2002. The company changed its name to Inokom Corporation Sdn. Bhd. in November 2002.

== Lineup of Inokom branded vehicles ==
=== Former passenger vehicles ===
- Inokom i10, a version of Hyundai's i10 city car launched on the Malaysian market in August 2008 with a 1.1 litre Epsilon engine. Produced by Inokom in their Kulim, Kedah plant.
- Inokom Santa Fe, launched in Malaysia in August 2007. A version of Hyundai's Santa Fe with a choice of 2.2 litre Diesel engine or 2.7 litre petrol engines.
- Inokom Atos, began production in 2002. In May 2005, the Atos Prima was introduced as a facelift on an earlier generation Hyundai Atos with a frontal redesign similar to Hyundai's Atos Prime.
- Inokom Getz, available as a 3 or 5 door hatchback with 1.4 litre engine mated to a manual or automatic transmission. This is a version of the 2006 facelifted Hyundai Getz.
- Inokom Matrix, locally produced since Sept 2004, this is a version of the pre 2009 facelift Hyundai Lavita family car.

=== Former commercial vehicles ===
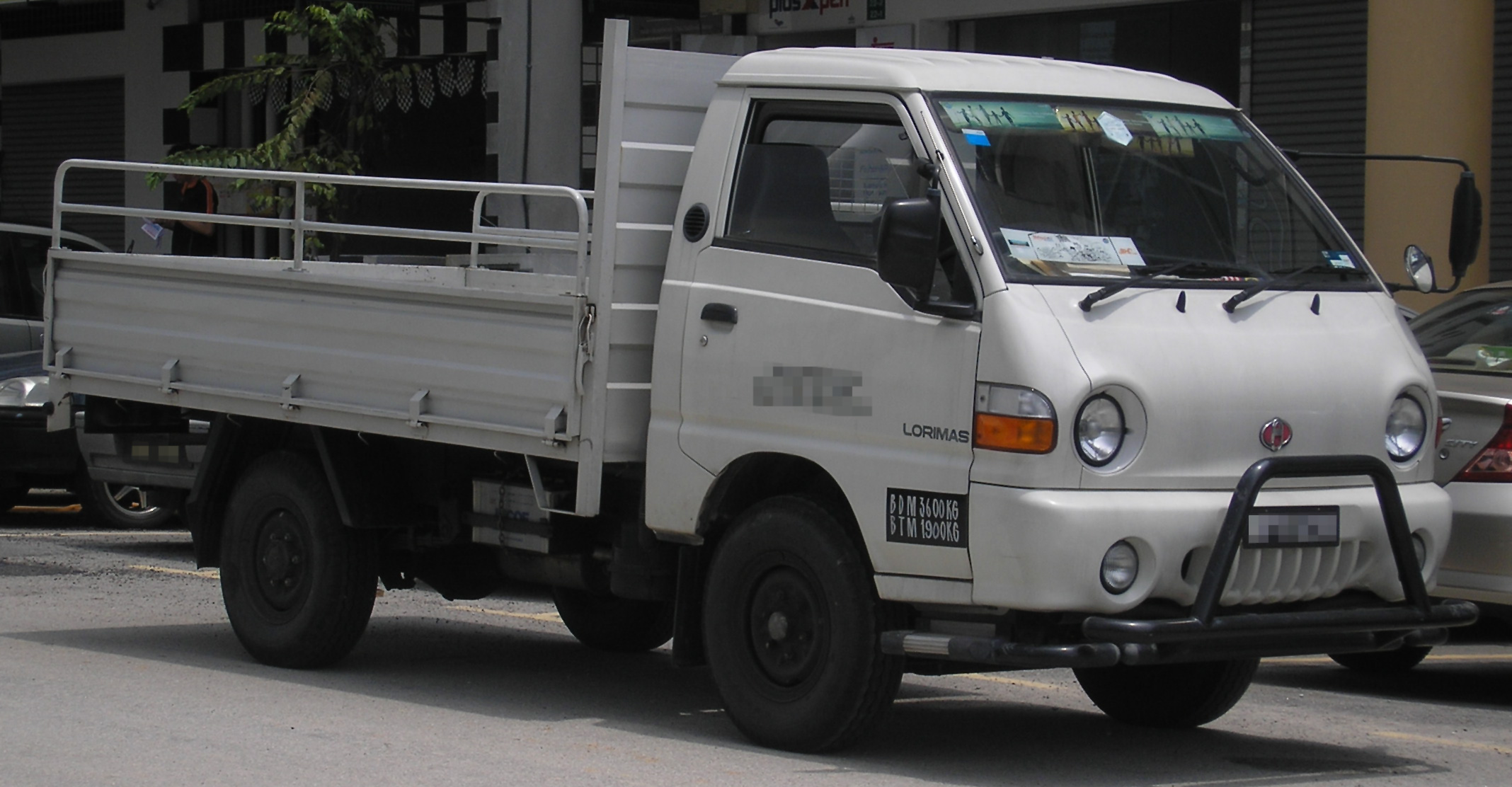
Inokom Lorimas

- Inokom Lorimas, a version of the Hyundai Porter launched in 2002, produced for the local market and also for export. Exported to Chile from 2004 and to the Philippines from 2007.
- Inokom Permas, a version of the Renault Trafic as introduced in the early eighties.
- Inokom HD5000, a version of the Hyundai Mighty II.

== Contract assembly ==
=== BMW ===
==== Current models ====
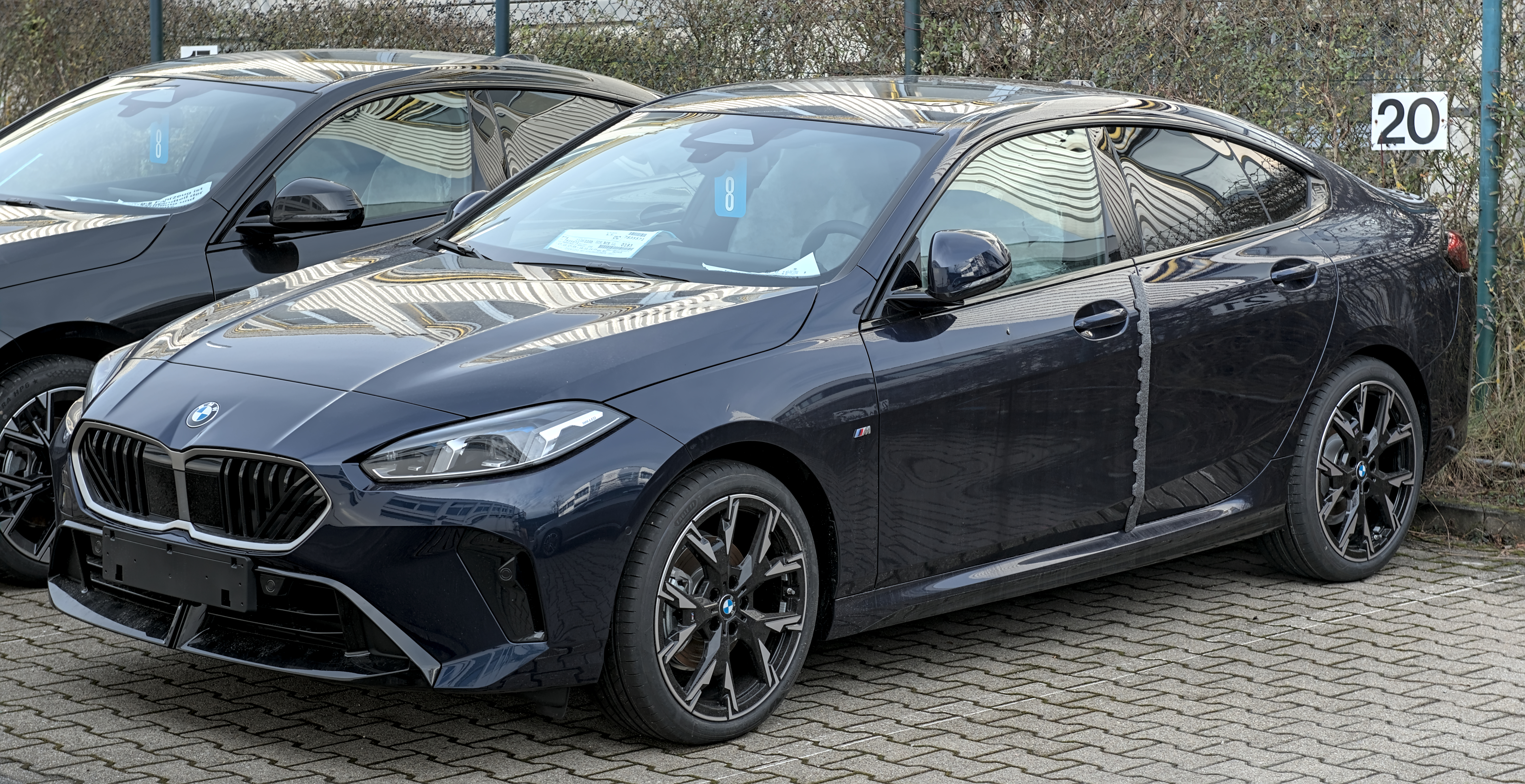
BMW 2 Series (F74)

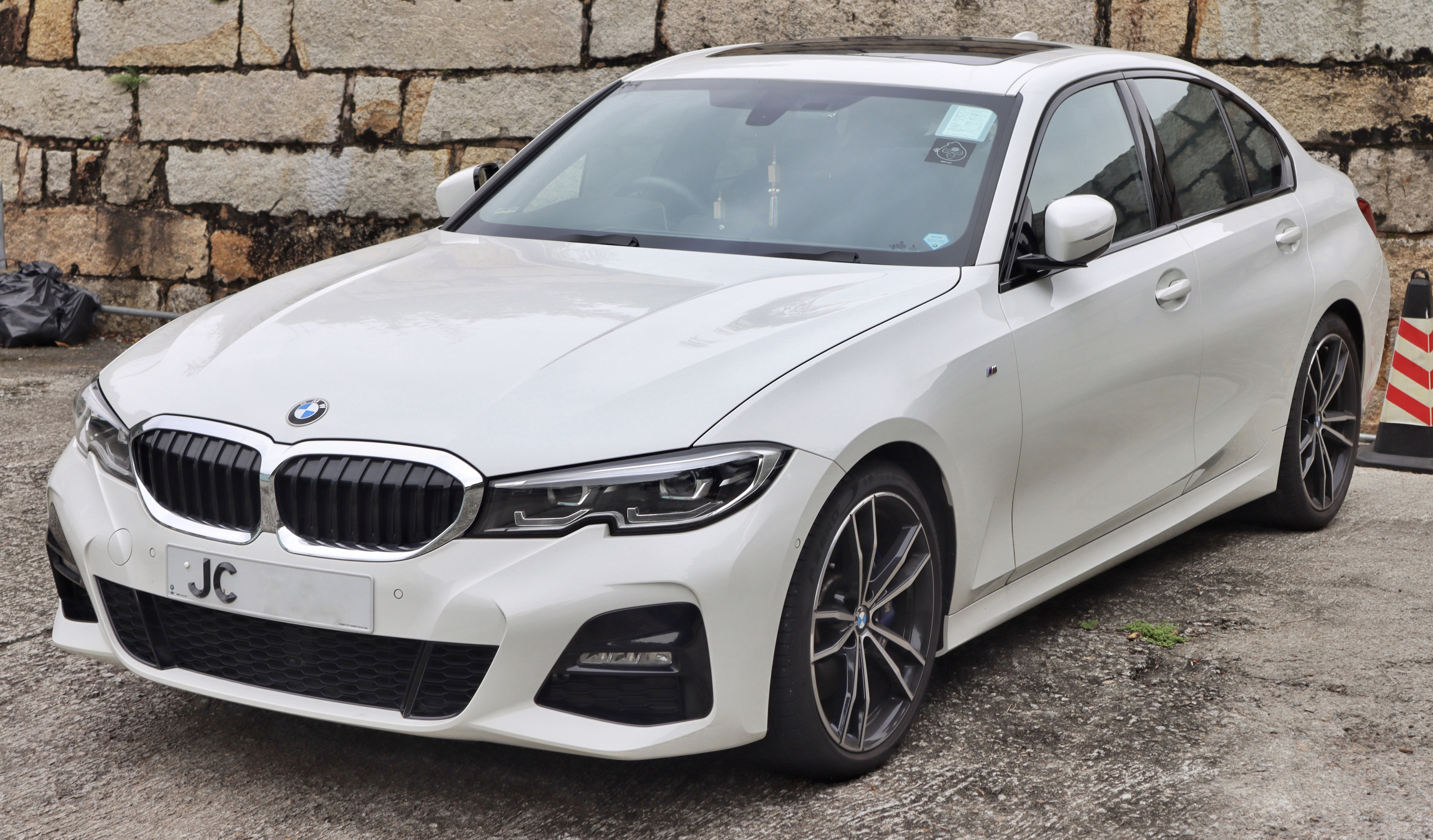
BMW 3 Series (G20)

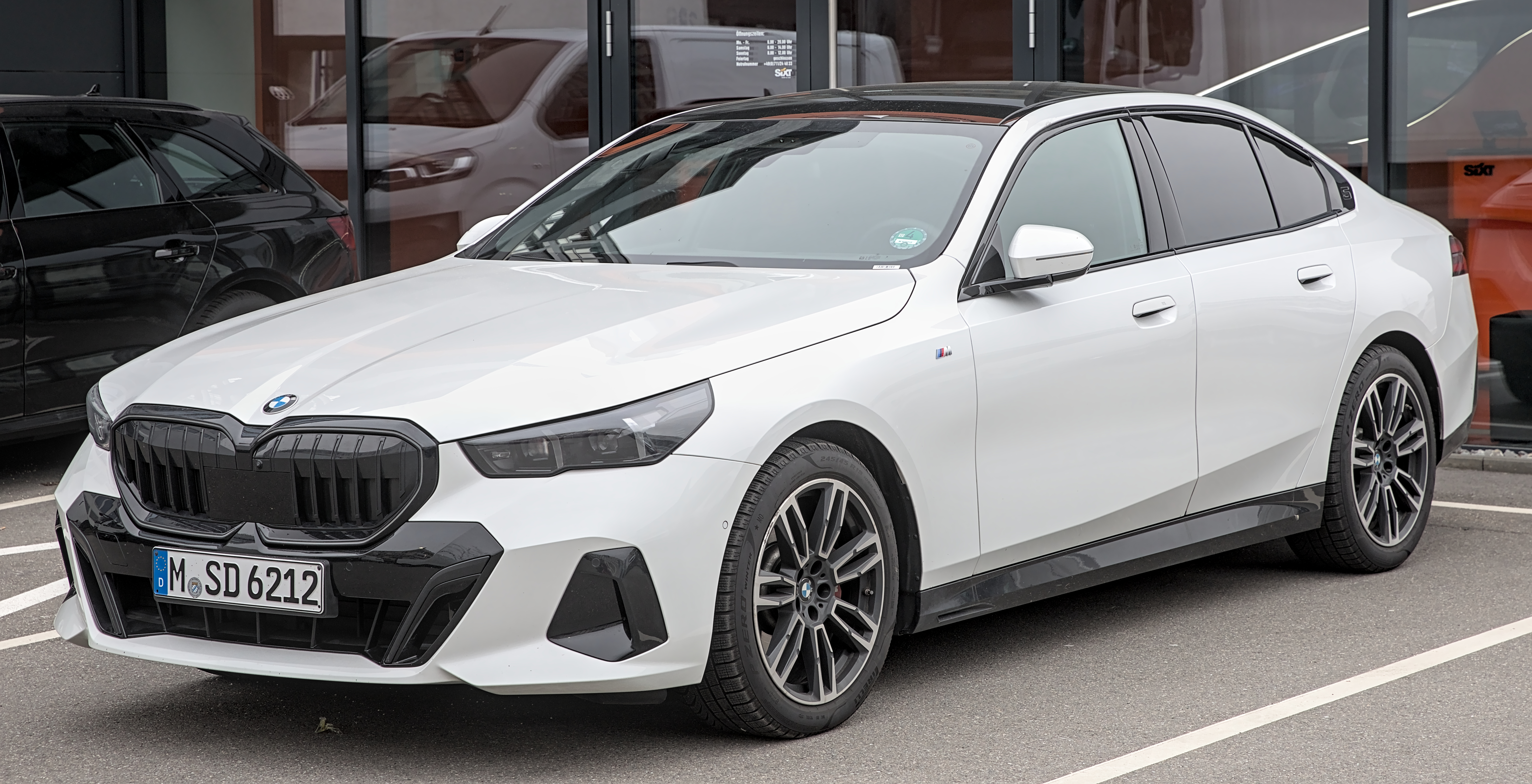
BMW 5 Series (G60)

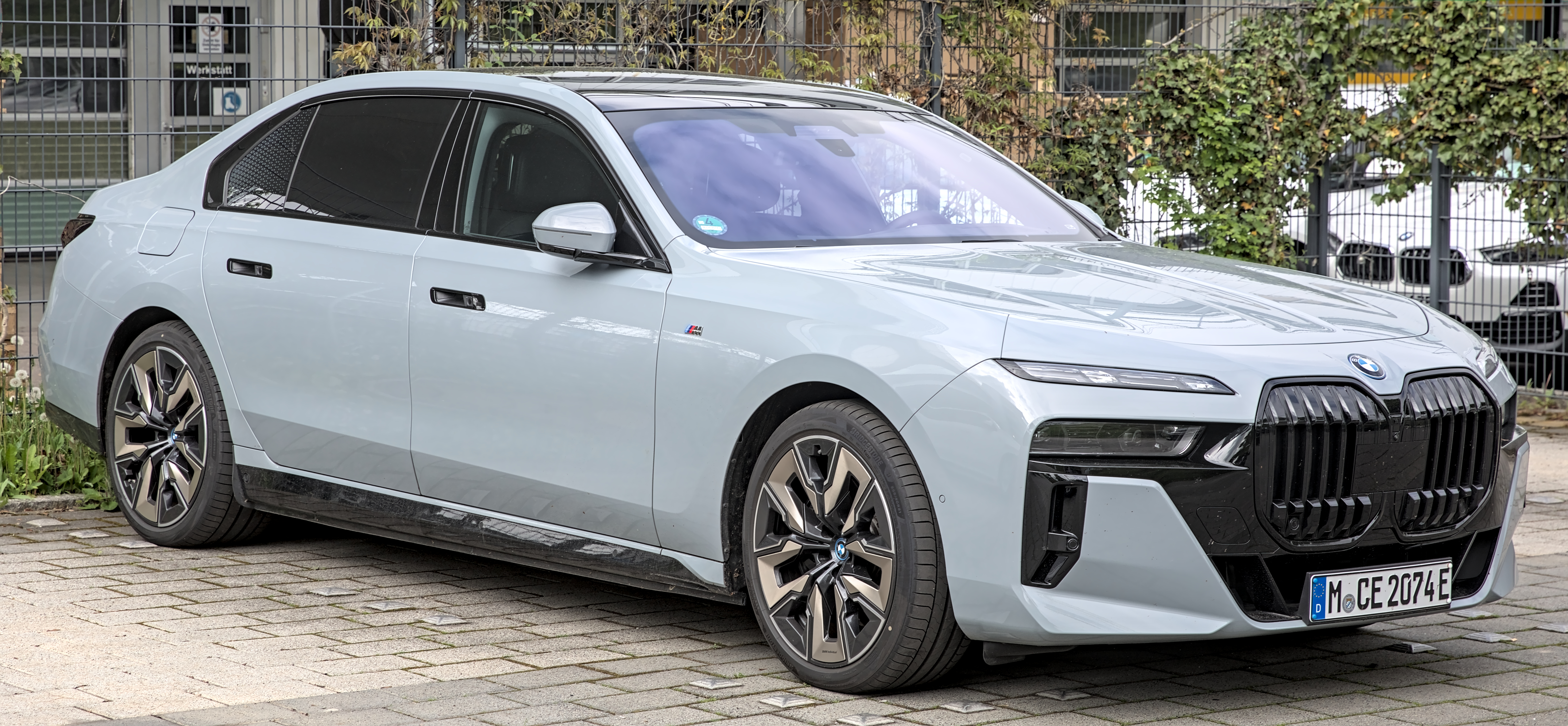
BMW 7 Series (G70)

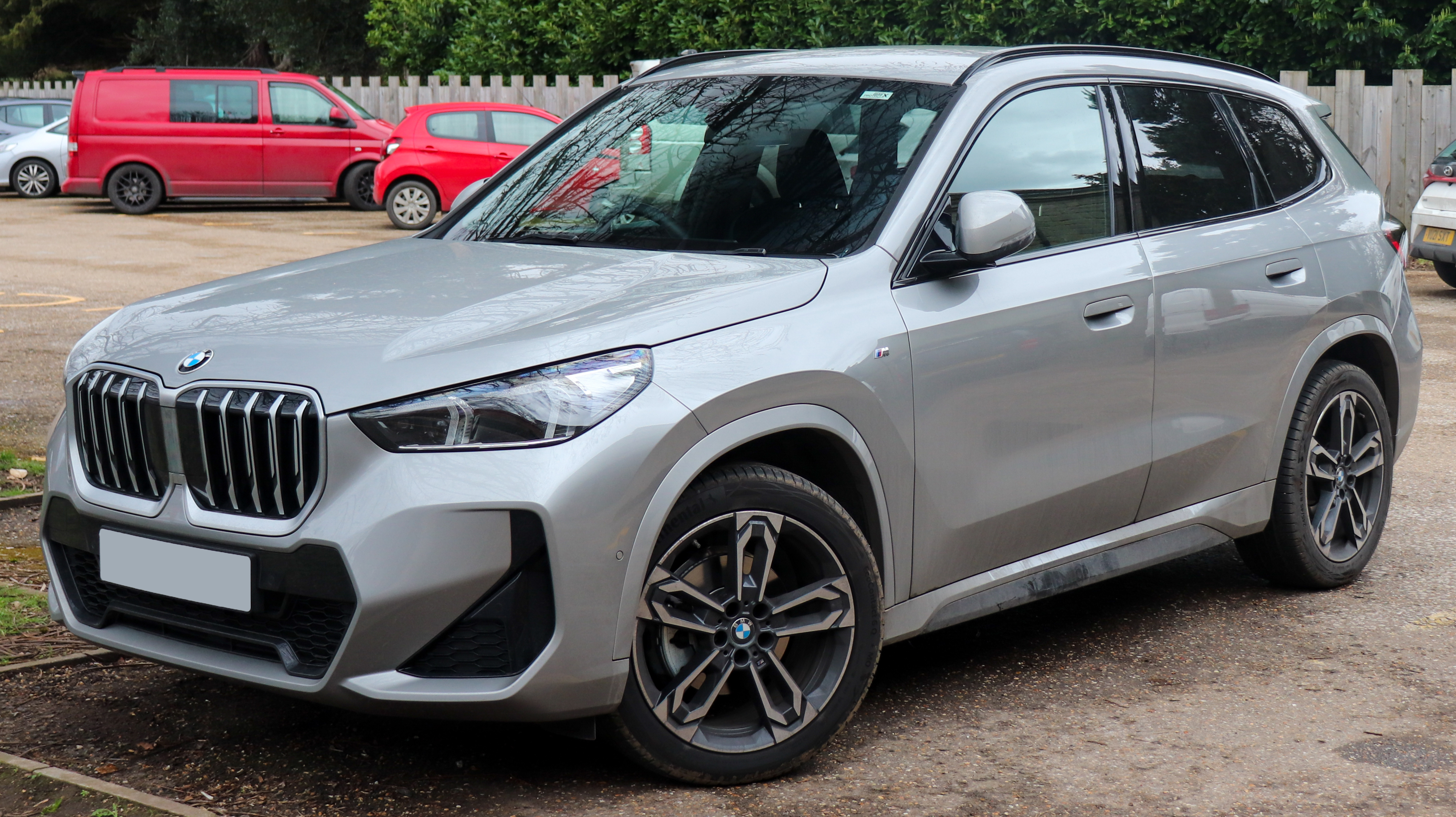
BMW X1 (U11)

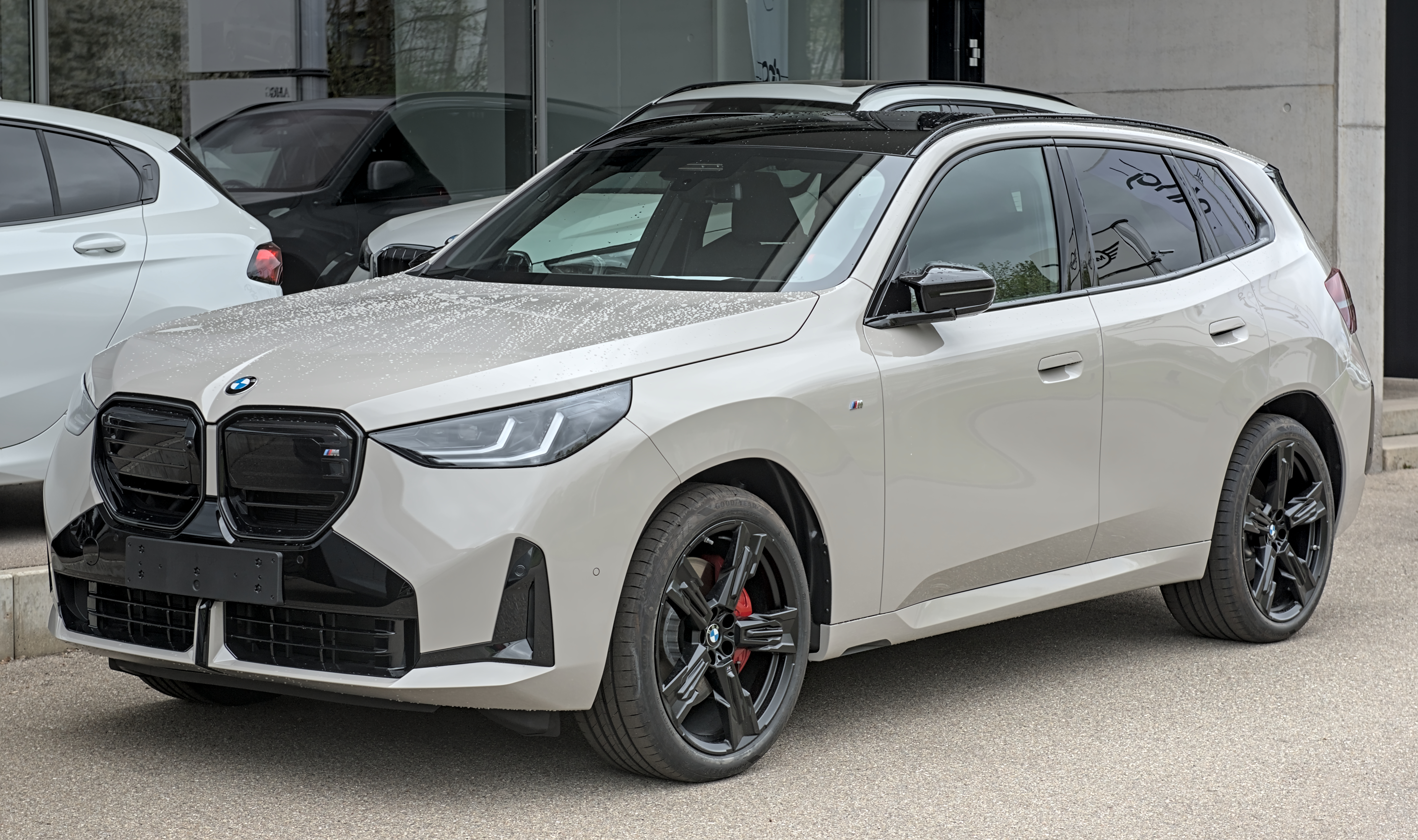
BMW X3 (G45)

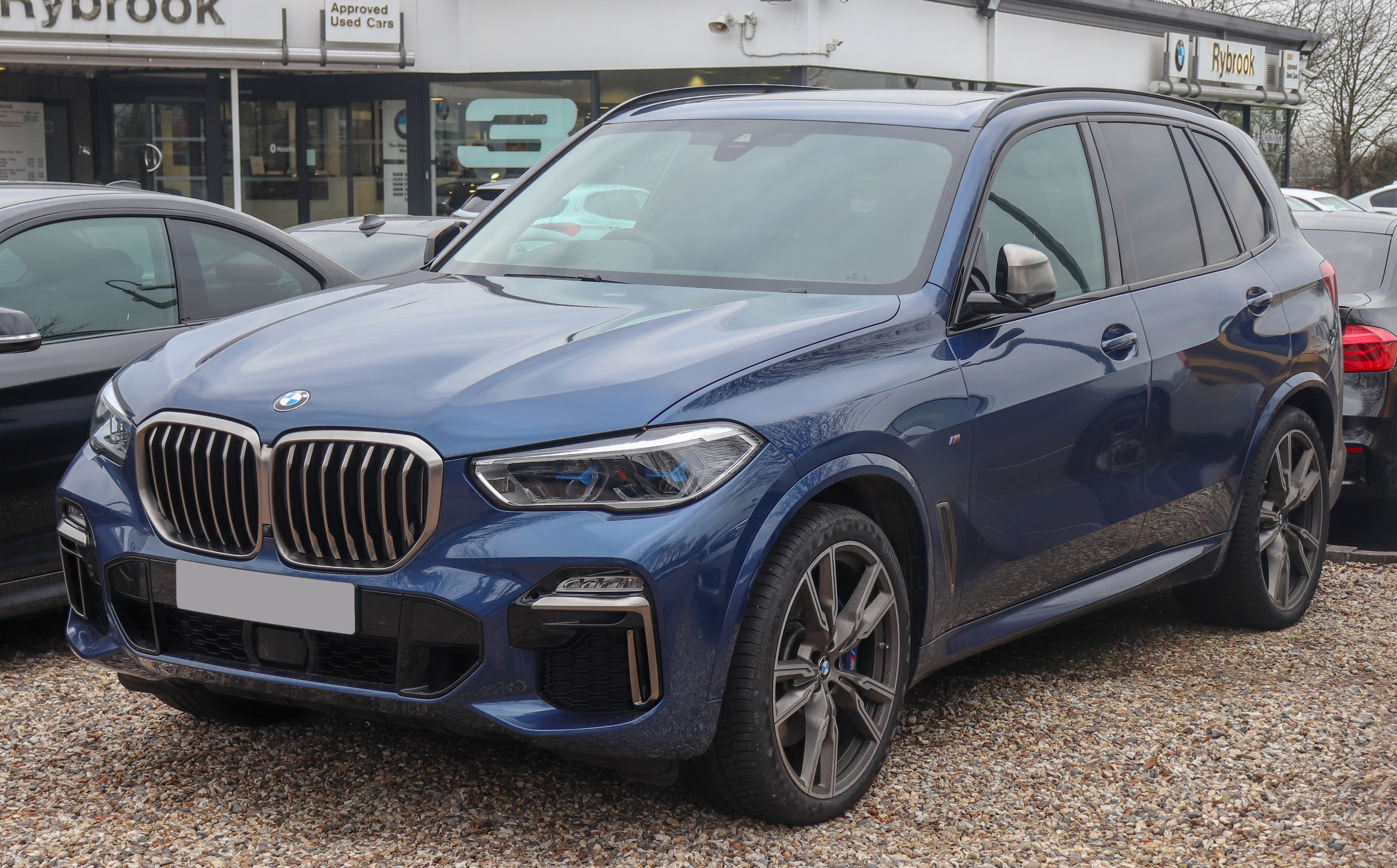
BMW X5 (G05)

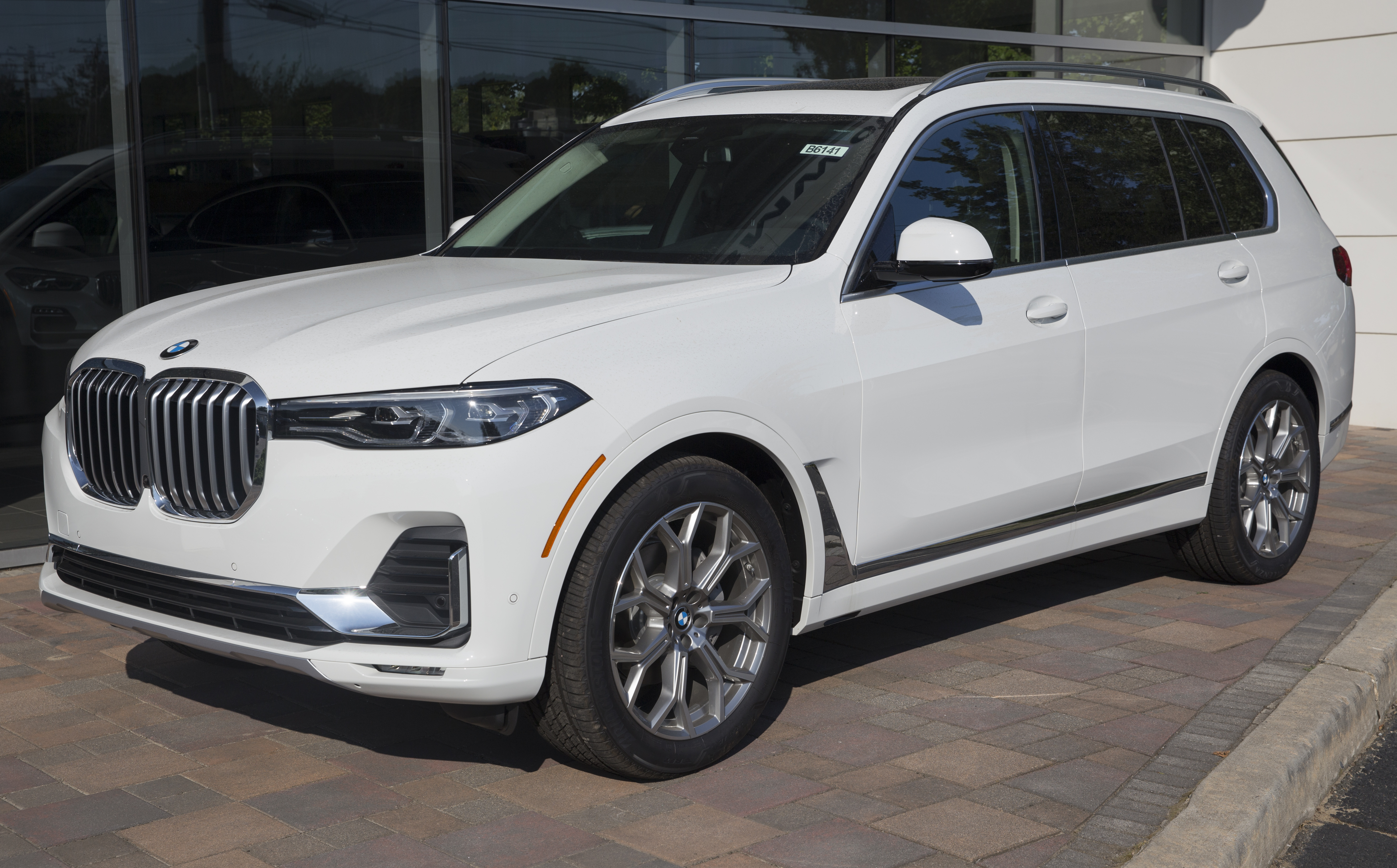
BMW X7 (G07)

==== Former models ====
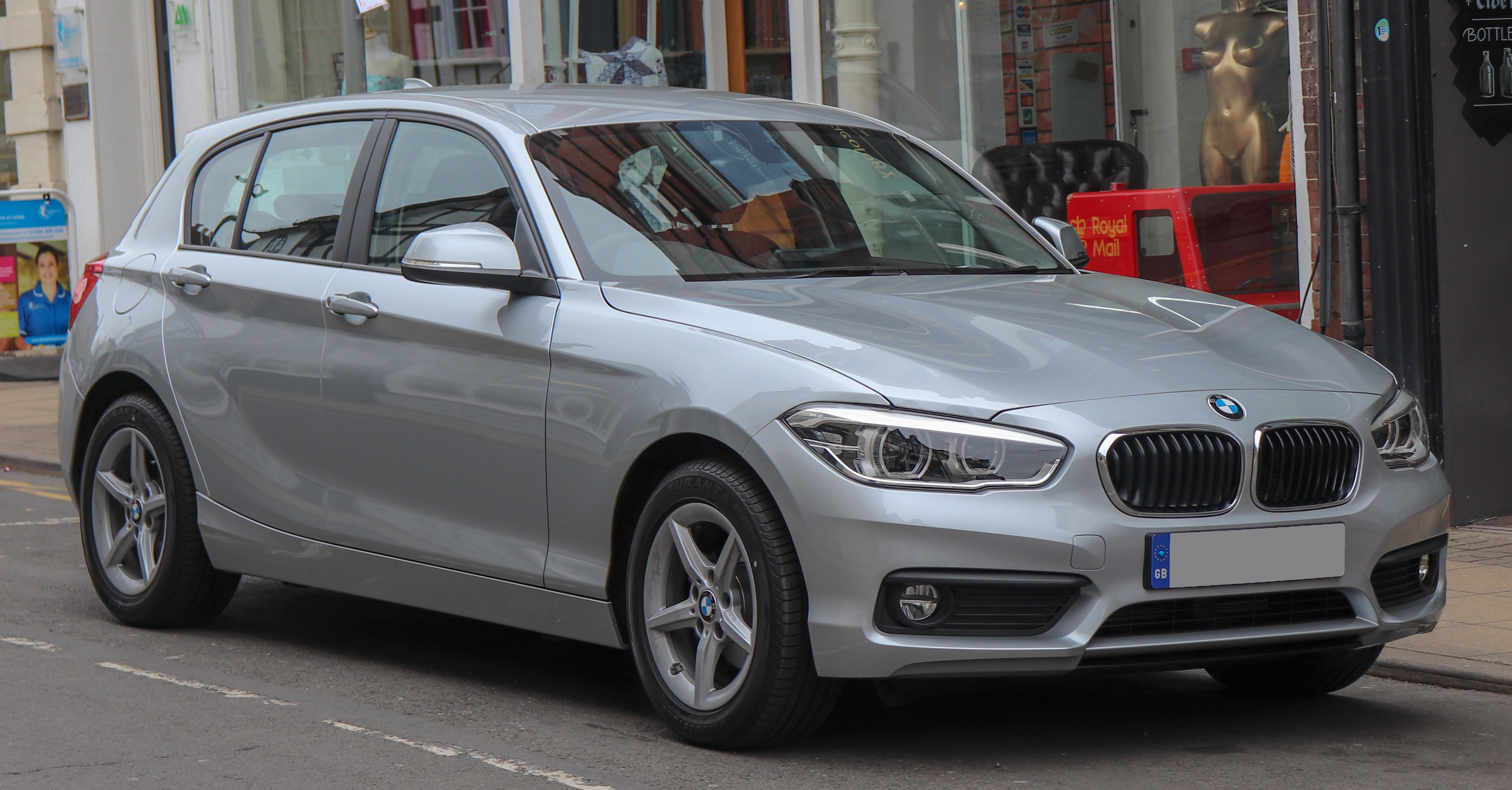
BMW 1 Series (F20)

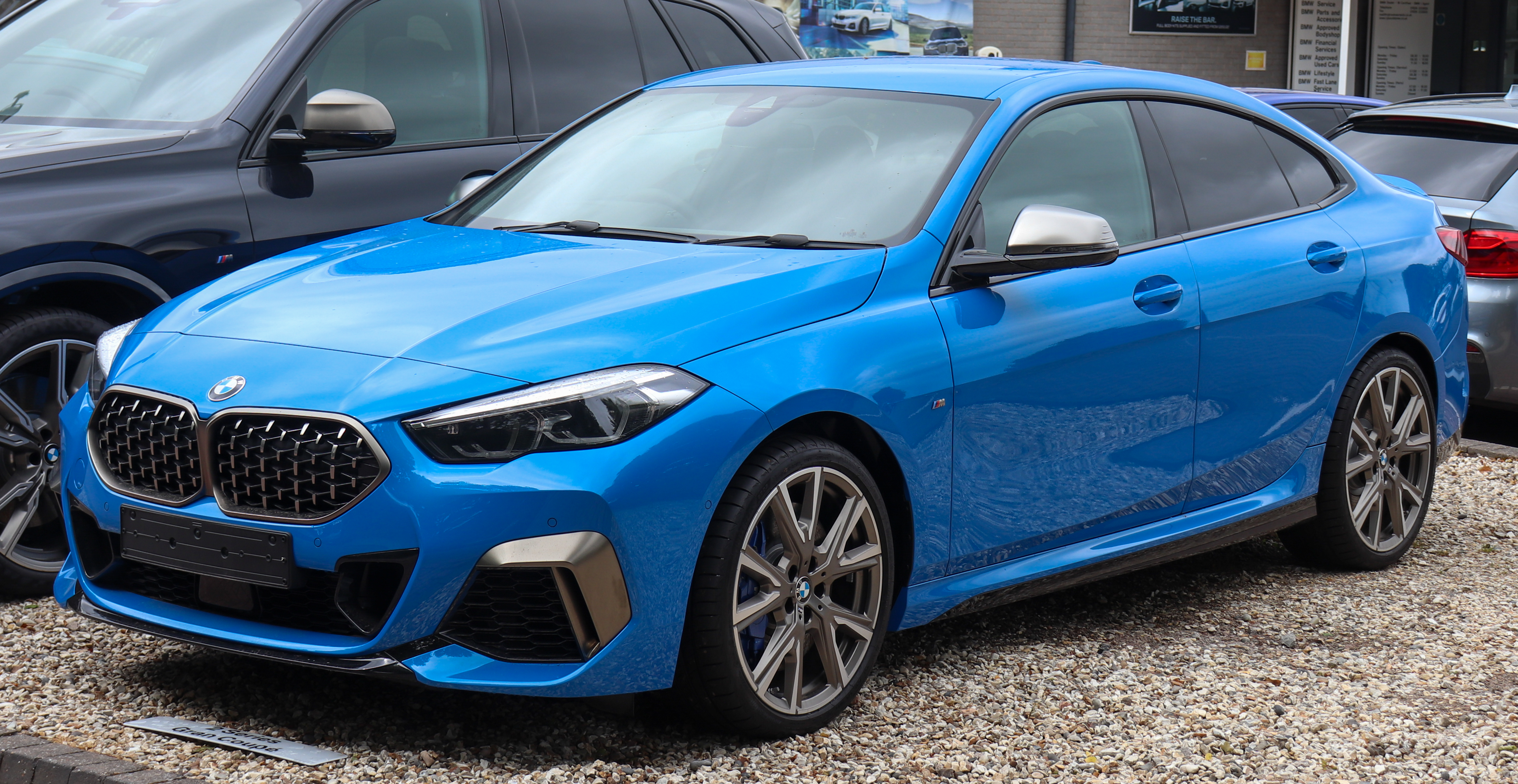
BMW 2 Series (F44)

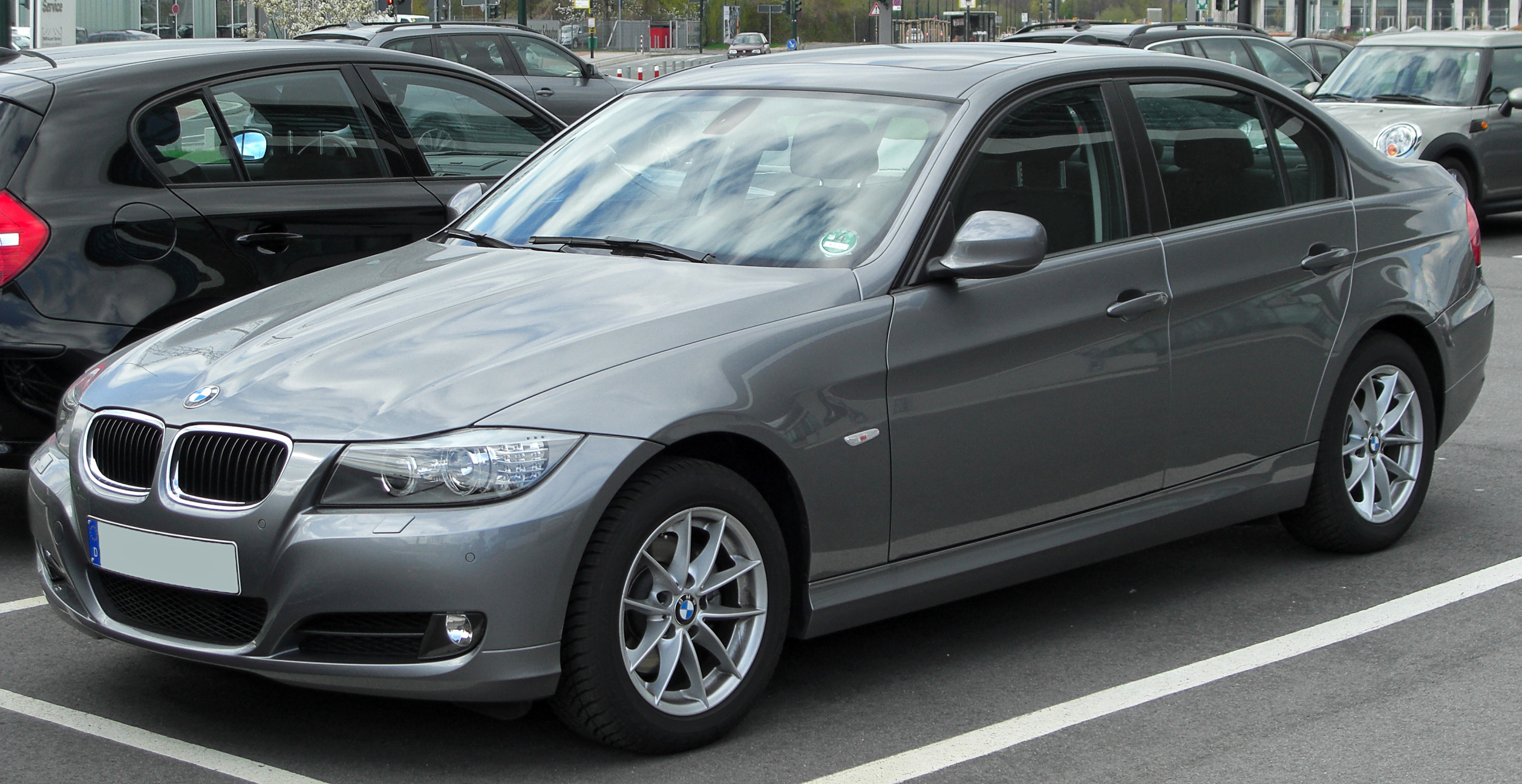
BMW 3 Series (E90)

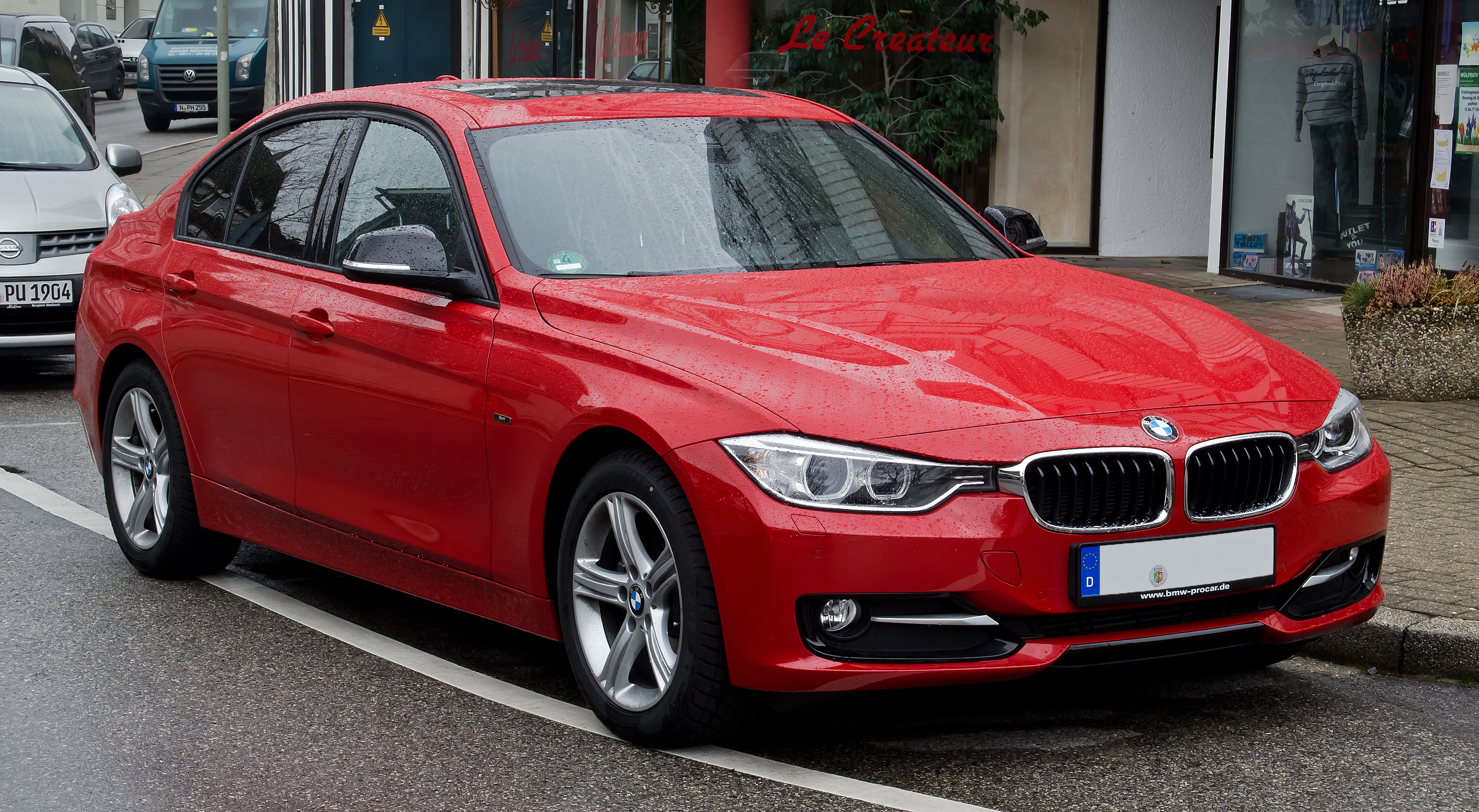
BMW 3 Series (F30)

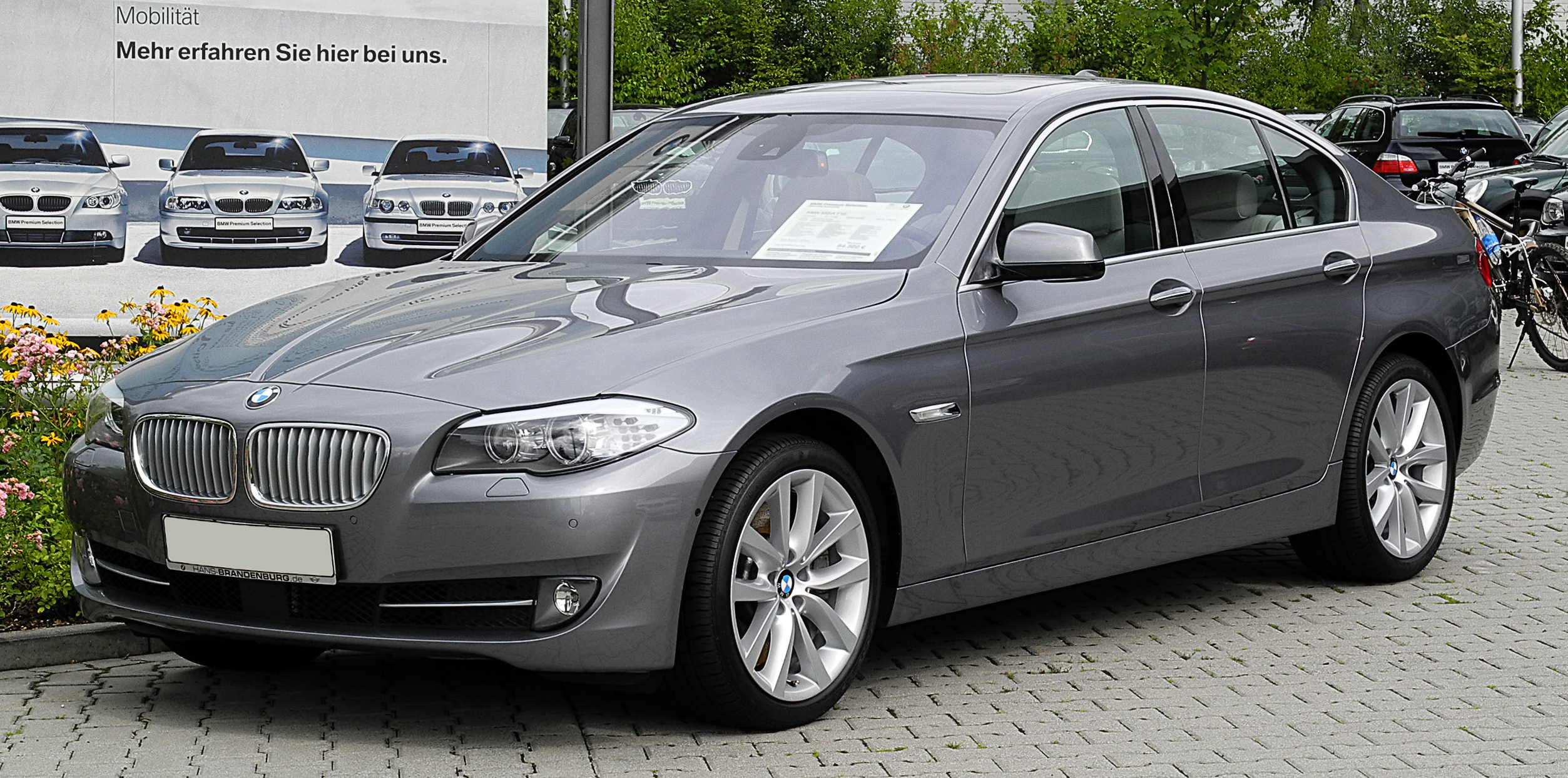
BMW 5 Series (F10)

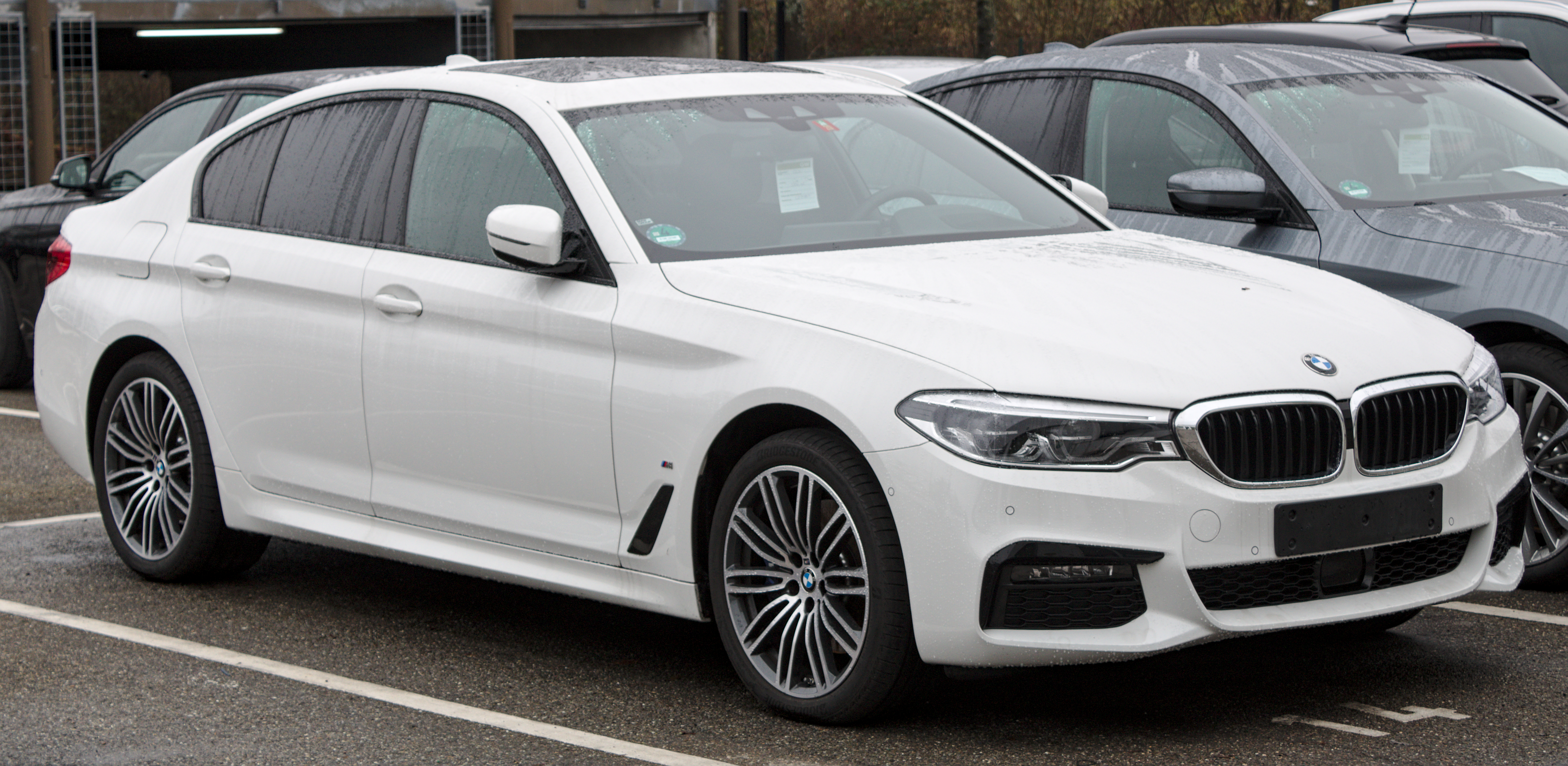
BMW 5 Series (G30)

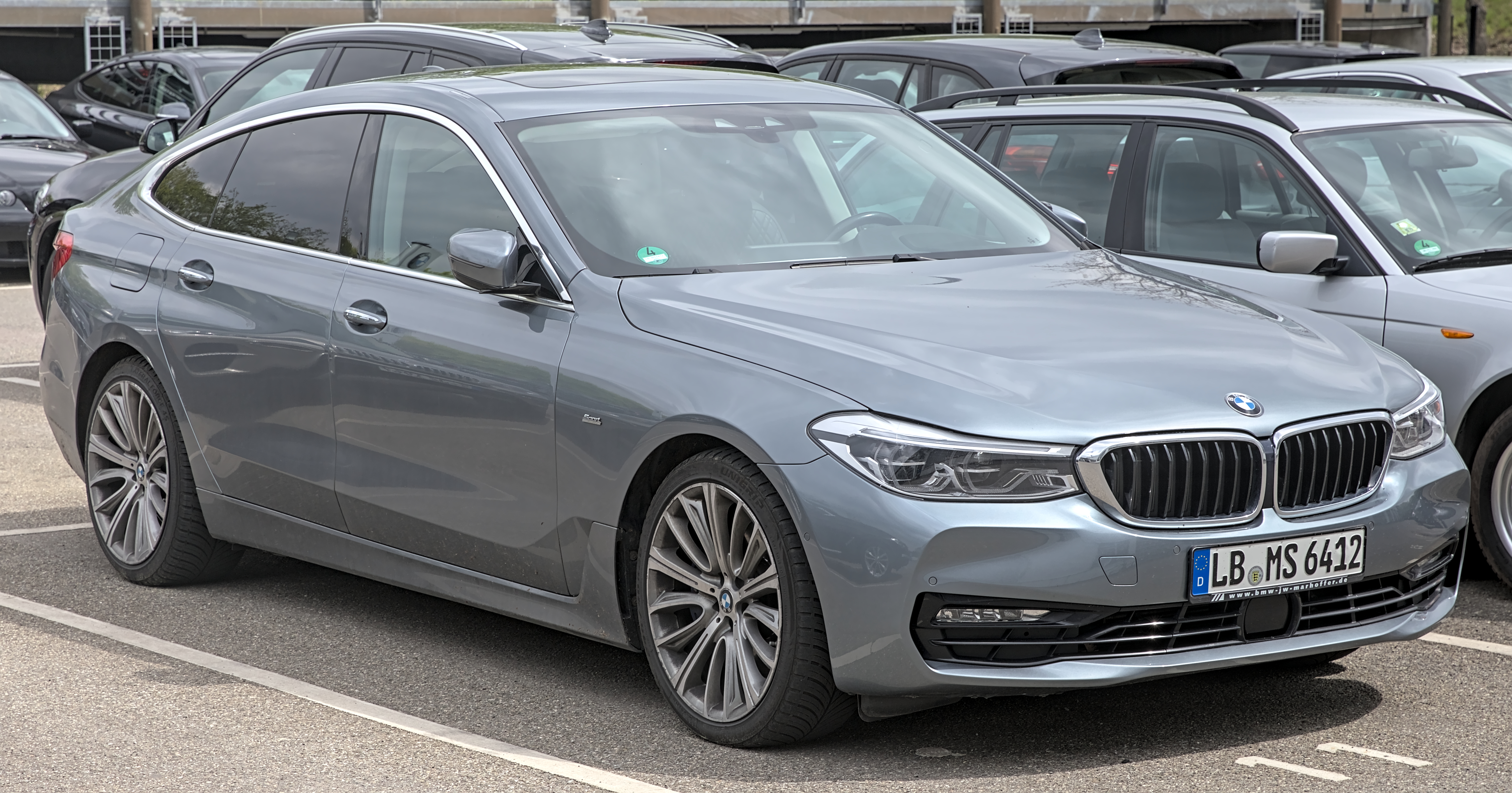
BMW 6 Series (G32)

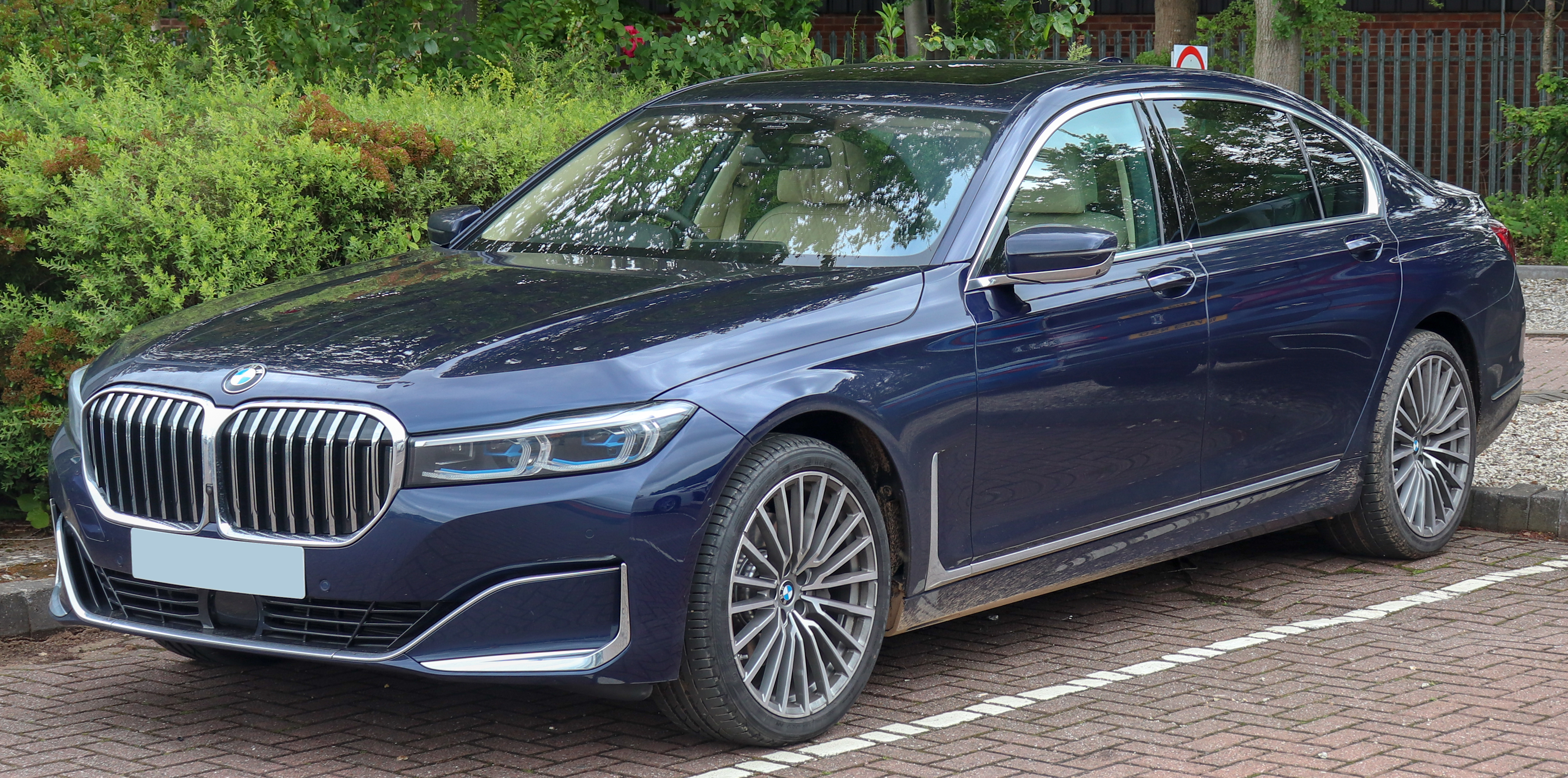
BMW 7 Series (G12)

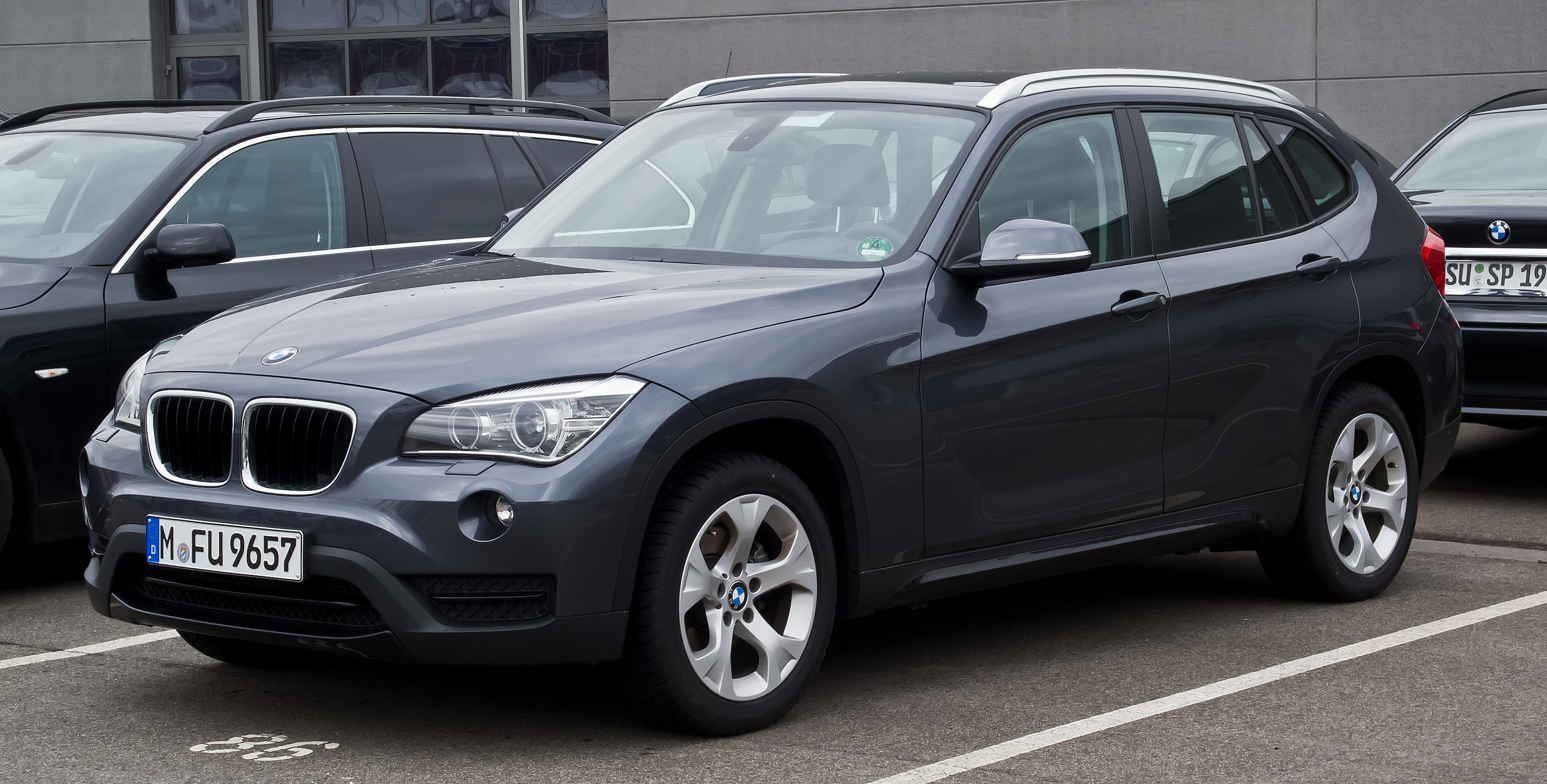
BMW X1 (E84)

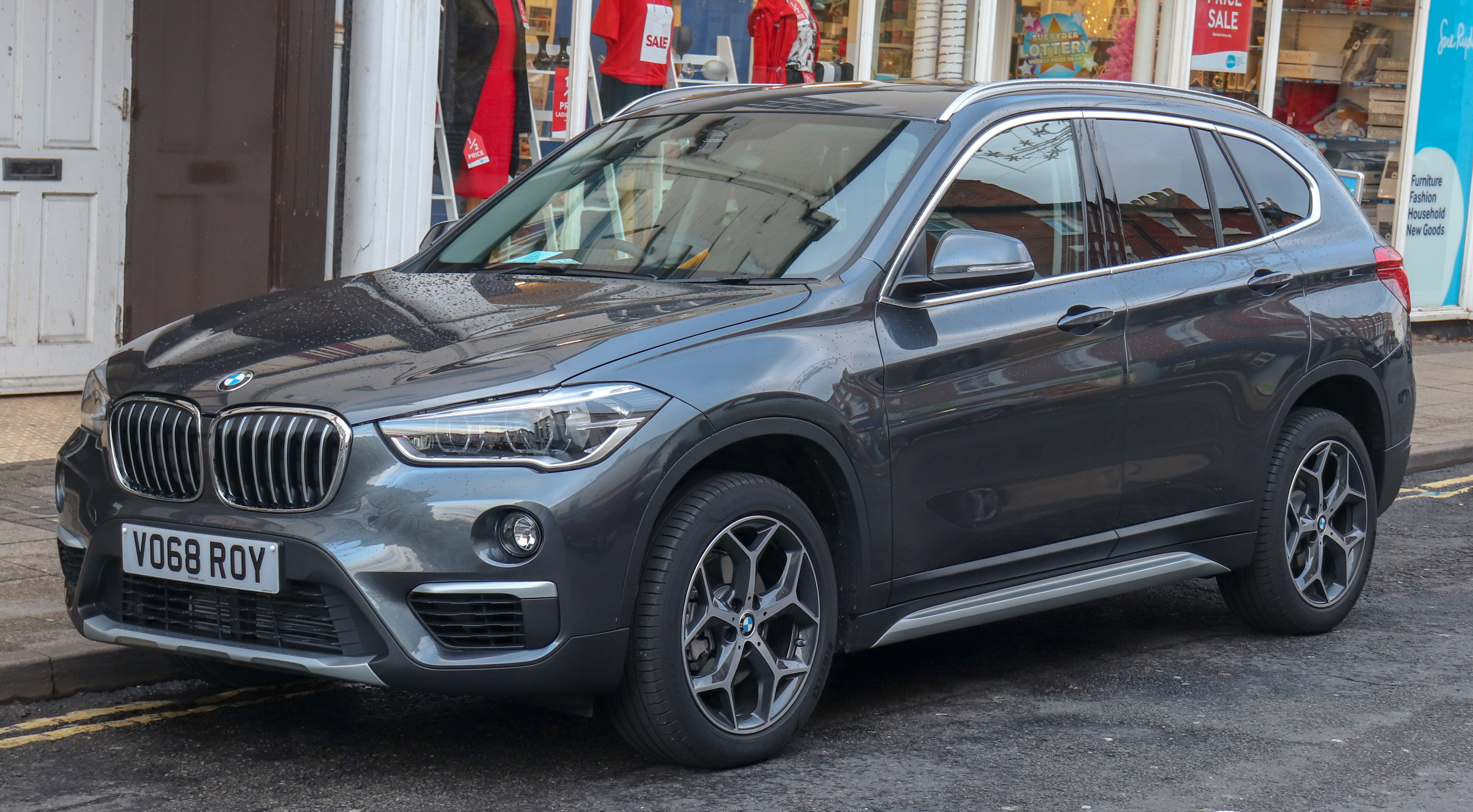
BMW X1 (F48)

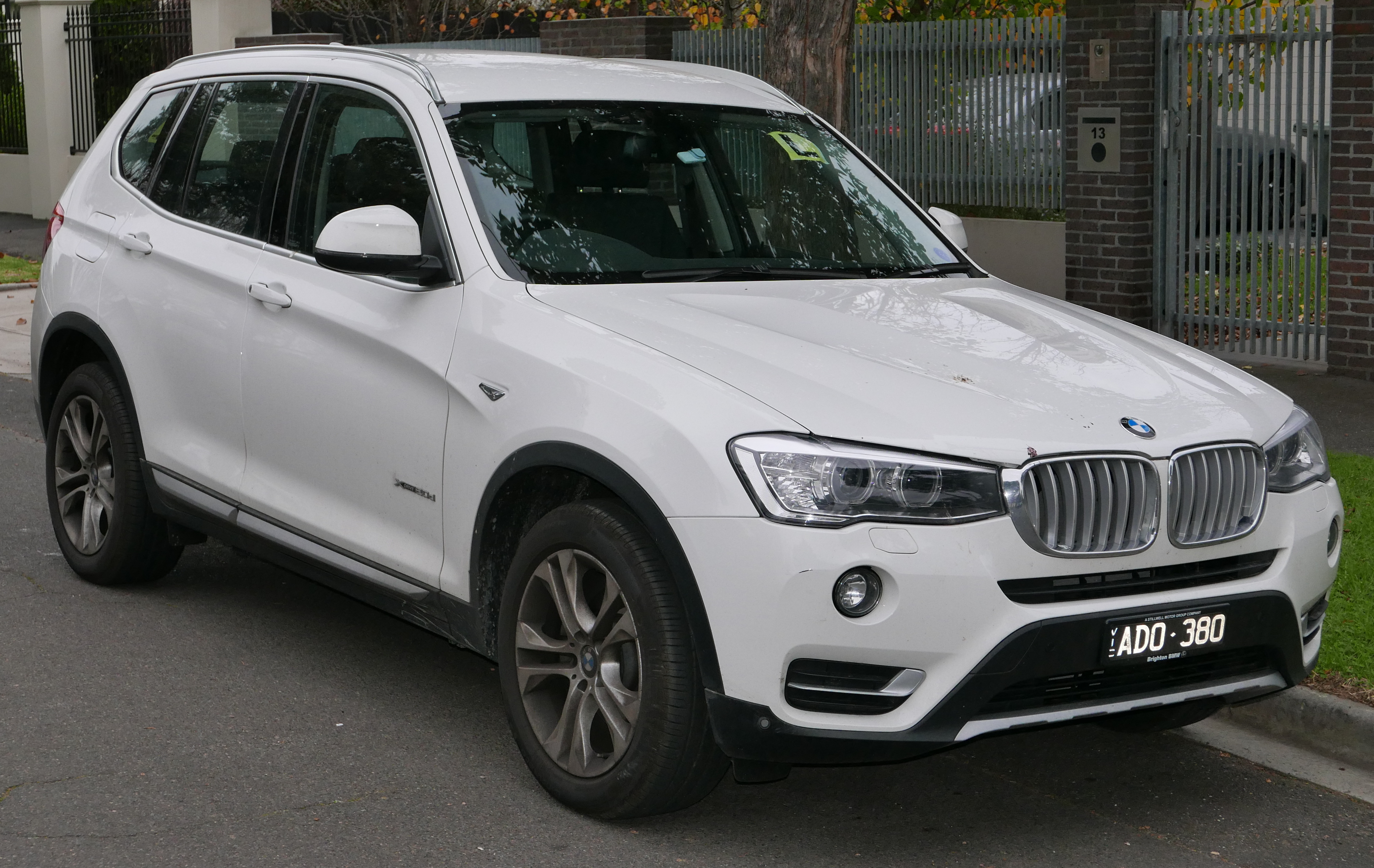
BMW X3 (F25)

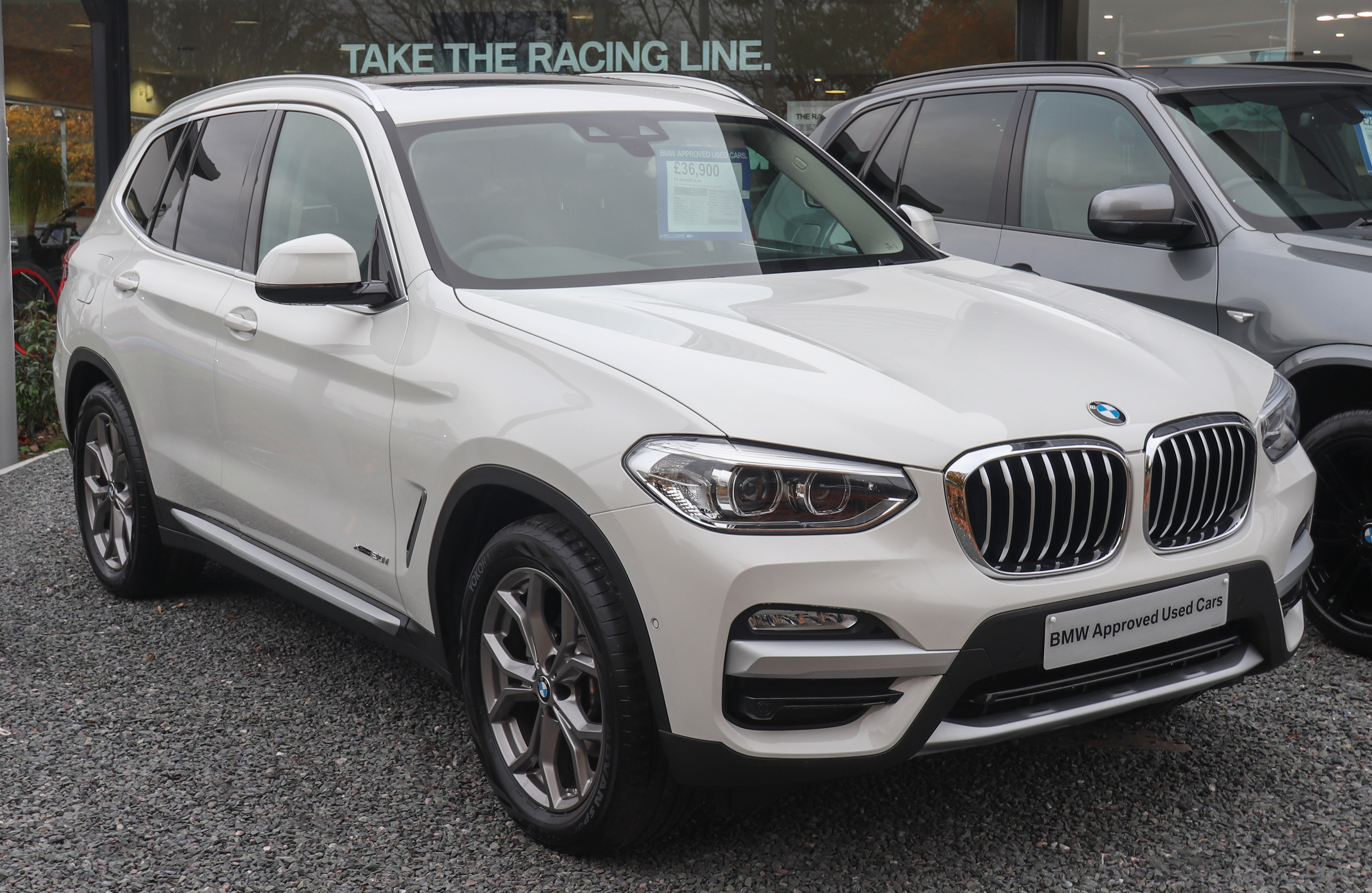
BMW X3 (G01)

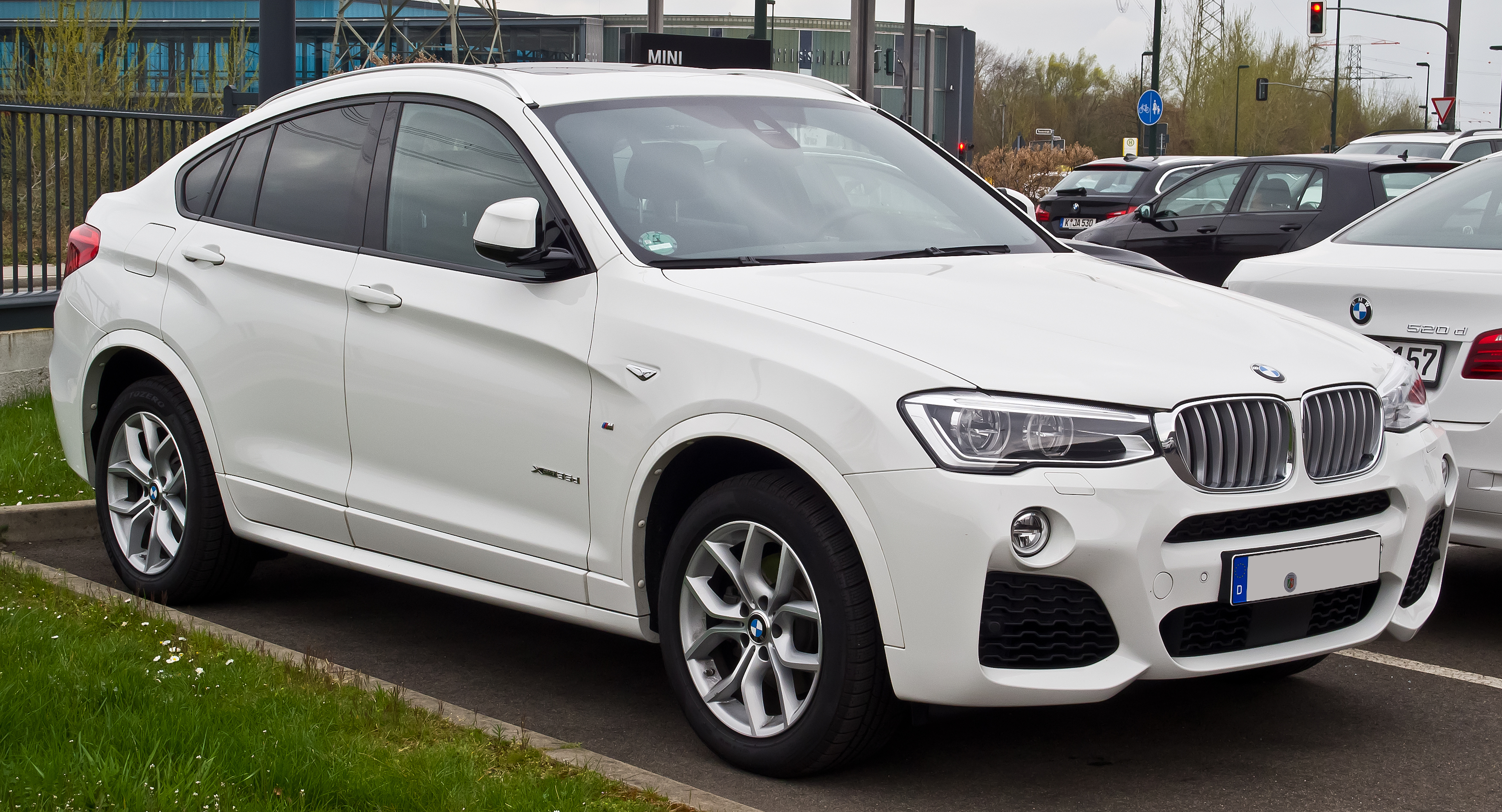
BMW X4 (F26)

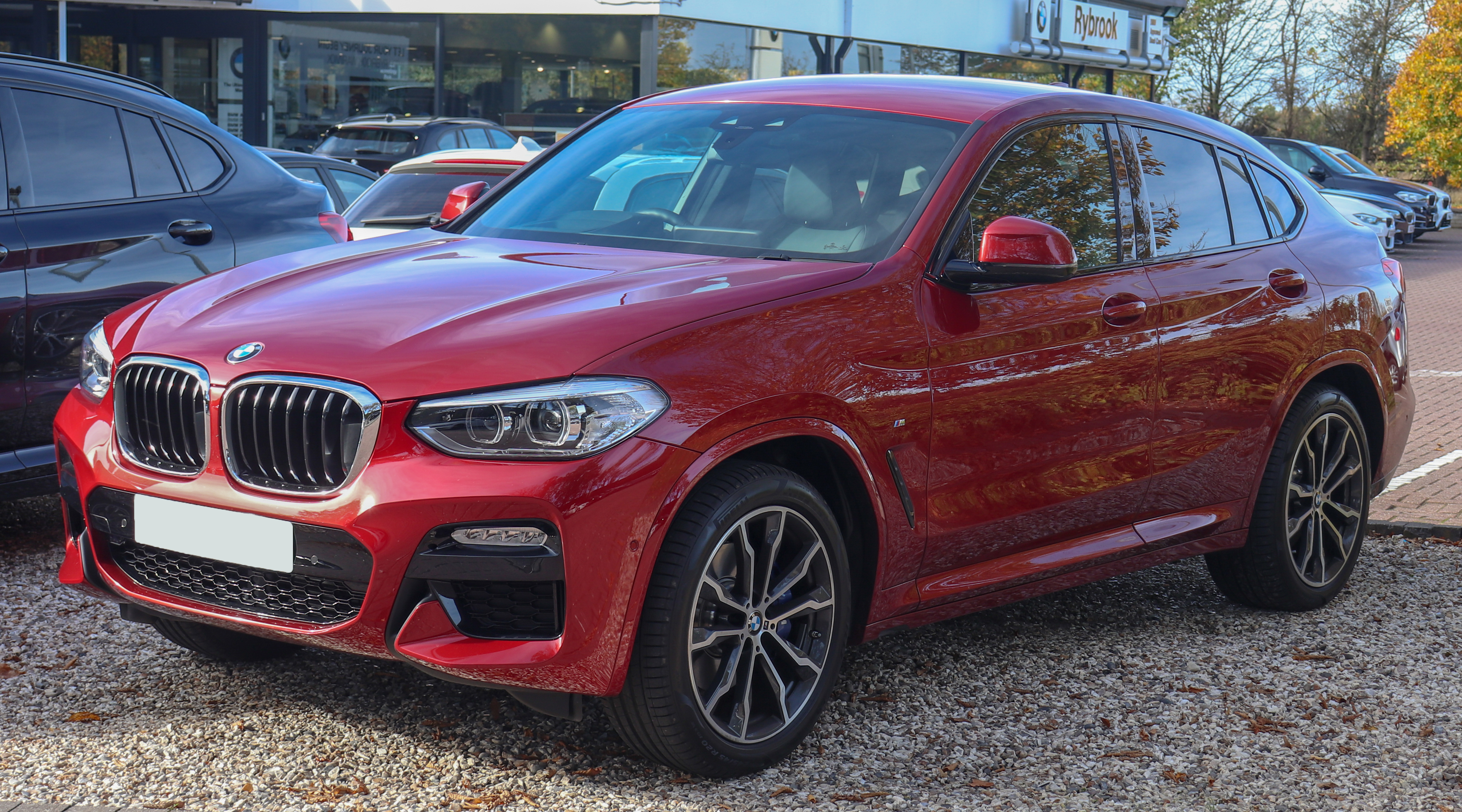
BMW X4 (G02)

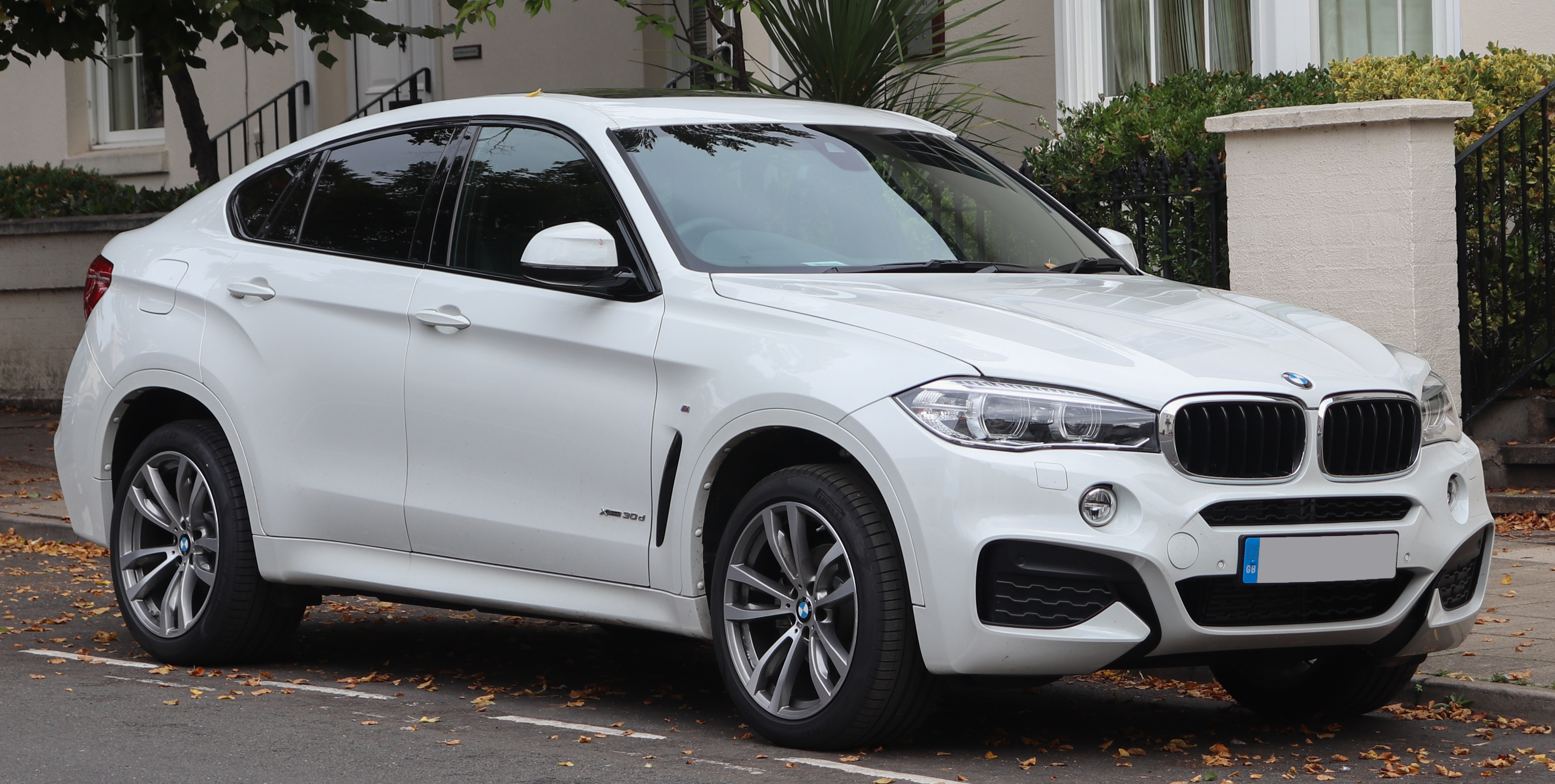
BMW X6 (F16)

=== Chery ===
==== Current models ====
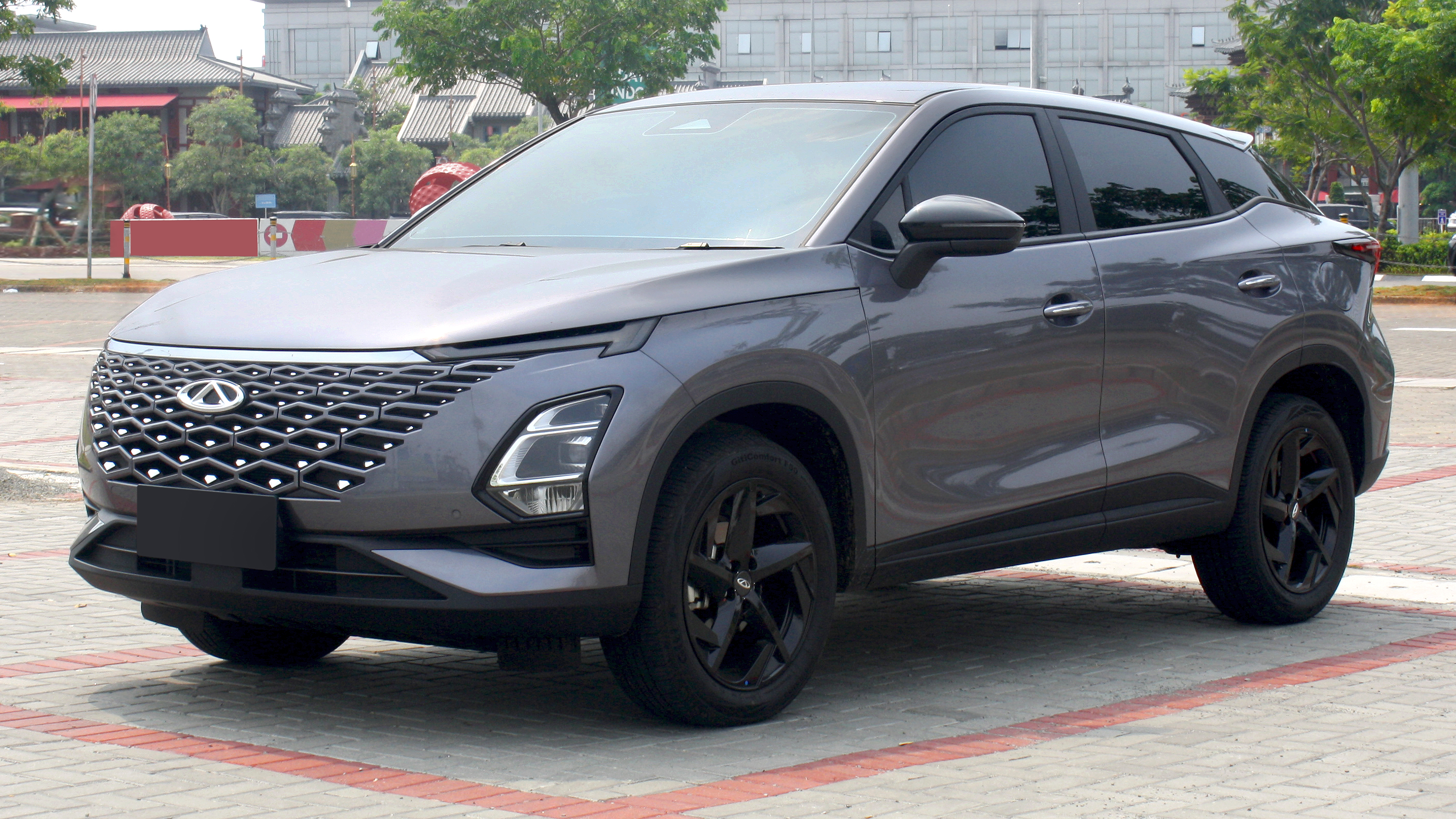
Chery Omoda 5

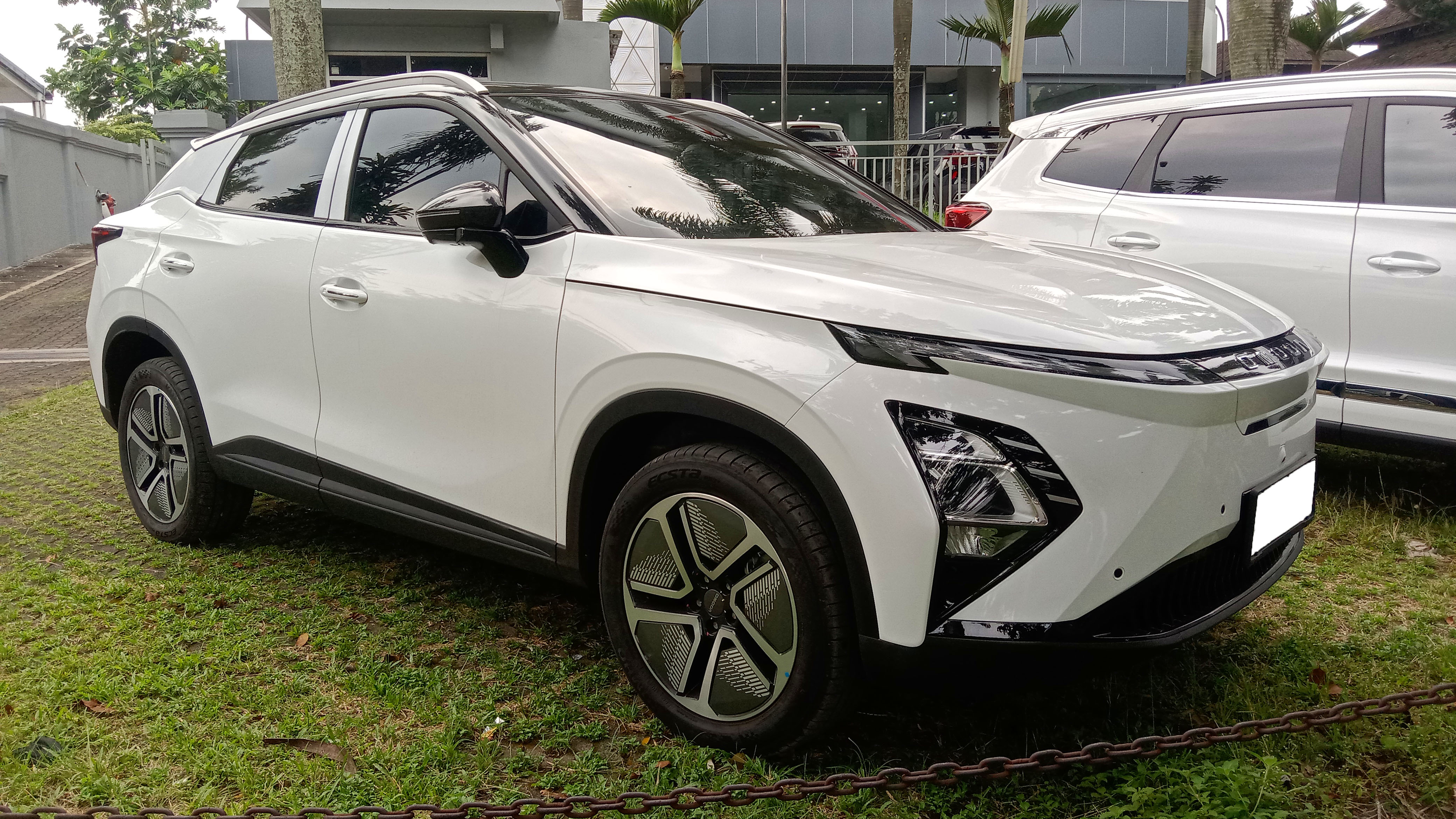
Chery Omoda E5

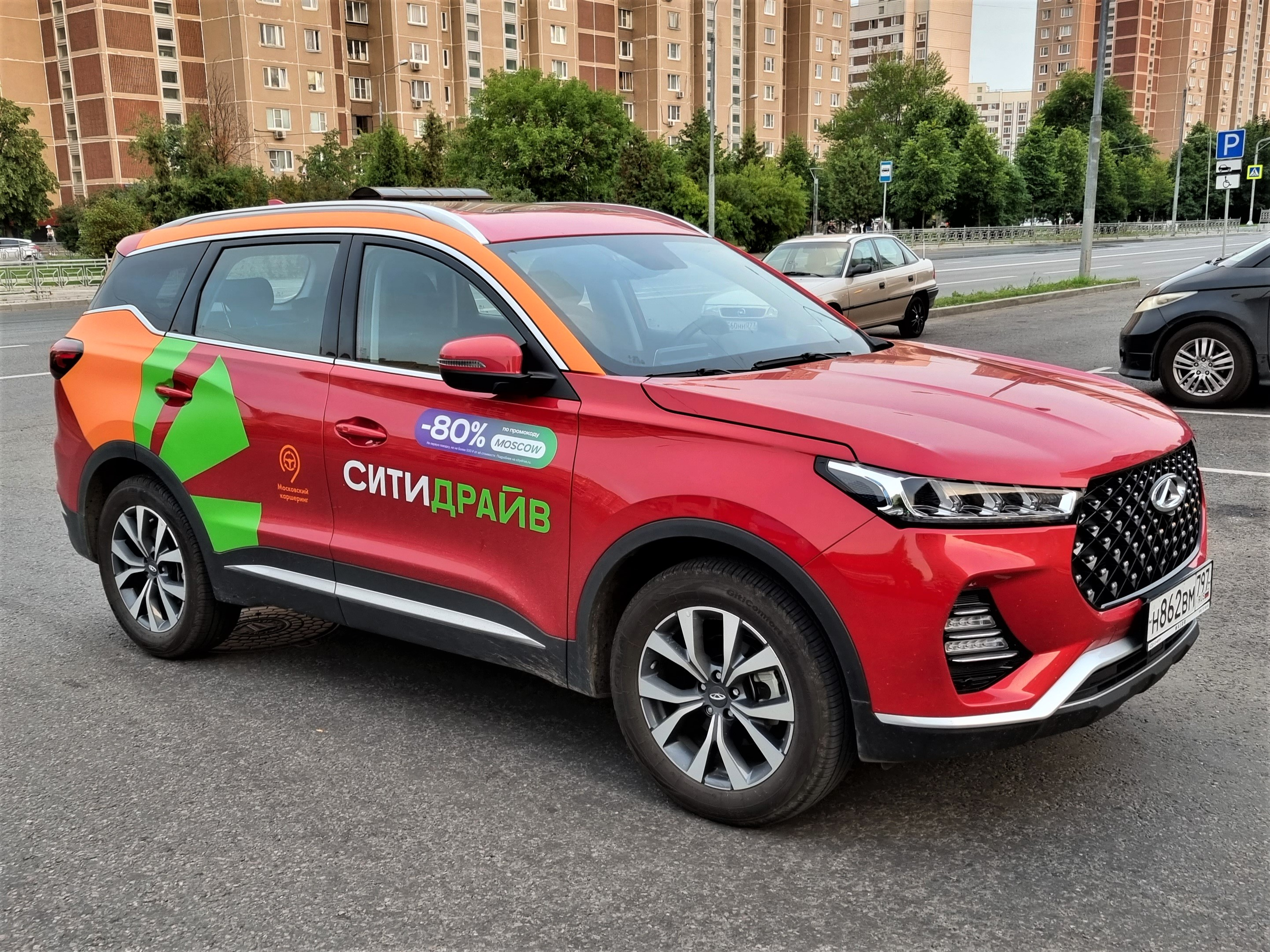
Chery Tiggo 7 Pro

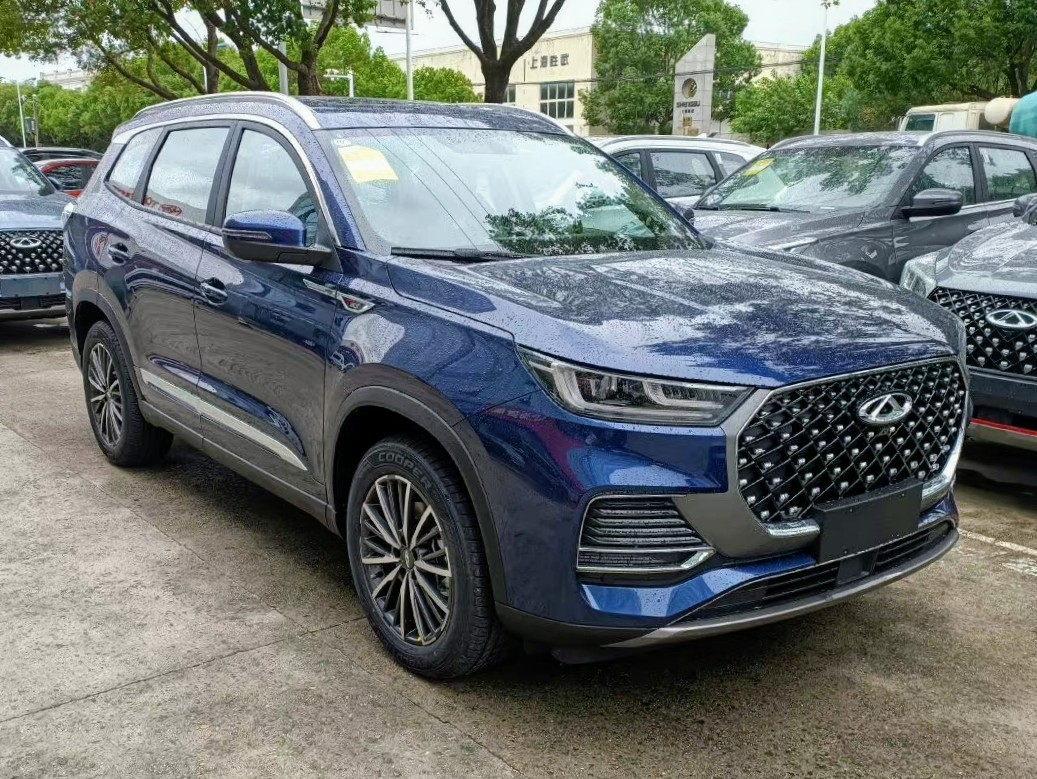
Chery Tiggo 8 Pro

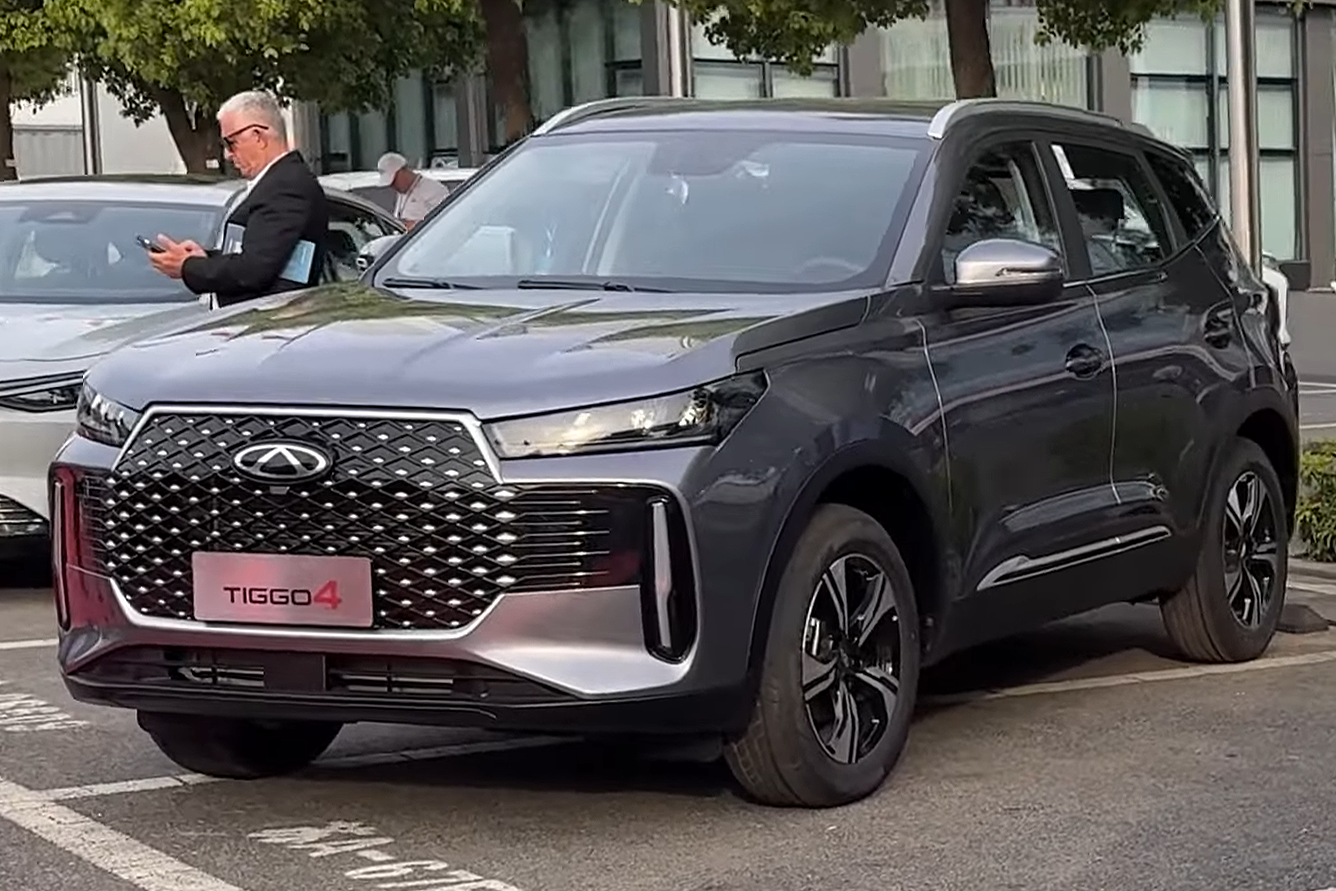
Chery Tiggo Cross

=== Hyundai ===
==== Current models ====
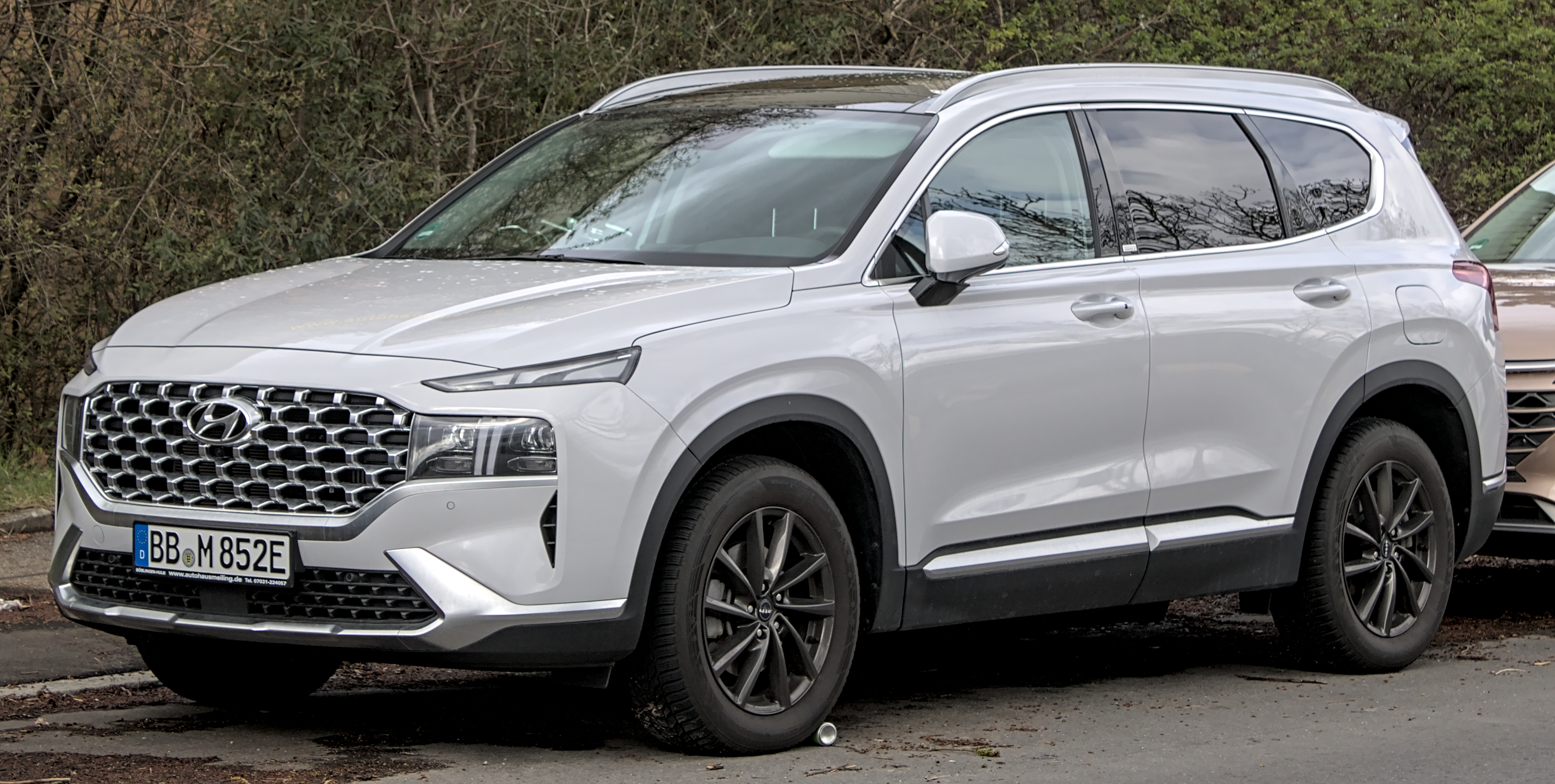
Hyundai Santa Fe (TM)

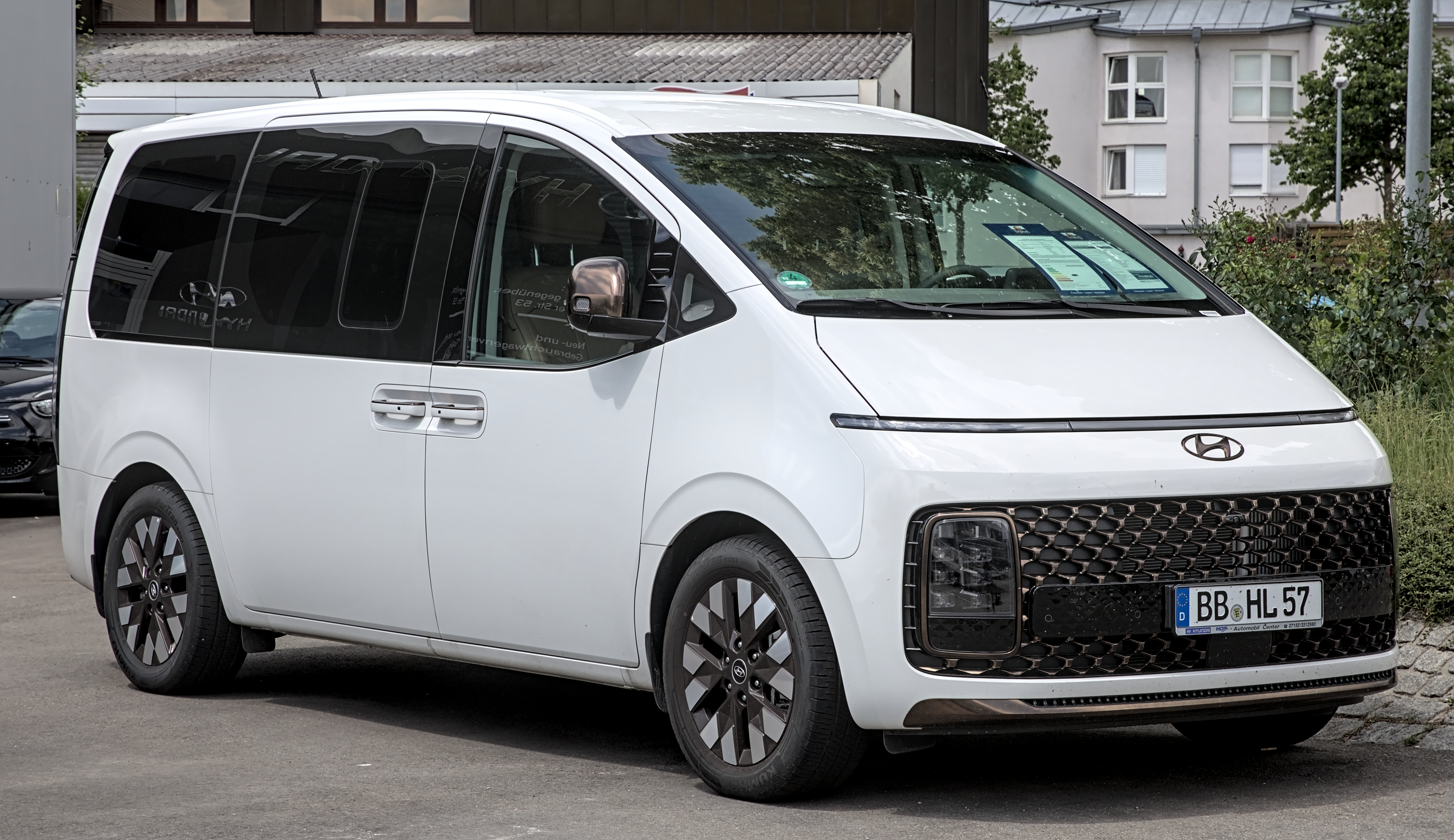
Hyundai Staria (US4)

=== Kia ===
==== Current models ====
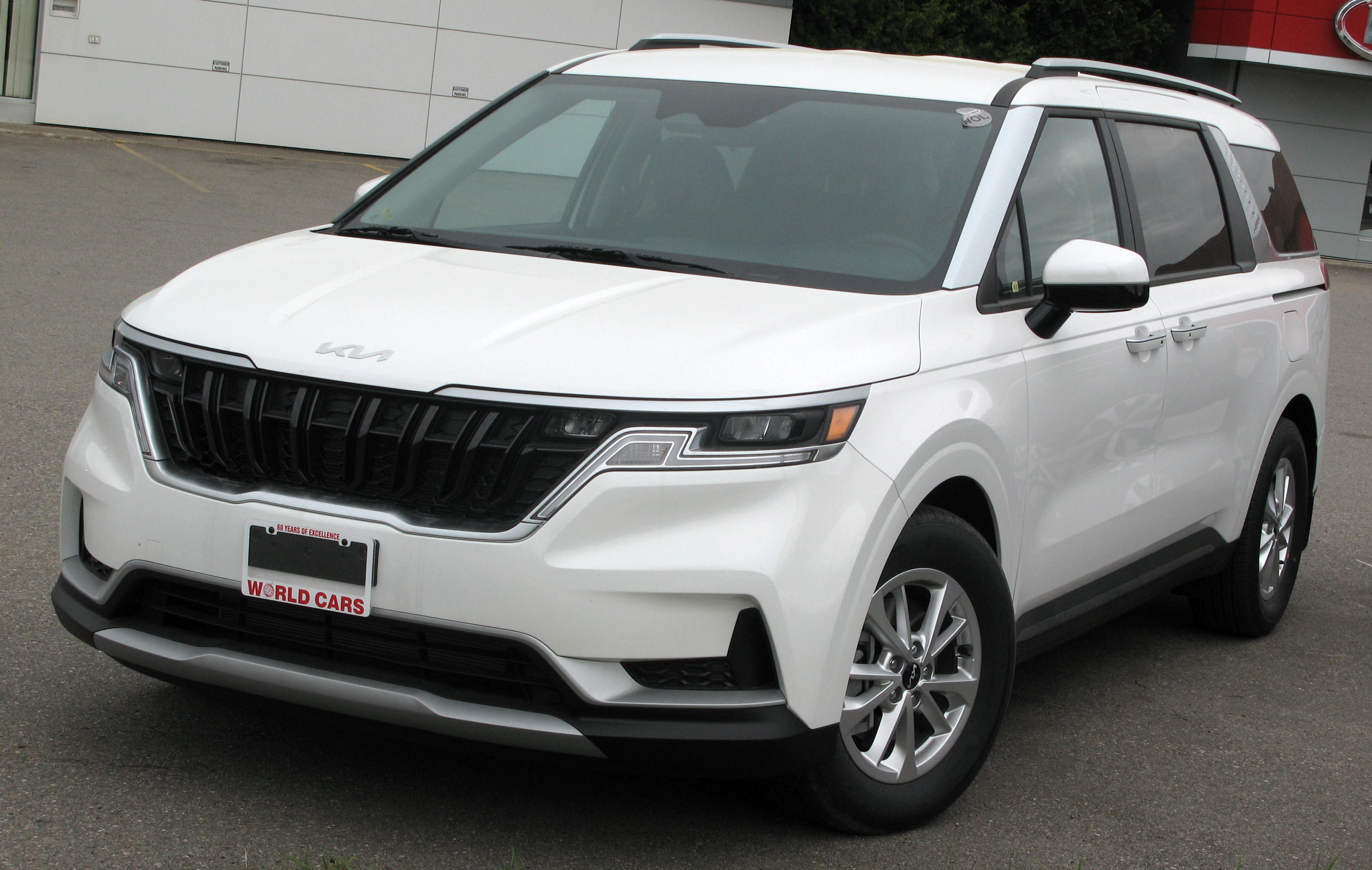
Kia Carnival (KA4) (7/8 passenger versions only)

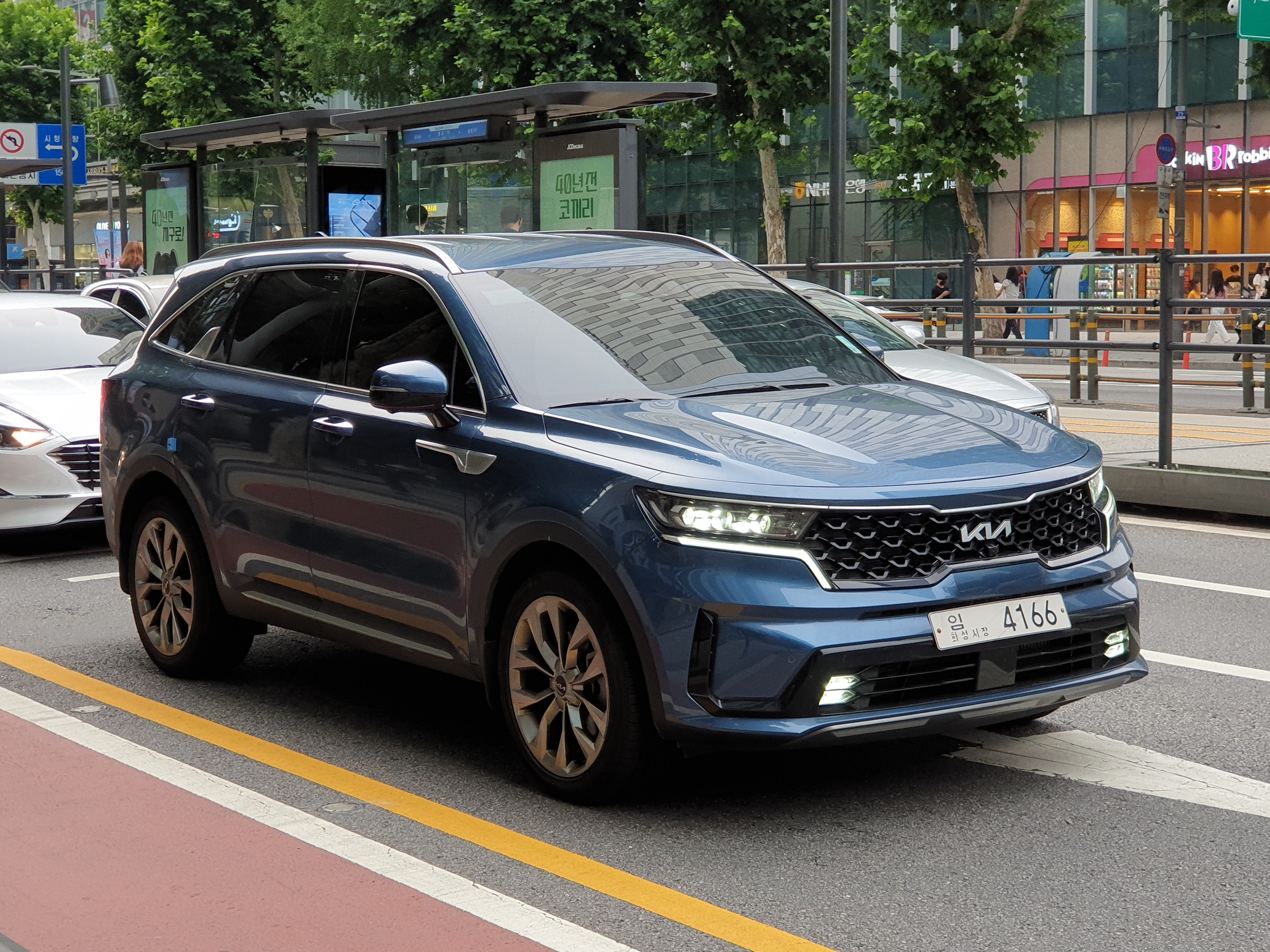
Kia Sorento (MQ4) (6/7 passenger versions only)

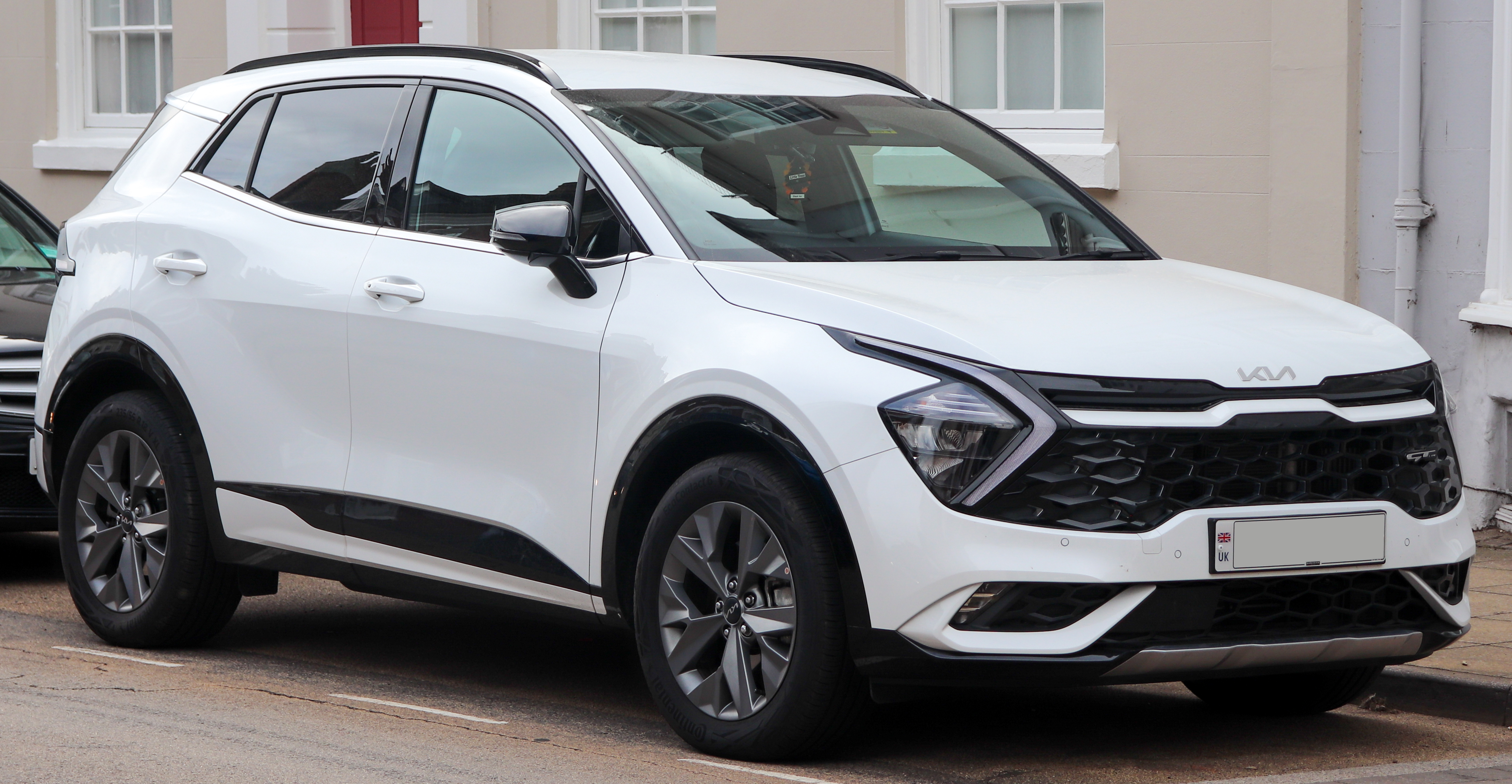
Kia Sportage (NQ5)

=== Mazda ===
==== Current models ====
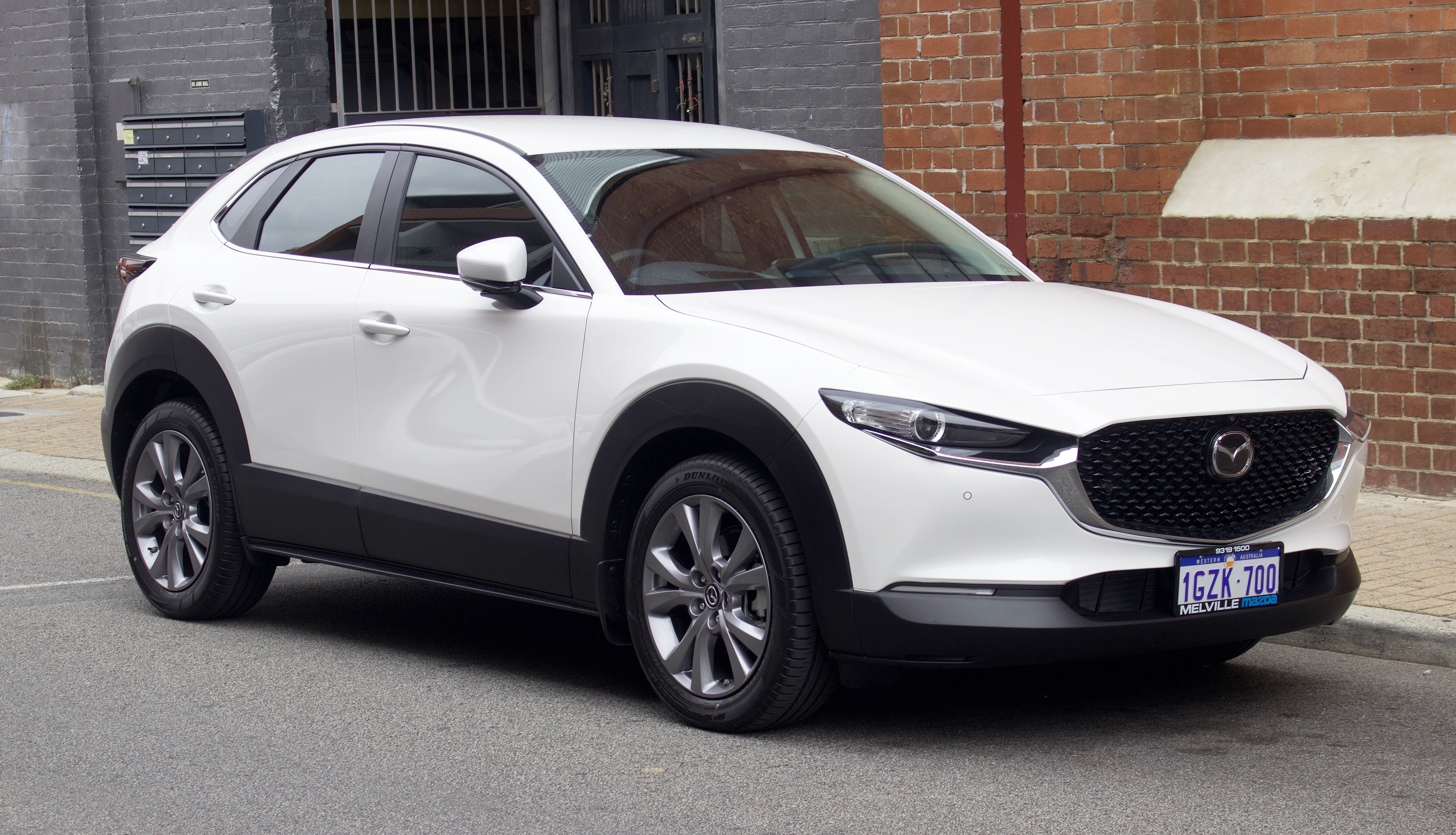
Mazda CX-30 (DM)

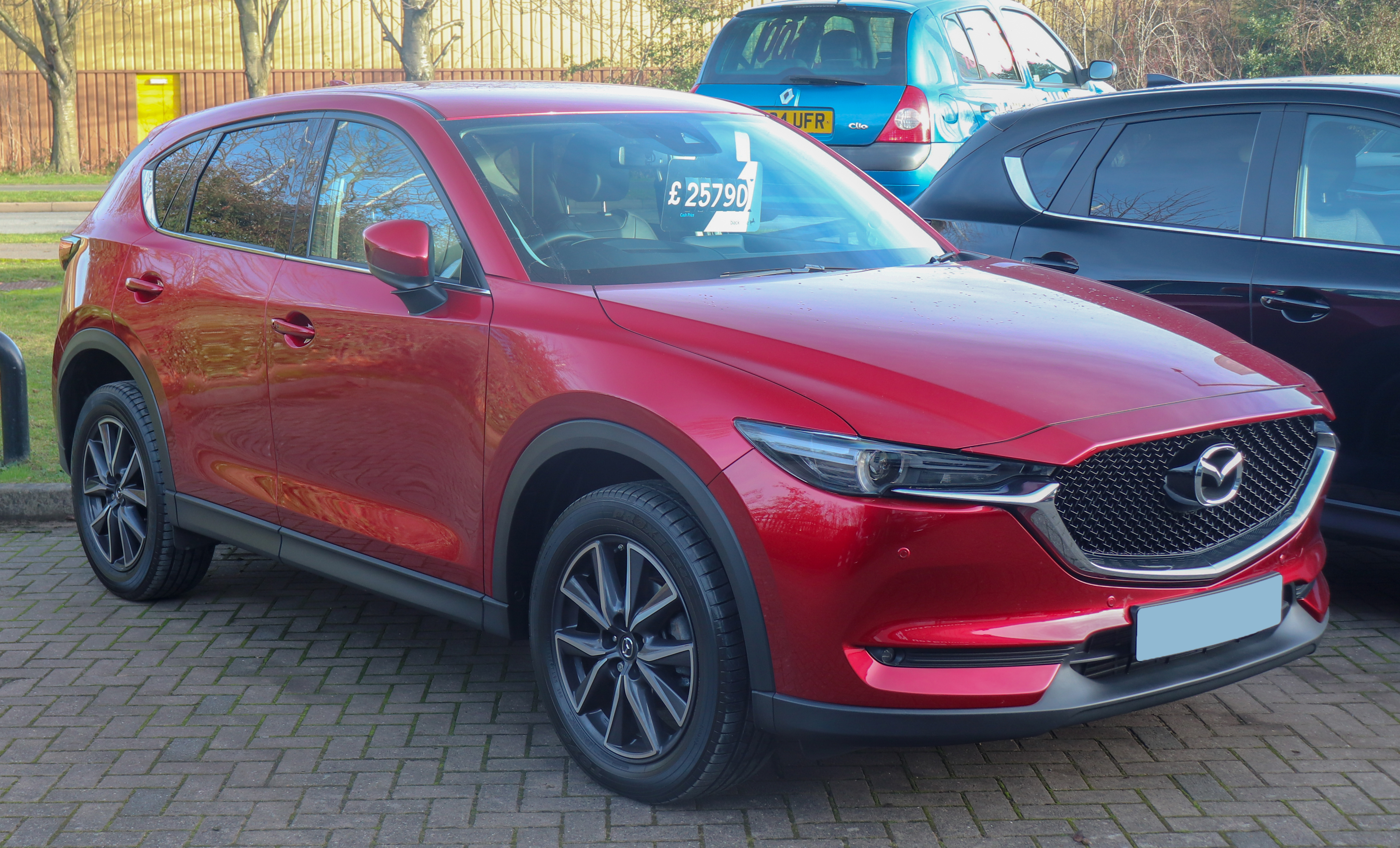
Mazda CX-5 (KF)

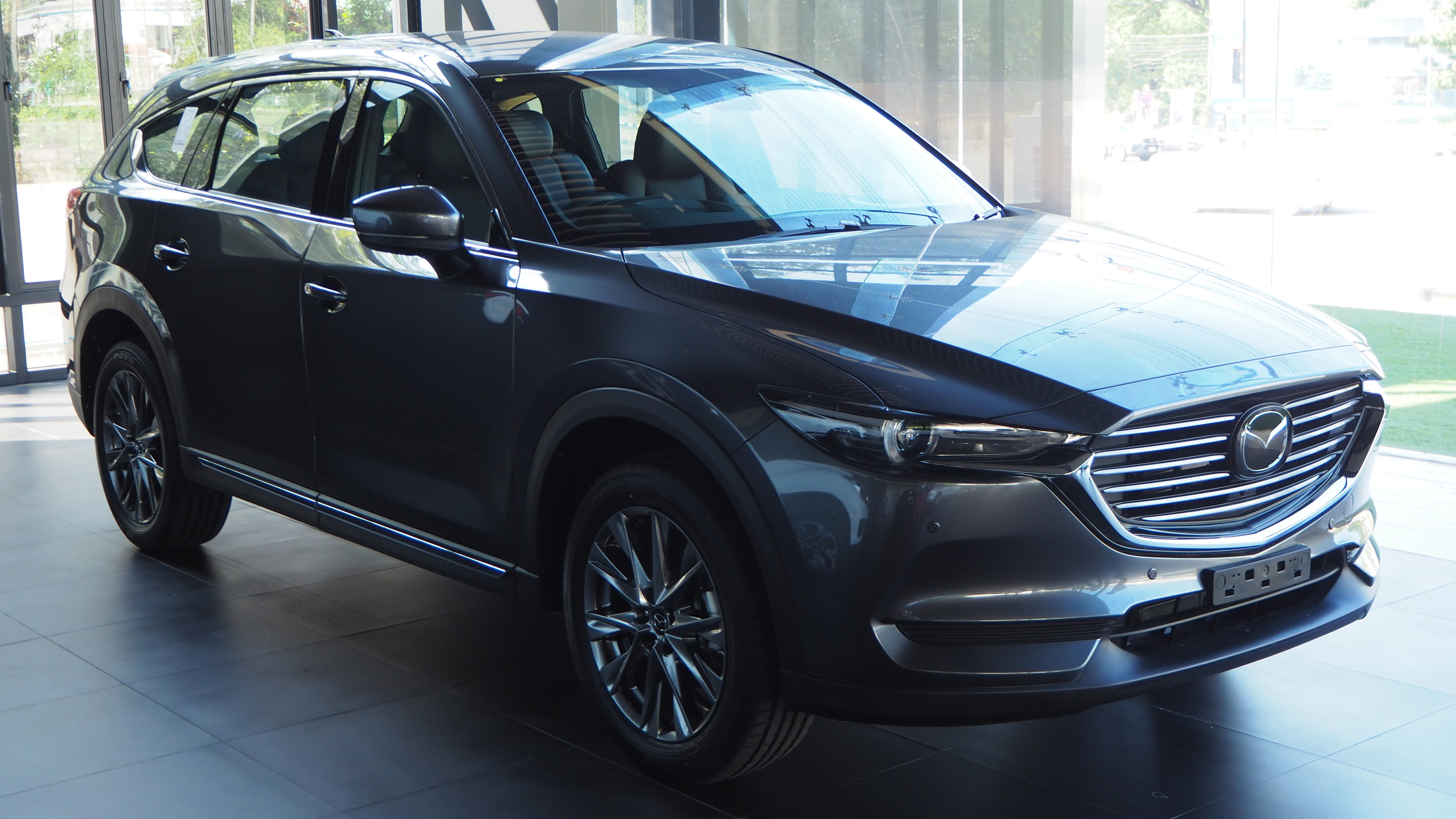
Mazda CX-8 (KG)

=== MINI ===
==== Current models ====
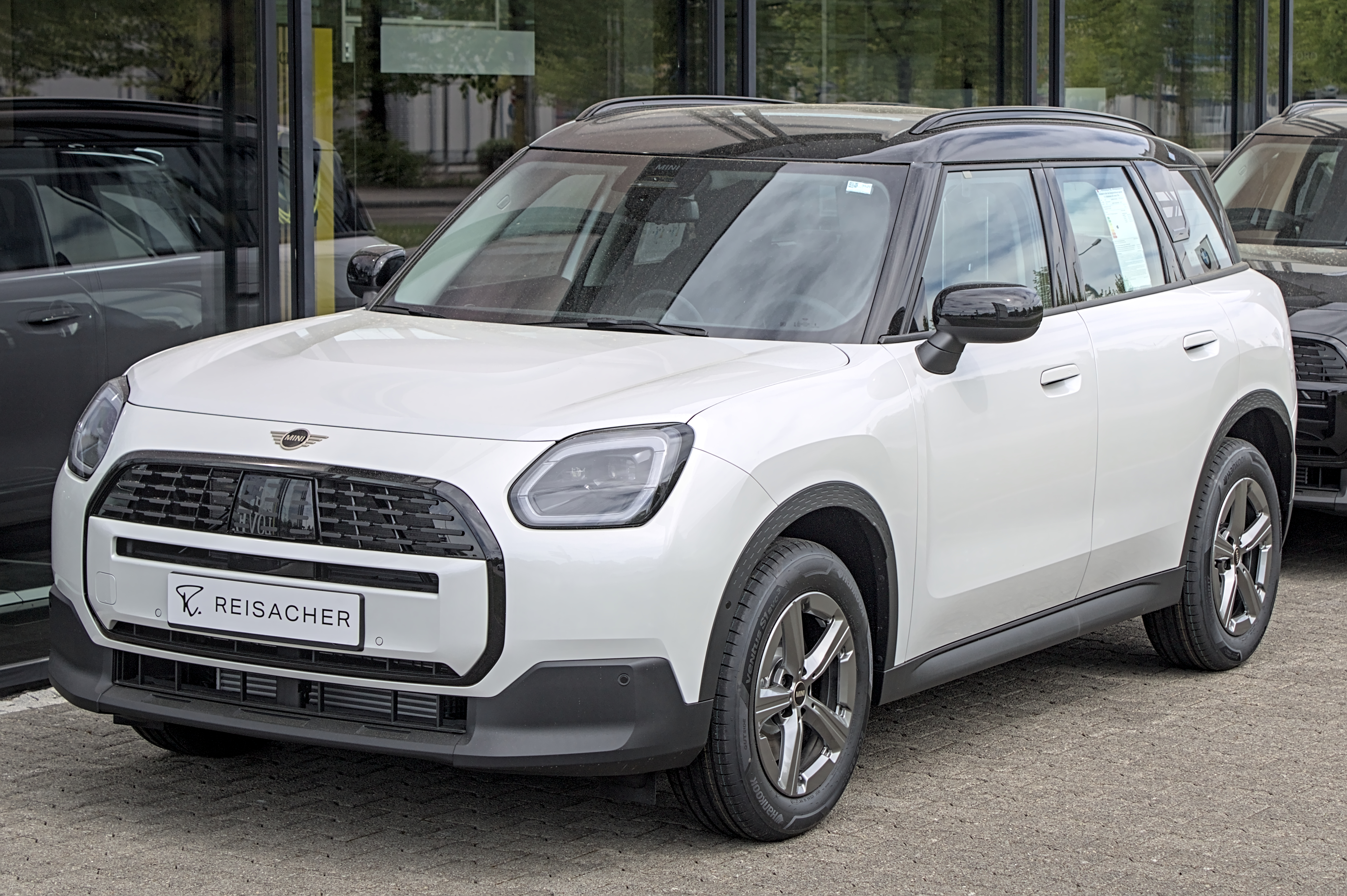
Mini Countryman (U25)

==== Former models ====
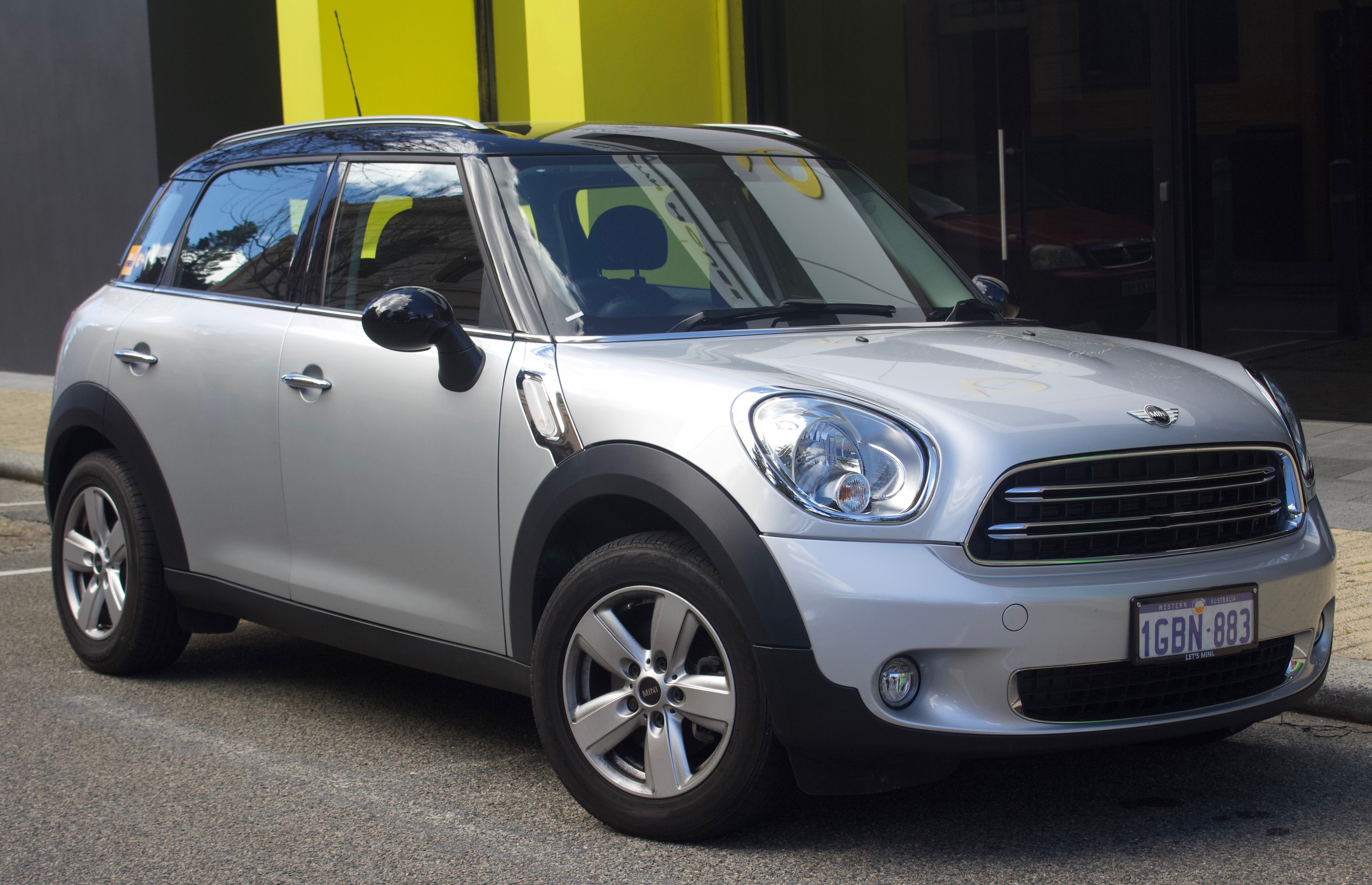
Mini Countryman (R60)

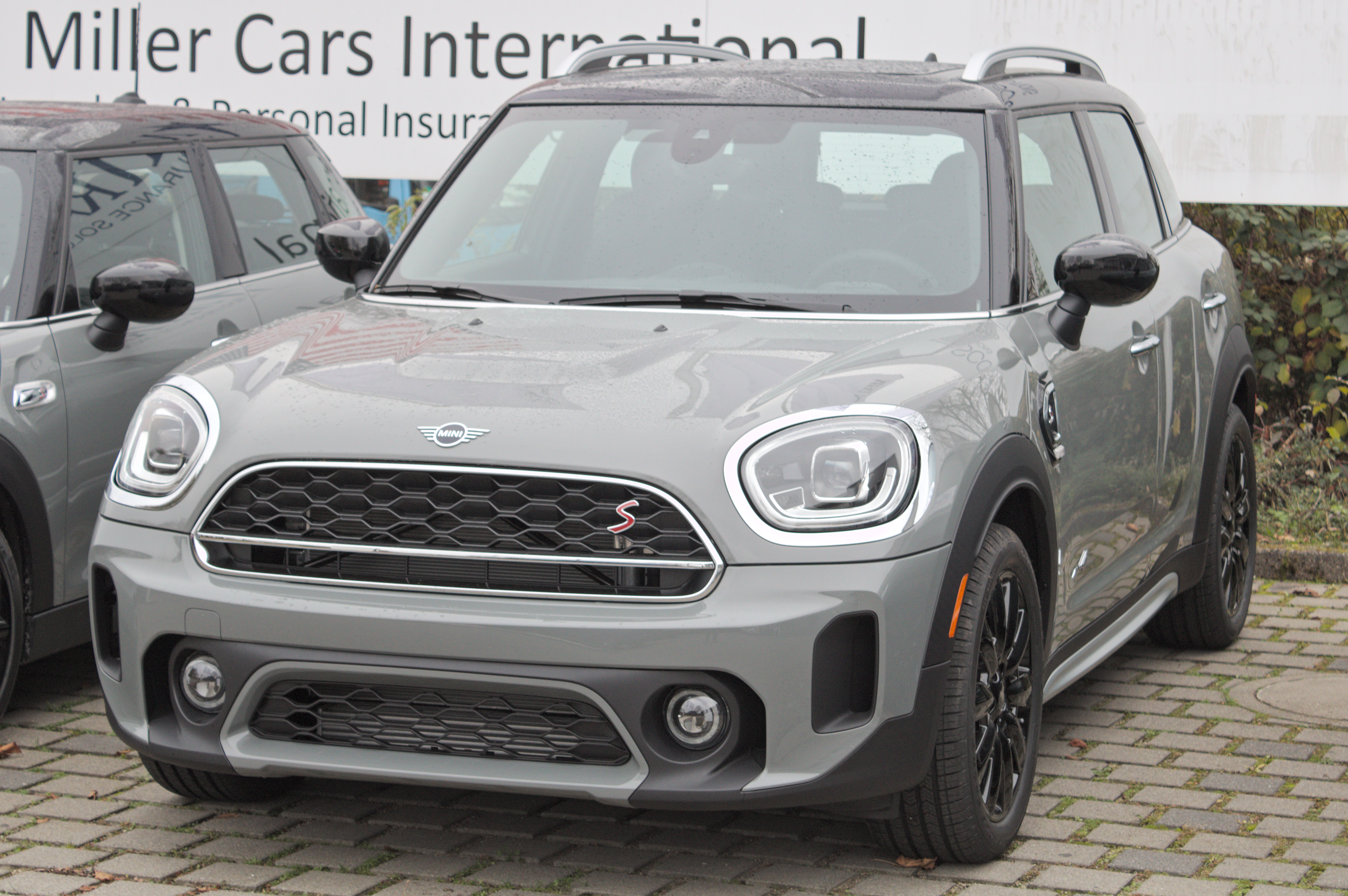
Mini Countryman (F60)

=== Porsche ===
==== Current models ====
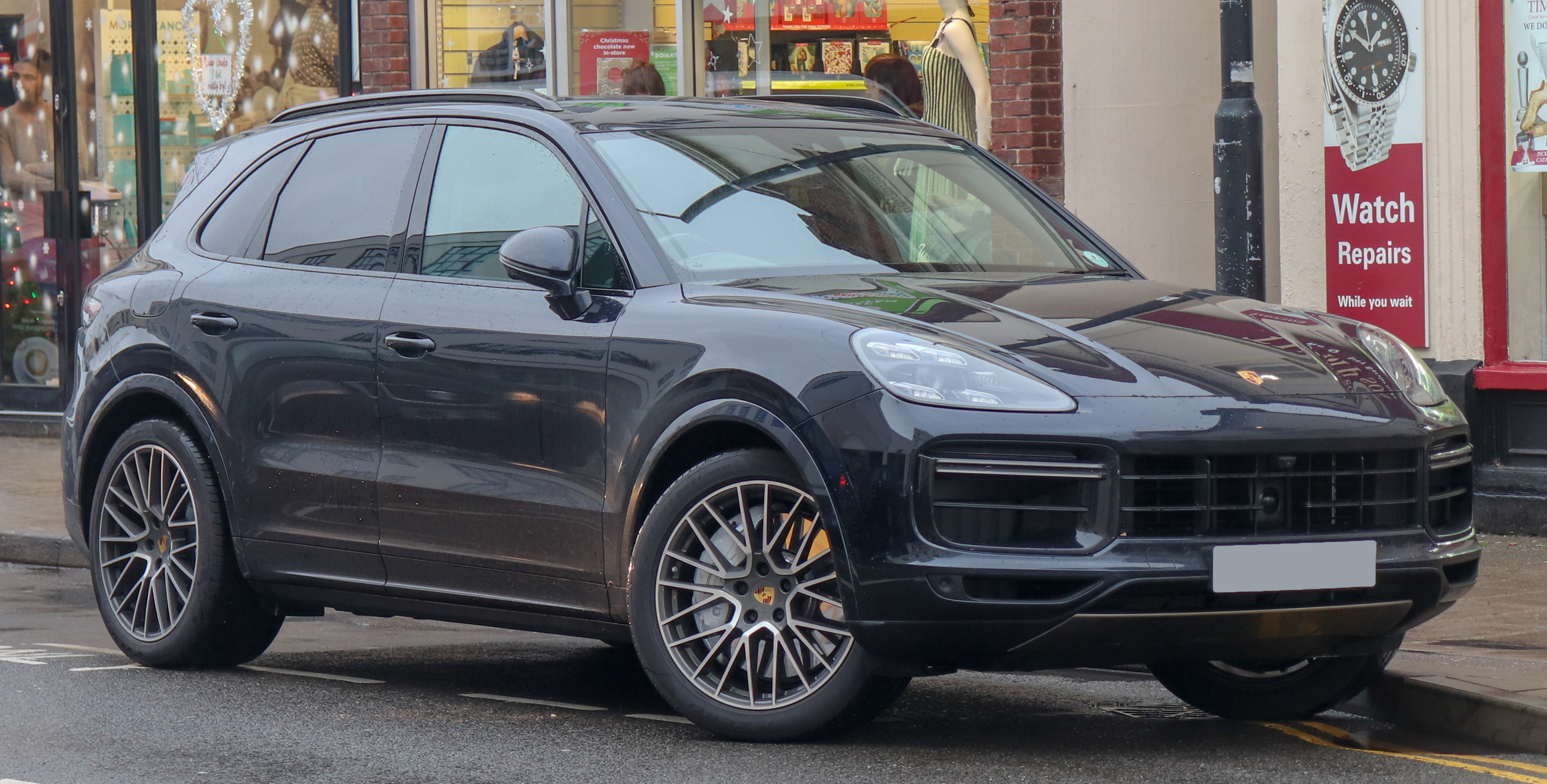
Porsche Cayenne (9Y) (3.0L V6 only)
