= Xcite =

Russian automobile brand

XCITE
- Current owner: AutoVAZ
- Produced by: St. Petersburg Auto Plant LLC
- Country: Russia
- Introduced: January 2024; 2 years ago

XCITE is a Russian car brand launched in Saint Petersburg in 2024. It sells rebadged Chery crossover SUVs assembled at the formerly Nissan owned AvtoVAZ facility in St. Petersburg, and sells vehicles online and through the Lada dealer network.

== Models ==
- XCITE X-Cross 7 (May 2024 – May 2025)
- XCITE X-Cross 8 (September 2024 – May 2025)
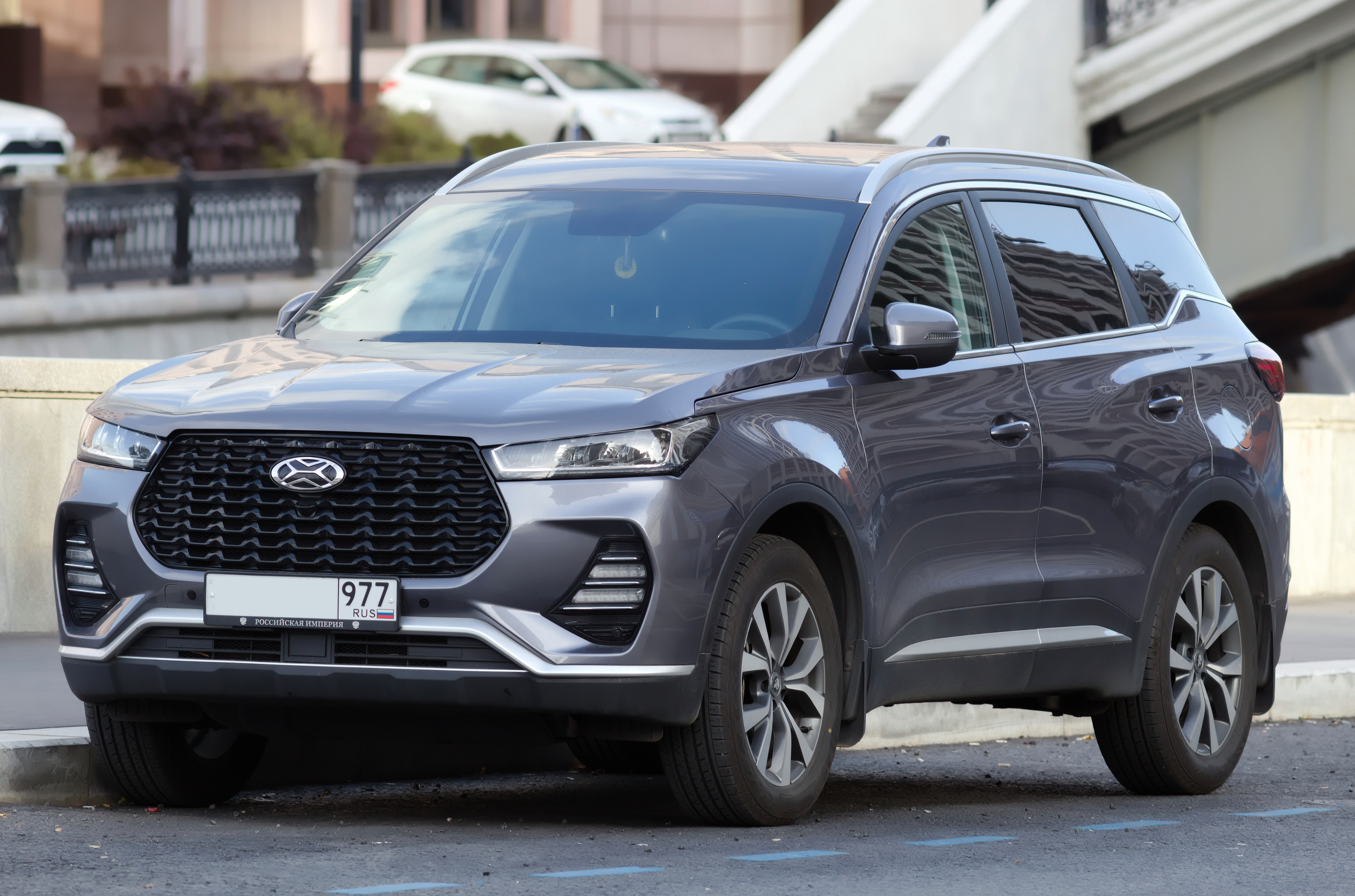
Xcite X-Cross 7

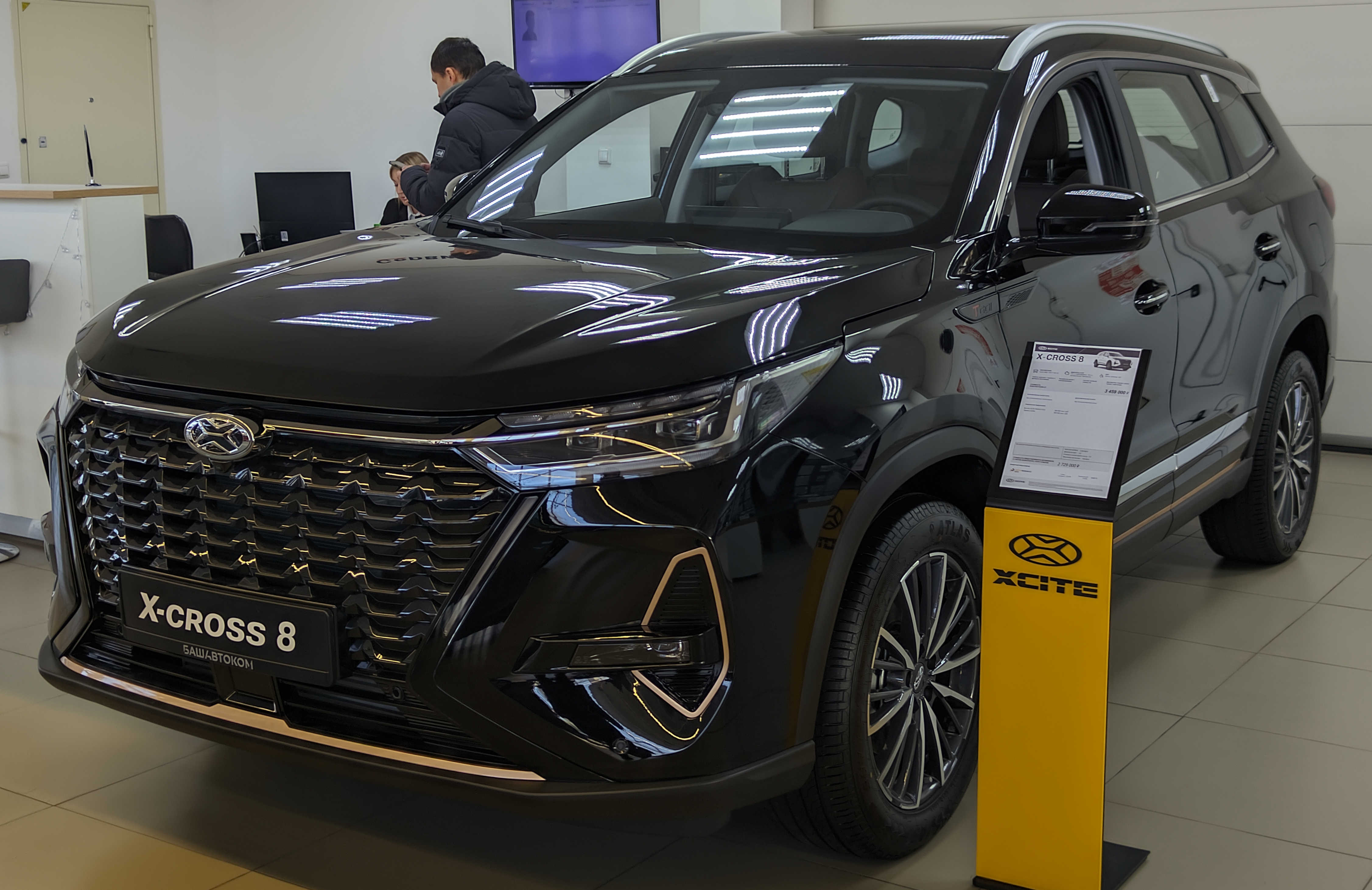
Xcite X-Cross 8
