= Chery Tiggo 7 =

Compact crossover SUV

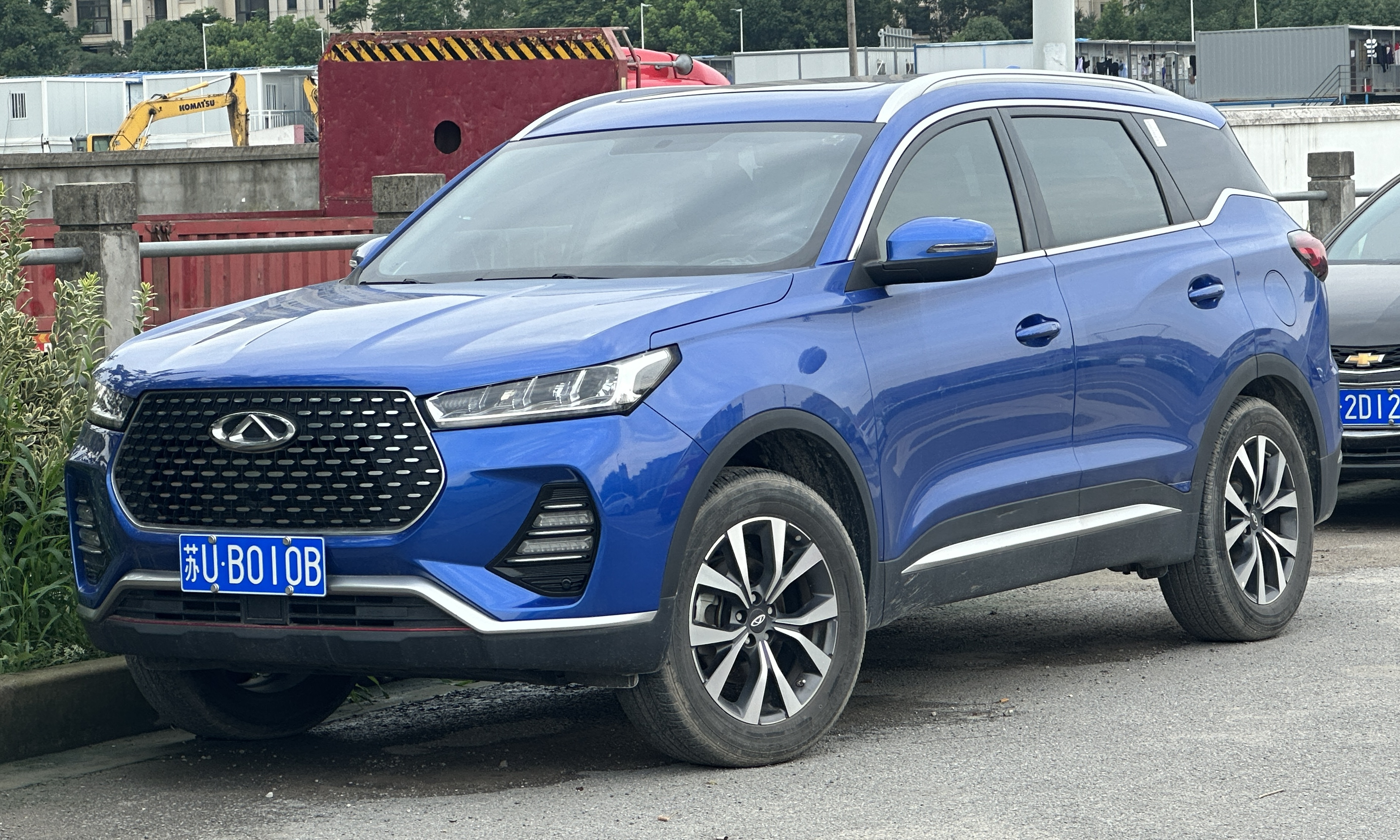

Overview
- Manufacturer: Chery
- Production: 2016–present

Body and chassis
- Class: Compact crossover SUV
- Body style: 5-door SUV

The Chery Tiggo 7 (Chinese: 奇瑞瑞虎7; pinyin: Qíruì Ruìhǔ 7) is a compact crossover SUV produced by the Chinese automaker Chery Automobile. The fourth model of the company's Tiggo crossover product series, the first-generation Tiggo 7 debuted in April 2016. The second-generation model debuted as a near-production concept car in November 2019, with the production model being revealed later December that year.

== First generation (2016) ==
First generation
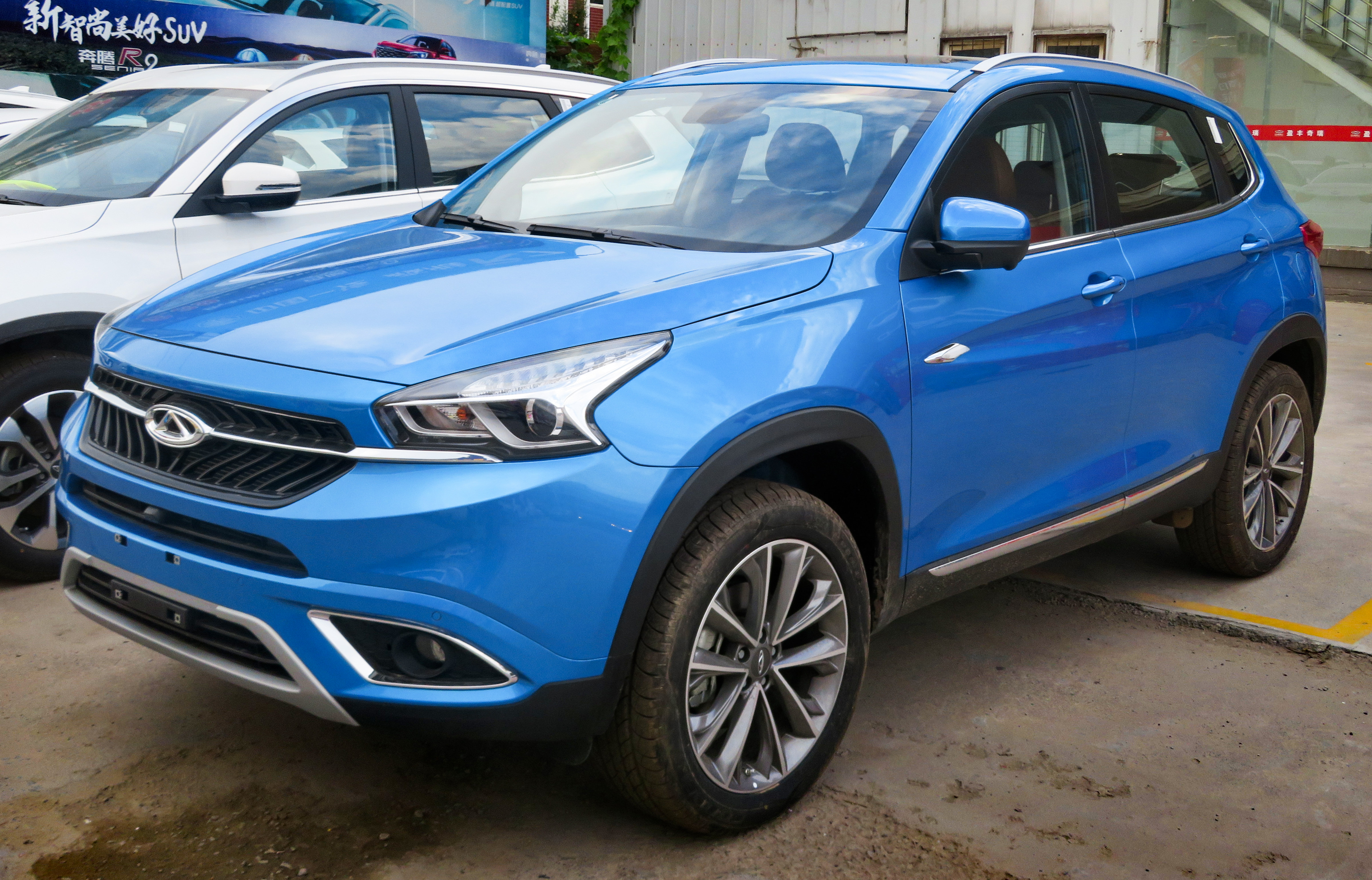

Overview
- Model code: T15
- Also called: Qoros Young (cancelled); DR F35 (Italy, 2020–2023)
- Production: 2016–2020
- Assembly: China: Wuhu, Anhui; Brazil: Anápolis (Caoa Chery); Iran: Bam, Kerman Province (MVM); Egypt: Cairo (GB Corp)
- Designer: James Hope

Body and chassis
- Layout: Front-engine, front-wheel-drive; Front-engine, all-wheel-drive
- Platform: T1X
- Related: Exeed LX

Powertrain
- Engine: Petrol: 1.5 L SQRE4T15 turbo I4; 2.0 L SQR484F I4
- Transmission: 6-speed manual; 6-speed DCT; CVT

Dimensions
- Wheelbase: 2,670 mm (105.1 in)
- Length: 4,505 mm (177.4 in)
- Width: 1,837 mm (72.3 in)
- Height: 1,670 mm (65.7 in)

Codenamed "T15", the first-generation Tiggo 7 was first presented on 24 April 2016, before making its public debut at the 2016 Beijing Auto Show. Sales started in China on 20 September 2016. Its design was based on the TX SUV concept, originally showcased at the 2012 Beijing Auto Show.

Positioned above the Tiggo 5 at the time, initial engine options include a 1.5-litre turbocharged petrol and a 2.0-litre naturally-aspirated petrol. Depending on the transmission option, the 1.5-litre turbocharged engine is rated at 110–113 kW (150–154 PS; 148–152 hp) and 205–210 N⋅m (151–155 lb⋅ft; 21–21 kg⋅m) of torque. The 2.0-litre naturally-aspirated engine is rated at 91 kW (124 PS; 122 hp) and 180 N⋅m (133 lb⋅ft; 18 kg⋅m) of torque. The 1.5-litre turbocharged models are mated to either a 6-speed dual-clutch transmission (DCT) or a 6-speed manual, while the 2.0-litre models are only mated to a continuously variable transmission (CVT). The first-generation Tiggo 7 would later provided as the basis of the upmarket Exeed LX, which was introduced in 2019.

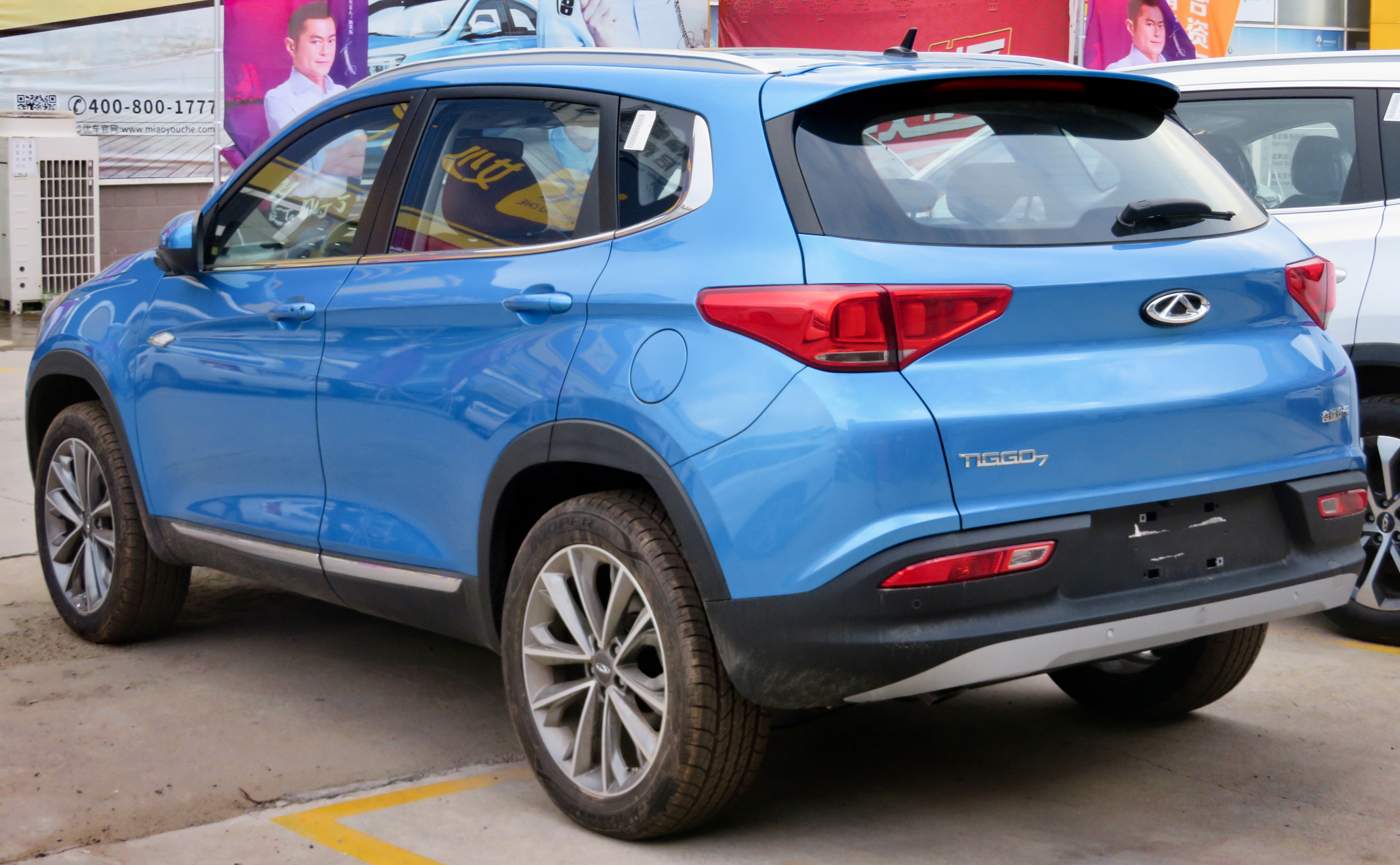
Rear view

=== 2018 facelift (Tiggo 7 Fly) ===
The facelifted model was revealed on 21 September 2018 as the Tiggo 7 Fly, before went on sale about a week later that month. The facelifted Fly model carries over the 1.5-litre turbocharged petrol engine, mated to either a 6-speed dual-clutch (DCT) or a 6-speed manual, from the pre-facelift model. The facelifted Fly model was first previewed in August 2017, where it was originally planned to be sold under the Qoros brand as the Qoros Young (Chinese: 观致青年; pinyin: Guān Zhì Qīngnián) but was never released for unknown reason.

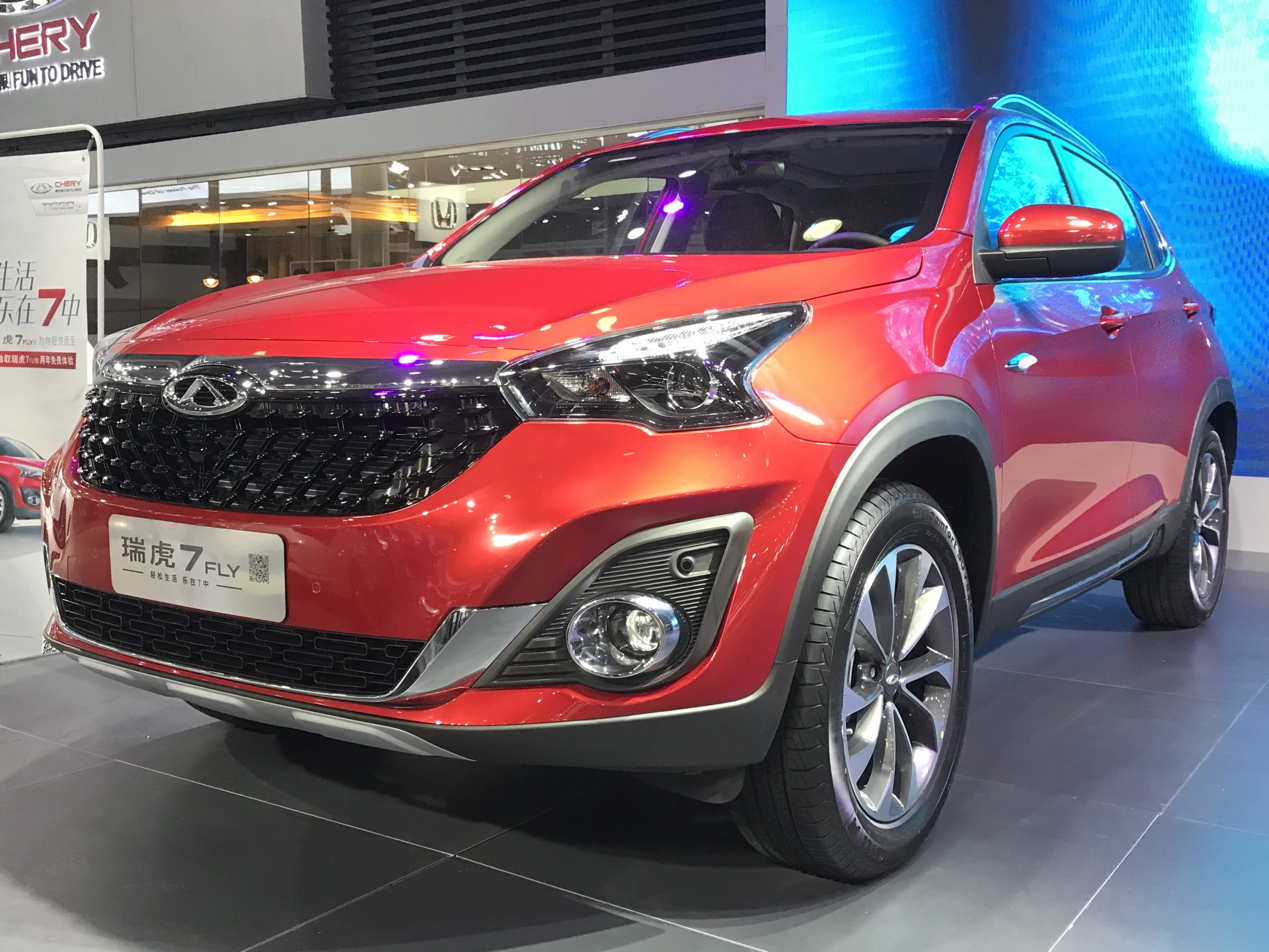
Tiggo 7 Fly

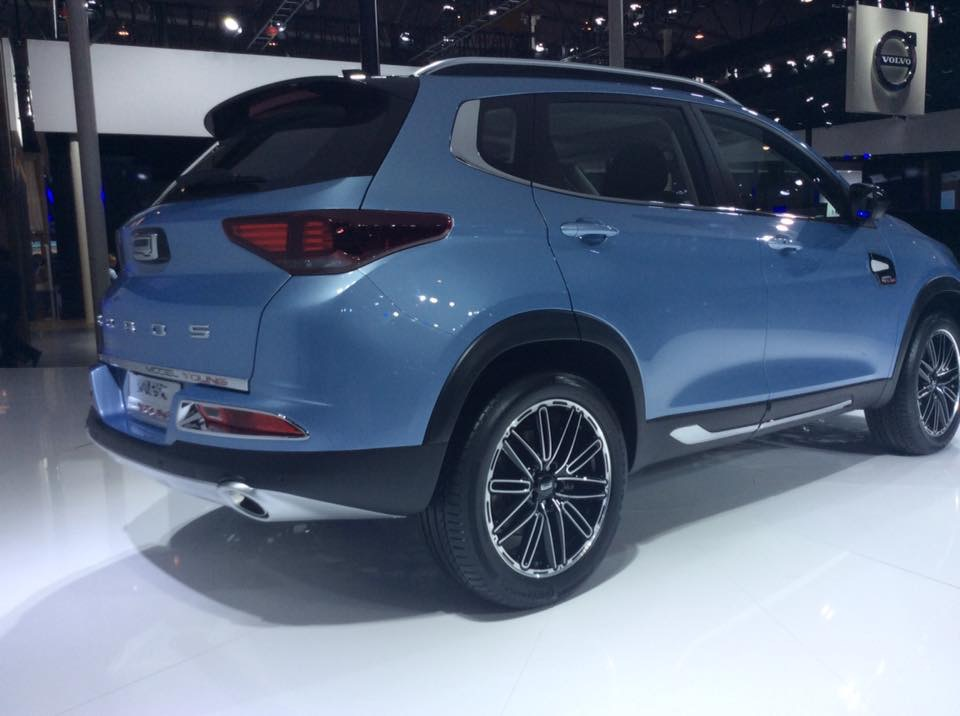
Qoros Young

=== DR F35 (2020–2023) ===
Between 2020 and 2023, DR Automobiles marketed the first-generation Tiggo 7 in Italy as the DR F35. The F35 adopts the styling from the facelifted Tiggo 7 Fly, while sporting a different front grille, along with additional details on the front bumper. It is only available with a 1.5-litre turbocharged engine, available with either a conventional petrol or a bi-fuel (petrol/LPG) setup (later marketed by DR as the Thermohybrid since 2021).

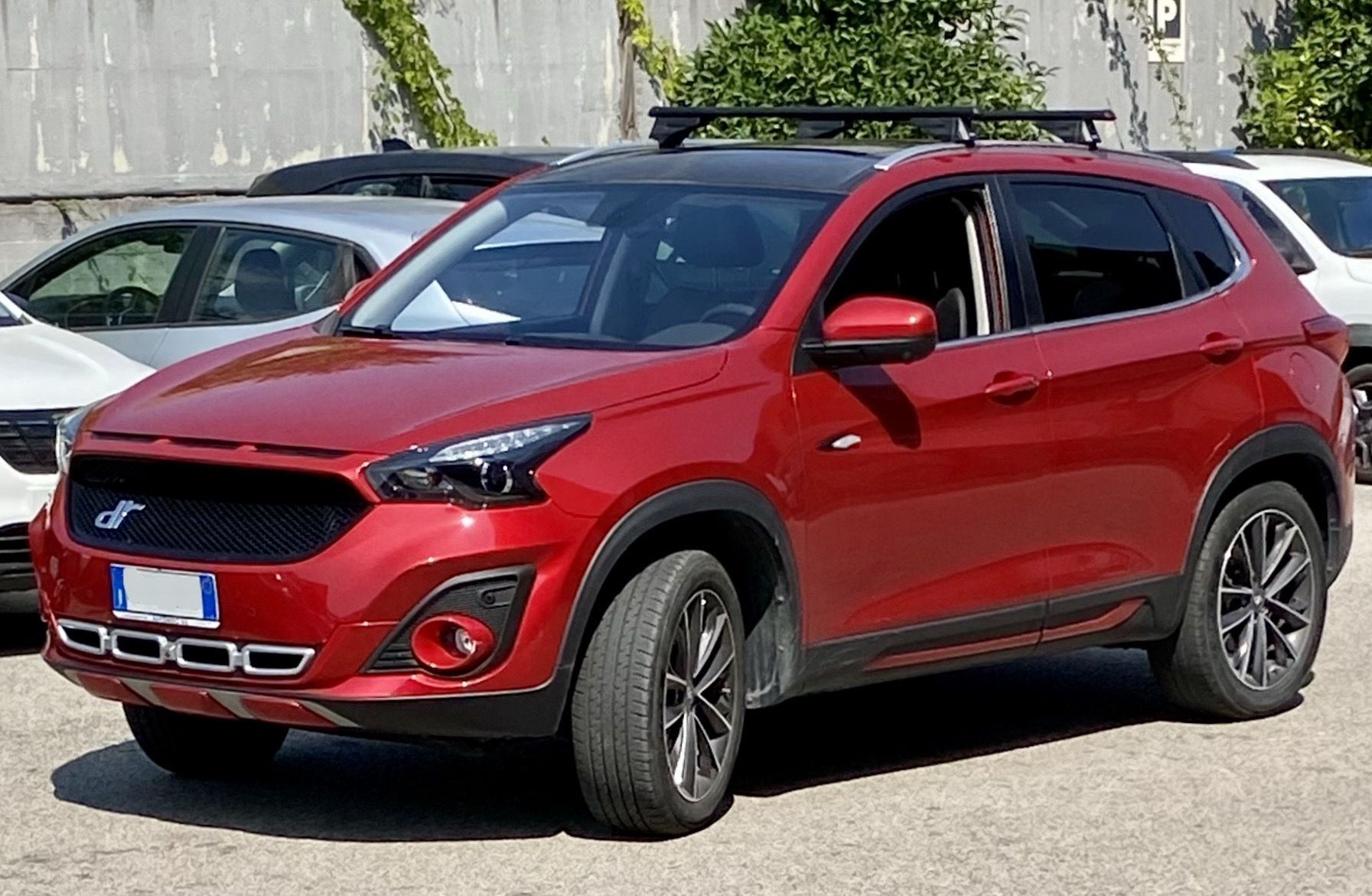
DR F35

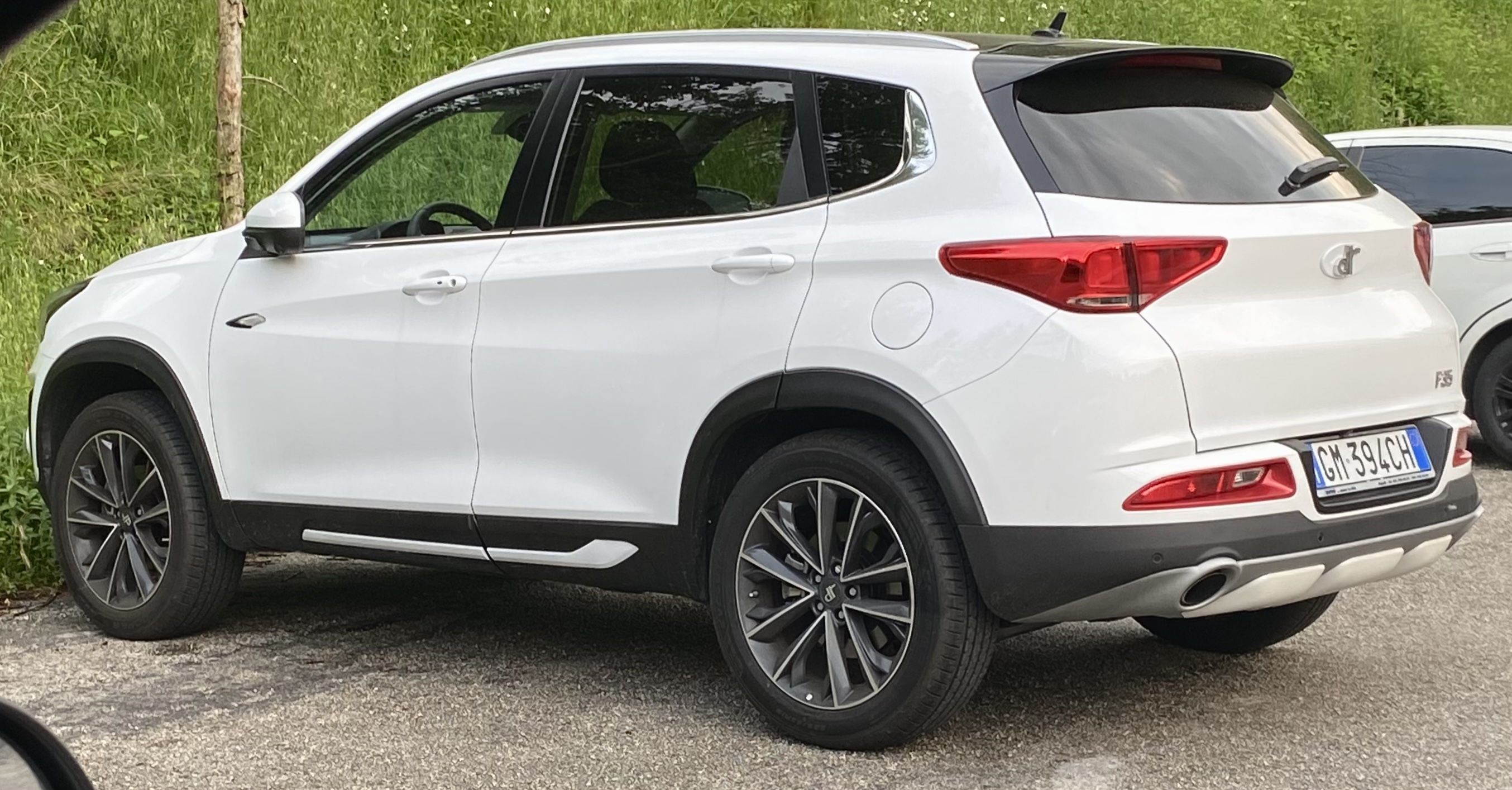
Rear view

== Second generation (2020) ==
Second generation
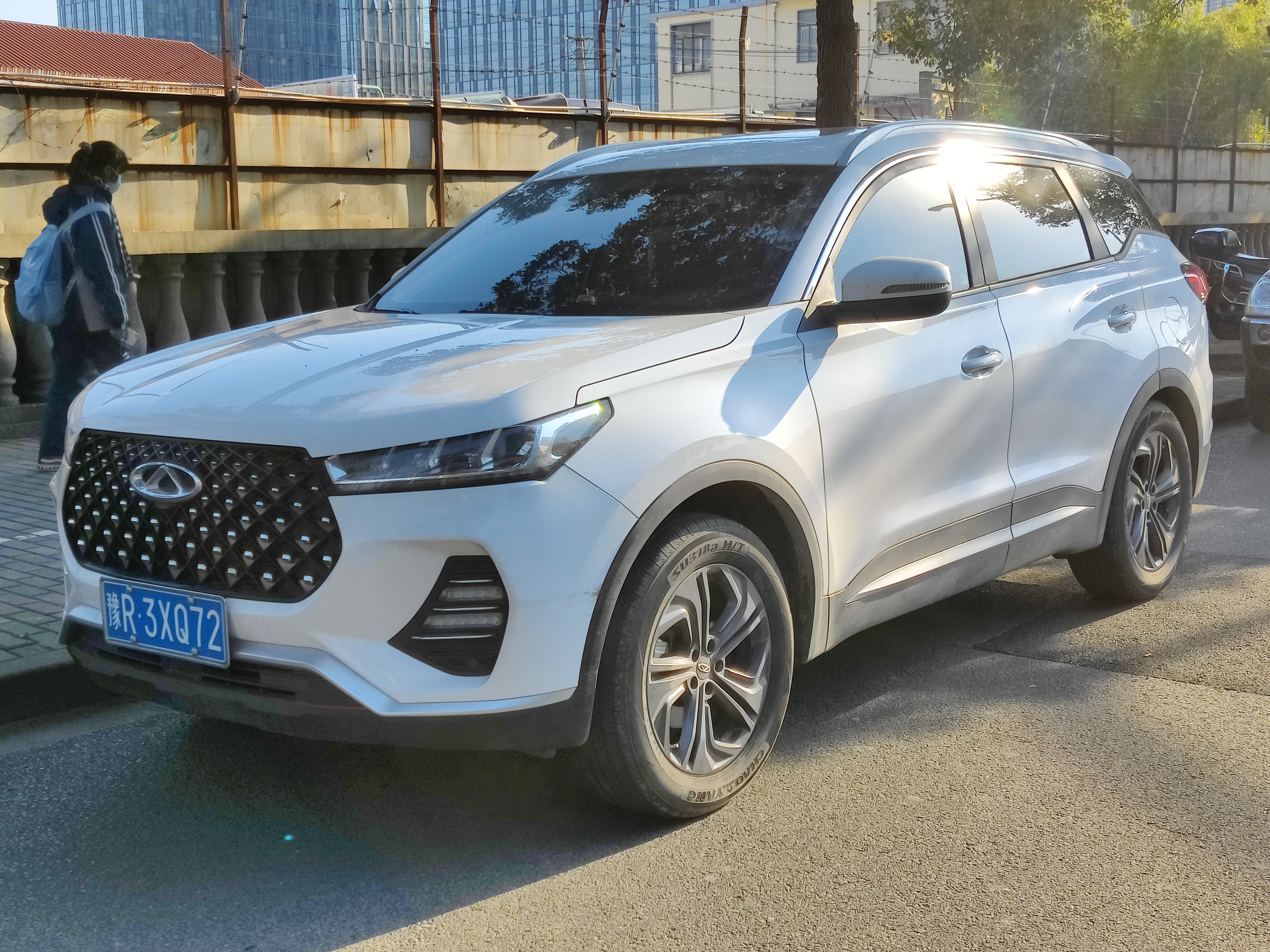

Overview
- Model code: T1E
- Also called: Chirey Tiggo 7 (Mexico); DR 6.0 (Italy); Sportequipe 6 (Italy); Fownix Tiggo 7 Pro (Iran); Xcite X-Cross 7 (Russia, 2024–present); Ebro S700 (Spain, 2024–present); Tenet T4L (Russia, 2026–present); Tenet T7 (Russia, 2025–present)
- Production: 2020–present
- Assembly: China: Wuhu, Anhui; Brazil: Anápolis (Caoa Chery); Indonesia: Bekasi, West Java (HIM); Malaysia: Kulim, Kedah (Inokom); Iran: Bam, Kerman Province (MVM); Russia: St. Petersburg (Lada Saint Petersburg, Xcite X-Cross 7); Spain: Barcelona (Ebro); Russia: Kaluga (AGR, Tenet T7)
- Designer: Richard Koo

Body and chassis
- Layout: Front-engine, front-wheel-drive; Front-engine, all-wheel-drive
- Platform: T1X
- Related: Chery Tiggo 5x; Chery Tiggo 8; Kaiyi Showjet; Omoda C5; Exeed LX

Powertrain
- Engine: Petrol: 1.5 L SQRE4T15C turbo I4; 1.6 L SQRF4J16 turbo I4; Petrol mild hybrid: 1.5 L ACTECO turbo I4; Petrol plug-in hybrid: 1.5 L ACTECO turbo I4
- Electric motor: 48 V belt starter-generator (mild hybrid); Permanent magnet synchronous reluctance (PHEV)
- Transmission: Manual: 6-speed manual; Automatic: 1-speed DHT (PHEV; export); 3-speed DHT (PHEV); 7-speed DCT; CVT
- Hybrid drivetrain: Mild hybrid; Plug-in hybrid
- Battery: 48 V lithium-ion (MHEV); 18.3 kWh LFP battery (PHEV)
- Electric range: 93 km (58 mi) (PHEV)

Dimensions
- Wheelbase: 2,670 mm (105.1 in)
- Length: 4,500 mm (177.2 in)
- Width: 1,842 mm (72.5 in)
- Height: 1,746 mm (68.7 in)
- Curb weight: 1,465 kg (3,230 lb)

Codenamed "T1E", the second-generation Tiggo 7 was originally debuted in November 2019 at the 2019 Guangzhou International Auto Show in a near-production concept guise. The production version was revealed on 23 December 2019. Sales were commenced in China on 9 March 2020, with a market debut in Russia later that year.

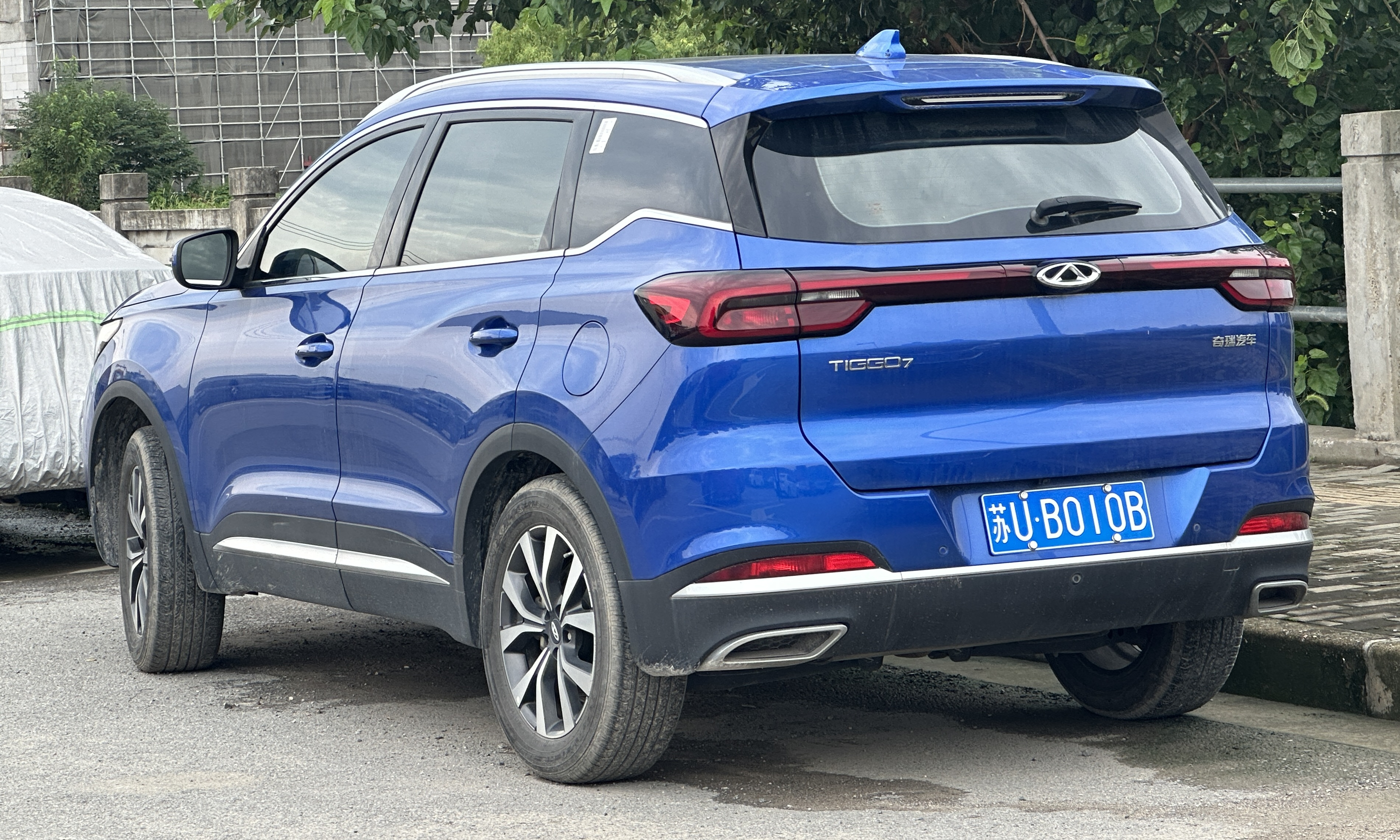
Rear view

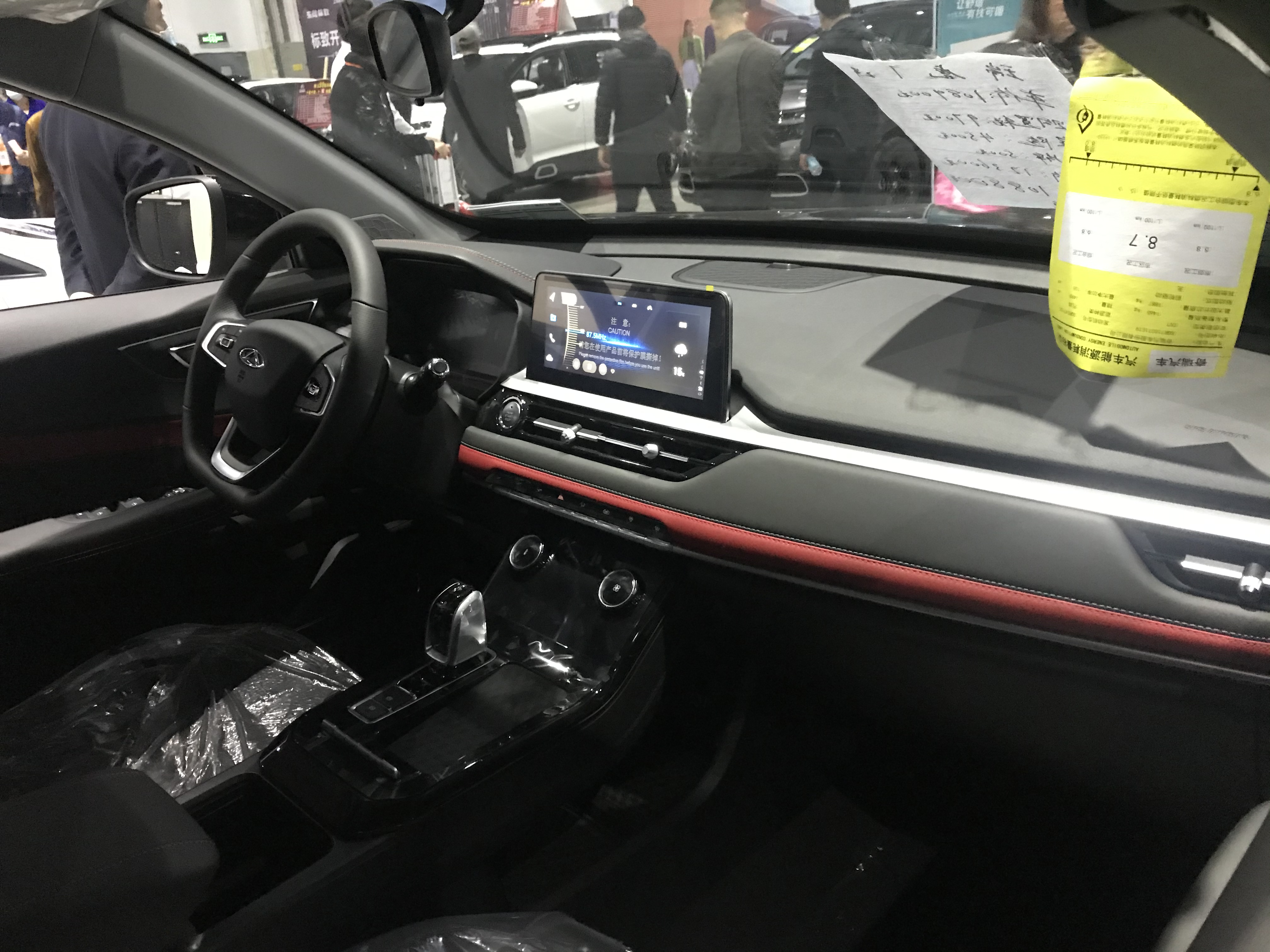
Interior

=== Tiggo 7 Plus (2021) ===
An upmarket variant of the second-generation Tiggo 7, called the Tiggo 7 Plus, was revealed for the Chinese market in August 2021 at the 2021 Chengdu Auto Show, with sales commenced on 27 September 2021. The exterior design features a redesigned front fascia and slightly updated rear taillights, with the Chery logo badge on the rear was replaced by a 'CHERY' badging script placed above the taillights. The interior features an updated dashboard design with its infotainment system running on Chery's Lion 4.0 operating system, which features Baidu CarLife and Apple CarPlay. The Plus version also introduces a mild hybrid (MHEV) powertrain to the lineup.

In select export markets, the 2021 Plus' exterior design was adopted to the global-market Tiggo 7 Pro. In Russia (2023 MY only) and select Middle East markets, the model was sold as the Tiggo 7 Pro Max.

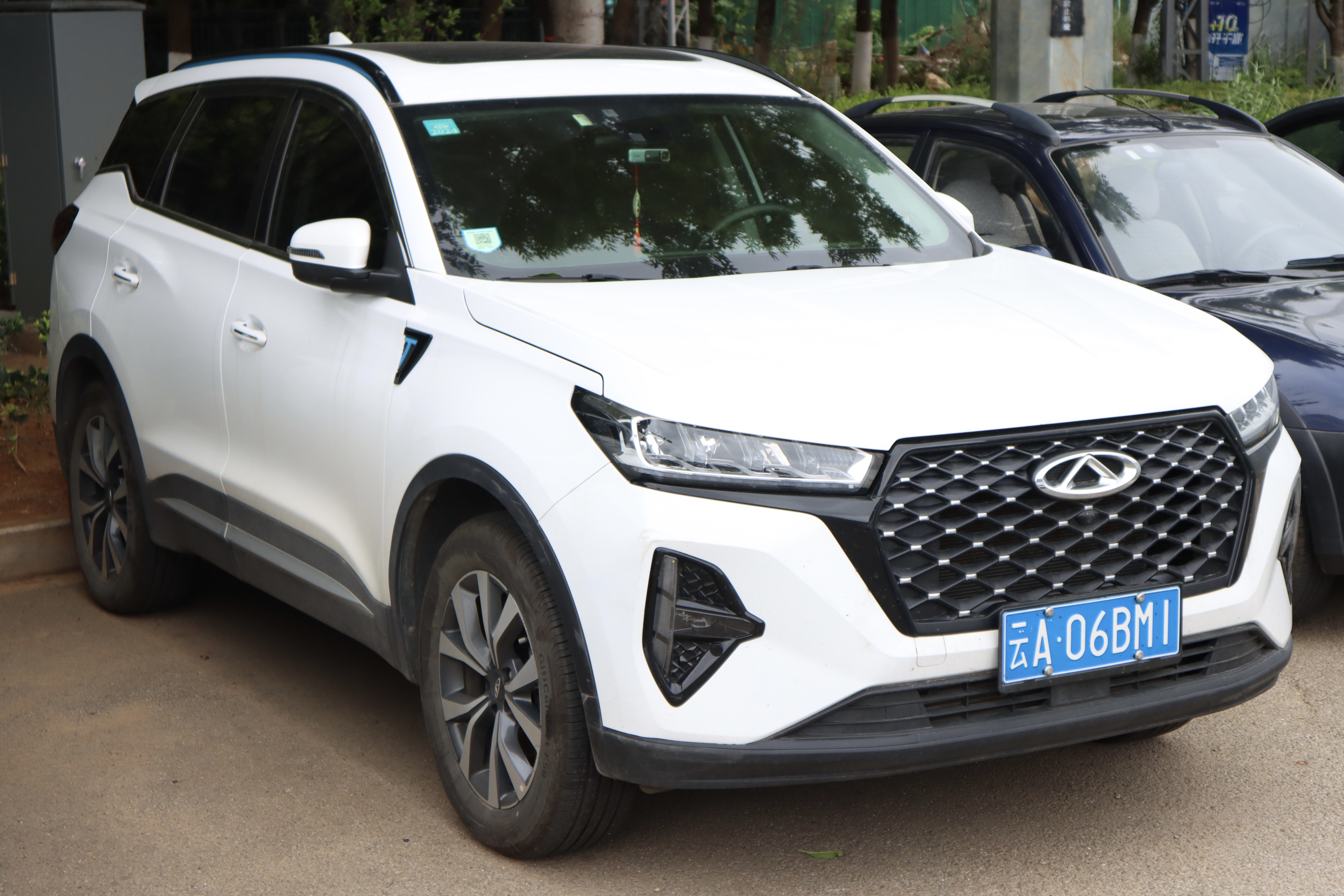
Tiggo 7 Plus

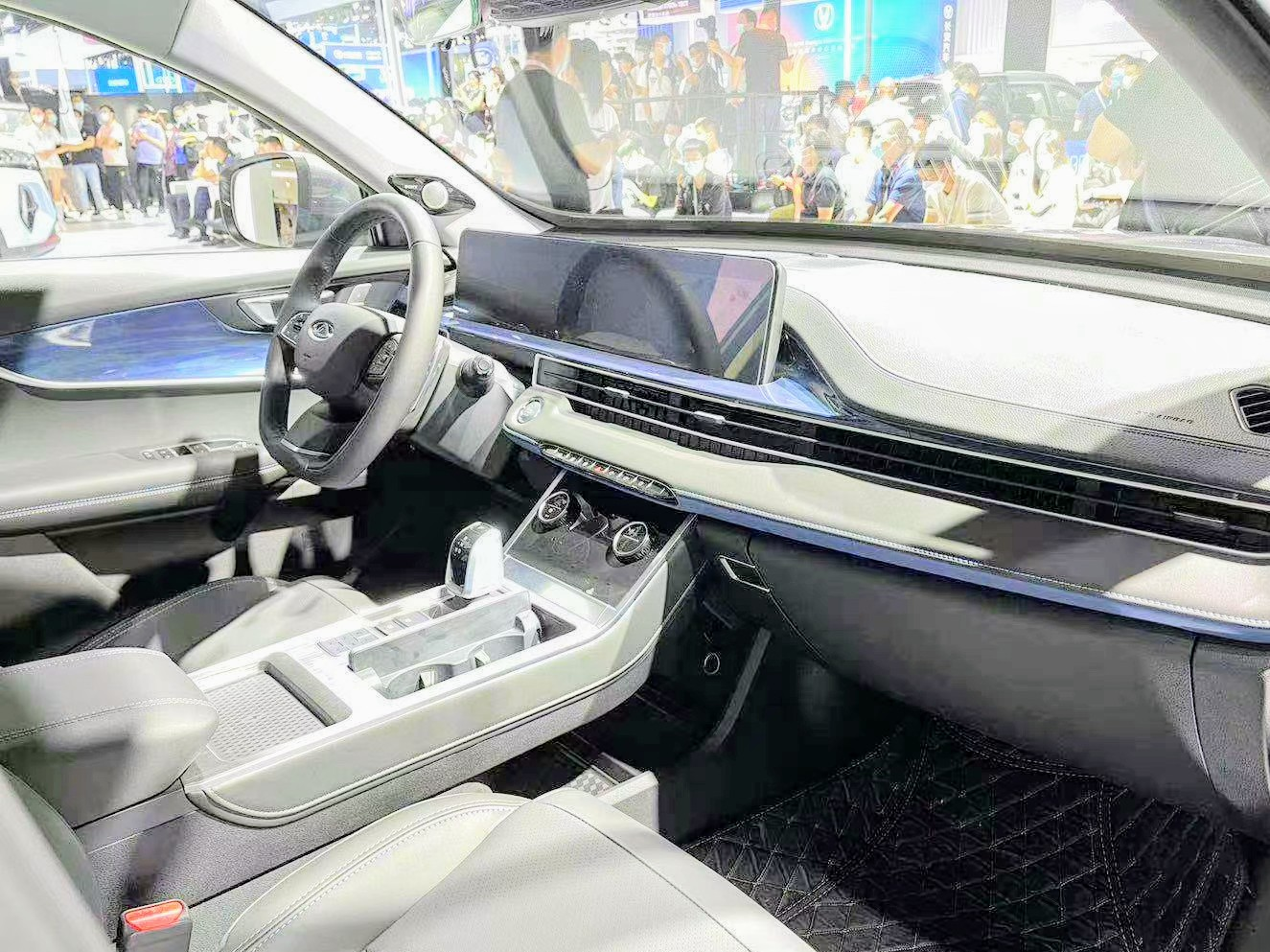
Interior

=== 2023 facelift ===
For the 2023 model year, Chery introduced two different exterior facelifts for the Tiggo 7 series in different respective markets. Both facelifts feature an updated interior design, as well a plug-in hybrid (PHEV) powertrain.

==== China (Tiggo 7 Plus & Tiggo 7 Plus New Energy) ====
The first version of the 2023 facelift was unveiled on 29 September 2022 for the Tiggo 7 Plus, with sales commencing on 7 November 2022. This version is exclusively sold in China; it features a completely redesigned front end, with the headlight units taken from the Tiggo 8 Plus. The plug-in hybrid version was unveiled in August 2022 at the 2022 Chengdu Auto Show, and is marketed under Chery's New Energy series. Sales of the plug-in hybrid model were commenced on 17 March 2023.

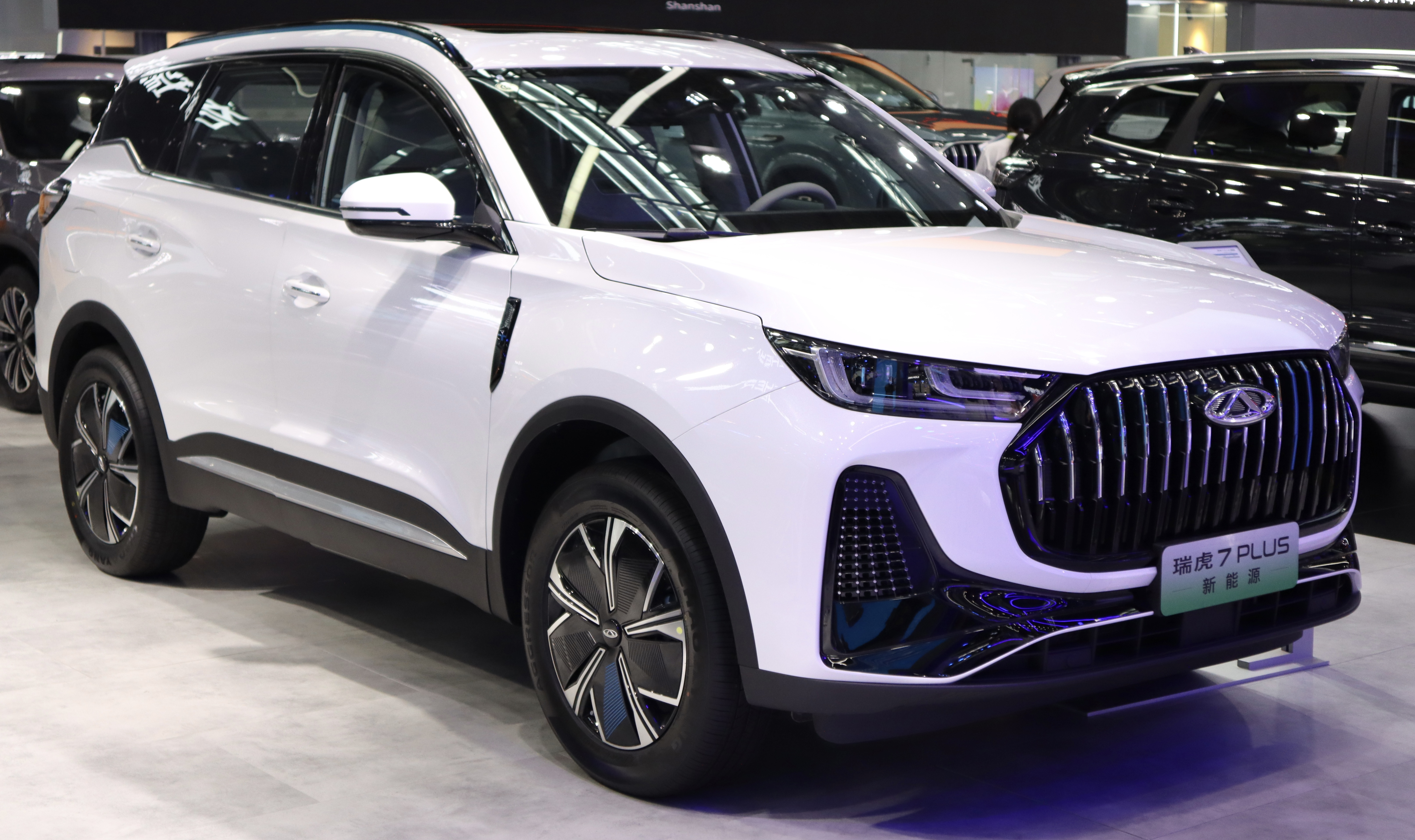
2023 Tiggo 7 Plus New Energy

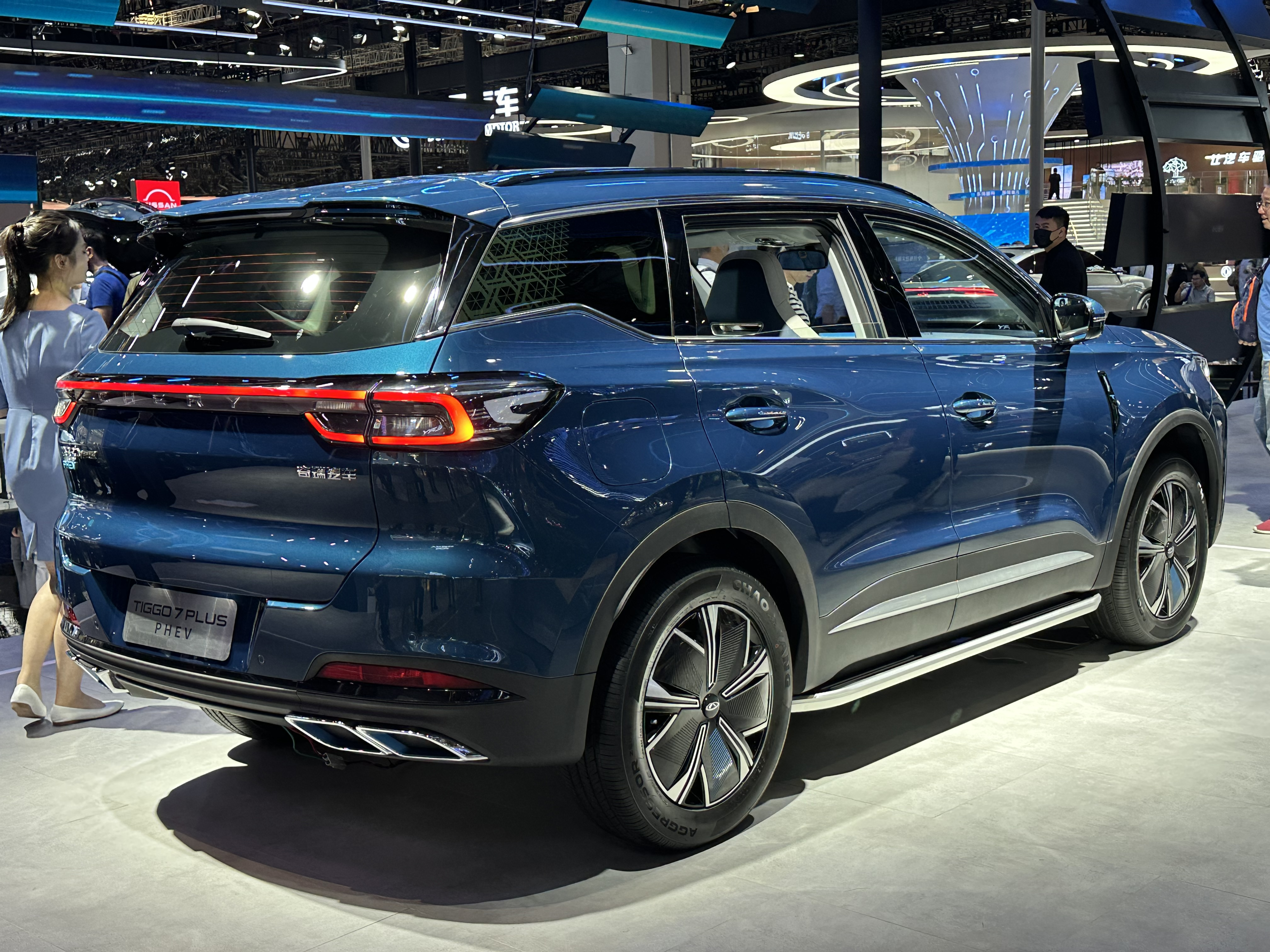
Rear view

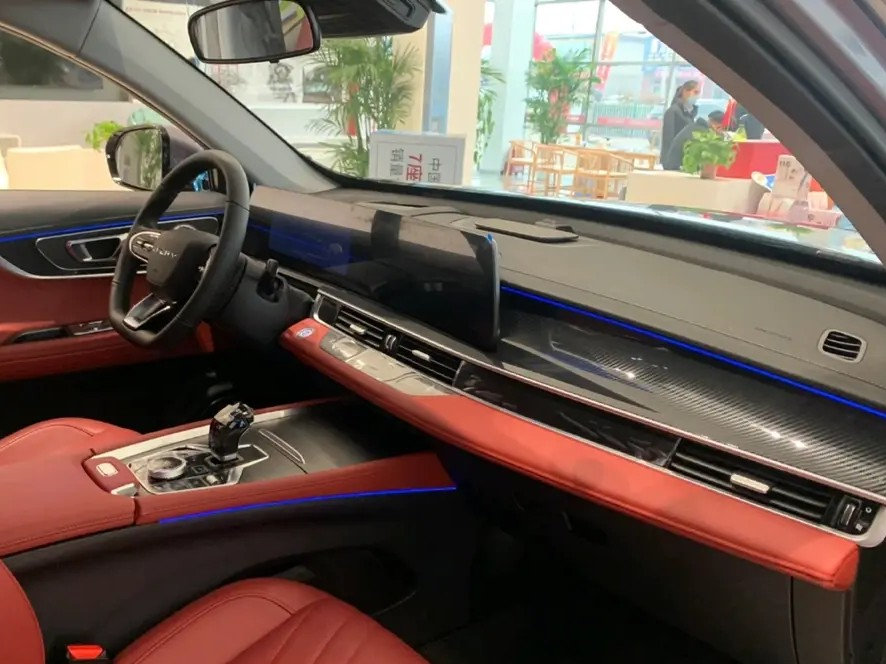
Interior

==== Global (Tiggo 7 series / Chinese-market 2024 Tiggo 7) ====
The second version of the 2023 facelift was showcased multiple times during the first quarter of 2023. This version is sold in select global markets under two different suffixes, depending on the powertrain; Pro Max for the internal-combustion model (except Australia and Malaysia), and Pro e+ for the plug-in hybrid model (except Russia). It is also sold in China as the regular internal-combustion Tiggo 7 since May 2024. This version utilize the exterior design from the Chinese internal-combustion 2021 Plus models, albeit with a redesigned front bumper and an updated grille.

Although global models uses an updated interior design as the first version, the Chinese-market Tiggo 7 adopts the interior design from the pre-facelift internal-combustion 2021 Plus models.

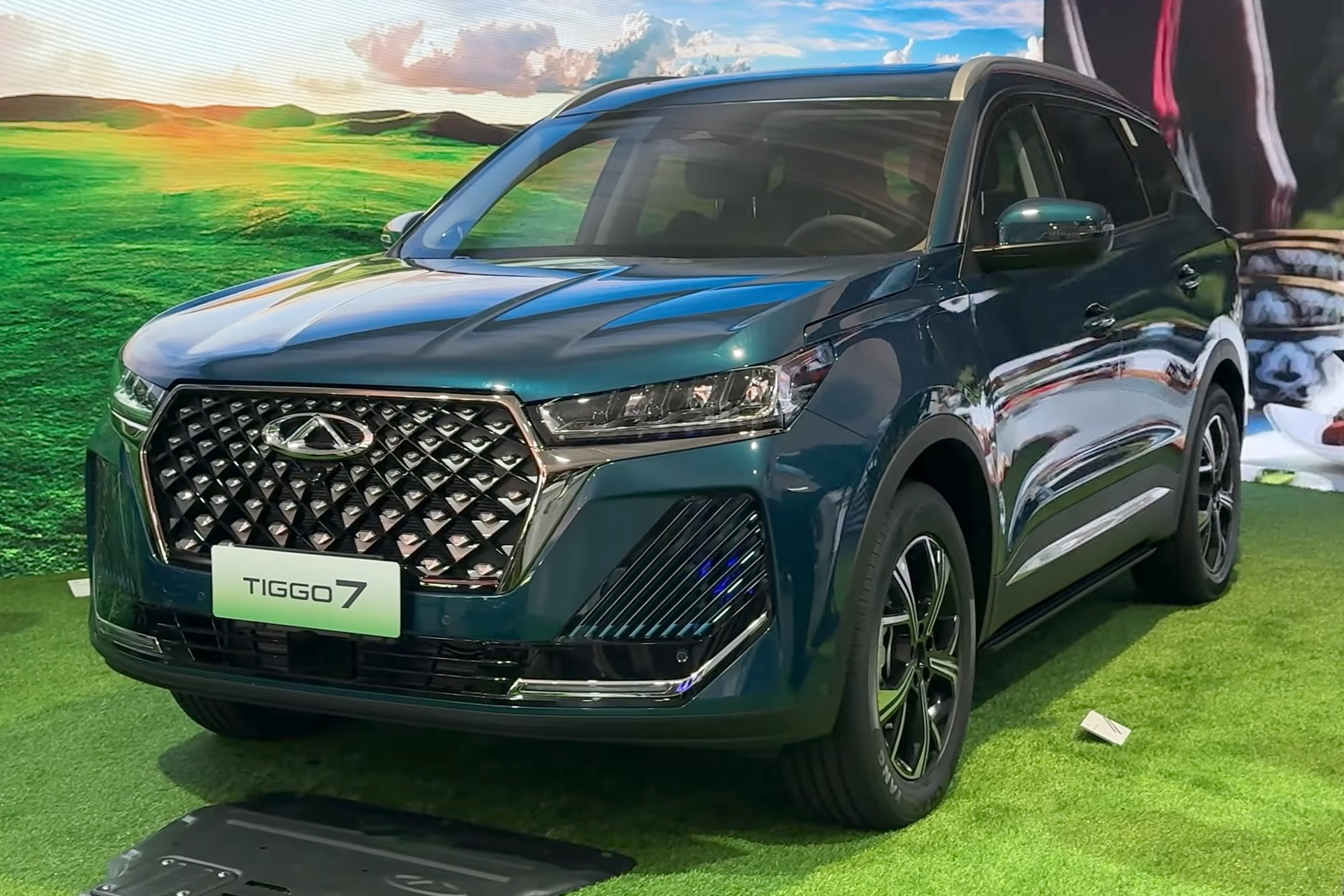
2023 Tiggo 7 (global)

=== 2025 facelift (Global Tiggo 7 series / Chinese-market Tiggo 7 Plus) ===
The second facelift was revealed in April 2024 during the 2024 Chery International Business Conference in Wuhu, Anhui, and is marketed as a 2025 model year vehicle. It borrows the exterior design from the facelifted 2023 Plus models, but features a newly redesigned front bumper, grille and rear fascia. It debuted overseas in May 2024 as the Ebro S700 at the Madrid Car Experience in Spain, while Chinese models were launched on 1 November 2024 as the Tiggo 7 Plus.

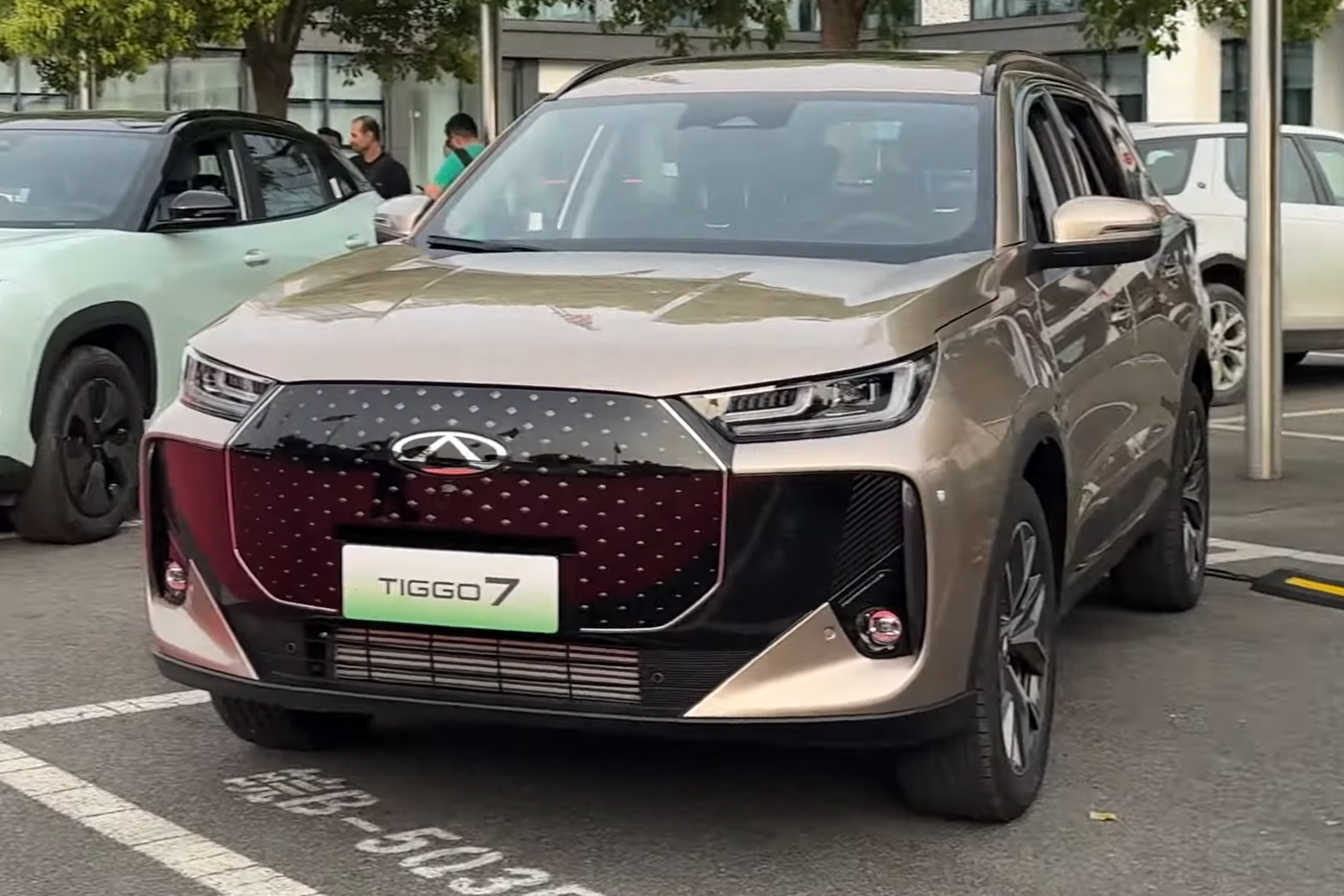
2025 Tiggo 7 (global)

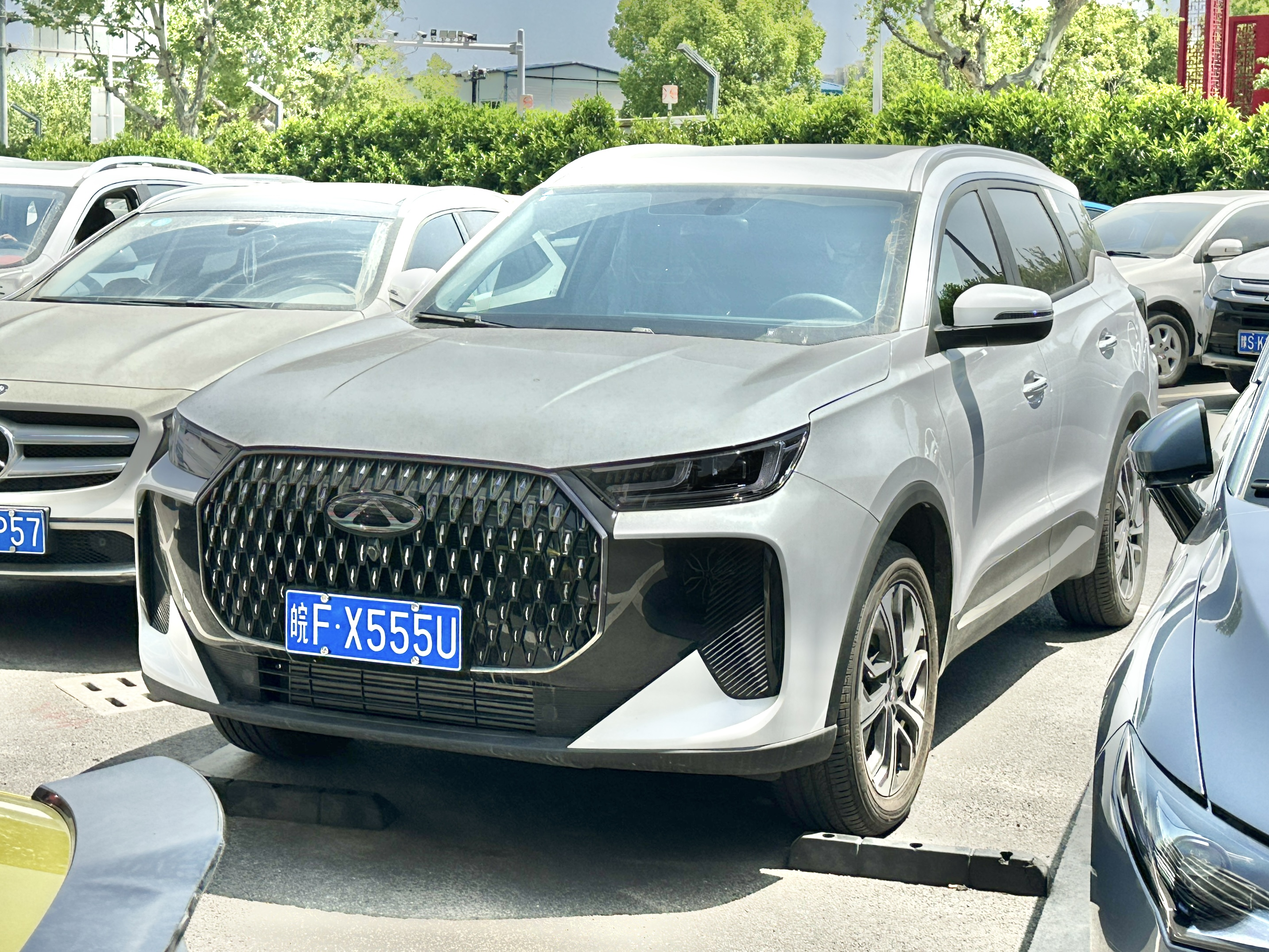
2025 Tiggo 7 Plus (China)

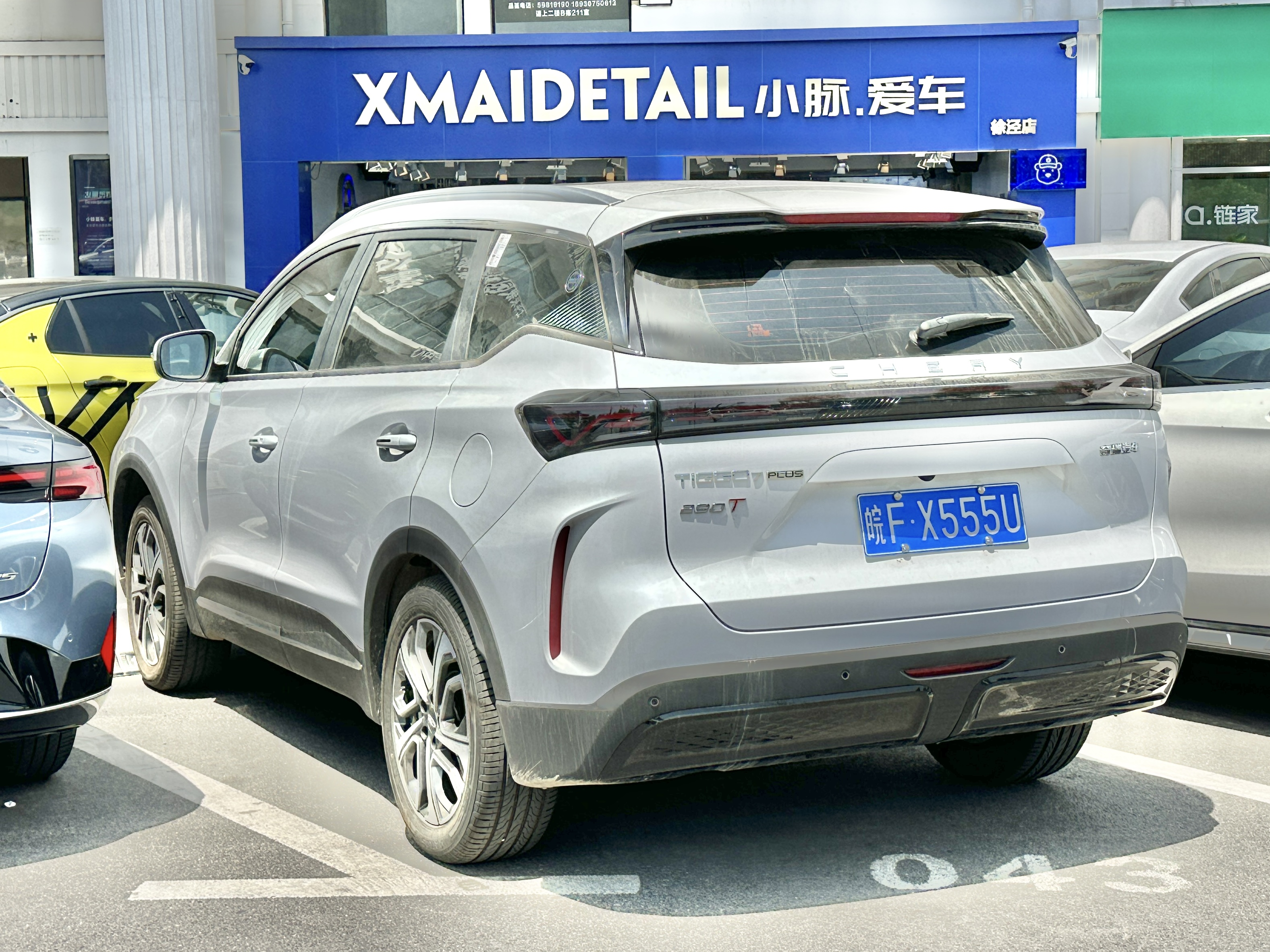
Rear view

=== Powertrain ===
The second-generation Tiggo 7 series is offered with two ACTECO engines; the first option is a 1.5-litre SQRE4T15C TGDI (turbocharged engine with direct fuel injection) engine, badged as the "230T", which is rated at 116 kW (158 PS; 156 hp) and 230 N⋅m (23 kg⋅m; 170 lb⋅ft) of torque. In most markets, the 230T model is mated to a continuously variable transmission (CVT), with a 6-speed manual is available exclusively for the Chinese market. The second option is a 1.6-litre SQRF4J16 TGDI engine (marketed as "Kunpeng Power" in China, starting on the Plus version), badged as the "290T", which is rated at 147 kW (200 PS; 197 hp) and 290 N⋅m (30 kg⋅m; 214 lb⋅ft) of torque. The 290T model is mated to a 7-speed dual-clutch transmission (DCT). For some markets, the 1.6-litre model is available with optional all-wheel drive.

The mild-hybrid (MHEV) powertrain, available since 2021, combines the 1.5-litre turbocharged engine with a 48-volt lithium-ion battery system, mated to a continuously variable transmission (CVT).

The plug-in hybrid (PHEV) powertrain (marketed as "New Energy" in China, and "e+" in select overseas markets), available since 2023, combines the 1.5-litre turbocharged engine with a permanent-magnet synchronous motor (PMSM), mated to a 3-speed dedicated hybrid transmission (DHT), resulting an increase of power output, which is rated at 240 kW (326 PS; 322 hp) and 545 N⋅m (56 kg⋅m; 402 lb⋅ft) of torque, combining for an 80 km (49.7 mi) in electric-only mode.

=== Overseas markets ===
Depending on the market and specifications, the second-generation Tiggo 7 is exported with different prefixes applied, notably Pro and Pro Max. Plug-in hybrid models were exported under the Pro e+ prefix (except Russia), and later since 2025, Chery Super Hybrid (CSH).

==== Australia ====
The Australian-market Tiggo 7 Pro was introduced in August 2023, with prices announced in September 2023. Available grades initially were the Urban, Elite and Ultimate. It is only available with a 1.6-litre turbocharged petrol engine, available in front-wheel drive (Urban and Elite) or all-wheel drive (Ultimate). For the Australian market, the Tiggo 7 Pro adopts the exterior and interior design from the global-market 2023 facelifted models.

In February 2025, for the 2025 model year, the line-up received minor exterior styling changes, with the Urban and Elite grades were respectively replaced by the SE and SE+ grades. The Ultimate grade was dropped from the line-up.

In June 2025, the plug-in hybrid version with the 1.5-litre turbocharged petrol plug-in hybrid (PHEV) with front-wheel drive, marketed as the Super Hybrid went on sale in Australia with customer deliveries commenced in July 2025, the Super Hybrid version is available for the Urban and Ultimate grades. At the time of its introduction, the Tiggo 7 Super Hybrid was the cheapest plug-in hybrid vehicle (PHEV) on sale in Australia.

The facelifted Tiggo 7 line-up, based on the Chinese market Tiggo 7 Plus, was launched in Australia on 28 August 2025 for the 2026 model year, with the Pro suffix dropped from the nameplate. The 2026 facelifted model saw the SE and SE+ grades were respectively replaced by the Urban and Ultimate grades, the 1.6-litre turbocharged petrol was replaced with the 1.5-litre turbocharged petrol engine paired with a 6-speed dual-clutch transmission, the rear suspension uses an independent multi-link suspension, and the omission of features such as the driver's knee airbag, a full-size spare wheel (replaced with a space-saver wheel), integrated satellite navigation and Sony audio system (replaced with six unbranded speakers).

==== Brunei ====
The Tiggo 7 was introduced alongside with the Tiggo Cross in Brunei on 11 September 2026, marking the return of Chery brand in the Bruneian market after 13 years of hiatus. The Tiggo 7 is available in sole plug-in hybrid (PHEV) variant based on the Chinese market version of Tiggo 7 Plus.

==== Europe ====
The Tiggo 7 was released in the European market in June 2025, starting in Poland. For Europe, it is available with either 1.6-litre (T-GDi) turbocharged petrol and 1.5-litre turbocharged petrol plug-in hybrid (Super Hybrid) powertrains.

==== Indonesia ====
First introduced on 28 January 2022, The Tiggo 7 Pro was launched in Indonesia on 23 November 2022, alongside the Tiggo 8 Pro, as Chery's first models in the country after a six-year absence. Sales were commenced in January 2023. Adopting the exterior design from the Chinese internal-combustion 2021 Plus models, the Indonesian market Tiggo 7 Pro is offered with three variants, namely the Comfort, Luxury and Premium. It is only available with the 1.5-litre turbocharged petrol engine. It is locally assembled at Handal Indonesia Motor's facility in Bekasi, West Java. In May 2026, the Tiggo 7 Pro was discontinued in Indonesia due to low sales and Chery had shifted focus on marketing newer products.

==== Malaysia ====
The Malaysian-market Tiggo 7 Pro was revealed on 25 March 2024, with sales commencing on 21 June 2024. A pre-production model, featuring the exterior design from the Chinese internal-combustion 2021 Tiggo 7 Plus, was first showcased in October 2022 at Chery's Malaysian re-introduction event in Setia Alam to mark its initial Malaysian debut. Only available as a single unnamed variant and powered by a 1.6-litre turbocharged petrol engine, the Malaysian model adopts the exterior and interior design from the global-market 2023 facelifted models. It is locally assembled at Inokom's facility in Kulim, Kedah.

The plug-in hybrid version with the 1.5-litre turbocharged petrol plug-in hybrid (PHEV), based on the Chinese market Tiggo 7 Plus, was launched in Malaysia on 3 October 2025 in the sole variant. Like the petrol model, the PHEV model is locally assembled in Kulim, Kedah.

==== Mexico ====
In Mexico, the Tiggo 7 Pro is marketed under the Chirey brand. It was launched in July 2022, alongside the Tiggo 8 Pro Max. Available trim levels include the Comfort and Luxury. It is only available with the 1.5-litre turbocharged petrol engine. In July 2025, the plug-in hybrid version with the 1.5-litre turbocharged petrol plug-in hybrid (PHEV) with front-wheel drive, marketed as the Chery Super Hybrid (CSH) went on sale in Mexico, the CSH version is available for the Premium trim.

==== Philippines ====
In the Philippines, the Tiggo 7 Pro was launched in January 2021, which replaces the first-generation Tiggo 7. It is only available with a single engine option; a 1.5-litre turbocharged engine, initially as a conventional petrol model. A hybrid variant of the same engine featuring a 48-volt mild-hybrid system was added in July 2023.

==== Russia ====
The Tiggo 7 Pro was launched in Russia on 10 September 2020. Variants include the Luxury, Elite and Prestige, with the 1.5-litre turbocharged petrol engine is standard across the line-up.

The Pro Max version, based on the Chinese internal-combustion 2021 Plus model, was launched in January 2023. Initial variants were the Prestige and Ultimate, while its initial engine option was carried over from the Pro version. The Elite variant was added in May 2023. In July 2023, the 1.6-litre turbocharged petrol engine option, only available with all-wheel drive, was added to the line-up, and is only available on the Elite and Ultimate. The Pro Max version received a facelift in June 2024, sporting the exterior and interior design from the global-market 2023 facelifted models.

The plug-in hybrid version with the 1.5-litre turbocharged petrol plug-in hybrid (PHEV), was launched in October 2023, alongside the Tiggo 8 Pro e+. Unlike other markets and the latter model launched alongside it, it is marketed there simply as the Tiggo 7 Pro Plug-In Hybrid, thus omitting the e+ moniker. The exterior adopts the front bumper, grille and plug-in hybrid wheel design from the global-market 2023 facelifted models, while the interior uses the same design found on the Chinese internal-combustion 2021 Plus models, sharing that to the Russian 2023 Pro Max models.

The Pro version was discontinued in April 2024.

==== South Africa ====
The Tiggo 7 Pro went on sale in South Africa in May 2022. Variants include the Distinction and Executive. The Pro version uses the exterior design from the Chinese internal-combustion 2021 Plus models, and is only available with the 1.5-litre turbocharged petrol engine.

The Pro Max version was introduced in August 2023 at the 2023 Kyalami Festival of Motoring, featuring the exterior and interior design from the global-market 2023 facelifted models, with sales commencing in October 2023. It is initially available with two variants mirroring the Pro version: Distinction and Executive. The Pro Max version uses the 1.6-litre turbocharged petrol engine, available in front-wheel drive (all variants) or all-wheel drive (Executive). The Premium variant, available in front-wheel drive or all-wheel drive, was added in April 2024.

In June 2025, the plug-in hybrid version with the 1.5-litre turbocharged petrol plug-in hybrid (PHEV) with front-wheel drive, marketed as the Chery Super Hybrid (CSH) went on sale in South Africa, the CSH version is available for the Plus and Ultra trims. At the time of its introduction, the Tiggo 7 CSH was the cheapest plug-in hybrid vehicle (PHEV) on sale in South Africa.

The facelifted Tiggo 7 line-up, based on the Chinese market Tiggo 7 Plus, was launched in South Africa on 22 July 2025, with the Pro suffix dropped from the nameplate. Three variants were available: Prime, Prestige and Legacy. The Prime variant use the 1.5-litre turbocharged petrol engine, while the Prestige and Legacy variants use the 1.6-litre turbocharged petrol engine. The facelifted model did not affect the Pro Max and the CSH versions. In April 2026, the Executive variant using the 1.5-litre turbocharged petrol engine was added to the line-up.

=== Rebranded versions ===
==== Ebro S700 ====
Following a partnership agreement with Chery in the first quarter of 2024, Spanish manufacturer Ebro produced and sold a licensed-built second-generation Tiggo 7 under the company's resurrected namesake brand, called the Ebro S700. It was unveiled in May 2024 at the Madrid Car Experience, and went on sale for the Spanish market in December 2024. Based on the global-market facelifted 2025 Tiggo 7 models, initial variants were the Comfort and Luxury. Initial engine option is a 1.6-litre turbocharged petrol, with the 1.5-litre turbocharged petrol plug-in hybrid (PHEV) will be available later in 2025. It is assembled at the former Nissan Motor Ibérica plant in Barcelona, with the first units rolling out on 25 September 2024.

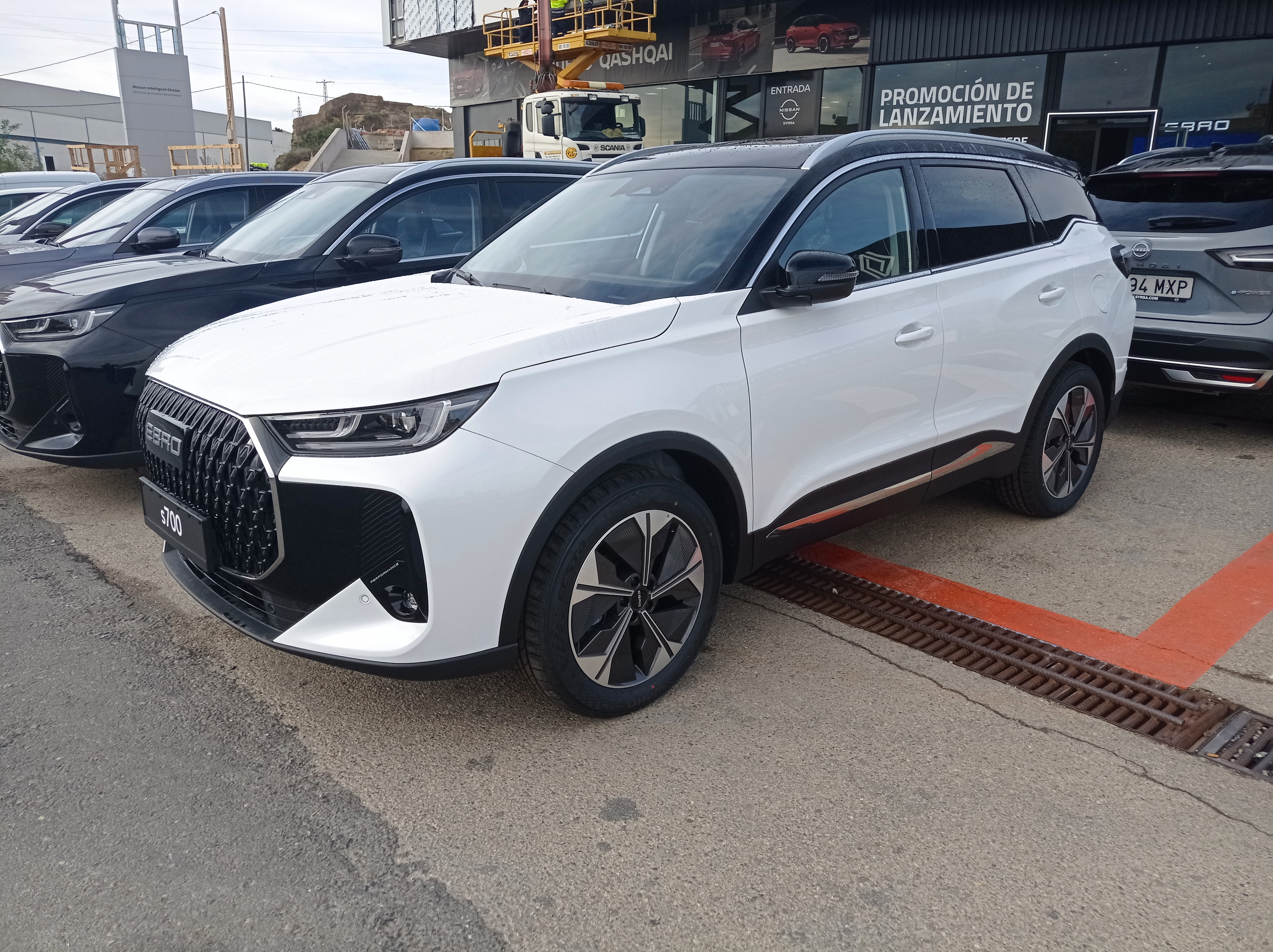
Ebro S700

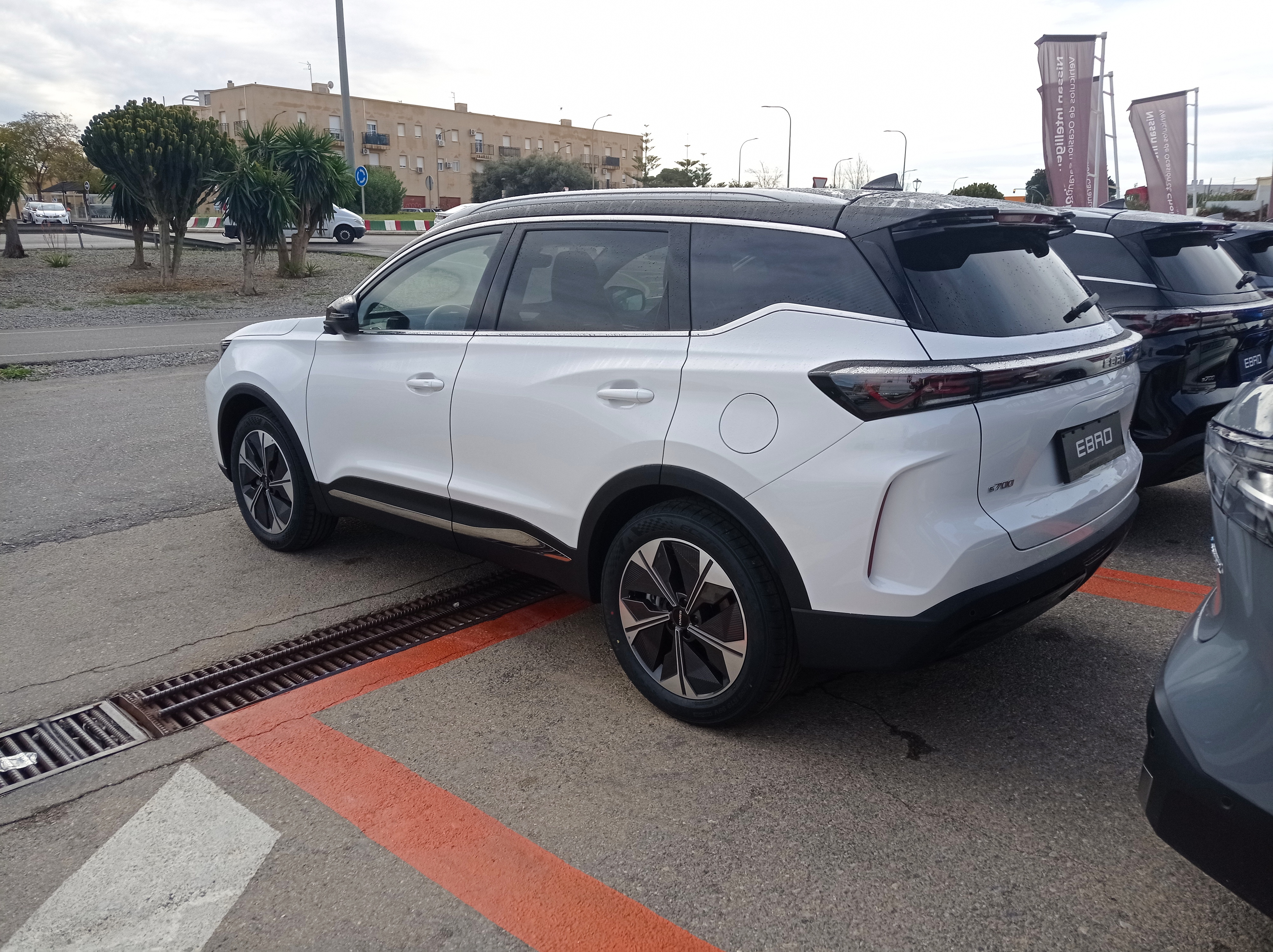
Rear view

==== DR 6.0 ====
DR Automobiles marketed the second-generation Tiggo 7 in Italy as the DR 6.0, which was launched on 20 April 2022. It is only available with a 1.5-litre turbocharged engine, available with either a conventional petrol or DR's Thermohybrid bi-fuel (petrol/LPG) setup.

A 1.6-litre turbocharged engine option, based on the Chinese internal-combustion 2021 Tiggo 7 Plus and marketed as the 6.0 T-GDI, was made available since 2024. A plug-in hybrid model, based on the global-market 2023 Tiggo 7 Pro e+/Plug-In Hybrid, was also made available at the same time.

Apart from different badgings, all DR 6.0 models feature a different front grille pattern design.

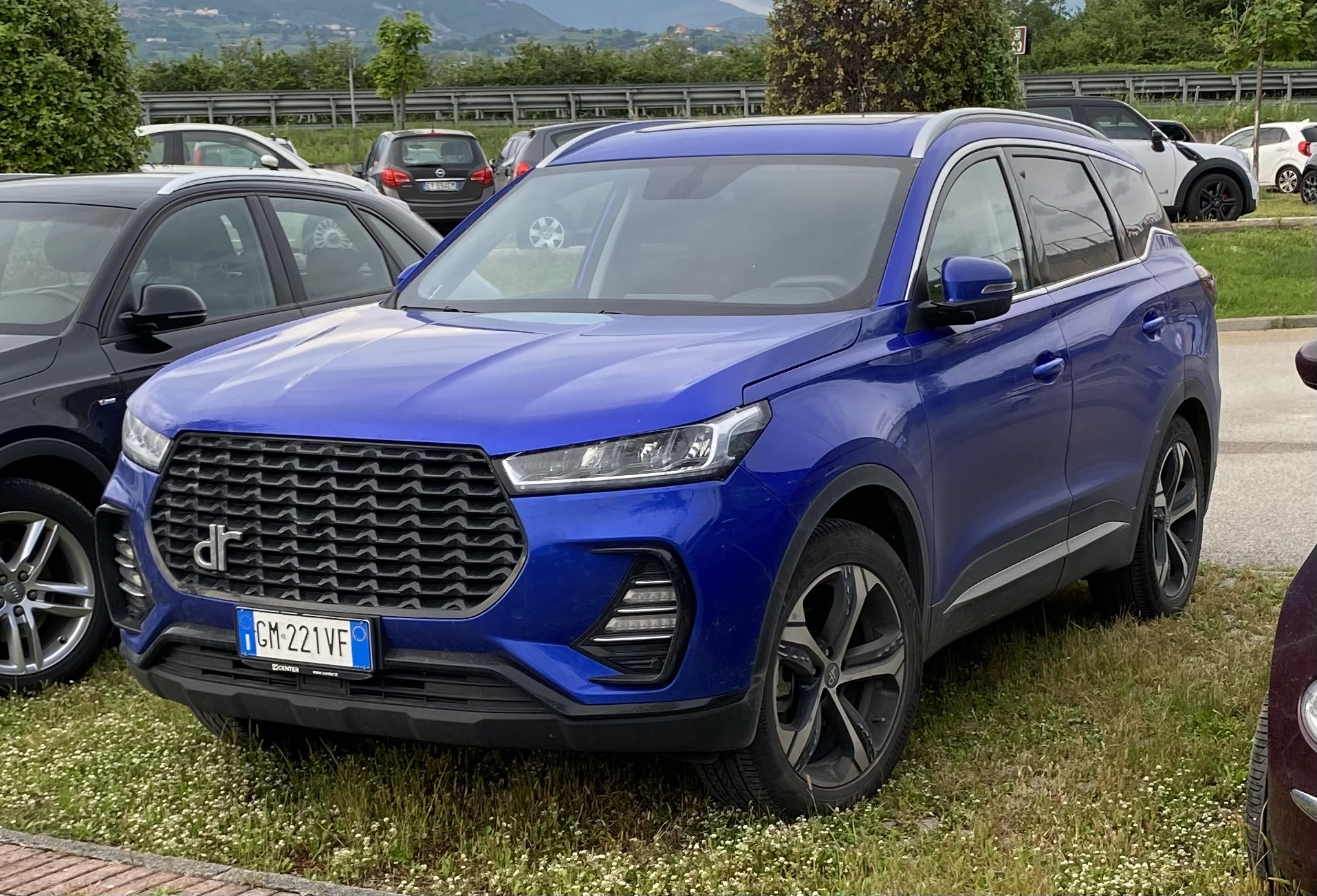
DR 6.0

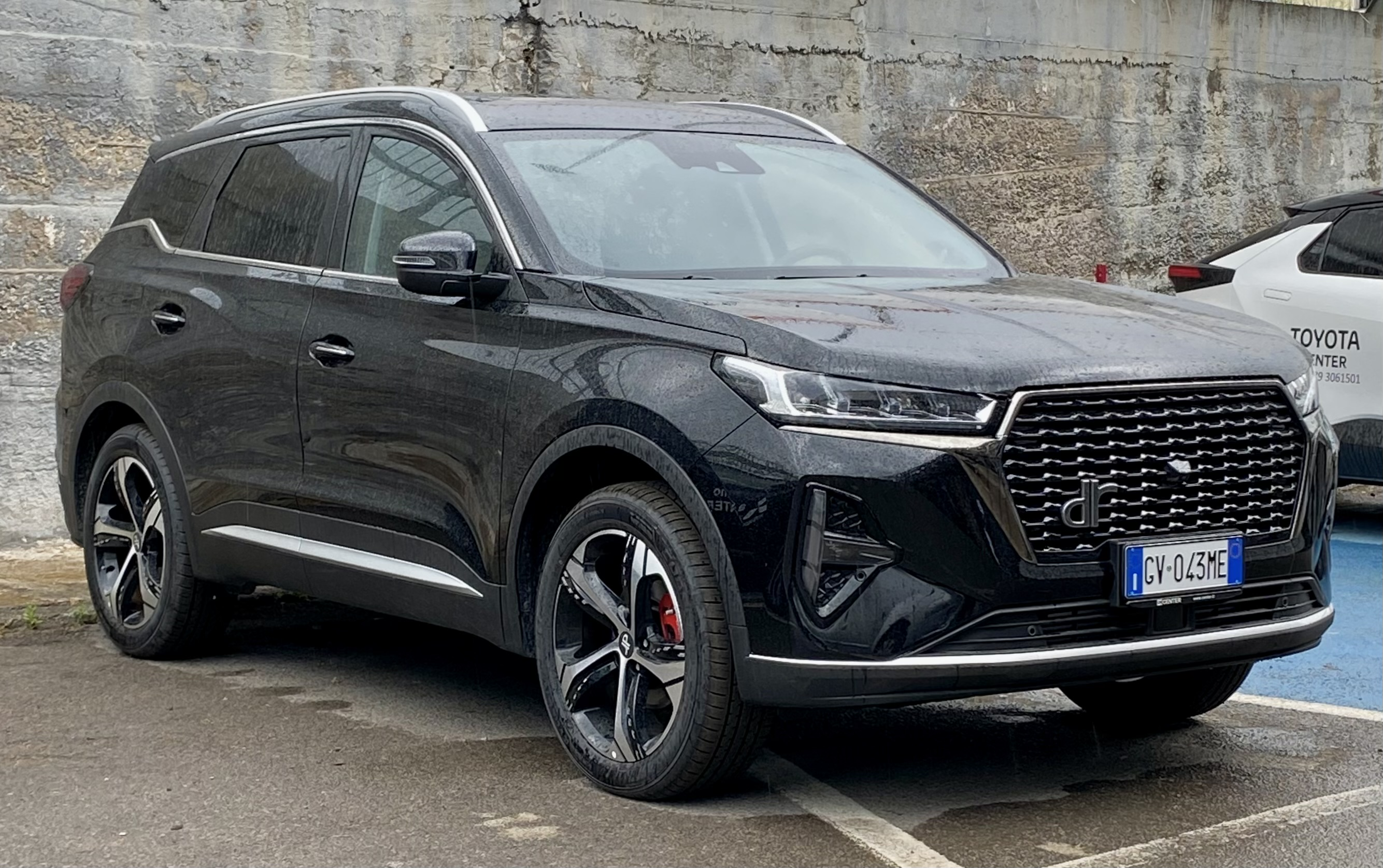
DR 6.0 T-GDI

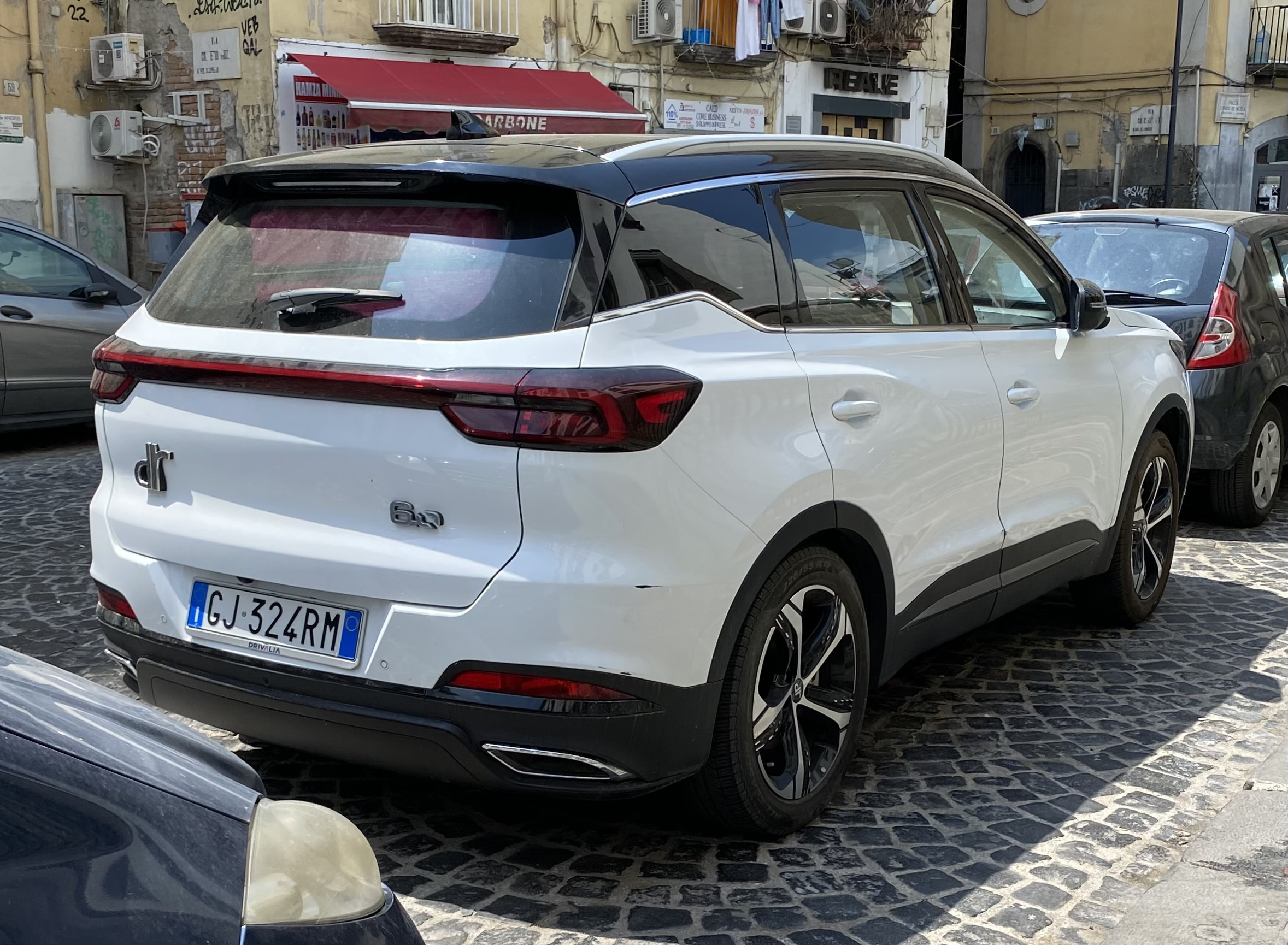
Rear view (6.0)

==== Sportequipe 6 ====
Sportequipe, a subsidiary of DR Automobiles, sold a version of the second-generation Tiggo 7 as the Sportequipe 6 since 2023, which was first revealed in June 2022 at the 2022 Milano Monza Open-Air Motor Show. The model sported the front fascia design from the non-Pro/Plus versions of the Tiggo 8, while sharing the same engine option, as well supply options, as the regular DR 6.0.

A plug-in hybrid model, based on the global-market 2023 Tiggo 7 Pro e+/Plug-In Hybrid, was made available since 2024, positioned as a sportier alternative to the DR 6.0 PHEV. The plug-in hybrid version sported the same front fascia design as the Tiggo 8 Pro/Plus.

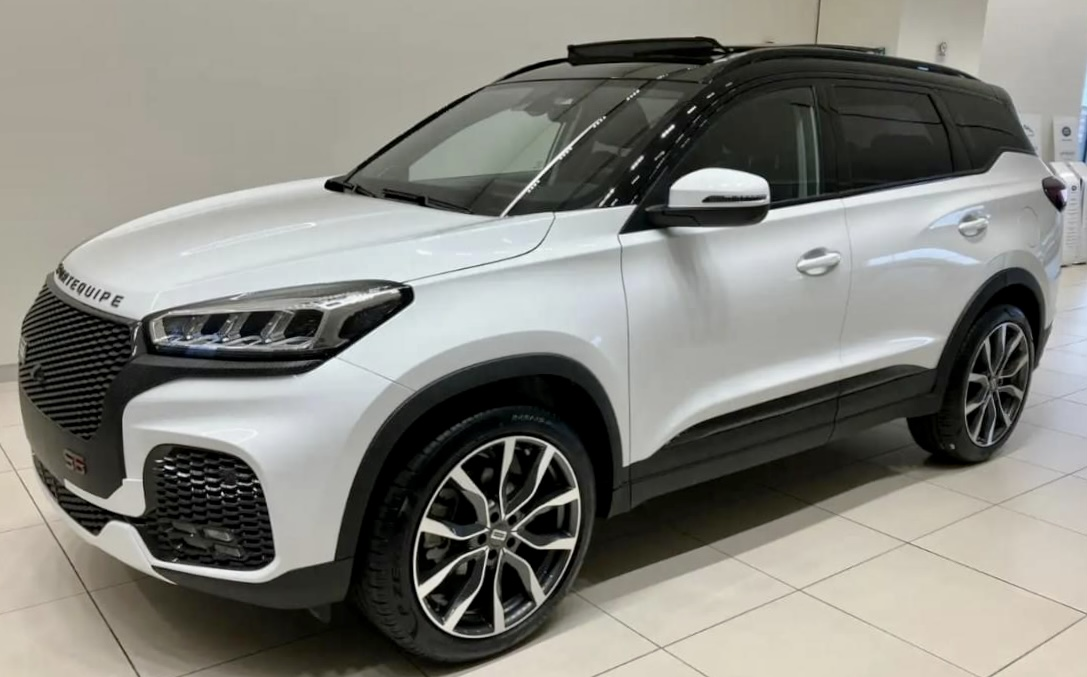
Sportequipe 6

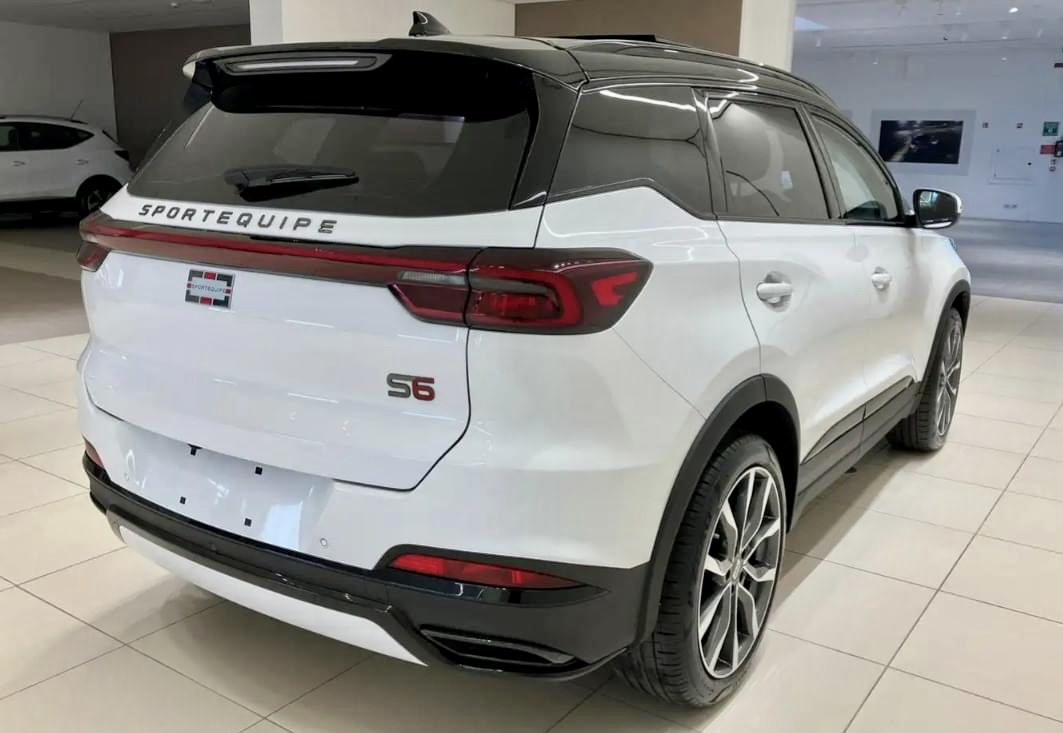
Rear view

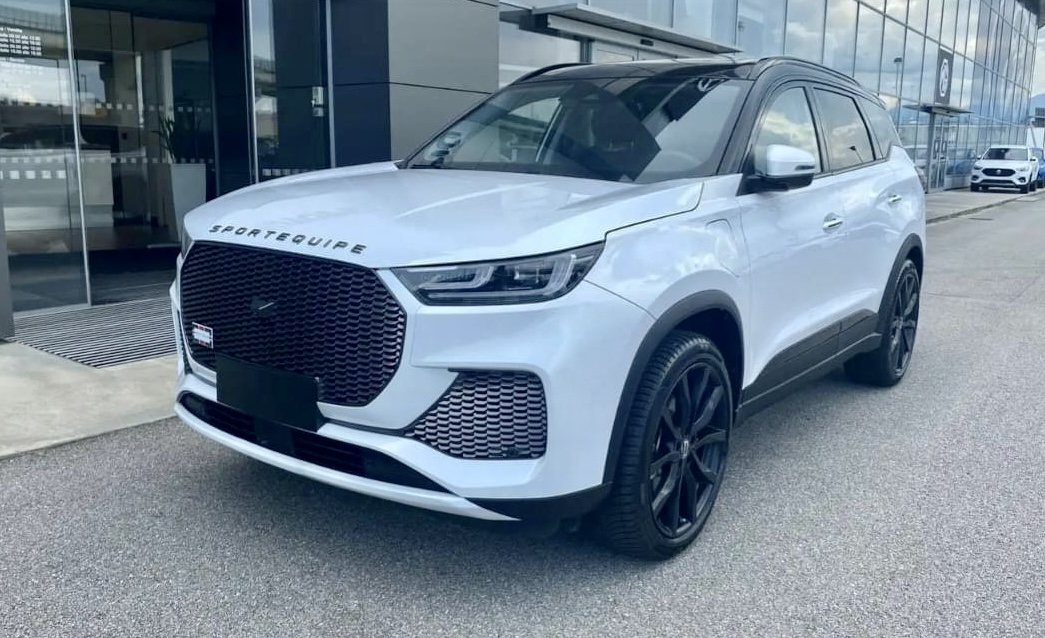
Sportequipe 6 PHEV

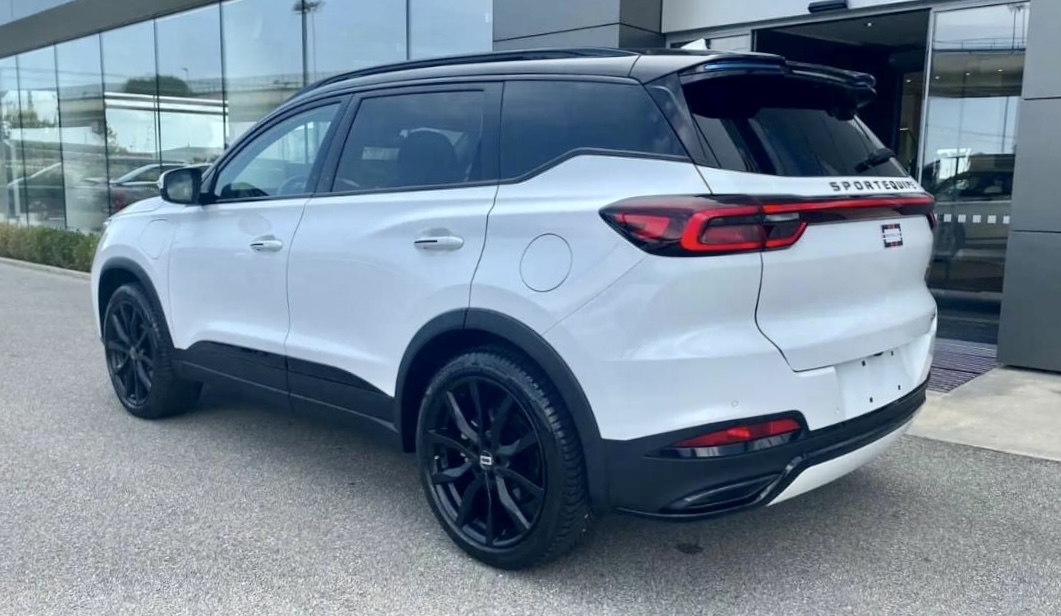
Rear view (PHEV)

==== Fownix Tiggo 7/F7 ====
The second generation Chery Tiggo 7 was released in the Iranian market in 2021 by Modiran Vehicle Manufacturing Company (MVM) as the Fownix Tiggo 7 Pro. Due to international sanctions against Iran, this car was sold under the Fownix brand (instead of Chery). Tiggo 7 Pro is equipped with the same 1.5-liter turbocharged 157 hp engine, but the gearbox installed on it is a new generation of CVTs. In 2023 winter, MVM introduced a new type called "Premium" which is exactly the same as the "Excellent" type in the technical part, but in terms of features, it is equipped with 6 new options, which are: front parking sensor, rain sensor, mirror Electrochromic Center, Blind Spot Radar (BSD), Lane Determining Radar (LDW) and Reverse Collision Radar (RCTA).

Two years after the introduction of the Tiggo 7 Pro, Fownix unveiled Fownix Tiggo 7 Pro Max in December 2023. Tiggo 7 Pro Max uses a 1.6-liter T-GDI engine that is capable of producing a maximum power of 197 horsepower and 290 Nm of torque, which can transfer the generated power to the front wheels with the help of a 7-speed dual-clutch gearbox. The combined consumption of this engine is about 7.8 liters per 100 km, considering the car's net weight of 1526 kg.

In 2025 summer, MVM renamed this series as Fownix F7 Pro and Fownix F7 Pro Max.

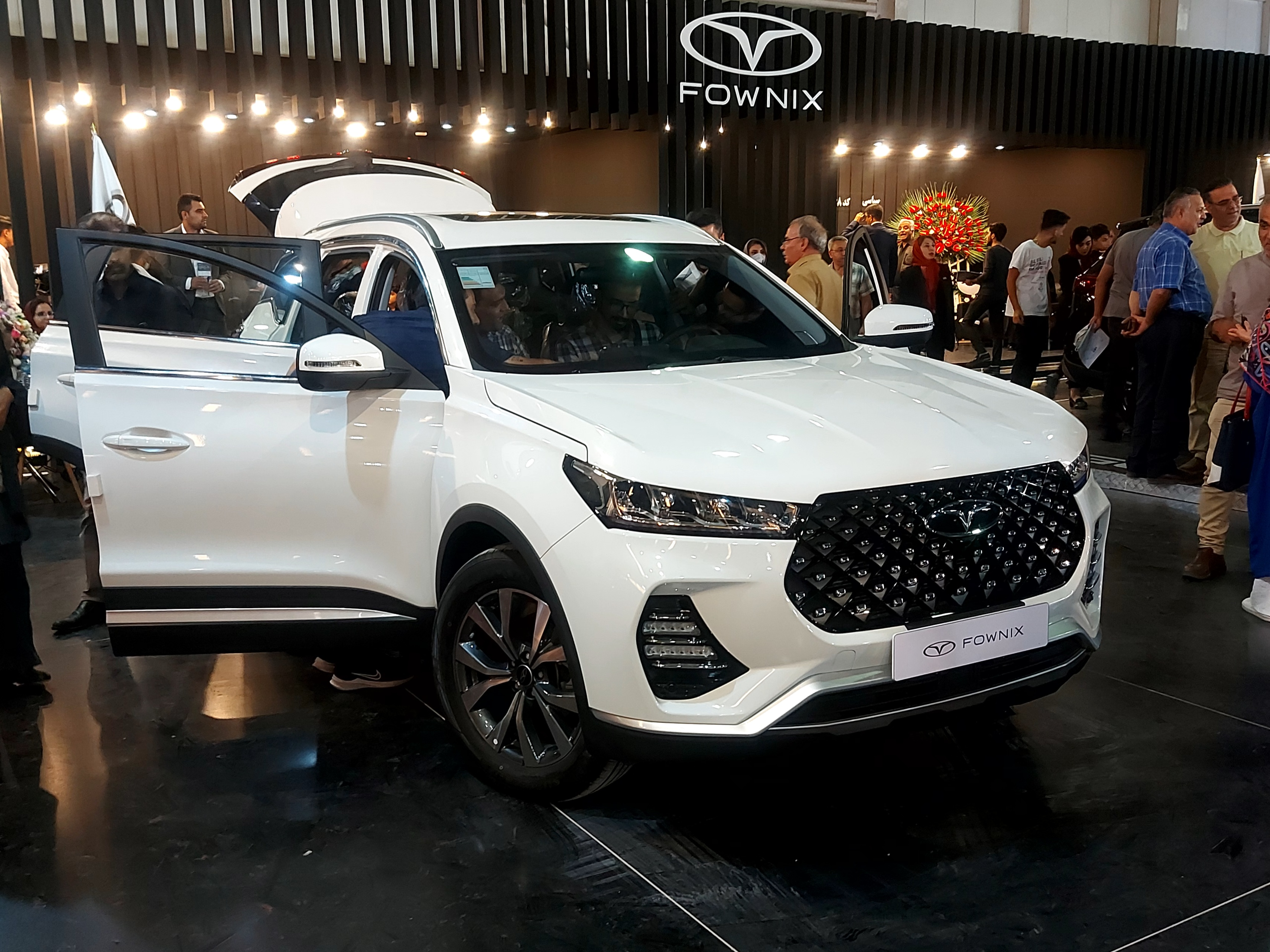
Fownix Tiggo 7 Pro

==== Xcite X-Cross 7 ====
In Russia, the second-generation Tiggo 7 is produced and sold by AvtoVAZ under the Xcite brand, called the Xcite X-Cross 7. The vehicle was revealed on 13 March 2024, with sales commencing in May 2024, as the brand's first model. The vehicle is essentially an indirect follow-up to the Russian-market Tiggo 7 Pro, which Chery later discontinued the model about a month after the Xcite model was unveiled. It retain the same specification and design styling from the former Chery model, including the carried-over 1.5-litre turbocharged petrol engine. Aside on having Xcite badges, the X-Cross 7 sported the same front grille pattern design as that used by Italy's regular DR 6.0. It is initially available with two variants: Enjoy and Techno. It is assembled at AvtoVAZ's Avtozavod plant in Saint Petersburg, which was previously owned by Nissan.

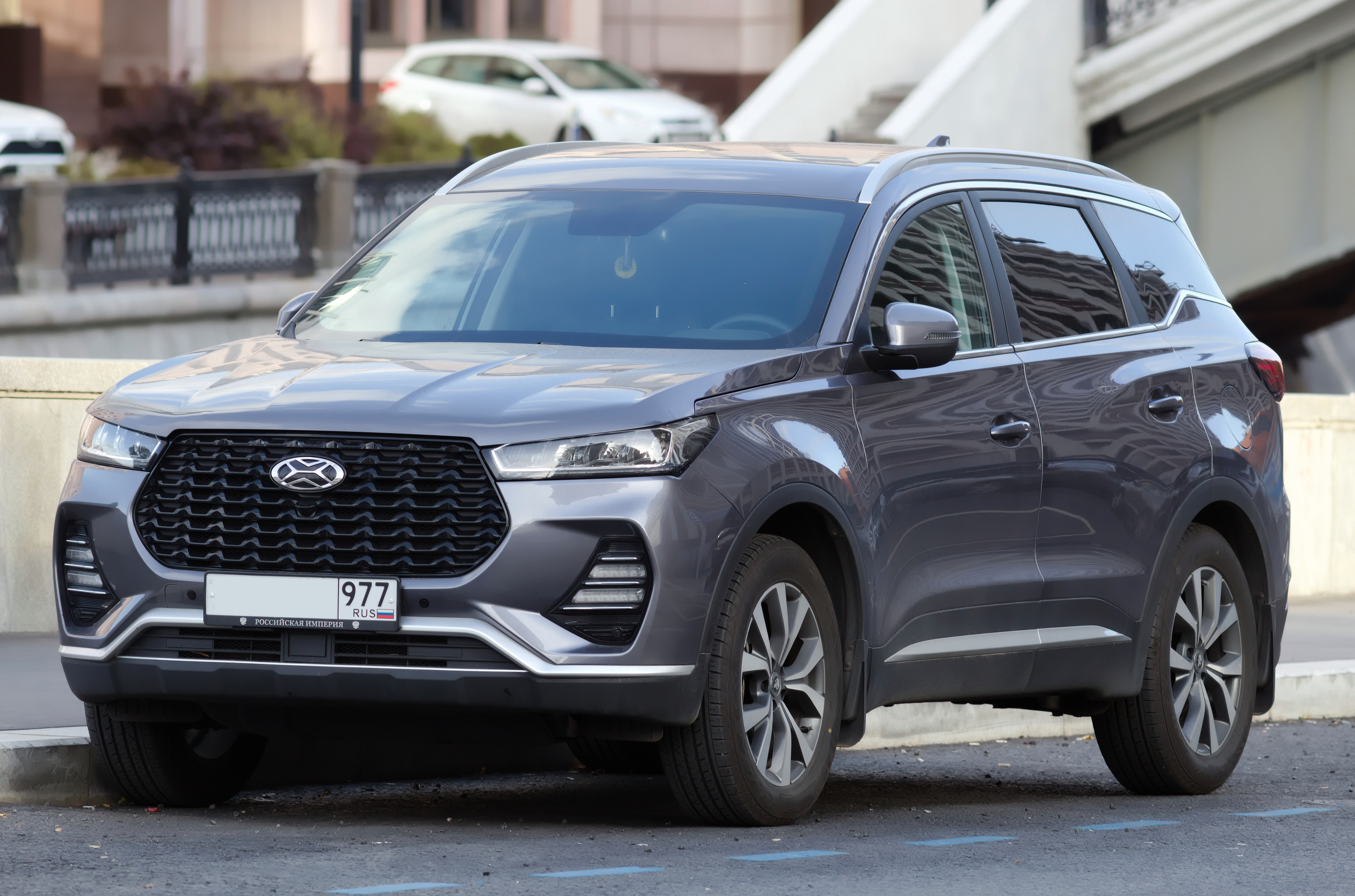
Xcite X-Cross 7

==== Tenet T7 ====
Also, the second-generation Tiggo 7 is sold in Russia under the Tenet T7 name since September 2025. It is initially available with two variants: Active and Prime. The T7 is assembled at AGR plant in Kaluga, which was previously owned by Volkswagen.

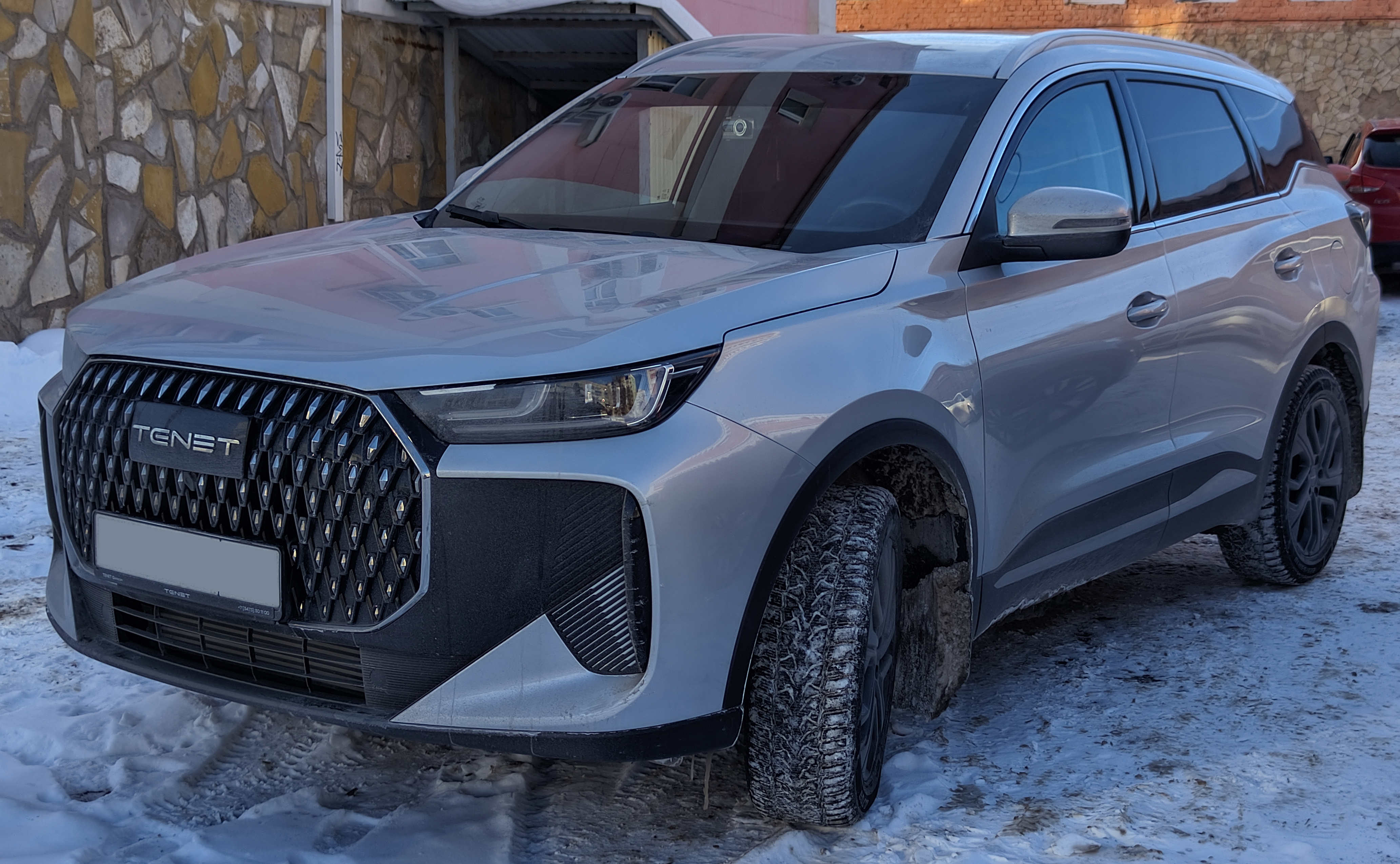
Tenet T7

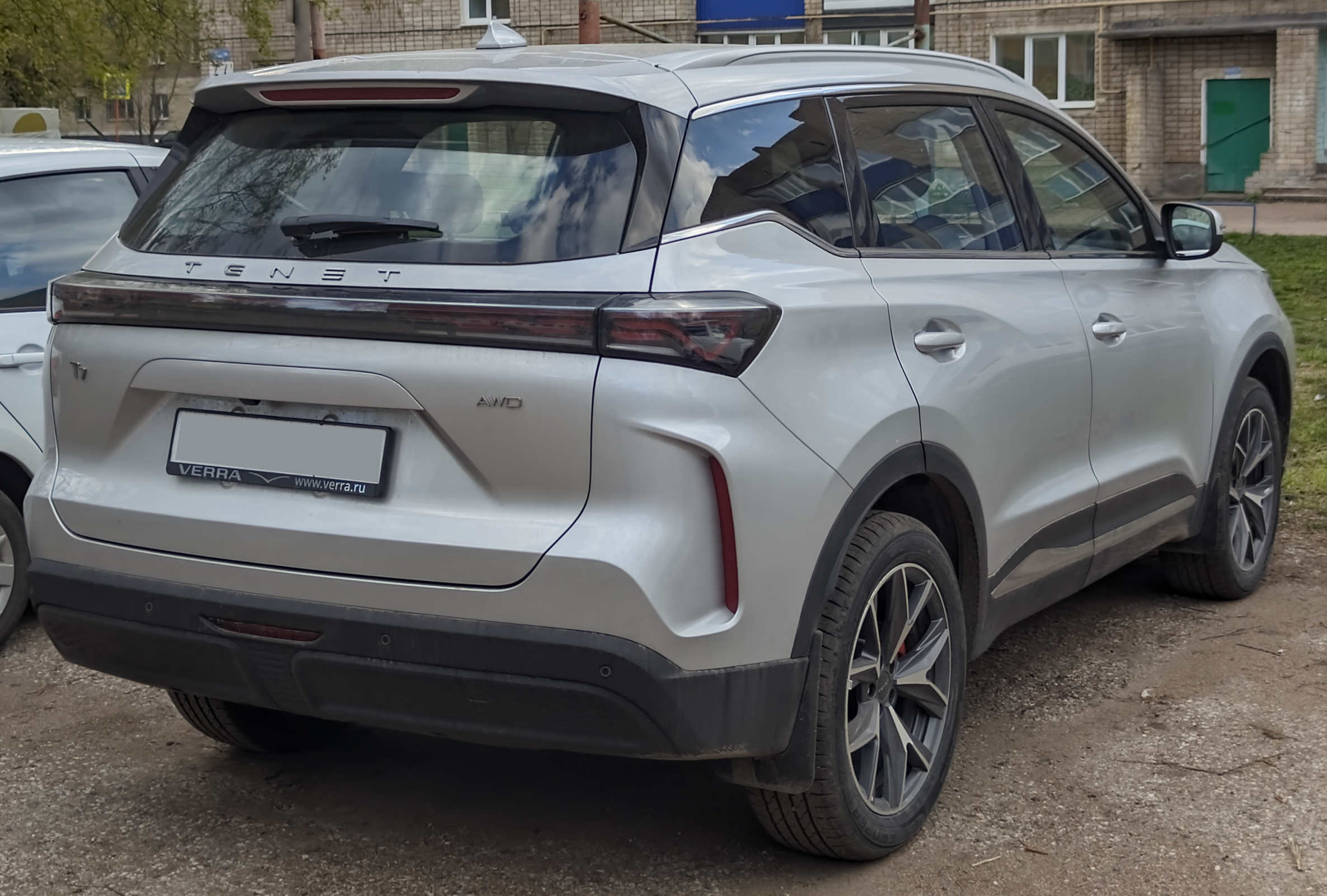
Tenet T7 rear

=== Safety ===
==== ANCAP ====
ANCAP test results Chery Tiggo 7 Pro (2023, aligned with Euro NCAP)
Test	Points	%
Overall:	5 /5 stars	
Adult occupant:	35.52	88%
Child occupant:	42.74	87%
Pedestrian:	50.66	80%
Safety assist:	15.54	86%

ANCAP test results Chery Tiggo 7 (2025, aligned with Euro NCAP)
Test	Points	%
Overall:	5 /5 stars	
Adult occupant:	32.99	82%
Child occupant:	42.23	86%
Pedestrian:	50.60	80%
Safety assist:	14.79	82%

==== ASEAN NCAP ====
ASEAN NCAP test results Chery Tiggo 7 PHEV (2025)
Test	Points
Overall:	5 /5 stars
Adult occupant:	40.00
Child occupant:	17.18
Safety assist:	20.00
Motorcyclist Safety:	17.50

==== Euro NCAP ====
Euro NCAP test results Chery Tiggo 7 (LHD) (2025)
Test	Points	%
Overall:	4 /5 stars	
Adult occupant:	32.2	80%
Child occupant:	37.8	77%
Pedestrian:	50.6	80%
Safety assist:	14.2	78%

Euro NCAP test results Chery Tiggo 7 PHEV (LHD) (2025)
Test	Points	%
Overall:	5 /5 stars	
Adult occupant:	33.0	82%
Child occupant:	41.8	85%
Pedestrian:	50.6	80%
Safety assist:	14.2	78%

==== Global NCAP ====
Global NCAP 2.5 test results (South Africa) Chery Tiggo 7 Pro (2026, similar to Latin NCAP 2019)
Test	Score	Stars
Adult occupant protection	26.05/34.00	2 /5 stars
Child occupant protection	32.40/49.00	3 /5 stars

== Third generation (2026) ==
Chery unveiled the third generation Tiggo 7 alongside the Tiggo X7 at a brand night in Wuhu, Anhui on October 22, 2026. The Tiggo 7 will continue to petrol, plug-in hybrid and battery electric models.

=== Tiggo X7 ===
A rebodied version of the regular Tiggo 7. It was more squared design than the regular Tiggo 7. The headlights more sharp internal light strips, redesigned polygonal grille with body-coloured trim panel and a Chery letters in the hood. The X7 will be available in regular petrol engine and plug-in hybrid engine.

== Nameplate use with other vehicles ==
=== Tiggo 7 High Energy & Tiggo 7 C-DM (2024) ===
In China, since November 2024, a version of the Chery Tansuo 06 with a revised front fascia design was sold under the name Tiggo 7 High Energy. The High Energy version is also available with a plug-in hybrid variant, marketed as the Tiggo 7 C-DM.

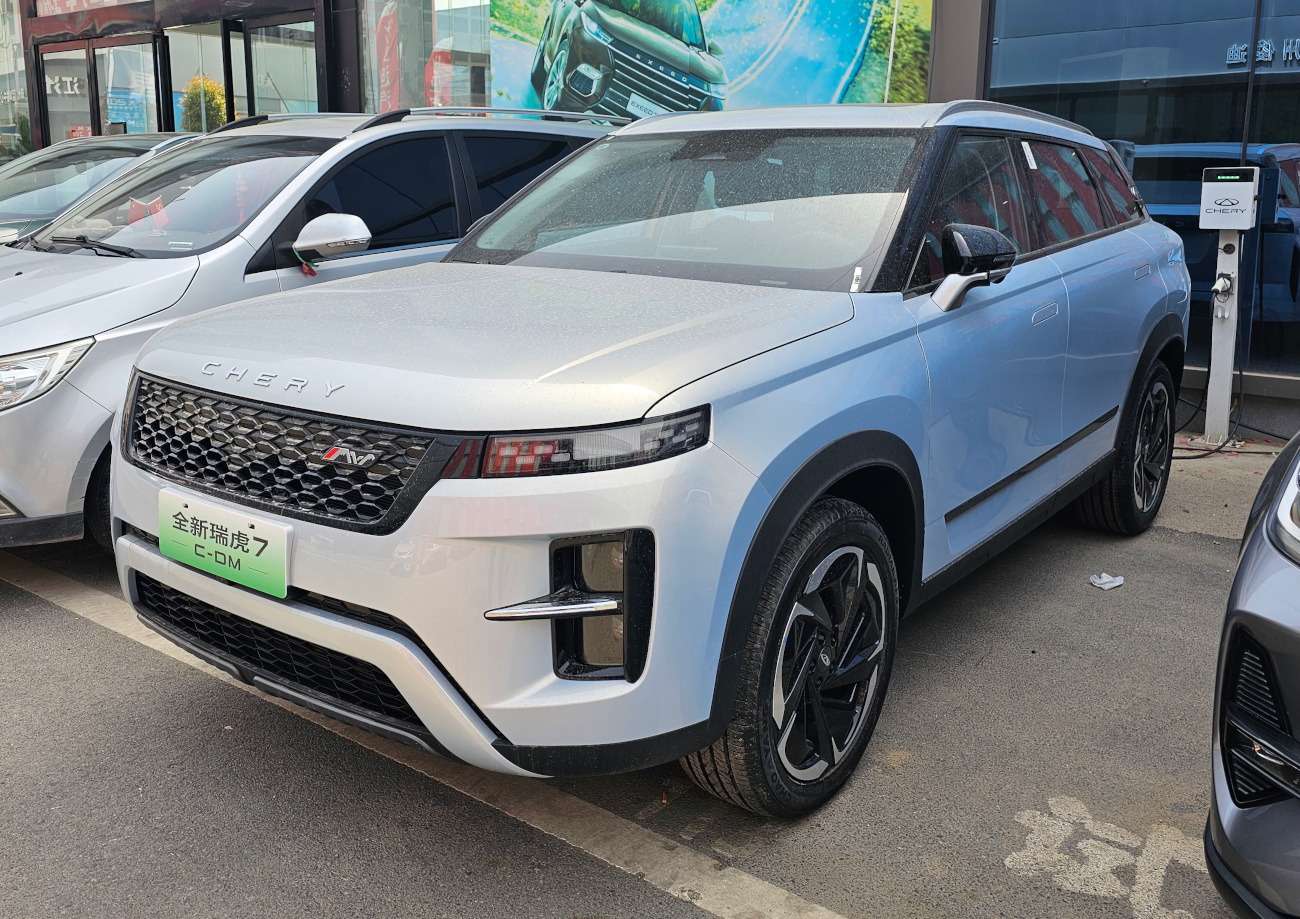
Chery Tiggo 7 High Energy

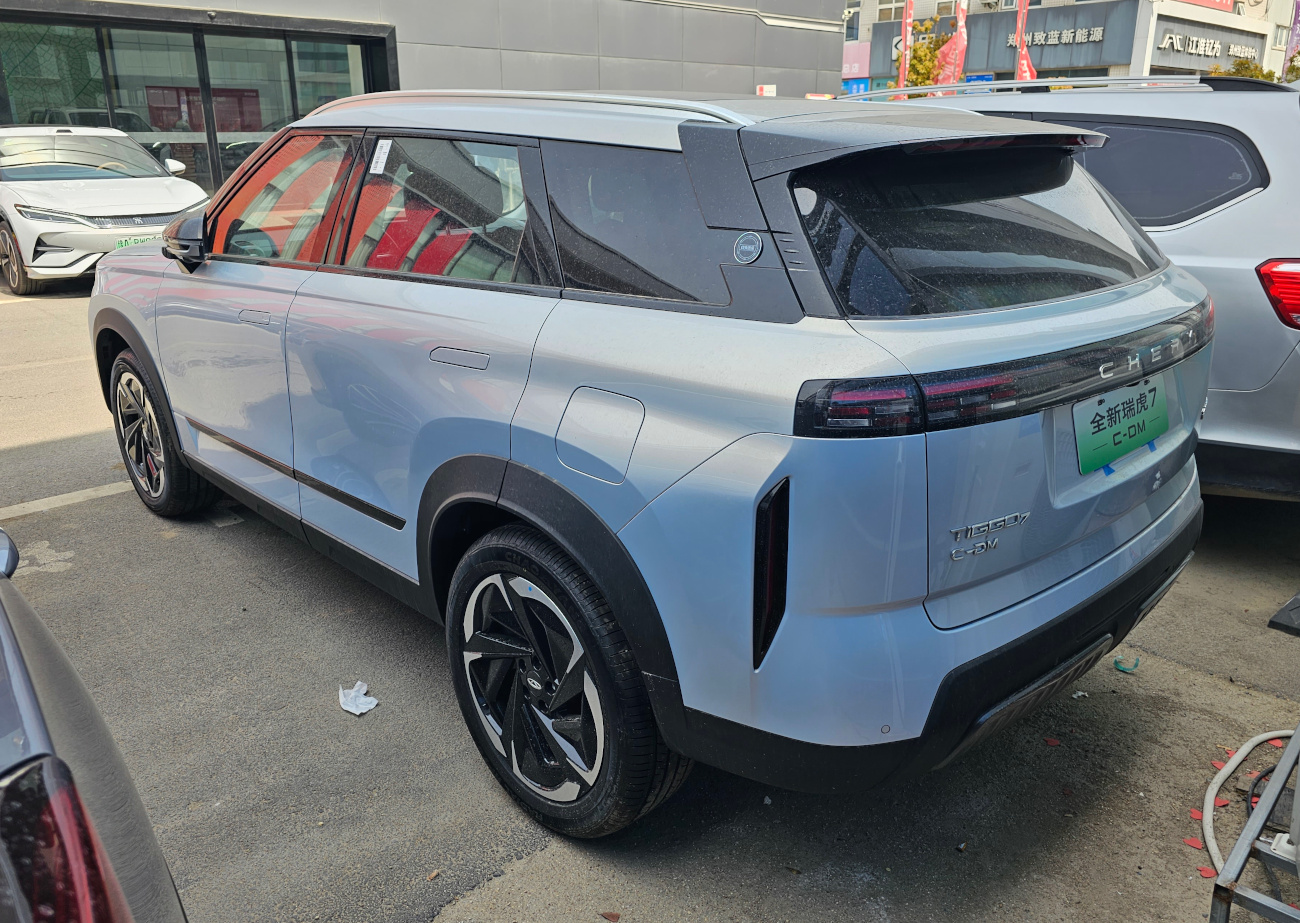
Rear view

=== Tiggo 7L (2026) ===
Based on the Omoda C7 sold in international markets, the Tiggo 7L was revealed in China on 2 March 2026.

== Sales ==
Year	China				Russia	Brazil	Mexico		Turkey	Indonesia	Total production
Year	Tiggo 7	7 C-DM	7 Plus	Total	Russia	Brazil	Tiggo 7	Pro e+	Turkey	Indonesia	Total production
2016		—	—	34,178			—	—			
2017		—	—	62,773			—	—			
2018		—	—	26,836			—	—			
2019		—	—	14,759	1,563	2,186	—	—			
2020		—	—	64,991	3,198	2,595	—	—			
2021		—		91,331	14,114	4,002	—	—			91,331
2022		—		53,659	18,931	8,879	4,883	—			153,777
2023	46,269	—	2,432	52,686	52,754	6,349	9,230	—	13,088	344	236,519
2024	36,920	670	18,966	56,556		30,892	3,884	296	15,447	146	296,327
2025	33,364	2,146	10,084	45,594		38,440	595	104		35	
