= Indonesia International Auto Show =

Annual auto show in Indonesia

Gaikindo Indonesia International Auto Show
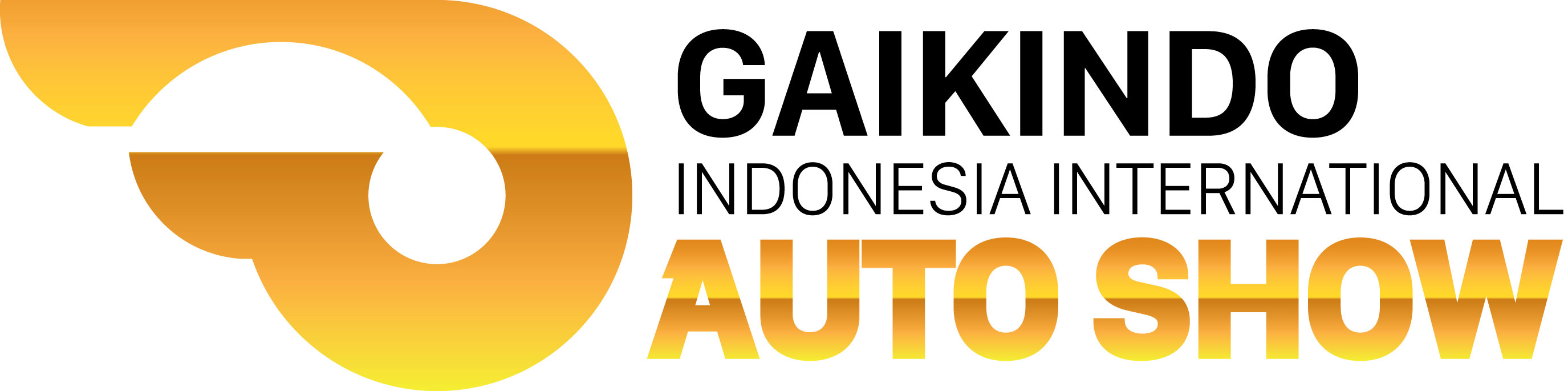

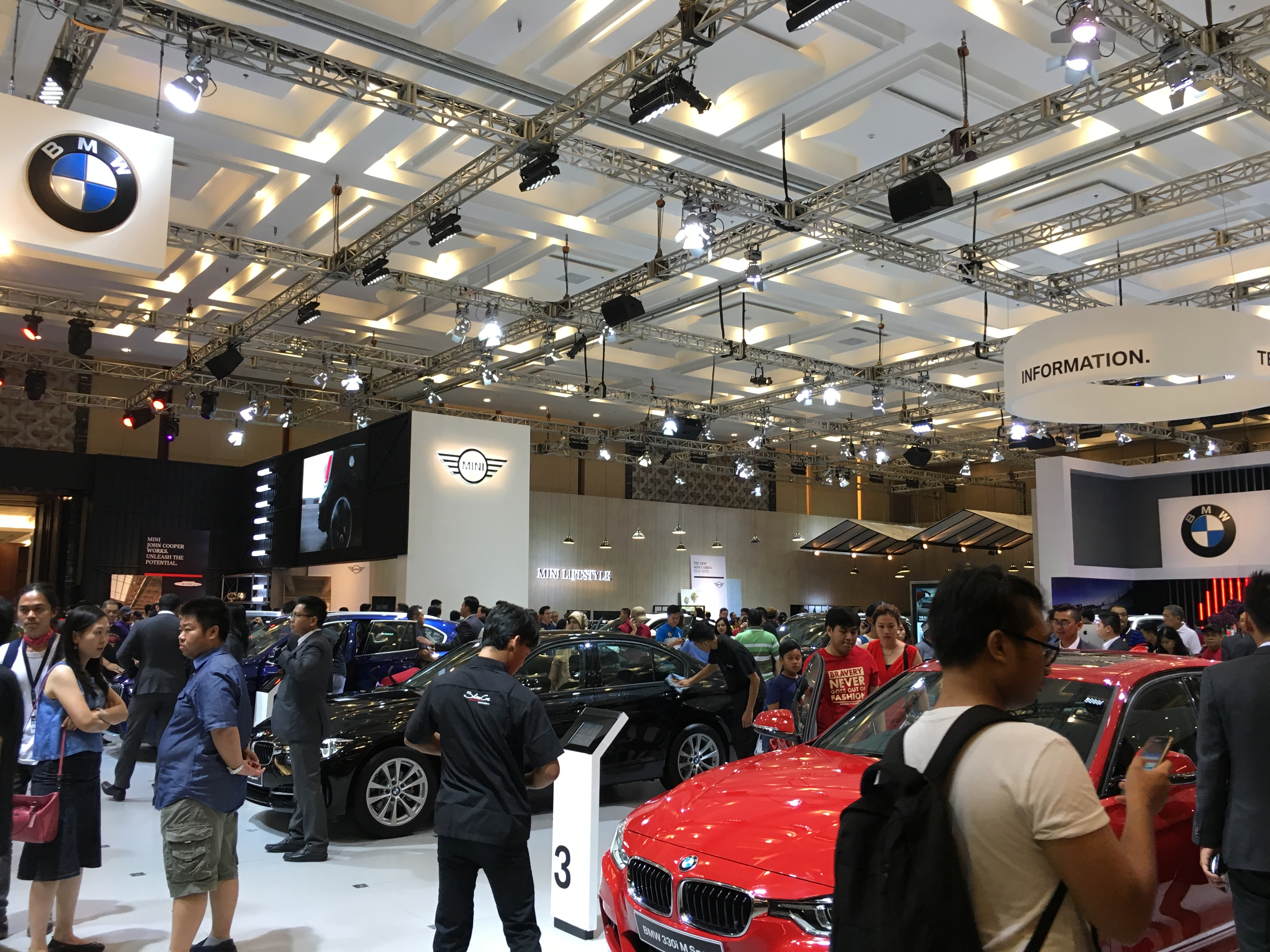
- The 2017 GIIAS onlooking the BMW and MINI exhibit
- Abbreviation: GIIAS
- Status: Active
- Genre: Auto show
- Frequency: Annually
- Venue: Indonesia Convention Exhibition
- Locations: Tangerang Regency, Banten
- Country: Indonesia
- Years active: 2015–present (spun off from the Indonesia International Motor Show)
- Previous event: 24 July–3 August 2025
- Next event: 30 July–9 August 2026
- Patrons: GAIKINDO
- Organiser: Seven Events
- Website: indonesiaautoshow.com

The Gaikindo Indonesia International Auto Show (often abbreviated to GIIAS) is an annual auto show held in Indonesia. Organized by Seven Events, and hosted by the Association of Indonesian Automotive Industries (GAIKINDO) hence its name, the show was spun off from the Indonesia International Motor Show (IIMS), another Indonesian automotive exhibition that was formerly authorized by the latter, since 2015. It is held at the Indonesia Convention Exhibition (ICE) in Tangerang Regency, Banten.

As of 2024, it was claimed as the second largest auto show in the world, behind biennial automotive shows from China, such as the Auto Shanghai and the Beijing Motor Show.

The show spawned two spin-offs; a series of roadshow events in major Indonesian capital cities since its establishment, later known as GIIAS The Series since 2019, including Bandung, Makassar, Medan, Semarang and Surabaya, as well formerly Samarinda; and a smaller-scale event since 2022, known as the Gaikindo Jakarta Auto Week.

== History ==
Prior to its establishment, the Association of Indonesian Automotive Industries (GAIKINDO) formerly established and hosted the Indonesia International Motor Show (IIMS) between 1986 and 2014, which since 2000, it was organized by Dyandra Promosindo, a subsidiary of Kompas Gramedia. The 1986 event, originally known as the Gaikindo Car Exhibition, was first held at the Jakarta Convention Center (JCC) with 13 exhibitors participated the event. The show was renamed to the Jakarta Auto Expo in 1989, then later the Gaikindo Auto Expo in 2000, before adopting to its current name, Indonesia International Motor Show in 2006 after it was recognized as an international-scale exhibition by the Organisation Internationale des Constructeurs d'Automobiles (OICA). Since 2009, IIMS relocated to its current venue, Jakarta International Expo (JIExpo), located at Kemayoran in Pademangan, North Jakarta.

Gaikindo first announced the Gaikindo Indonesia International Auto Show (GIIAS) in February 2015 after ending their partnership with Dyandra. According to Gaikindo's second co-chairman, Johnny Darmawan, the association realized the name "Indonesia International Motor Show" was already patterned and wholly owned by Dyandra, resulting the association have completely lost the rights to use the former name. After splitting off, Gaikindo trademarked the name "Gaikindo Indonesia International Auto Show" and appoints Seven Events as their new event organizer, while Dyandra retained their commitment to organize the Indonesia International Motor Show as its own event without Gaikindo's authorization, starting from 2015 onwards.

Differentiating from IIMS, GIIAS is held at a different venue, Indonesia Convention Exhibition (ICE), located at BSD City in Pagedangan, Tangerang Regency, Banten, with a total space of 220.000 m^{2} (2,368.06 sq ft). On 3 March 2015, GIIAS received a full support from the OICA, joining its membership.

In late July 2015, Gaikindo announced the show would also include a spin-off roadshow series held in major Indonesian cities, with South Sulawesi's Makassar and East Java's Surabaya being the first cities to held these events. The Makassar event would be held in November at the Celebes Convention Center (CCC), located at Tanjung Bunga in the Tamalate district, while the Surabaya event would be held in December at the Grand City Convention & Exhibition, located at Ketabang in the Genteng district.

The Gaikindo Indonesia International Auto Show (GIIAS) was officially established with the public opening of the 23rd edition on 20 August 2015, featuring a total gross area of 91.577 m^{2} (985.73 sq ft), and a participation of 40 different brands (22 in the passenger vehicle category, 10 in the commercial vehicle category, and 6 in the motorcycle category, including 2 parallel importers). Then-12th Vice President of Indonesia, Jusuf Kalla visited the event and inaugurated its opening ceremony, while being accompanied by other guests such as Ministry of Industry's Saleh Husin, Ministry of Trade's Thomas Lembong, and Banten's governor, Rano Karno. The event was also established during the country's falling domestic vehicle demand at the time. Despite its unsuccessful attempt to response falling vehicle sales, the 23rd GIIAS remain considered as a success, having visited by 451,654 visitors, beating Gaikindo's initial projected target of 380,000.

Between 2016 and 2017, the venue for the Makassar event was briefly moved to the Four Points by Sheraton Makassar hotel, located at Pa'baeng-Baeng, also in the Tamalate district. The event was returned back to its initial Celebes Convention Center (CCC) venue in 2018.

In 2017, following the success of the Makassar and Surabaya roadshow events in the previous two renditions, Gaikindo expanded its roadshow series to two more capital cities; Medan, North Sumatra, and Samarinda, East Kalimantan. The Medan event took place at the Santika Premiere Dyandra Hotel & Convention, located at Central Petisah in the Medan Petisah district, while the Samarinda event took place at the Samarinda Convention Hall, located at South Sempaja in the northern part of the city.

In 2022, the roadshow series was expanded to Semarang, Central Java, which initially took place at the Marina Convention Center, located at Tawangsari in the western part of the city. From 2024 onward, the Semarang event was moved to a newer venue, Muladi Dome-Diponegoro University Convention Center in the Tembalang district.

In 2023, Gaikindo expanded its roadshow series to include Bandung, West Java, which took place at the Sudirman Grand Ballroom, located at Dungus Cariang in the Andir district.

In 2026, Gaikindo announced the plan to expand it roadshow series to include Denpasar, Bali, which will take place at The Meru Sanur Ballroom, located at Sanur Kaja in the South Denpasar district. It will also be the first city for the 2027 GIIAS roadshow series.

== 2010s ==
=== 2015 ===
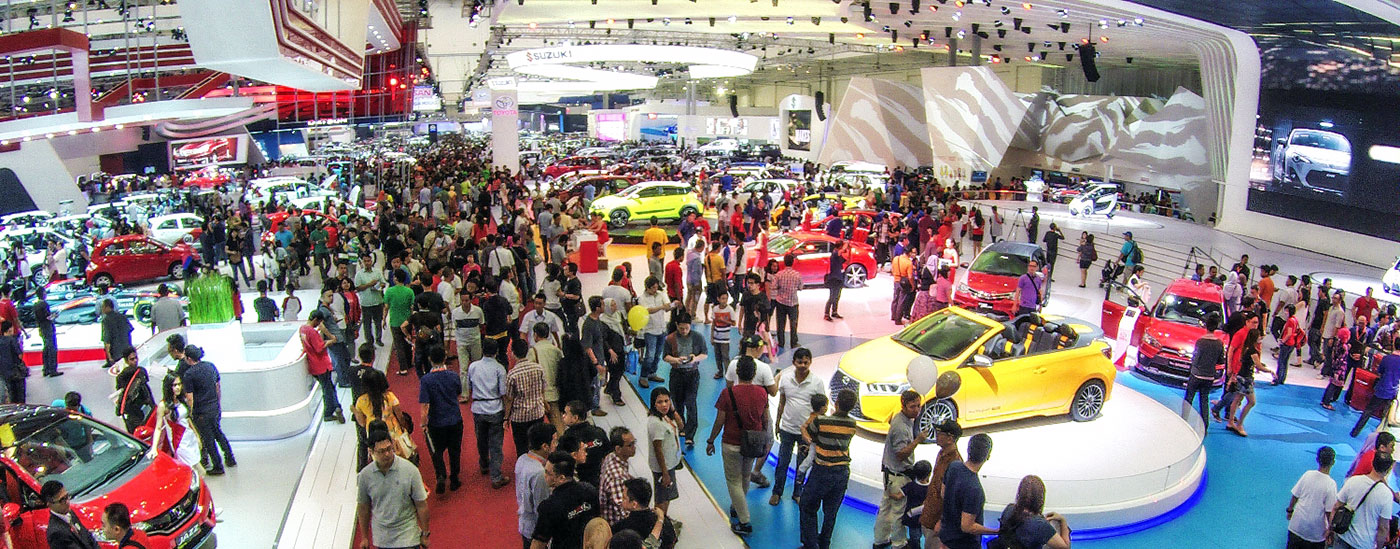
The panoramic view of the 2015 GIIAS

The first edition of the exhibition, the 23rd Gaikindo Indonesia International Auto Show was held from 20 to 30 August 2015, marking its split-off from the Indonesia International Motor Show (IIMS). Notably, its run was held alongside the 23rd IIMS at the same time. It was followed by its first two roadshow events; Makassar from 25 to 29 November, and later Surabaya from 9 to 13 December.

Audi, BMW, Chevrolet, Daihatsu, Datsun, Ford, Honda, Hyundai, Jaguar, Land Rover, Mazda, Mercedes-Benz, MINI, Mitsubishi, Nissan, Renault, Smart, Suzuki, Toyota and Volkswagen, whose all previously exhibited in previous years' IIMS, were among the first passenger vehicle brands to join the newly formed exhibition. The show also saw Indonesian automotive show debuts to Lexus and Porsche. Despite mentioned, Aston Martin and McLaren were represented by exhibits organized by parallel importers, instead of branded exhibits hosted by their companies themselves. Proton and Subaru were originally planned to participate the show, but were quietly pulled out shortly thereafter.

Commercial vehicle brands include recurring IIMS participants from FAW Jiefang, Hino, Isuzu, Mitsubishi Fuso, Tata Motors and UD Trucks, with Toyota were also present in this catergory with the Dyna, Hiace and Hilux. Iveco held its Indonesian automotive show debut at this event. Maxus, under the partnership with Malaysian distributor The Weststar Group as Weststar Maxus, also joined the exhibition to mark their entry to the Indonesian commercial vehicle market.

Motorcycles were also included in GIIAS, which previously were never included in previous years' IIMS until starting from the 2014 22nd IIMS with Ducati and Triumph. Although Triumph joined and exhibited in GIIAS, Ducati was absent for unknown reason, despite Seven Events' initial confirmation of the brand's presence in March. Alongside Triumph, Japanese brands such as Honda, Kawasaki and Yamaha, as well Germany's BMW Motorrad, also joined. Royal Enfield also joined and used the exhibition to mark their entry to the Indonesian motorcycle market.

==== Production car introductions ====
- Audi Q7 (second generation) (ASEAN debut)
- Audi TT (third generation)
- BMW 2 Series Gran Tourer (F46)
- BMW 3 Series (F30) (facelift)
- Chevrolet Trax
- Ford Everest (second generation)
- Ford Focus (third generation) (facelift)
- Ford Ranger (T6) (facelift)
- Honda BR-V prototype (world debut)
- Land Rover Discovery Sport
- Lexus ES (sixth generation) (facelift)
- Lexus RX (fourth generation)
- Maxus V80
- Mercedes-AMG GT S (C190)
- Mercedes-Benz B-Class (W246) (facelift)
- Mercedes-Benz GLC (X253)
- Mercedes-Maybach S-Class (V222)
- Nissan X-Trail Hybrid (third generation)
- Porsche 911 GT3 RS (991)
- Porsche Cayman GT4 (981)
- Renault Lodgy
- Suzuki Ciaz
- Suzuki Ertiga (first generation) (facelift)
- Toyota Alphard Hybrid (third generation)
- Toyota Hilux (eighth generation)
- Toyota Mirai
- Volkswagen Scirocco (third generation) (facelift)

==== Concept cars ====
- Daihatsu FT Concept
- Daihatsu FX Concept
- Lexus LF-LC
- Lexus LF-SA
- Mitsubishi Outlander PHEV Concept-S
- Nissan Esflow
- Suzuki iK-2
- Toyota i-Road
- Toyota Yaris Legian

=== 2016 ===
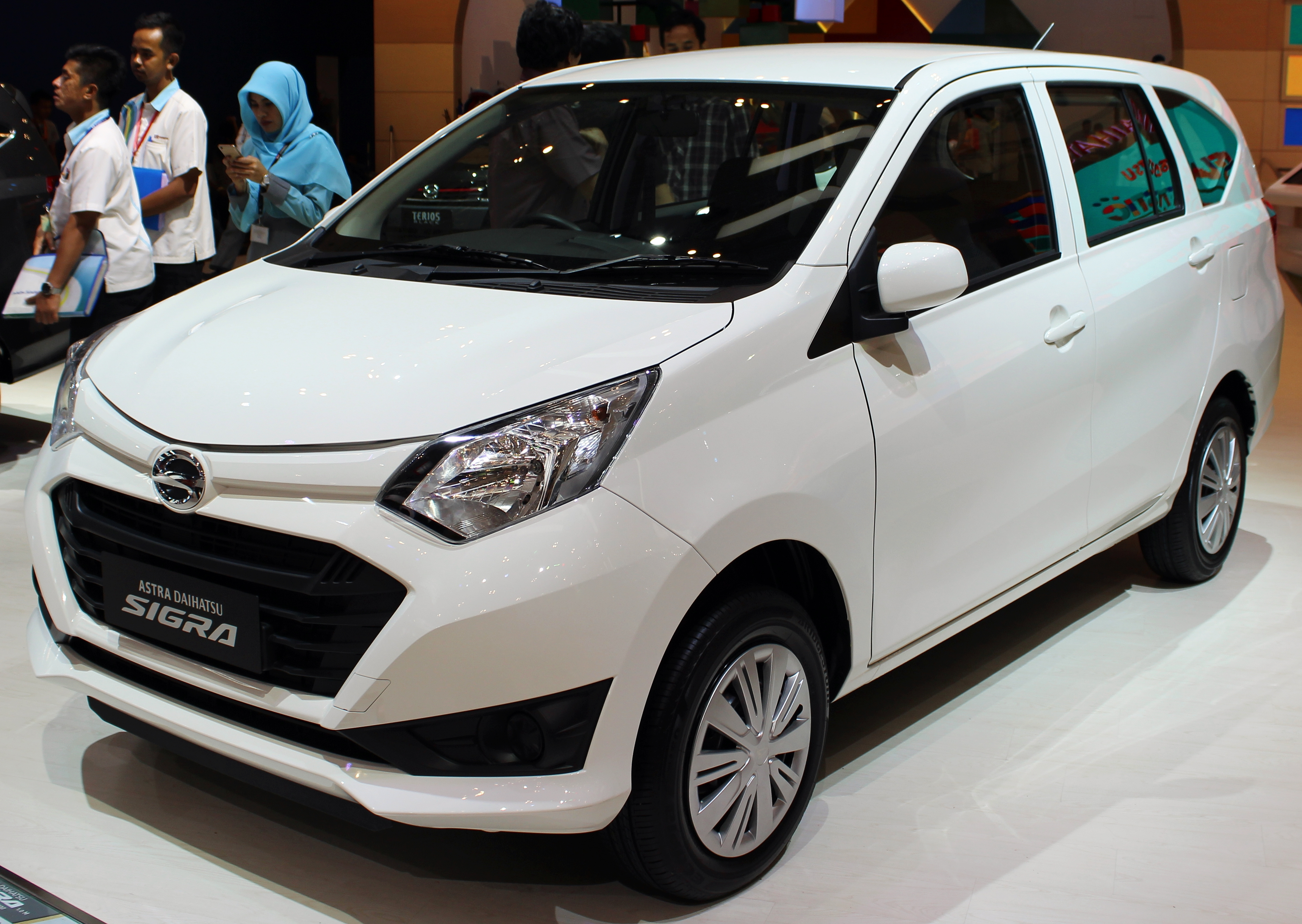
The 24th GIIAS saw world premieres to the Daihatsu Sigra and Toyota Calya.

The 24th Gaikindo Indonesia International Auto Show was held from 11 to 21 August 2016. Starting from 2016, the show was no longer held simultaneously alongside IIMS, as the latter was rescheduled to an April timeframe to avoid scheduling conflicts with the former. As of its roadshow series, the Makassar event was held prior to the main event from 18 to 21 May, while the Surabaya event was followed after the main event from 28 September to 2 October. Coincidentally, it marks the first time the main event ran alongside Indonesia's Independence Day that mostly held in 17 August.

In the passenger vehicle category, Audi, BMW, Chevrolet, Daihatsu, Datsun, Honda, Hyundai, Jaguar, Land Rover, Lexus, Mazda, Mercedes-Benz, MINI, Mitsubishi, Nissan, Suzuki, Toyota and Volkswagen were the only branded exhibitors to return. Ford declined to return, following their ceased Indonesian operations seven months before the show. However, Ford vehicles remain represented, albeit as an exhibit organized by its dealership chain, Nusantara Ford. A month before the event, Renault announced their absence for the 2016 show, citing due to "technical difficulties", which the company originally planned to introduce the second-generation Koleos and Kwid in the event. Porsche also declined to return for the 2016 show, while Smart was absent without an official statement given.

Joining the exhibition for the first time were Fiat Chrysler Automobiles (FCA) (Jeep and Dodge Journey) and Kia. Wuling Motors also joined this exhibition for their initial Indonesian introduction, previewing two models for the compact multi-purpose vehicle (MPV) segment.

As for the commercial vehicle category, FAW Jiefang, Hino, Isuzu, Mitsubishi Fuso, Tata Motors and UD Trucks were the only returning branded exhibitors, with Iveco and Maxus being absent from the event. Toyota chose not to have a dedicated booth for their commercial vehicle lineup from the 2016 show onwards, resulting the absence of the Dyna, and the integration of the Hiace and Hilux into the passenger vehicle booth. The commercial vehicle category also marked the initial Indonesian debut to DFSK.

As for the motorcycle category, BMW Motorrad, Honda, Kawasaki and Royal Enfield were the only returning branded exhibitors, with Triumph and Yamaha being absent from the event. Ducati eventually joined the exhibition for the 2016 show, following their cancelled appearance in the previous 2015 event. Additional motorcycle brands joining the exhibition for the first time were Italjet, KTM, Peugeot Motorcycles, Piaggio, Suzuki, Terra Motors and Ural Motorcycles.

==== Production car introductions ====
- Audi TTS (third generation)
- Baojun 730
- BMW M4 GTS (F82)
- Chevrolet Captiva (first generation) (second facelift)
- Chevrolet TrailBlazer (SUV) (second generation) (facelift)
- Daihatsu Sigra (world debut)
- Honda Civic Hatchback (FK) prototype (Asian debut)
- Honda Clarity Fuel Cell (2016)
- Hyundai i20 (second generation)
- Kia Grand Sedona (third generation)
- Kia Sportage (fourth generation)
- Jaguar F-Pace
- Mazda CX-3
- Mercedes-AMG C 63 (W205)
- Mercedes-AMG SLC 43
- Mercedes-Benz CLA (C117) (facelift)
- Mercedes-Benz E-Class (W213)
- MINI Cooper Cabrio (F57)
- Suzuki Ignis (second generation)
- Suzuki Jimny (third generation)
- Suzuki SX4 S-Cross (second generation)
- Suzuki Vitara Brezza
- Toyota Calya (world debut)
- Volkswagen Caravelle (T6)
- Wuling Hongguang S1

==== Concept cars ====
- Daihatsu Hinata
- Daihatsu Tempo
- Datsun Go-cross
- Lexus LF-FC
- Lexus RC F GT3 Concept
- Mitsubishi XM Concept (world debut)
- Toyota C-HR Concept
- Toyota FCV Plus

=== 2017 ===
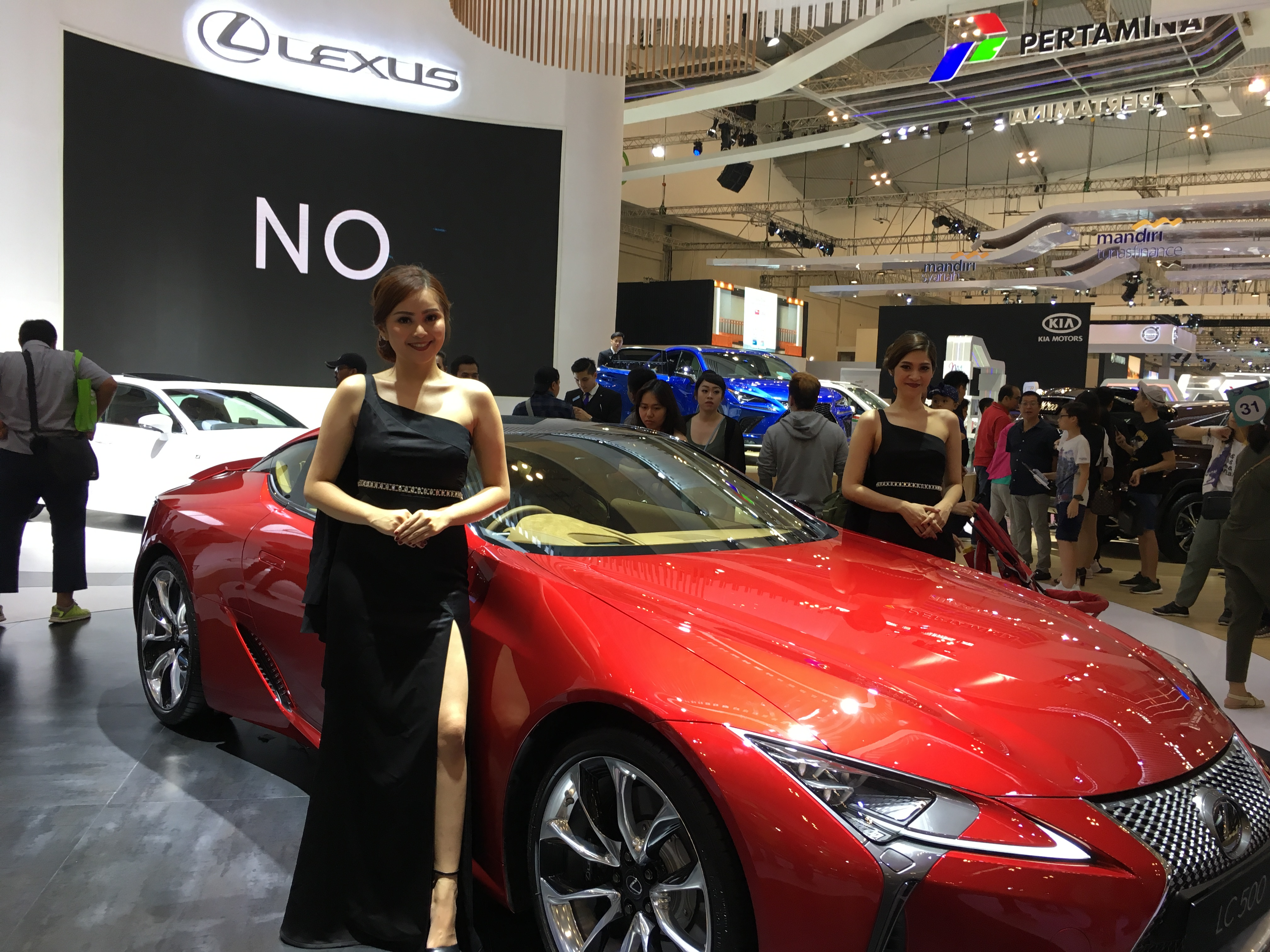
The Lexus exhibit at the 2017 GIIAS

The 25th Gaikindo Indonesia International Auto Show was held from 10 to 20 August 2017.

==== Production car introductions ====
- Audi A3 Sportback (third generation) (facelift)
- Audi Q5 (second generation)
- Honda Civic Type R (FK8)
- Mazda CX-5 (second generation)
- Mitsubishi Xpander (world debut)
- Suzuki Baleno hatchback (fourth generation)
- Toyota Voxy (third generation) (facelift)
- Volkswagen Tiguan Mk2

=== 2018 ===
The 26th Gaikindo Indonesia International Auto Show was held from 2 to 12 August 2018.

==== Production car introductions ====
- Audi A8 L (fourth generation)
- Audi RS5 Coupé (second generation)
- BMW i8 Roadster
- Daihatsu Boon
- Honda Brio (second generation) (world debut)
- Honda HR-V (second generation) (facelift)
- Hyundai Santa Fe (fourth generation)
- Lexus UX (Asian debut)
- Mazda6 (third generation) (facelift)
- Nissan Terra
- Suzuki Jimny (fourth generation)

==== Concept cars ====
- Toyota Concept-愛i Ride
- Toyota Concept-愛i
- Honda NeuV
- Mitsubishi e-Evolution
- Daihatsu DN Pro Cargo
- Lexus LS+ Concept

=== 2019 ===
The 27th Gaikindo Indonesia International Auto Show was held from 18 to 28 July 2019.

==== Production car introductions ====
- Audi Q8
- BMW 3 Series (G20)
- Honda Accord (tenth generation)
- Mazda3 (fourth generation)
- Mitsubishi Eclipse Cross
- Mitsubishi Outlander PHEV (third generation) (second facelift)
- Mitsubishi Triton (fifth generation) (facelift)
- Nissan X-Trail (third generation) (facelift)
- Toyota GR Supra (J29/DB)
- Toyota HiAce (sixth generation)
- Volkswagen Tiguan Allspace Mk2

== 2020s ==
=== 2020 ===
The 28th Gaikindo Indonesia International Auto Show was planned to be held from 7 to 17 August 2020, but it was pushed back to 22 October to 1 November 2020 due to the COVID-19 pandemic. On 18 August 2020, Seven Events announced that the 2020 exhibition would be eventually cancelled due to time constraints caused by large-scale social restrictions that halted the plans of the show.

=== 2021 ===
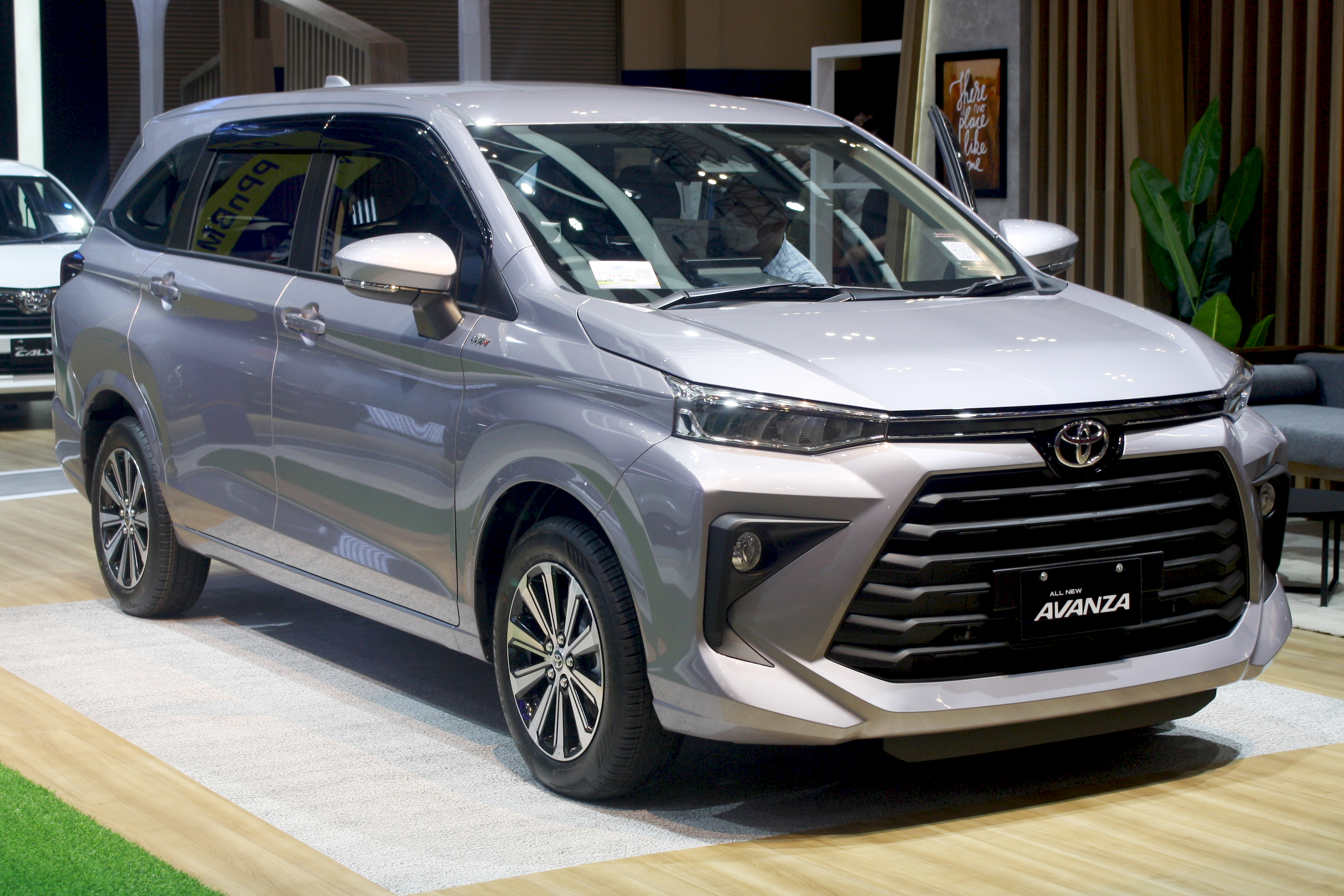
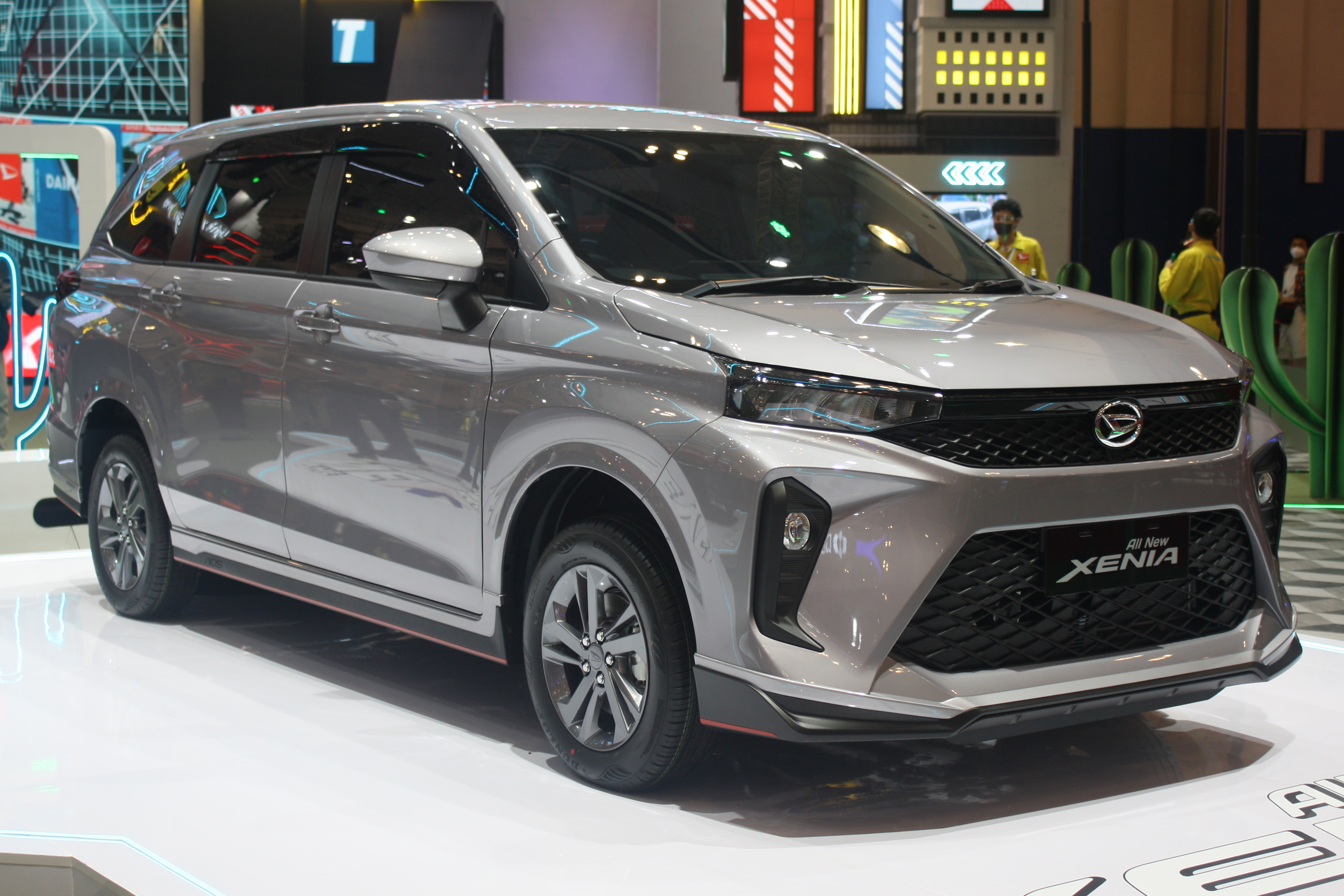
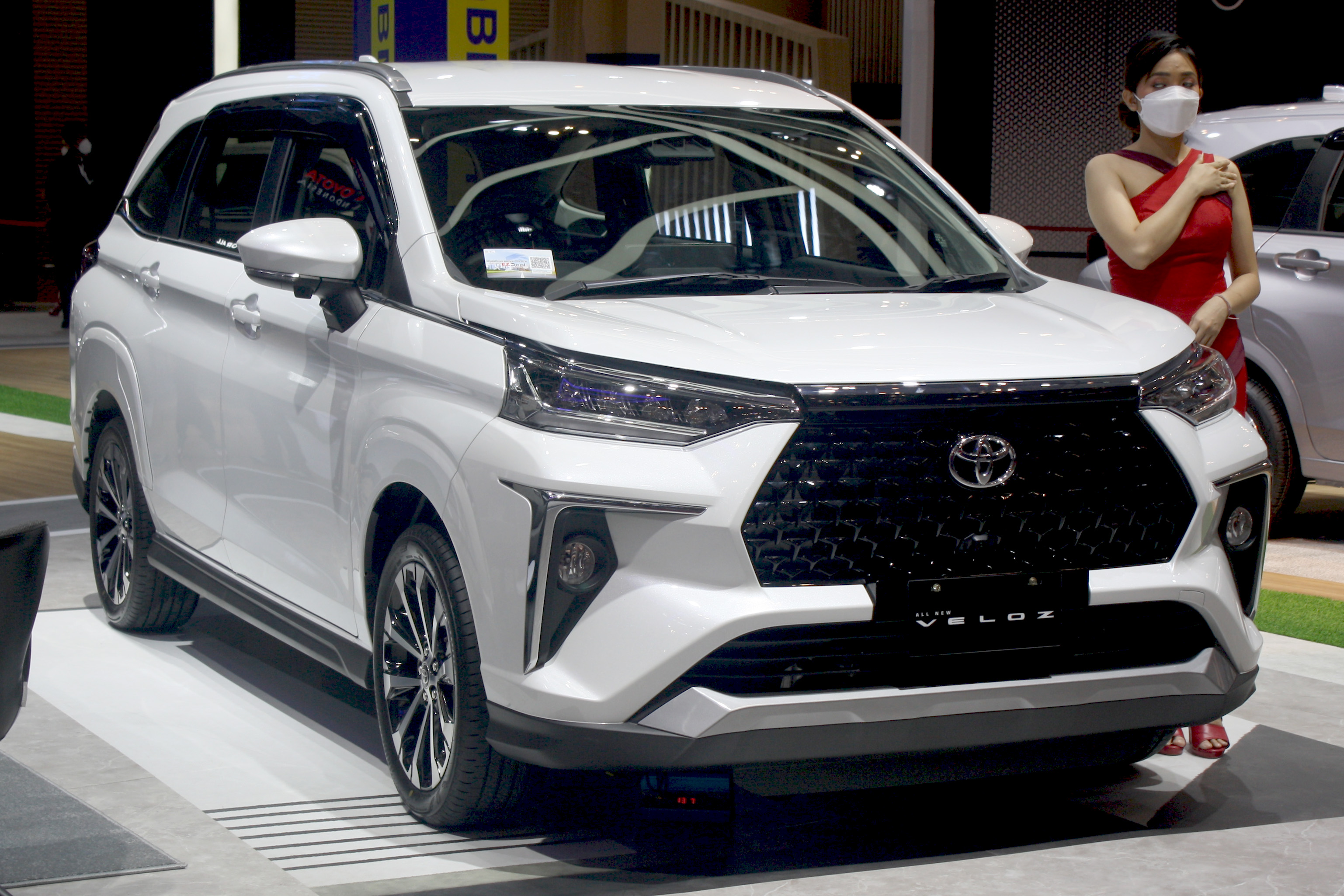
The 28th GIIAS saw world premieres to the third-generation Toyota Avanza and Daihatsu Xenia, as well the Toyota Veloz.

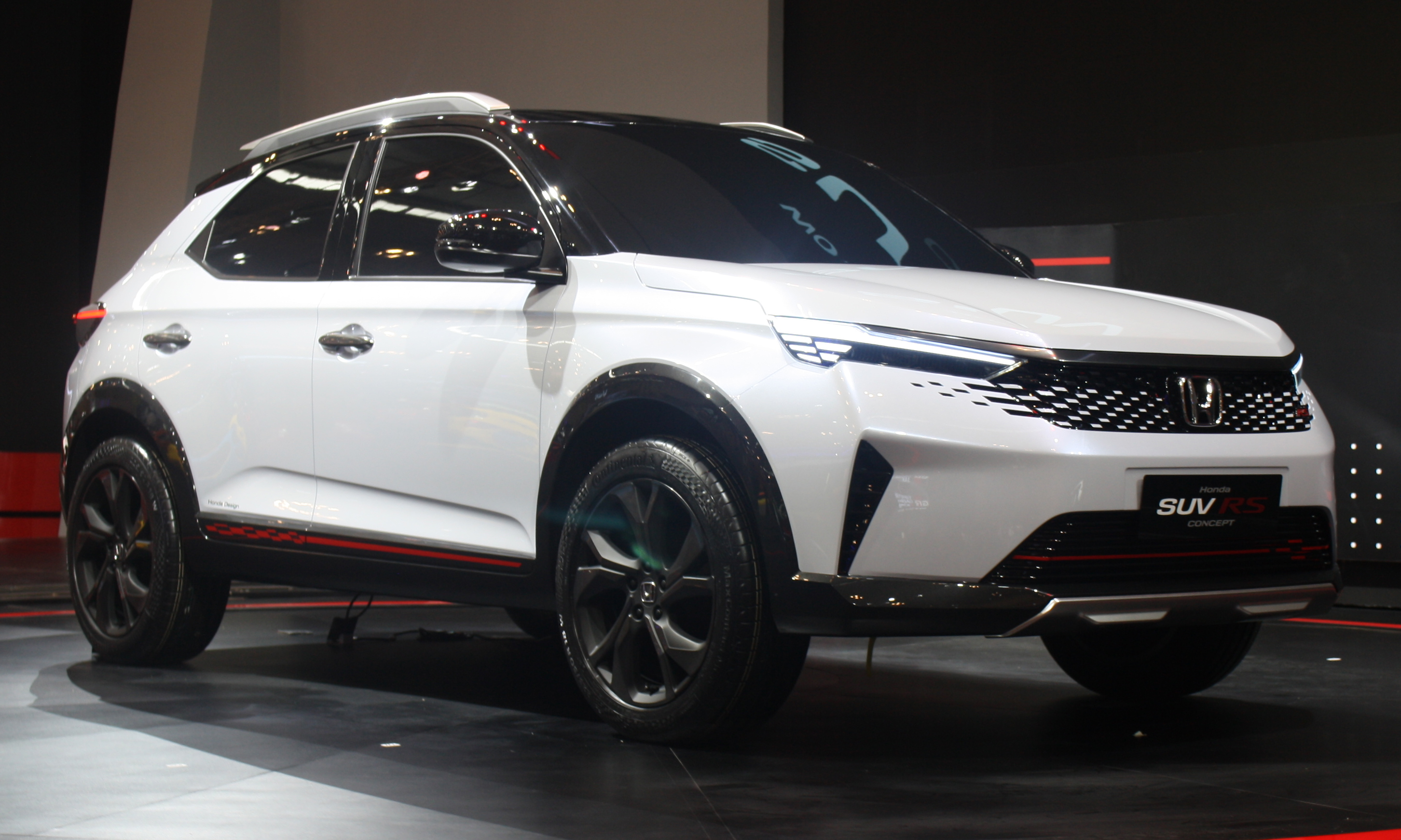
The Honda SUV RS Concept was also made its global unveiling at the 28th GIIAS.

The 28th Gaikindo Indonesia International Auto Show was planned to be held from 12 to 22 August 2021, but it was pushed back to 9 to 19 September 2021, and later, 11 to 21 November 2021 due to Indonesia's Community Activities Restrictions Enforcement during the COVID-19 pandemic.

==== Production car introductions ====
- Daihatsu Xenia (third generation) (world debut)
- Baojun KiWi EV
- Hyundai Creta (second generation)
- Isuzu D-Max (third generation)
- Isuzu MU-X (second generation)
- Lexus ES (facelift)
- Kia Grand Carnival (fourth generation)
- Mitsubishi Xpander (facelift)
- MG 5 GT
- MG 5 EV
- Nissan GT-R (facelift)
- Toyota Avanza (third generation) (world debut)
- Toyota Veloz (world debut)
- Wuling Hongguang Mini EV

==== Concept cars ====
- Honda SUV RS
- Hyundai Prophecy
- Lexus LF-30

=== 2022 ===
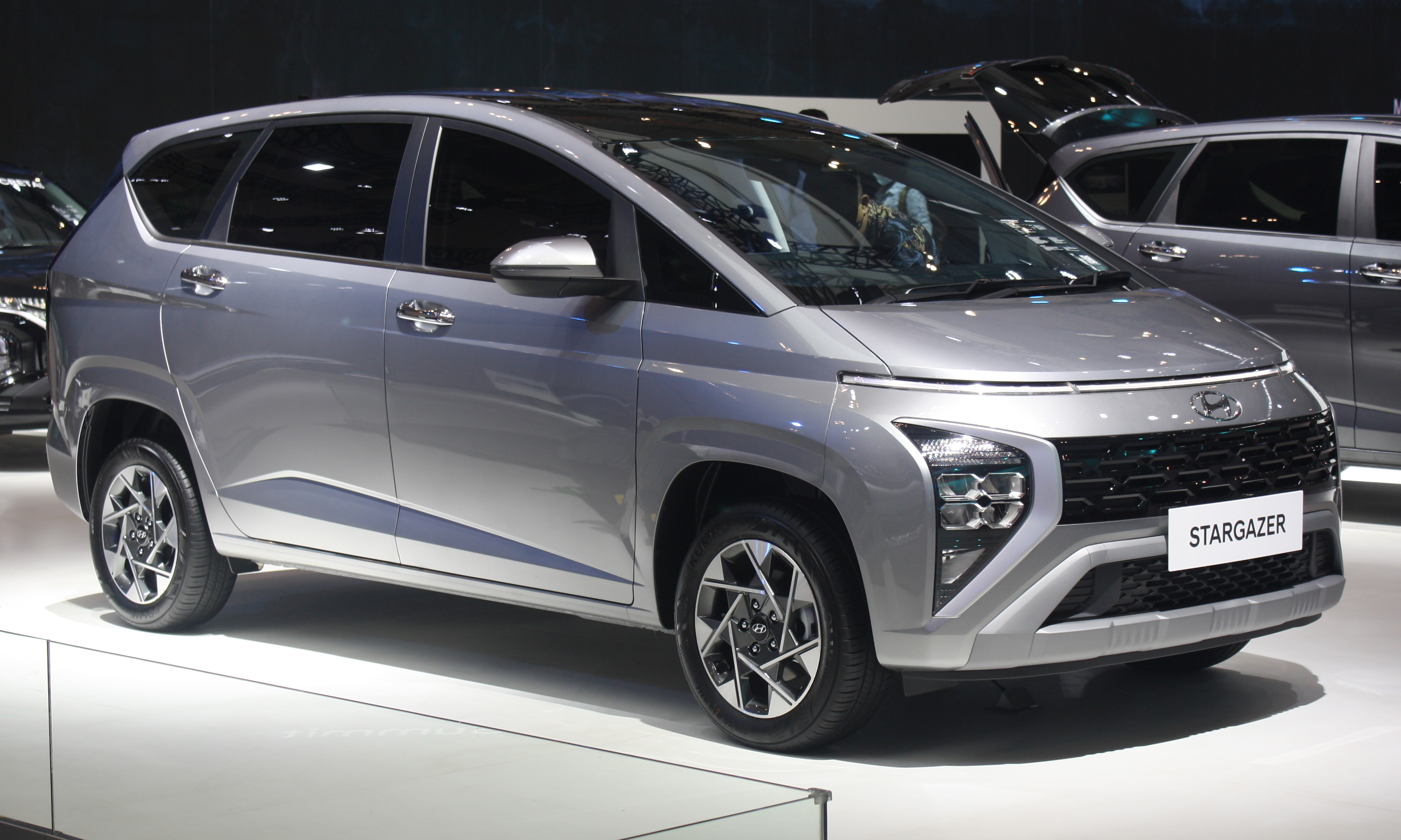
Hyundai Stargazer

The 29th Gaikindo Indonesia International Auto Show was held from 11 to 21 August 2022.

The 2022 show was participated by different 39 exhibited brands (21 in the passenger vehicle category, 4 in the commercial vehicle category, and 14 in the motorcycle category).

Returning automakers exhibiting include: Audi, BMW, Chery, Daihatsu, DFSK, Honda, Hyundai, Isuzu, KIA, Lexus, Mazda, MG Motor, MINI, Mitsubishi Motors, Nissan, Porsche, Subaru, Suzuki, Toyota, Volkswagen, Wuling Motors, Hino, Isuzu, Fuso and UD Trucks.

Subaru's participation in GIIAS 2022 also marks the brand's return to Indonesian automotive exhibitions since 2013.

==== Production car introductions ====
- Audi Q7 (second generation) (facelift)
- BMW 2 Series (G42)
- BMW i4 (G26)
- BMW iX (I20)
- Hyundai Stargazer (world debut)
- Kia EV6
- Kia Niro (second generation)
- Kia Sorento (fourth generation)
- Lexus RX (fifth generation) (Asian debut)
- Mitsubishi Xpander Cross (facelift)
- MG Extender
- Nissan Terra (facelift)
- Subaru BRZ (ZD8)
- Subaru XV (second generation) (facelift)
- Suzuki Baleno hatchback (fifth generation)
- Suzuki S-Presso
- Toyota bZ4X
- Toyota GR86 (ZN8)
- Toyota Hilux GR Sport (eighth generation)

==== Concept cars ====
- Daihatsu Ayla EV
- Lexus LF-Z Electrified

=== 2023 ===
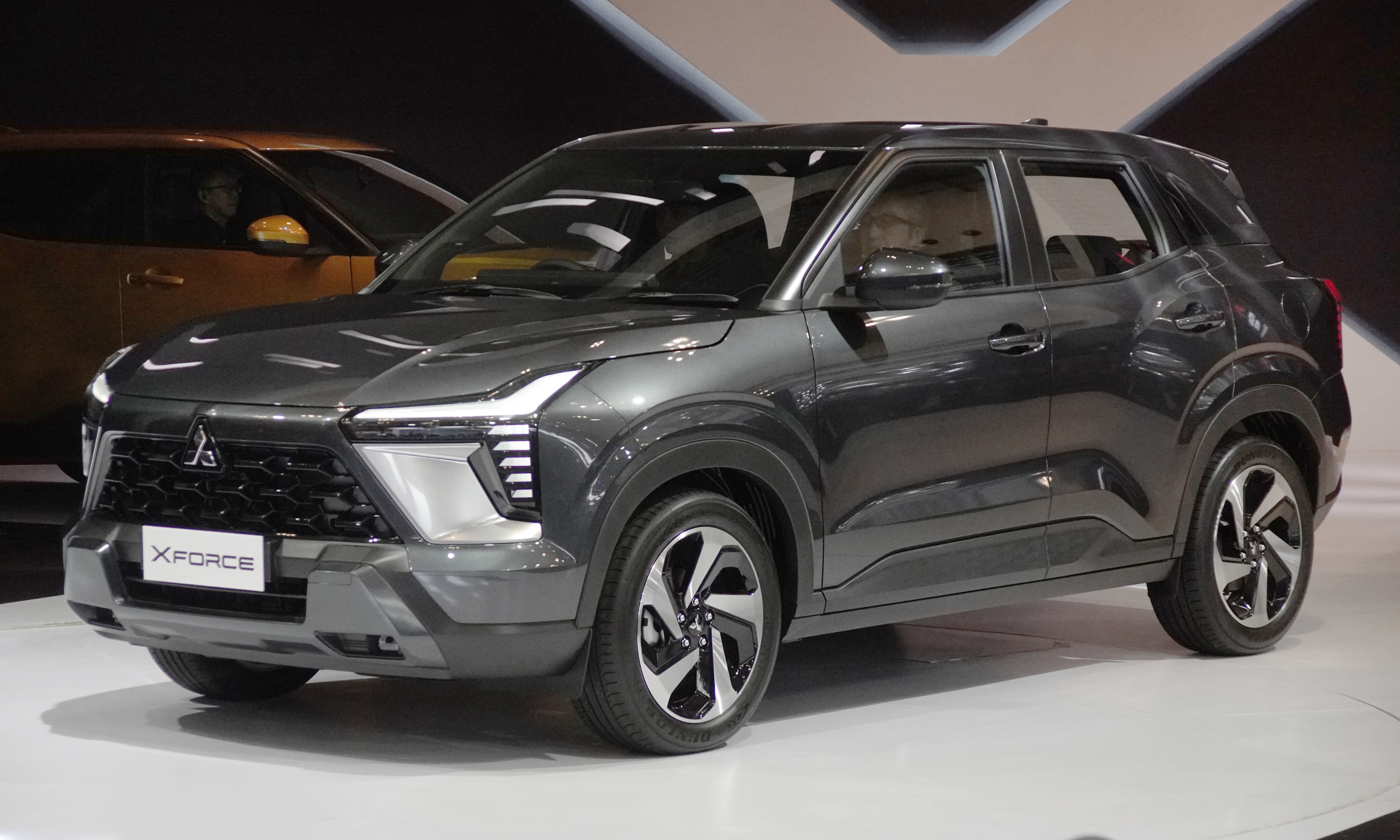
Mitsubishi Xforce

The 30th Gaikindo Indonesia International Auto Show was held from 10 to 20 August 2023. Hozon Auto (Neta) and Great Wall Motor (Haval, Ora, Tank) also joined this exhibition to mark their entries to the Indonesian automotive market.

Volvo's participation in GIIAS 2023 also marks the brand's return to Indonesian automotive exhibitions since 2017.

==== Production car introductions ====
- Audi A8 L (fourth generation) (facelift)
- Audi Q3 Sportback (second generation)
- BMW M2 (G87)
- BMW XM (G09)
- Chery Omoda 5 EV
- Citroën C3 Aircross (CC24)
- Citroën ë-C3
- Honda CR-V (sixth generation)
- Hyundai Ioniq 6
- Hyundai Stargazer X
- Kia EV9 (ASEAN debut)
- Lexus LM (second generation)
- Maxus Mifa 9
- Mazda MX-30
- Mercedes-AMG SL 43 (R232)
- Mercedes-Benz EQS SUV (X296)
- Mitsubishi Xforce (world debut)
- Nissan Serena e-Power (sixth generation)
- Porsche Cayenne (third generation) (facelift)
- Subaru Outback (sixth generation)
- Toyota Alphard (fourth generation)
- Toyota GR Corolla
- Toyota Prius (fifth generation)
- Volkswagen Golf GTI Mk8
- Volkswagen Tiguan Allspace Mk2 (facelift)
- Volvo C40 Recharge
- Wuling Almaz RS (facelift)

==== Concept cars ====
- Daihatsu VIZION—F
- Nissan Ariya Single Seater

=== 2024 ===
The 31st Gaikindo Indonesia International Auto Show was held from 18 to 28 July 2024, with media previews held on the 17th. The main 2024 event was moved to a July timeframe as a response to the 2024 Indonesian general election.

The 2024 show saw a larger participation of 55 different exhibited brands (31 in the passenger vehicle category, 4 in the commercial vehicle category, and 20 in the motorcycle category) with over 120 supporting industries. Responding to the participation list, the main Tangerang event was expanded to over 120.000 m^{2} (1,291.67 sq ft) area space to better accommodate all brands. An additional large tent was deployed outside the exhibition's eastern entrance, serving as the eleventh hall occupying motorcycle brands and supporting industries. Gaikindo claims the 2024 show as the world's second largest automotive show after China's Beijing Motor Show. A media preview for the main event, held before the first public day, marks the first time for GIIAS to do so, departing from its previous renditions that held media previews simultaneously alongside the first public day after the opening ceremonies. This move eventually follows other legacy international automotive shows.

Several automakers returned from the previous year's show, while also joined by four automakers making their first GIIAS appearances; BAIC, BYD, GAC Aion and VinFast. The 2024 show also hosted the Indonesian debut to Chery's sub-brand, Jetour. Additionally, the 2024 show also saw the re-introduction of Smart, a marque of Mercedes-Benz whose currently under a joint-venture with Geely, after a six-year absence in the Indonesian automotive market.

==== Production car introductions ====
- BMW 4 Series (G22/G23) (facelift)
- BMW 5 Series (G60)
- BMW M4 (G82) (facelift)
- BYD M6
- GAC Aion ES
- GWM Tank 300
- Honda e:N1
- Honda Stepwgn (sixth generation)
- Hyper HT
- Hyper SSR
- Hyundai Ioniq 5 N
- iCar 03
- MG IM LS6
- Isuzu D-Max (third generation) (facelift)
- Jetour Dashing
- Jetour X70 Plus
- Kia Seltos (facelift)
- Lexus LBX
- Mercedes-AMG C 63 S (W206)
- Mercedes-AMG GLC 43 Coupé (C254)
- Mercedes-Benz E-Class (W214)
- MG3 (third generation)
- MG4 EV XPower
- MG 7 (second generation)
- MG Cyberster
- MG G50
- MG R7
- MINI Cooper (F66)
- MINI Cooper Electric (J01)
- MINI Countryman (U25)
- Mitsubishi Pajero Sport (third generation) (second facelift)
- Mitsubishi Triton (sixth generation)
- Nissan Ariya
- Nissan Sakura
- Neta L
- Neta X
- Porsche Panamera (third generation)
- Porsche Taycan (facelift)
- Seres 9
- Smart #3
- Toyota GR Yaris (facelift)
- Toyota Mirai (second generation)
- Volkswagen ID.Buzz
- Volvo EX30
- Yangwang U8

==== Concept cars ====
- Daihatsu me:Mo
- Honda SUSTAINA-C
- Hyundai N Vision 74
- Lexus Electrified Sport Concept
- Nissan Hyper Tourer
- Suzuki eVX (ASEAN debut)
- Toyota FT-3e

=== 2025 ===
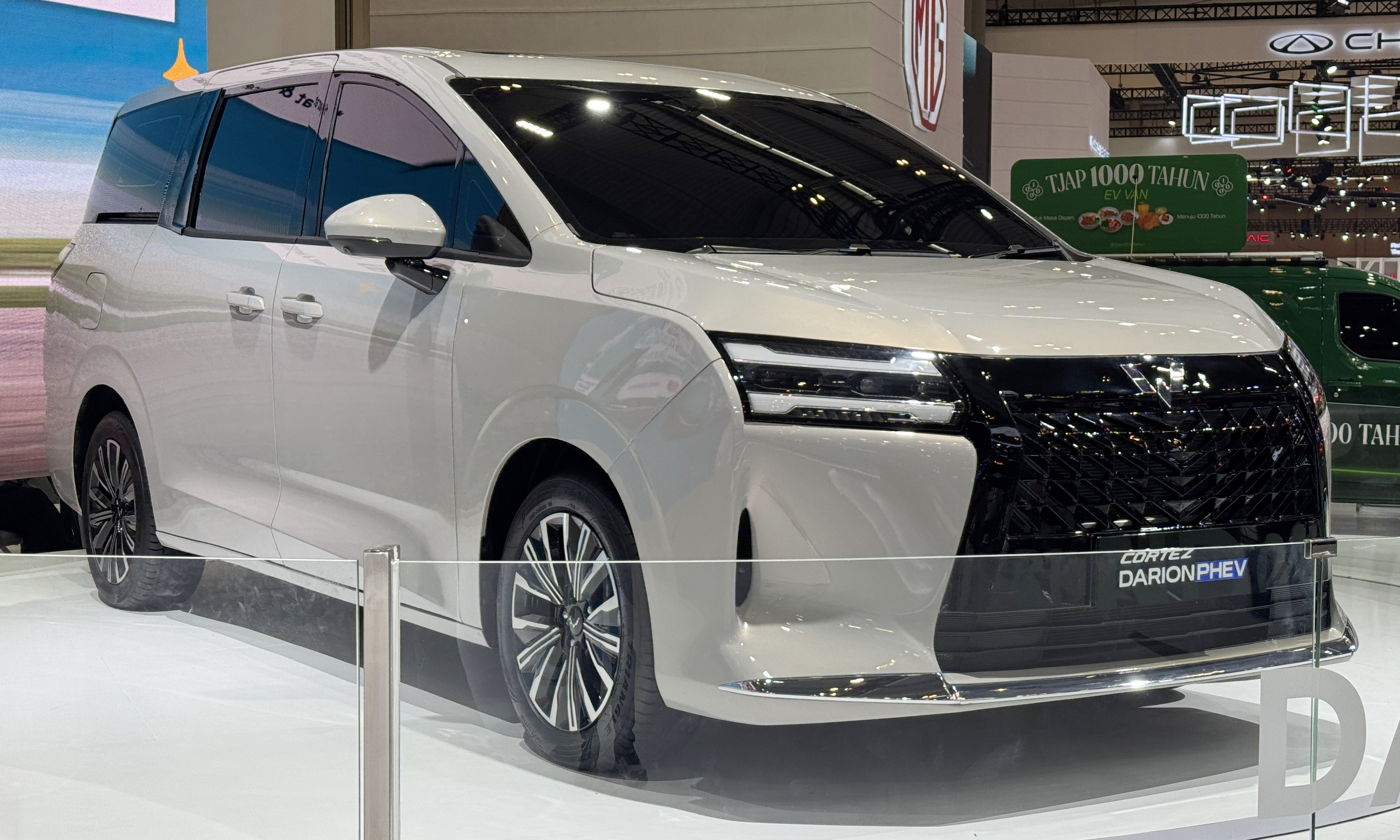
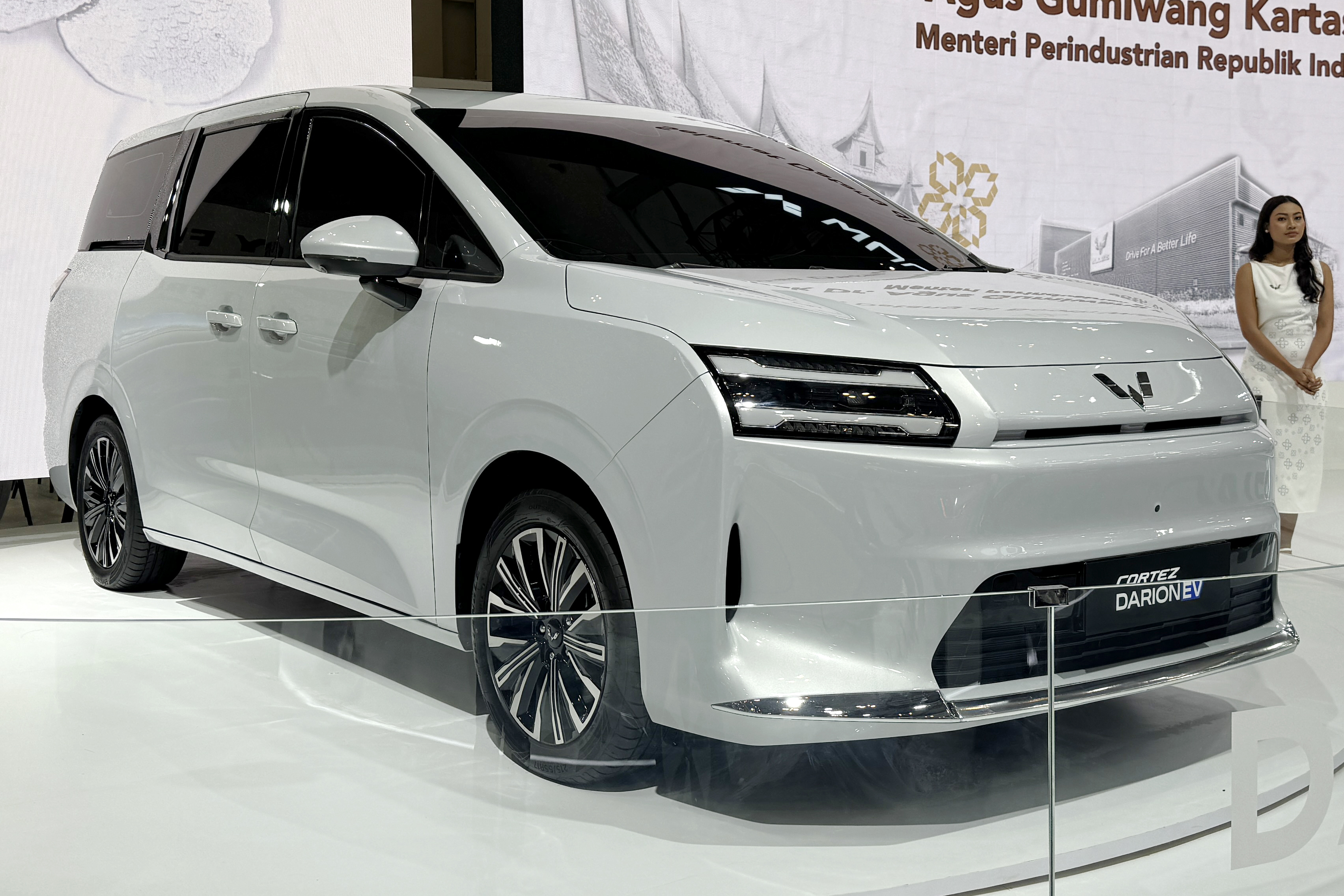
Among of vehicles debuting internationally and/or in Southeast Asia for the first time at the 32nd GIIAS include the Wuling Darion PHEV and EV.

The 32nd Gaikindo Indonesia International Auto Show was held from 24 July to 3 August 2025, with media previews was held on the 23rd.

The 2025 show was participated by 63 different exhibited brands (39 in the passenger vehicle category, 4 in the commercial vehicle category, and 16 in the motorcycle category), as well over 100 supporting industries. The tent serving as the eleventh hall was deployed again, albeit being occupied by local coachbuilders alongside the supporting industries. Gaikindo compared the 32nd edition of the show to China's Auto Shanghai.

Returning automakers exhibiting include Audi, BAIC, BMW, BYD, Chery, Citroën, Daihatsu, DFSK, Great Wall Motor (Haval, Ora, Tank), Honda, Hyundai, Jetour, Kia, Lexus, Mazda, Mercedes-Benz, MG Motor, MINI, Mitsubishi, Nissan, Seres, Subaru, Suzuki, Toyota, VinFast, Volvo, Volkswagen and Wuling, with absent brands include Hozon Auto (Neta), Porsche and Smart. Instead of returning as the sub-brand GAC Aion last year, GAC Group is represented under its own company entirely. Maxus returned for the 2025 show after being absent from the 2024 event. For the first time, Ford and Jeep re-joined GIIAS as branded exhibits since their respective hiatus in 2015 and 2019, making the show's first American automakers after a six-year absence.

Joining the exhibition for the first time were Denza, Geely, Jaecoo and Xpeng. Two Indonesian companies, Aletra and Polytron, also joined this event, marking the exhibition's first domestic automakers in the passenger vehicle category. The show also hosted the international debut to Chery's sub-brand, Lepas.

==== Production car introductions ====
- Aion UT
- BAIC BJ30 (right-hand drive debut)
- BMW iX (I20) (facelift)
- BYD Atto 1
- Chery Tiggo 9 CSH
- Denza Z9
- GAC E9 PHEV
- Geely Starray EM-i (ASEAN debut)
- Geely Xingyuan
- Haval Raptor
- Honda Prelude (sixth generation) (ASEAN debut)
- Hyundai Stargazer Cartenz (facelift)
- Isuzu MU-X (second generation) (facelift)
- Jetour T2 (right-hand drive debut)
- Jetour X20e
- Kia EV4
- Lepas L4 (international debut)
- Lepas L6 (international debut)
- Lepas L8 (international debut)
- LEVC L380 (ASEAN debut)
- Mercedes-AMG CLE 53 Cabriolet (A236)
- Mitsubishi Destinator (auto show debut)
- MGS5 EV
- MG ZS (second generation)
- Nissan Patrol (Y63)
- Subaru Forester (sixth generation) (ASEAN debut)
- Suzuki e Vitara (auto show debut)
- Toyota bZ4X (facelift)
- Toyota Urban Cruiser EV
- Wuling Darion (international debut)
- XPeng G6 Pro (facelift)
- XPeng G9
- Yangwang U9

==== Concept cars ====
- Honda Super EV
- TMI i2C (world debut)

=== 2026 ===
The 33rd Gaikindo Indonesia International Auto Show was held from 30 July to 9 August, with media previews was held on the 29 July.

The 2025 show was participated by 65 different exhibited brands (43 in the passenger vehicle category, 7 in the commercial vehicle category, and 13 in the motorcycle category), as well over 100 supporting industries.

Returning automakers exhibiting include Audi, BAIC, BMW, BYD, Chery, Citroën, Daihatsu, Denza, DFSK, Ford, GAC Motor (Aion and Hyptec), Geely, Great Wall Motor (Haval, Ora, Tank), Honda, Hyundai, Jaecoo, Jeep, Jetour, Kia, Lexus, Mazda, Maxus, Mercedes-Benz, MG Motor, MINI, Mitsubishi, Nissan, Seres, Subaru, Suzuki, Toyota, VinFast, Volvo, Volkswagen, Wuling and Xpeng, as well domestic automakers Aletra and Polytron.

Joining the exhibition for the first time were Changan, iCar, Farizon Auto, Omoda and Zeekr – the former first of which used the exhibition to introduce its Nevo sub-brand to the Indonesian market. Following its cancelled appearance at the 33rd IIMS in February, Leapmotor made its Indonesian automotive show debut at this exhibition. The show also hosted Indonesian debuts to BAW and Solarky.

=== Production car introductions ===
- Audi Q5 (third generation)
- Aletra L7 EV
- BAW D5 (international debut)
- BAW M8 (right-hand drive debut)
- BAW T01 (right-hand drive debut)
- BAW X03 (International debut)
- BMW iX3
- Changan Nevo Q05
- Chery Q (auto show debut)
- Chery Tiggo V
- Daihatsu e-Atrai
- DFSK E5 Plus (auto show debut)
- Geely Coolray (auto show debut)
- Geely Okavango (auto show debut)
- Honda Super-One
- Hyundai Ioniq 3
- Hyundai Ioniq 9 (auto show debut)
- Hyundai Staria (facelift)
- iCar V27
- Lexus ES (eighth generation)
- Mazda 6e
- Mazda CX-5 (third generation)
- Mercedes-AMG GT (C192)
- Nissan Fairlady Z (ASEAN debut)
- Omoda O4 EV (auto show debut)
- Ora 5
- Subaru Outback (seventh generation) (ASEAN debut)
- Suzuki XL7 (second facelift) (auto show debut)
- Toyota bZ4X Touring
- Toyota Land Cruiser FJ
- Toyota Land Cruiser Hybrid (J300)
- XPeng L03 (right-hand drive debut)
- Wuling Aira EV (auto show debut)

=== Concept cars ===
- Daihatsu K-Open Running
- Daihatsu K-VISION
- Daihatsu Midget X
- Hyundai Neira

== Gaikindo Indonesia International Commercial Vehicle Expo ==
A commercial vehicle version of the show, Gaikindo Indonesia International Commercial Vehicle Expo (shortened as GIICOMVEC) was announced in October 2017. The event was initially held at the Jakarta Convention Center (JCC) in Tanah Abang, Central Jakarta from 2018 until 2024. Since 2026, the event was moved to Jakarta International Expo (JIExpo), in Pademangan, North Jakarta.

== Gaikindo Jakarta Auto Week / Gaikindo Auto Week ==
A smaller spin-off of the show, Gaikindo Jakarta Auto Week (shortened as GJAW) was announced at the same time of the cancellation of the 2020 exhibition. The event was initially held at the Jakarta Convention Center (JCC) in Tanah Abang, Central Jakarta between 2022 and 2023. Since 2024, the event was moved to the same Indonesia Convention Exhibition (ICE) venue, located at BSD City in Tangerang, Banten, as the main GIIAS exhibition, due to limited space in the JCC venue in a response to the increasing participants joining the event.

In 2026, the Gaikindo announced the Auto Week series was expanded to other major cities under the Gaikindo Auto Week (GAW).

=== 2022 Gaikindo Jakarta Auto Week ===
Originally, the 1st Gaikindo Jakarta Auto Week was planned to be held from 21 to 29 November 2020 as a replacement event for the 2020 edition of GIIAS, despite to COVID-19 concerns, but was eventually moved to 9 to 17 January 2021, 6 to 14 March 2021, 5 to 13 March 2022, and later, 12 to 20 March 2022.

==== Production car introductions ====
- Kia Carens (fourth generation)
- Kia Sportage (fifth generation)
- Lexus NX (second generation)

=== 2023 Gaikindo Jakarta Auto Week ===
The 2nd Gaikindo Jakarta Auto Week was held from 10 to 19 March 2023.

==== Production car introductions ====
- Daihatsu Ayla (second generation)
- Lexus RZ
- Subaru Crosstrek (third generation)
- Toyota Agya (second generation)
- Toyota RAV4 PHEV GR Sport (fifth generation)

=== 2024 Gaikindo Jakarta Auto Week ===
The 3rd Gaikindo Jakarta Auto Week was held from 22 November to 1 December 2024, and was sponsored by Mandiri Utama Finance.

The 3rd GJAW marks the return of Ford to Indonesian automotive shows as a branded exhibit since the 2015 23rd IIMS and GIIAS. Ford's participation in the 3rd GJAW also marked the first American automaker to reparticipate an Indonesian automotive show since Chevrolet and Jeep in 2019. The 3rd GJAW also hosted the Indonesian debut of Zeekr, a sub-brand of Geely, and the global premiere of Aletra, a Chinese-Indonesian automaker, which is a part of the joint venture between Sinar Armada Globalindo (SAG) and Livan Automotive.

==== Production car introductions ====
- Aletra L8
- Aletra RL7
- Aletra RL9
- Citroën Basalt
- Ford Mustang (seventh generation)
- GAC Aion V (second generation)
- Kia EV3
- Maxus Mifa 7
- MG G90
- MINI Aceman
- MINI Cooper 5-door (F65)
- Toyota Crown Sedan (sixteenth generation)
- Zeekr 009
- Zeekr X

=== 2025 Gaikindo Jakarta Auto Week ===
Like the previous year, the GJAW 2025 took place at Indonesia Convention Exhibition (ICE) venue. The 4th GJAW was held from 21 to 30 November 2025.

==== Production car introductions ====
- Changan Lumin
- Deepal S07
- Lepas L8 (right-hand drive debut)
- VinFast Minio Green
- VinFast Limo Green

=== 2026 Gaikindo Jakarta Auto Week ===
The 5th Gaikindo Jakarta Auto Week will be held from 20 to 29 November 2026, and was sponsored by Permata Bank. Like the previous year, the GJAW 2026 took place at Indonesia Convention Exhibition (ICE) venue.

In 2026, the Gaikindo announced the Auto Week series was expanded to 9 cities in Indonesia includes: Bali, Balikpapan, Bandung, Makassar, Medan, Palembang, Semarang, Solo, and Surabaya under the Gaikindo Auto Week (GAW). All nine cities are presented in the form of mini exhibitions located in shopping centers and will be held from 25 to 29 November 2026.

About 65 automakers will be participated in GJAW 2026. The number of participants who will attend the GAW varies in each city. Balikpapan 9, Bandung, Makassar and Surabaya 10 exhibitors, Solo 11, Palembang and Denpasar 12, Medan and Semarang 15 exhibitors will be participate.

The 5th GAW marks the return of Bentley since the first participation at the other exhibitions in 2024. Bentley's debut at the 5th GAW also marks the automaker's first debut at a large-scale automotive exhibition in their country.

==== Production car introductions ====
- BMW i7 (facelift)
- BYD Atto 2 (autoshow debut)
- BYD Titan 7
- Lepas E6
- Toyota Rush (facelift)
