= Tenet (marque) =

Russian automobile manufacturer

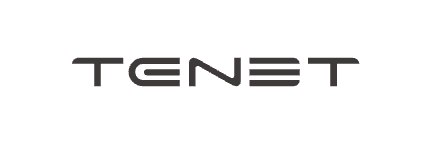
- Industry: Automotive industry
- Founded: February 2025; 1 year ago
- Founders: Wuhu Economic and Technological Development Zone Committee, China
- Headquarters: Russia
- Products: Automobiles
- Parent: Defetoo; AGR Holding
- Website: https://tenet.ru/

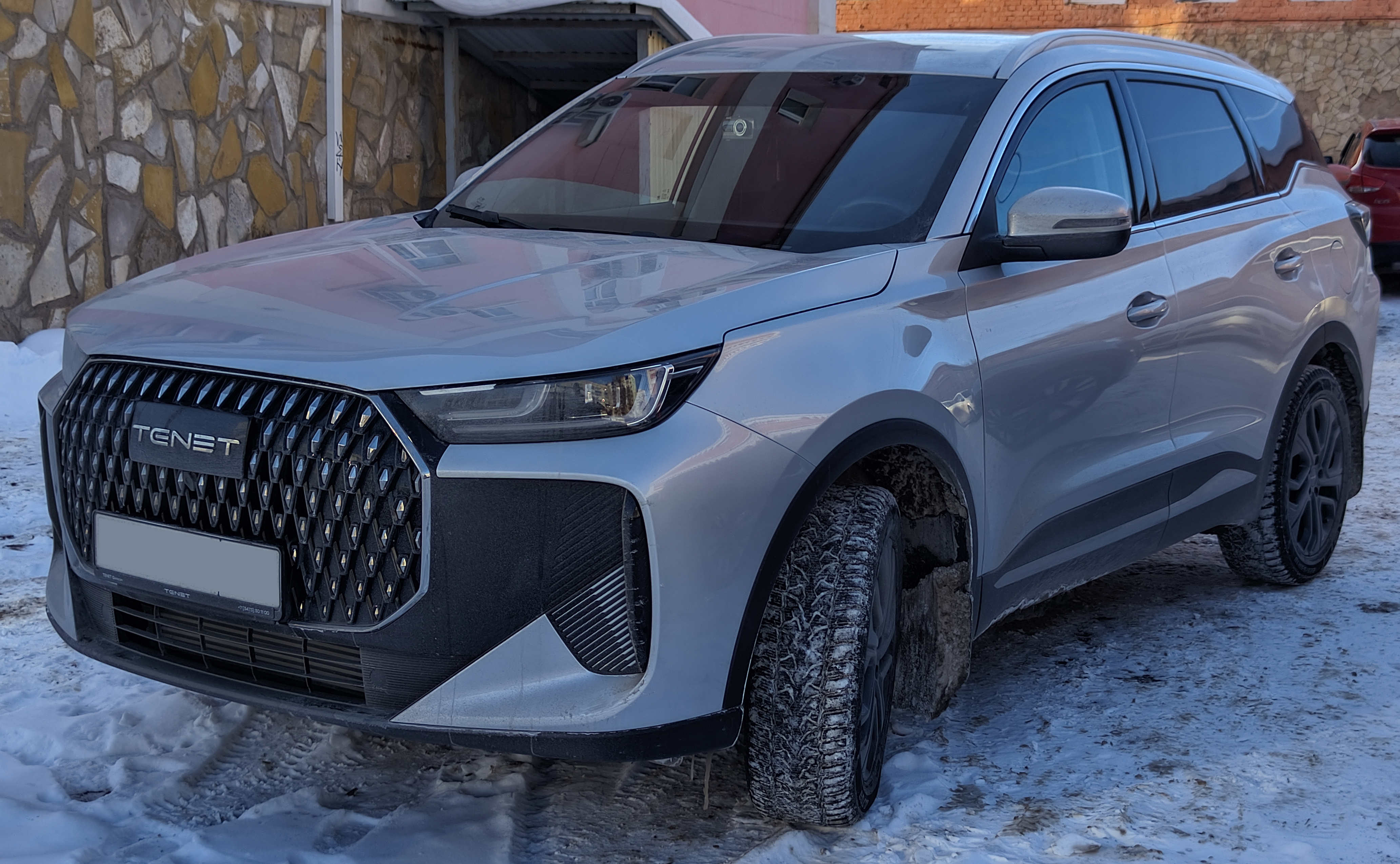
Tenet T7

Tenet is an automobile manufacturer and brand that is jointly owned by Chinese company Wuhu Defetoo Automotive Technology Co., Ltd. and Russian company AGR Holding. The brand was announced in February 2025, and only operates in Russia.

== History ==
The Tenet brand was announced in February 2025 by AGR Holding. The company owns the former Volkswagen and Hyundai plants in Russia since 2022. Assembly of Tenet vehicles are conducted at AGR's plant in Kaluga. Tenet is an acronym for the phrase Take Every New Experience Together.

The brand is jointly owned with Wuhu Defetoo Automotive Technology Co., Ltd. (Defetoo), a Chinese automotive company and technology platform registered in Anhui province. The largest shareholder is the Wuhu Economic and Technological Development Zone Committee, and the company's management includes specialists with experience in government agencies and state-owned enterprises. Defetoo claims that it is an "absolutely independent company", there are no other brands in their portfolio besides Tenet, and they are "not connected" with Wuhu-based Chery Group, despite media speculation and the fact that all Tenet models are based on Chery models. Reports suggested that the lack of transparency in the structure may be related to the inclusion of Avilon Automotive Group JSC, the parent company of AGR Holding, in the UK sanctions lists.

In February 2025, AGR Holding presented the first images of the brand's vehicles. Serial production at the former Volkswagen plant in Kaluga began in the second quarter of 2025. The holding's CEO, Alexey Kalitsev, said in an interview with Kommersant that a transition from semi-knocked-down (SKD) to completely-knocked-down (CKD) assembly is planned for mid-2025.

In the same month, a signed technological partnership between AGR Holding and Defetoo was announced. The parties agreed to organize the production of Tenet cars on a modular platform with a gradual increase in the share of Russian components. As part of the agreement, it is also planned to create a major R&D center starting in 2025.

Starting 2026, Tenet will release its "Tenet Plus" models, which are rebadged Lepas vehicles.

== Products ==
The first model of the Tenet brand was the T7 crossover, based on the Chery Tiggo 7L. Defetoo also presented plans to introduce four models, mainly in the SUV segment.

At the end of August 2025, the T4 crossover (a localized version of the Tiggo 4) was introduced. In September 2025, sales of the seven-seater Tenet T8 began. It is a localized version of the Chery Tiggo 8.

- Tenet T4 (2025–present, rebadged Chery Tiggo 4)
- Tenet T4L (2026–present, rebadged Chery Tiggo 7)
- Tenet T7 (2025–present, rebadged Chery Tiggo 7)
- Tenet T8 (2025–present, rebadged Chery Tiggo 8)
- Tenet T9 (2026–present, rebadged Chery Tiggo 9X)
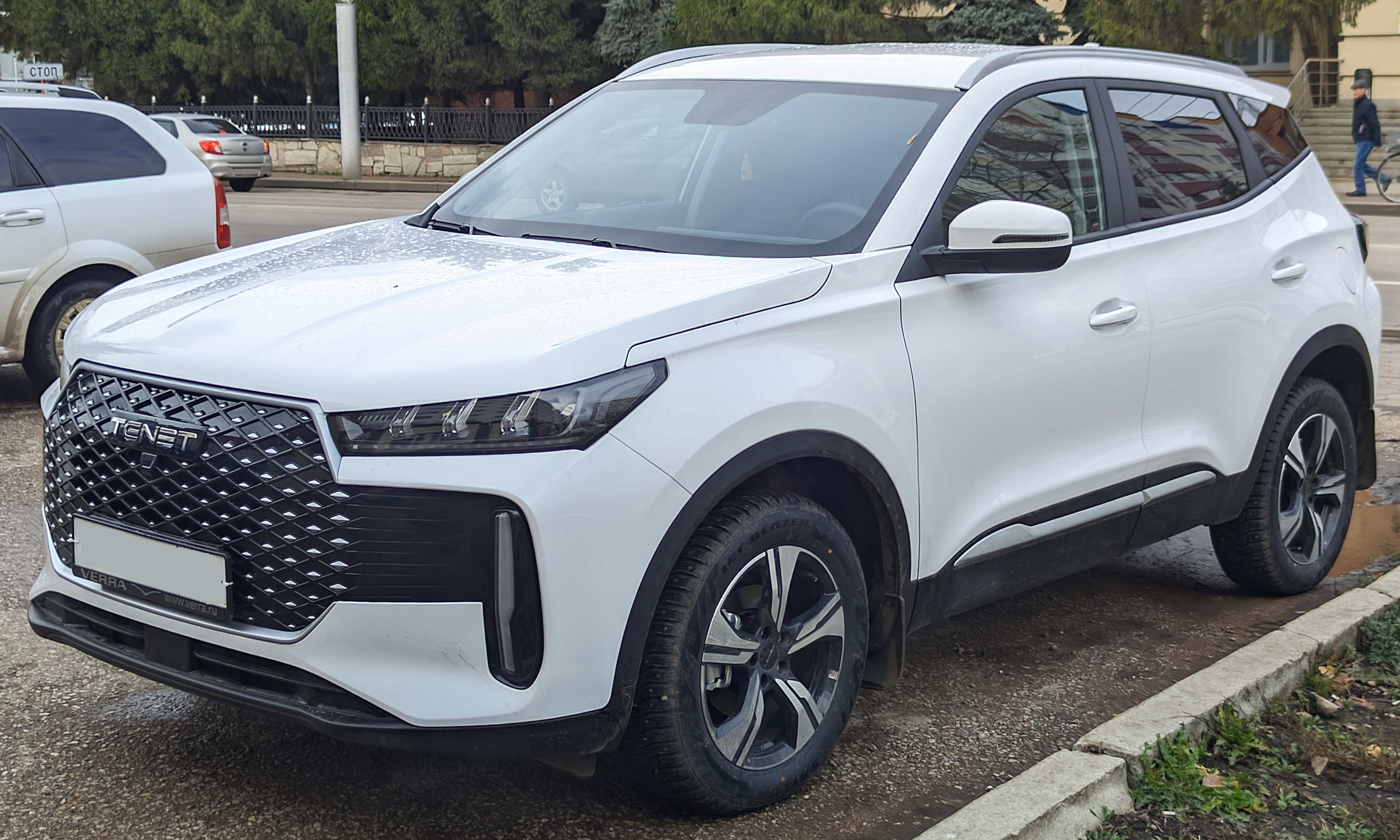
Tenet T4

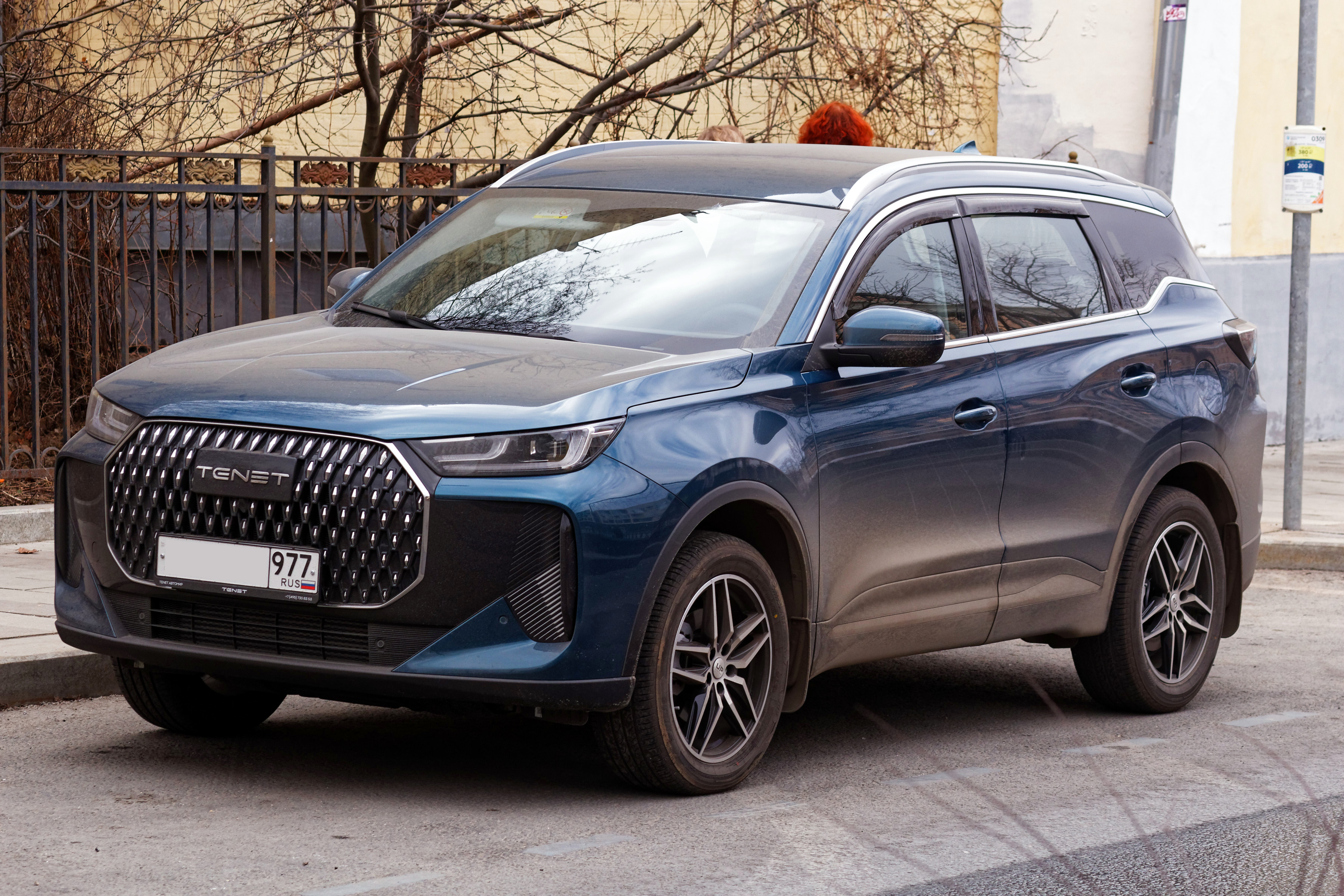
Tenet T7

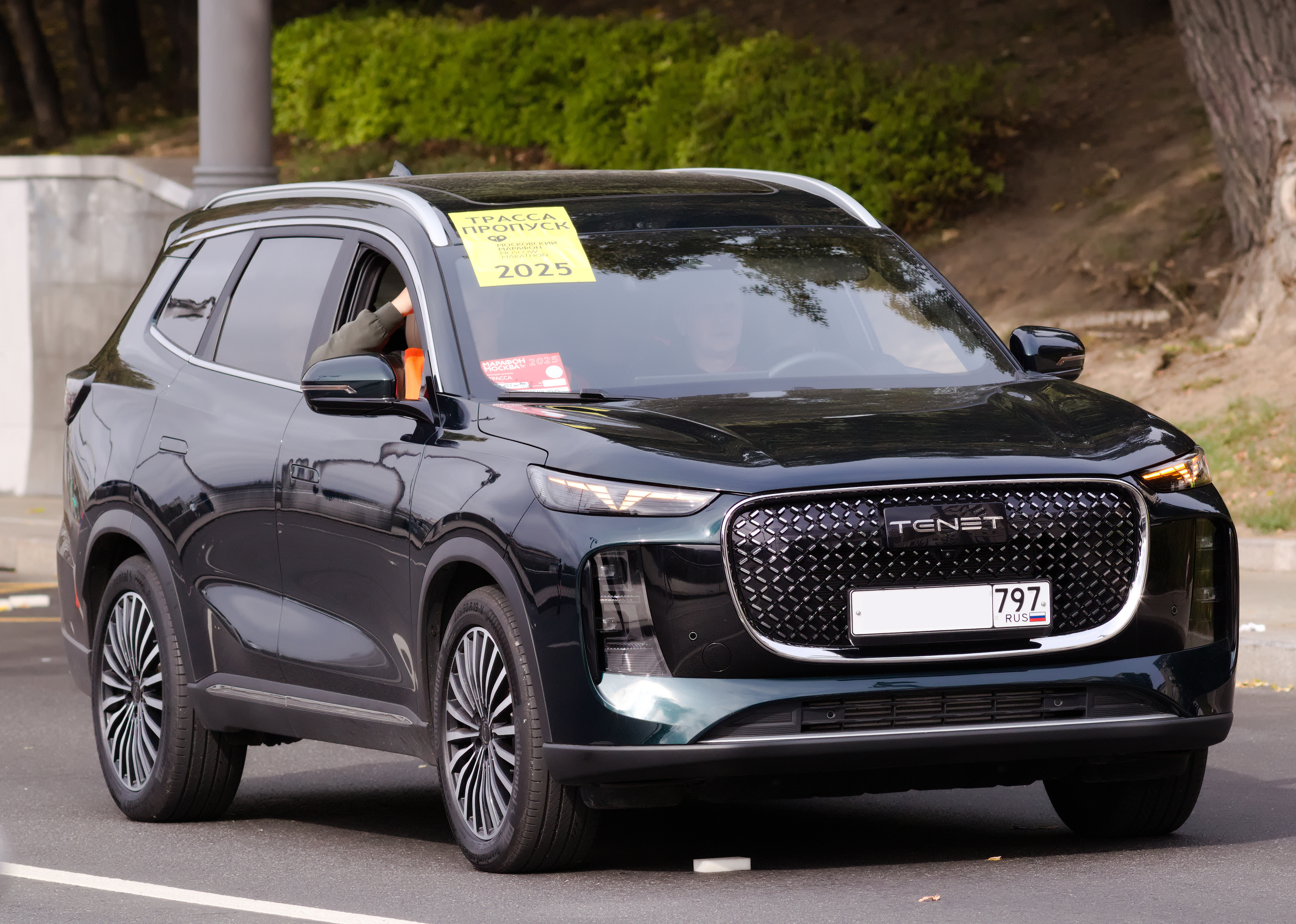
Tenet T8

== See also ==
- Chery
- Lepas (marque)
