= Lepas L4 =

Compact crossover SUV

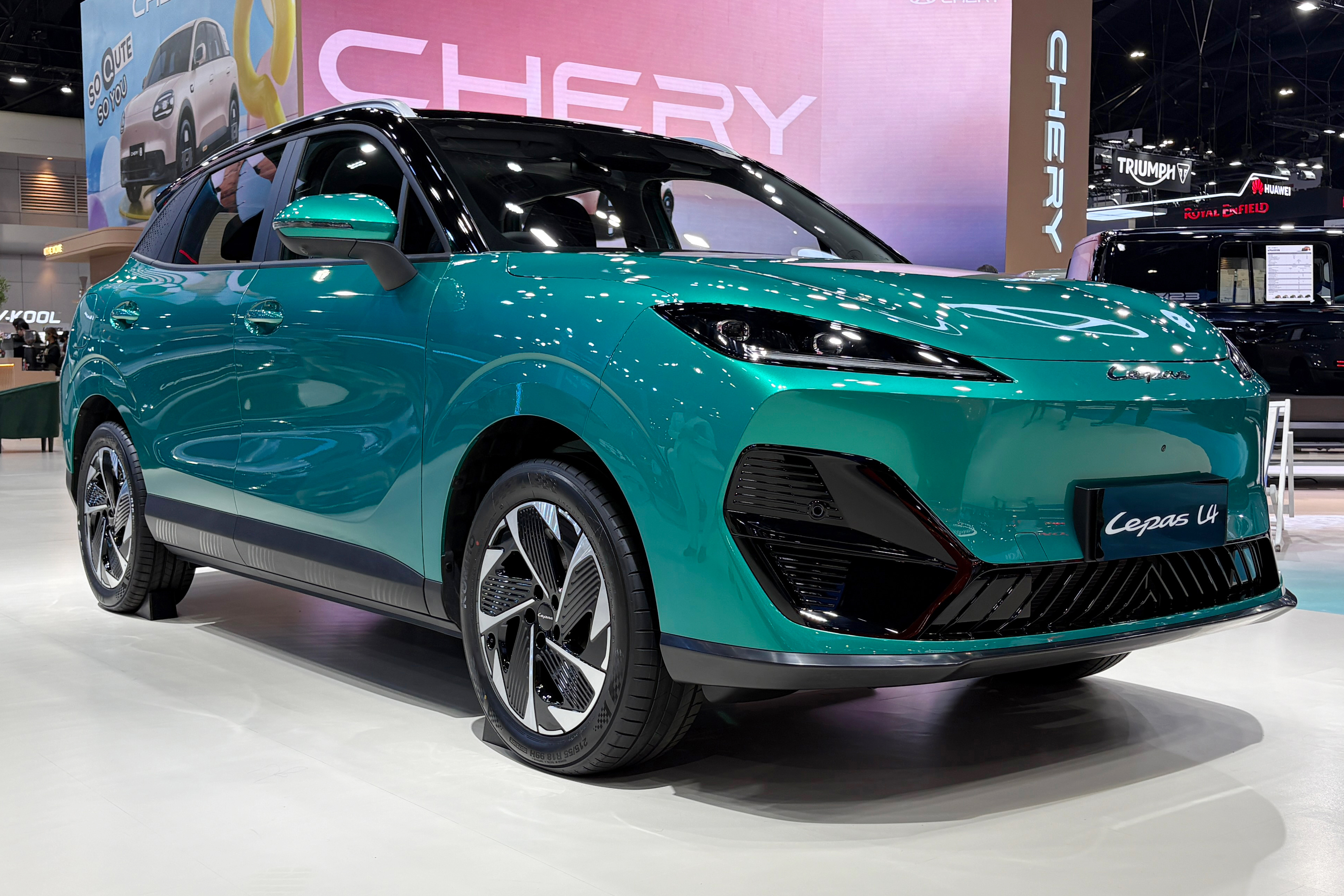
- Lepas L4 EV

Overview
- Manufacturer: Chery
- Also called: Chery Tiggo 5 (China); Tenet Plus L4 (Russia); Lepas E4 (Indonesia, electric)
- Production: 2026–present
- Assembly: China; Indonesia: Bekasi, West Java (HIM); Russia: St. Petersburg (AGR Holding)

Body and chassis
- Class: Compact SUV (C-segment)
- Body style: 5-door crossover SUV
- Layout: Front-engine, front-wheel-drive; Front-motor, front-wheel-drive (EV)
- Platform: T1X platform (petrol); LEX Intelligent New Energy Platform (electric)
- Related: Jaecoo J5; Chery Tiggo 4/5x/Cross; Omoda O4

Powertrain
- Engine: Petrol: 1.5 L I4; 1.5 L SQRE4T15C turbo I4
- Electric motor: Permanent magnet synchronous motor (EV)
- Power output: 215 PS (158 kW; 212 hp) (EV)
- Transmission: 5-speed manual; 6-speed DCT
- Battery: 65.05 kWh LFP (EV)
- Electric range: 500 km (311 mi) (NEDC, EV)

Dimensions
- Wheelbase: 2,700 mm (106.3 in)
- Length: 4,406 mm (173.5 in)
- Width: 1,817 mm (71.5 in)
- Height: 1,630 mm (64.2 in)

The Lepas L4 is a compact crossover SUV produced by Chery under its export-focused Lepas marque. It is offered with petrol and battery-electric powertrains, the latter marketed in Indonesia as the Lepas E4 and in other markets as the Lepas L4 EV. The model is built on Chery's T1X platform, sharing its mechanicals with Chery Group stablemates including the Jaecoo J5, Chery Tiggo Cross, Omoda O4 and Omoda C5. The model will be marketed in China as the Chery Tiggo 5.

== Design ==
The L4's exterior styling has been described by the manufacturer as drawing on the "agility of a leopard", following the same Leopard Aesthetics design language used across the Lepas range.

The E4 uses a different front fascia design marketed as "Leopard Gaze", with a "Predator Gaze" headlamp design and a "Leopard Leap" waistline.

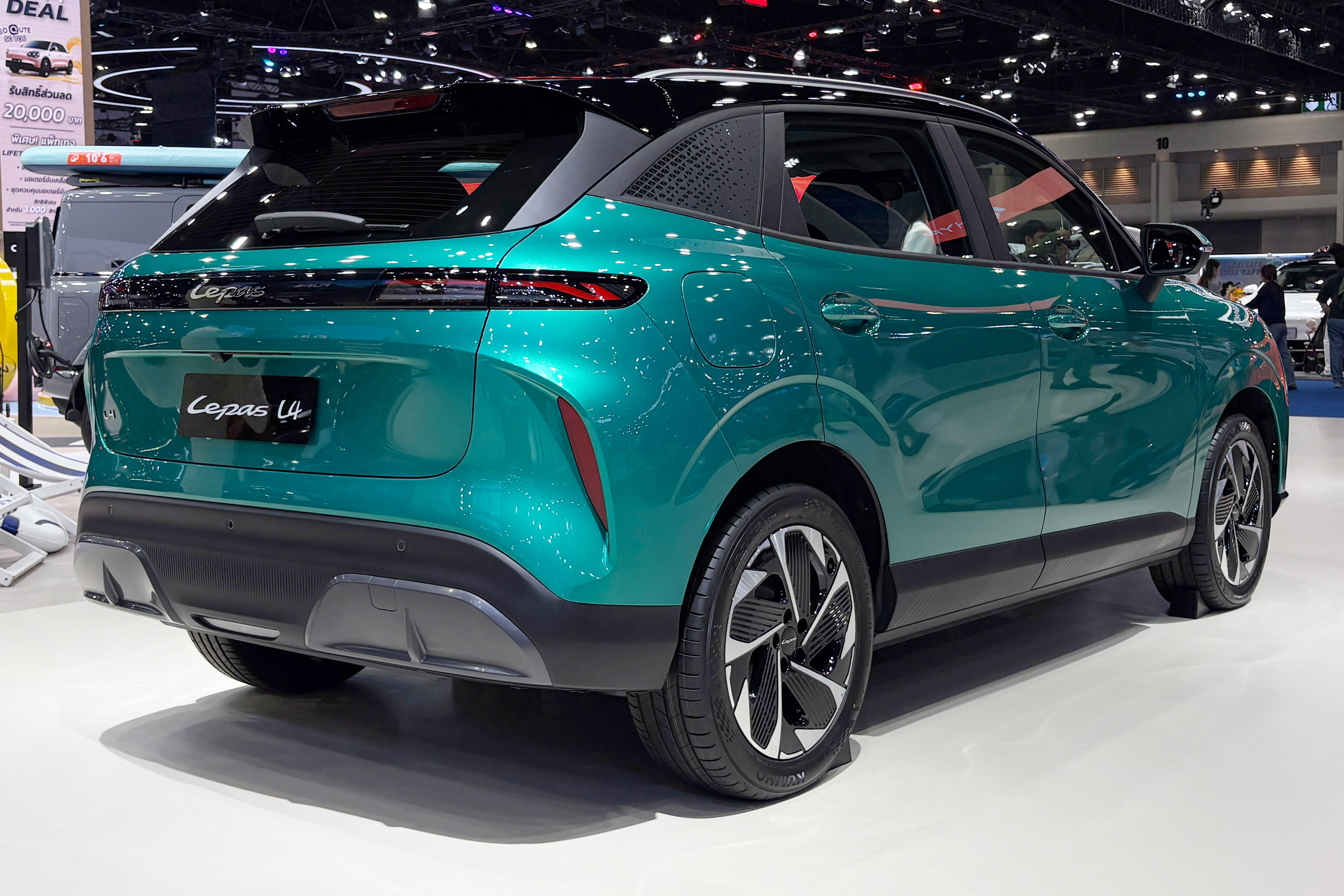
Rear view

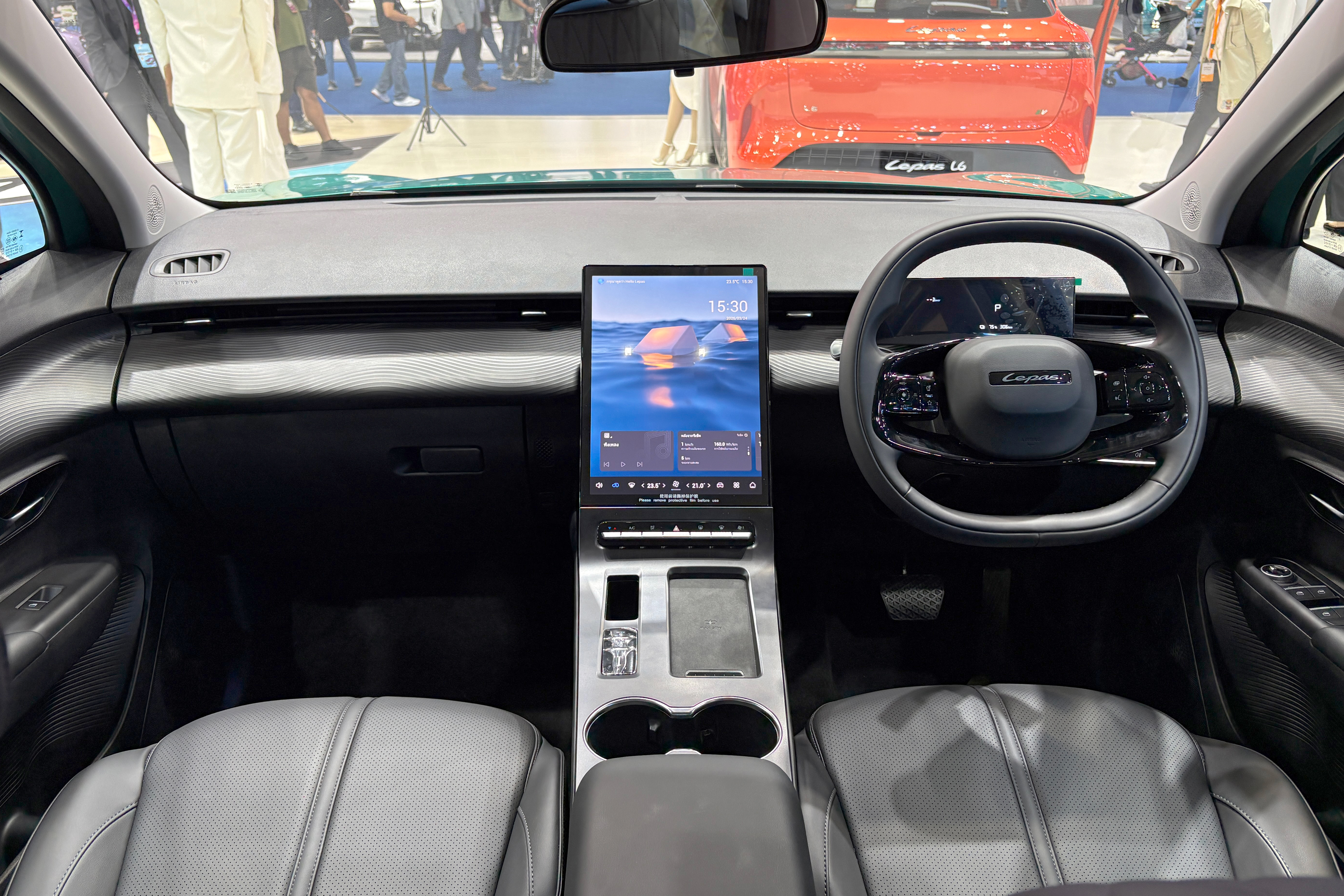
Interior

=== Interior and equipment ===
The cabin is built around a 13.2-inch portrait-oriented touchscreen infotainment display paired with an 8.0-inch digital instrument cluster, with Apple CarPlay and Android Auto both supported. A 50-watt wireless smartphone charging pad includes a dedicated cooling vent. Depending on trim, equipment includes ventilated front seats, a panoramic sunroof, a 540-degree surround-view camera system, keyless entry, and an extensive natural-language voice control system. The boot includes a false floor for concealed storage, with a spare wheel mounted beneath the boot floor on petrol variants.

== Powertrain ==
=== Petrol ===
Two petrol engines are offered. Lower trims uses a 1.5-litre four-cylinder naturally aspirated engine producing 80 kW (107 hp; 109 PS) and 138 N⋅m (102 lb⋅ft) of torque, with an option of a five-speed manual transmission. Higher grades use a turbocharged 1.5-litre four-cylinder engine producing 108 kW (145 hp; 147 PS) at 5,500 rpm and 225 N⋅m (166 lb⋅ft) of torque from 2,000 to 4,000 rpm, paired with a six-speed dual-clutch transmission. Claimed combined fuel consumption is 6.9 L/100 km for the naturally aspirated engine and 7.0 L/100 km for the turbocharged engine; the range-topping variant's claimed top speed is 225 km/h (140 mph), with CO_{2} emissions of 159 g/km.

Selectable driving modes include Normal, Eco, and Sport, controlled via a button on the centre console. The gear selector is mounted on the steering column.

=== Electric ===
The battery-electric variant is claimed to be built on the LEX Intelligent New Energy Platform, a dedicated electric derivative developed for the global market. It uses a single front-mounted electric motor producing 215 PS (158 kW; 212 hp) and 275 N⋅m (203 lb⋅ft) of torque in a front-wheel-drive layout. A 65.05 kWh LFP battery provides a claimed NEDC range of 500 km (311 mi).

== Markets ==
=== Russia ===
In Russia, the L4 is sold in localised form as the Tenet Plus L4, the second model from Tenet Plus, a joint venture between Russian holding company AGR Holding and Chinese firm Defetoo. The L4 was introduced in June 2026. Sales are scheduled to begin in the third quarter of 2026, with local production at one of AGR Holding's Russian plants, the AGS facility in Sestroretsk, Saint Petersburg.

The Tenet Plus L4 is visually near-identical to the export-market Lepas L4 aside from badging. Analysts have described the Tenet Plus brand as a deliberate multi-brand strategy by Chery to leverage the recognition already built by the related Tenet brand, rather than launching Lepas in Russia under its original name.

=== South Africa ===
South Africa was the first market to receive the Lepas brand, with the petrol-powered L4 launching on 4 March 2026 in three grades: Amur, Javan, and Pantera. The entry-level Amur grade uses a naturally aspirated 1.5-litre four-cylinder engine producing 80 kW (107 hp; 109 PS) and 138 N⋅m (102 lb⋅ft) of torque, while Javan and Pantera grades use a turbocharged 1.5-litre four-cylinder engine producing 108 kW (145 hp; 147 PS) paired with a six-speed dual-clutch transmission.
