= Lepas (marque) =

Marque of vehicle manufacturer Chery

- Type: Division
- Industry: Automotive
- Founded: April 2025; 1 year ago
- Headquarters: Wuhu, Anhui, China
- Area served: Worldwide (except China, US, Canada)
- Key people: Zhong Wei (deputy CEO)
- Products: Automobiles
- Parent: Chery Automobile
- Website: lepasinternational.com

Lepas is a brand of Chinese vehicle manufacturer Chery that was established in 2025. It is a sub-division of Chery International, and will only be marketed outside China to support Chery's export strategy.

The brand was announced in a brand convention in Wuhu, Anhui, China in April 2025. Its first model, the Lepas L8, rolled off the production line on 22 April 2025. The brand introduced its new logo in July 2025, during its auto show debut at the 32nd Gaikindo Indonesia International Auto Show. The brand intends to sell 500,000 units globally within three years of its launch, targeting 27 countries by the end of 2025, with plans to reach 45 countries by 2027.

== Products ==
=== Current models ===
- Lepas L4/E4 (2026–present), rebadged second-generation Chery Tiggo 5
- Lepas L6 (2026), rebadged Chery Fulwin T7
- Lepas L8 (2025–present), rebadged second-generation Chery Tiggo 8
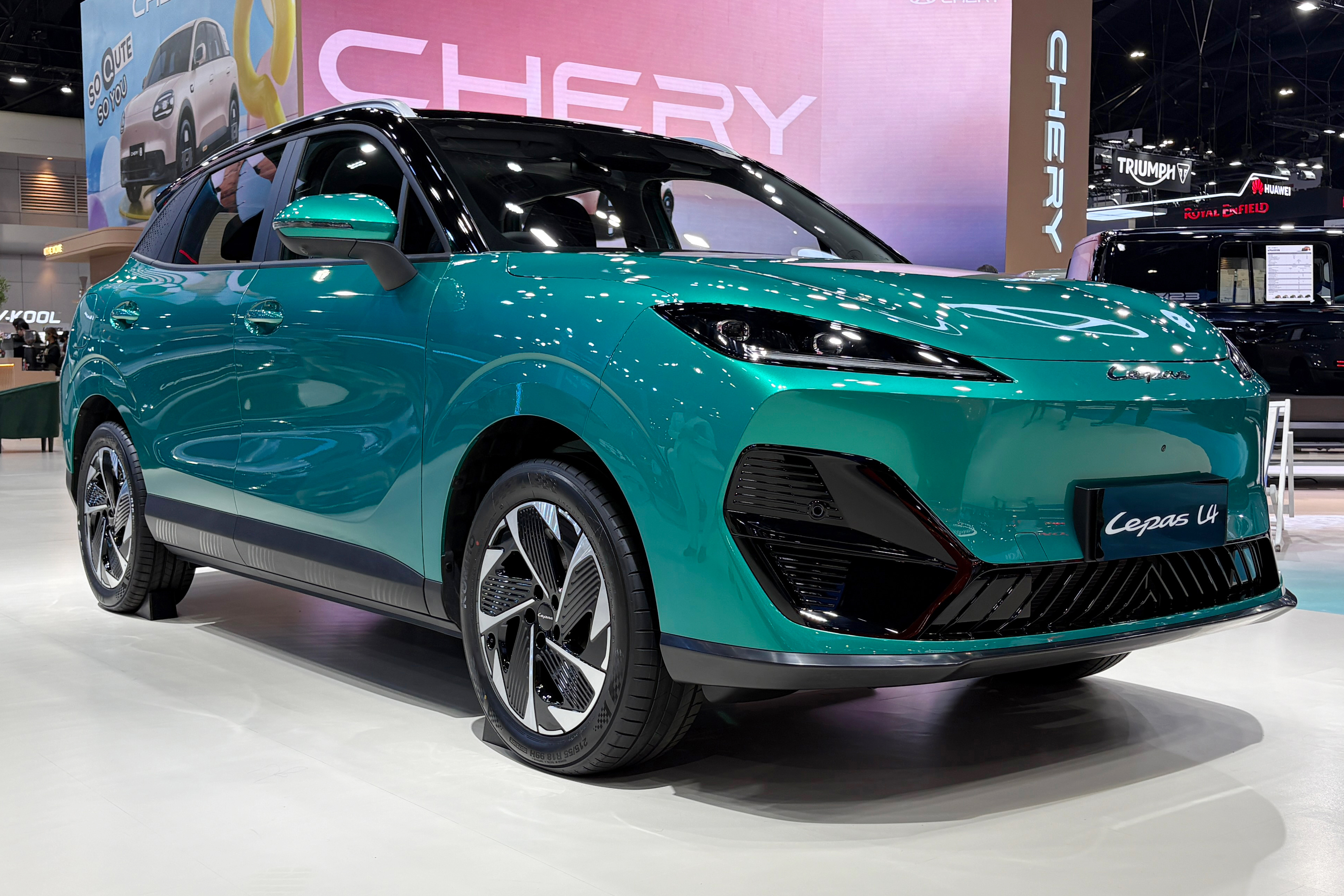
Lepas L4 EV

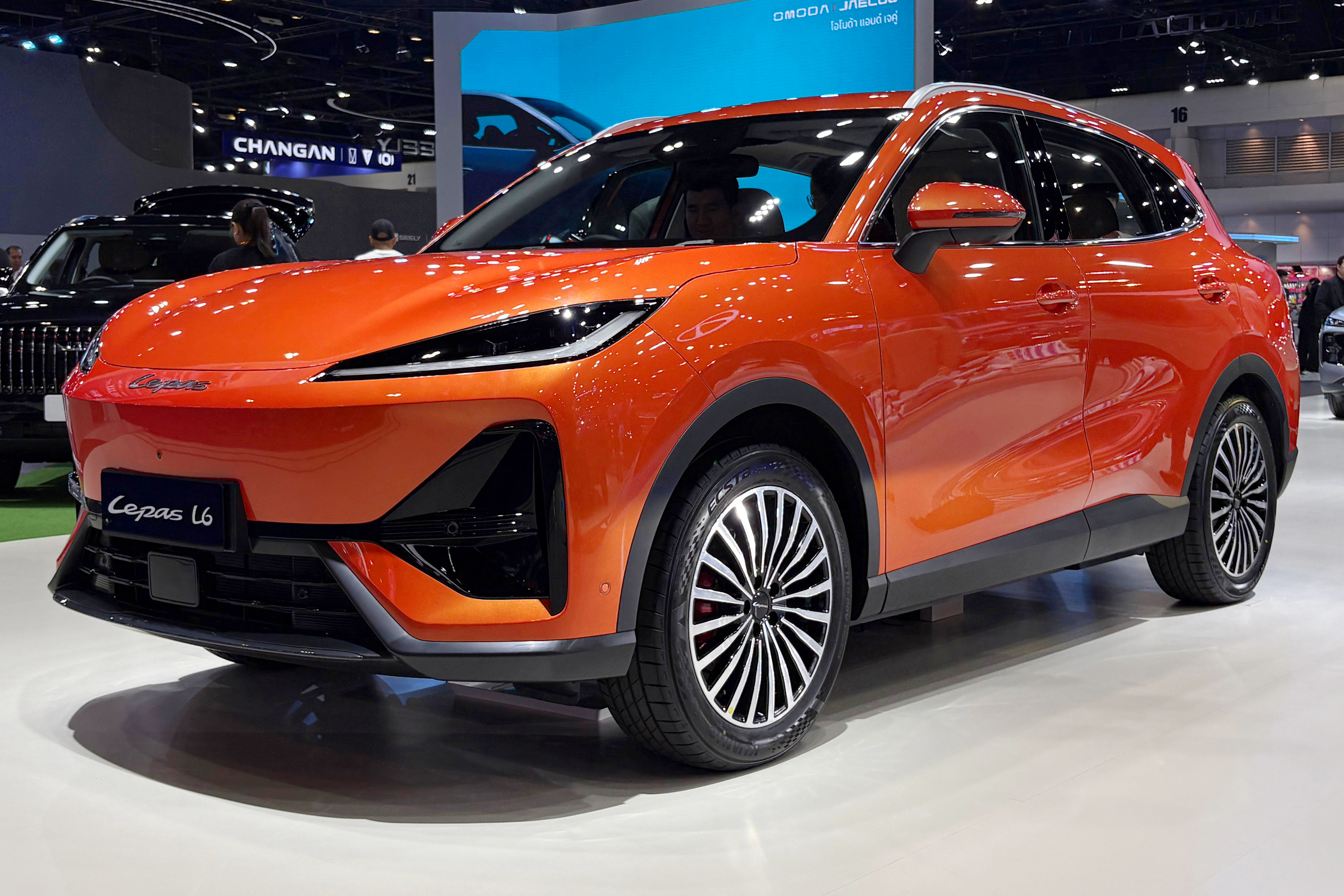
Lepas L6 EV

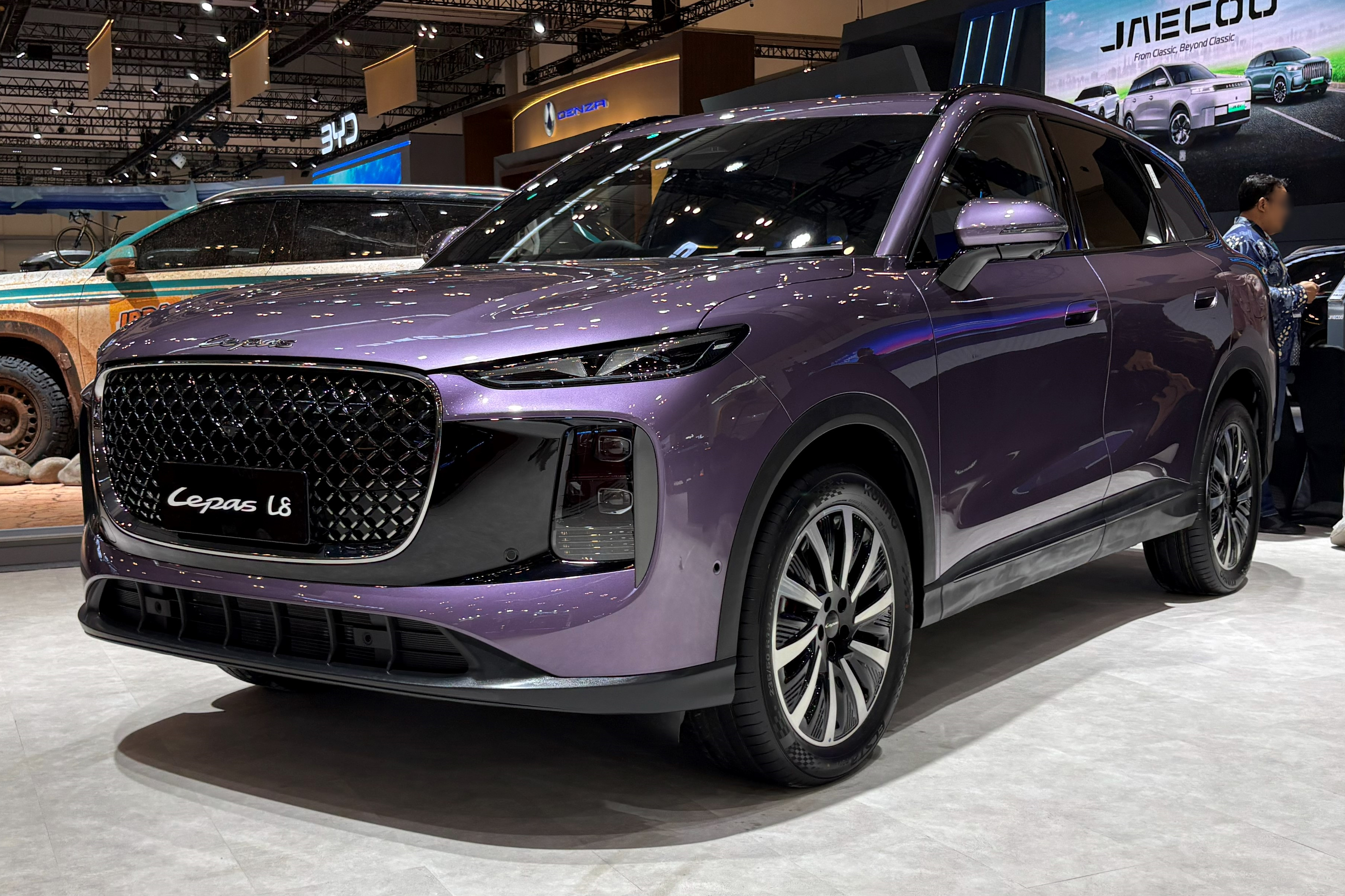
Lepas L8 PHEV

=== Planned ===
- Lepas L1
- Lepas L2
- Lepas L3
- Lepas L9

== See also ==
- Omoda
- Jaecoo
- Jetour
- Exeed
- Luxeed
- iCar
- Karry
