= Chery Fulwin T7 =

Compact crossover SUV

Overview
- Manufacturer: Chery
- Also called: Lepas L6; Lepas E6 (electric); Tenet Plus L6 (Russia)
- Production: 2025–present
- Assembly: China: Wuhu, Anhui; Thailand: Rayong (Omoda & Jaecoo Manufacturing (Thailand)); Russia: St. Petersburg (AGR Holding); Indonesia: Bekasi, West Java (HIM)

Body and chassis
- Class: Compact SUV
- Body style: 5-door crossover SUV
- Layout: Rear-motor, rear-wheel-drive (EV); Front-motor, front-wheel-drive (Lepas L6 EV); Front-engine, front-motor, front-wheel-drive/all-wheel-drive (PHEV)
- Platform: Chery T1X platform
- Related: Jaecoo J7; Chery Tiggo 7

Powertrain
- Engine: Petrol: 1.5 L SQRH4J15 turbo I4; Petrol hybrid: 1.5 L E4T15B I4 (CSH Hybrid)
- Electric motor: Fulwin T7 / Lepas L6 PHEV: 178 kW (242 PS; 239 hp) permanent magnet synchronous; Fulwin T7 EV / Lepas L6: 160–178 kW (218–242 PS; 215–239 hp) permanent magnet motor/generator
- Power output: 108 kW (147 PS; 145 hp) (Lepas L6 ICE; South Affrica); 202 kW (275 PS; 271 hp) (PHEV)
- Transmission: DHT (DHT150, CSH Hybrid)
- Hybrid drivetrain: Kunpeng Super Hybrid PHEV
- Battery: 65.05 or 67.08 kWh LFP Gotion High-Tech (EV); 18.66 kWh up to 32.7 kWh LFP Gotion (PHEV)
- Range: 600 km (373 mi) (CLTC); 500 km (311 mi) (NEDC)

Dimensions
- Wheelbase: 2,700 mm (106.3 in)
- Length: 4,570 mm (179.9 in)
- Width: 1,852 mm (72.9 in)
- Height: 1,694 mm (66.7 in)

The Chery Fulwin T7 (Chinese: 风云T7; pinyin: Fēngyún T7) is a compact SUV produced by the Chinese automaker Chery under the Chery Fulwin new energy vehicle product line.

The vehicle is also marketed internationally as the Lepas L6 under Chery's export-oriented Lepas brand in 2025 ahead of its introduction in the domestic market.

== Overview ==
The Fulwin T7 was launched as the Lepas L6 only to be rabadged as part of the Chery Fulwin lineup and launched in China as the Fulwin T7 in July 2026 to fit within the Fulwin series products.

Rear view

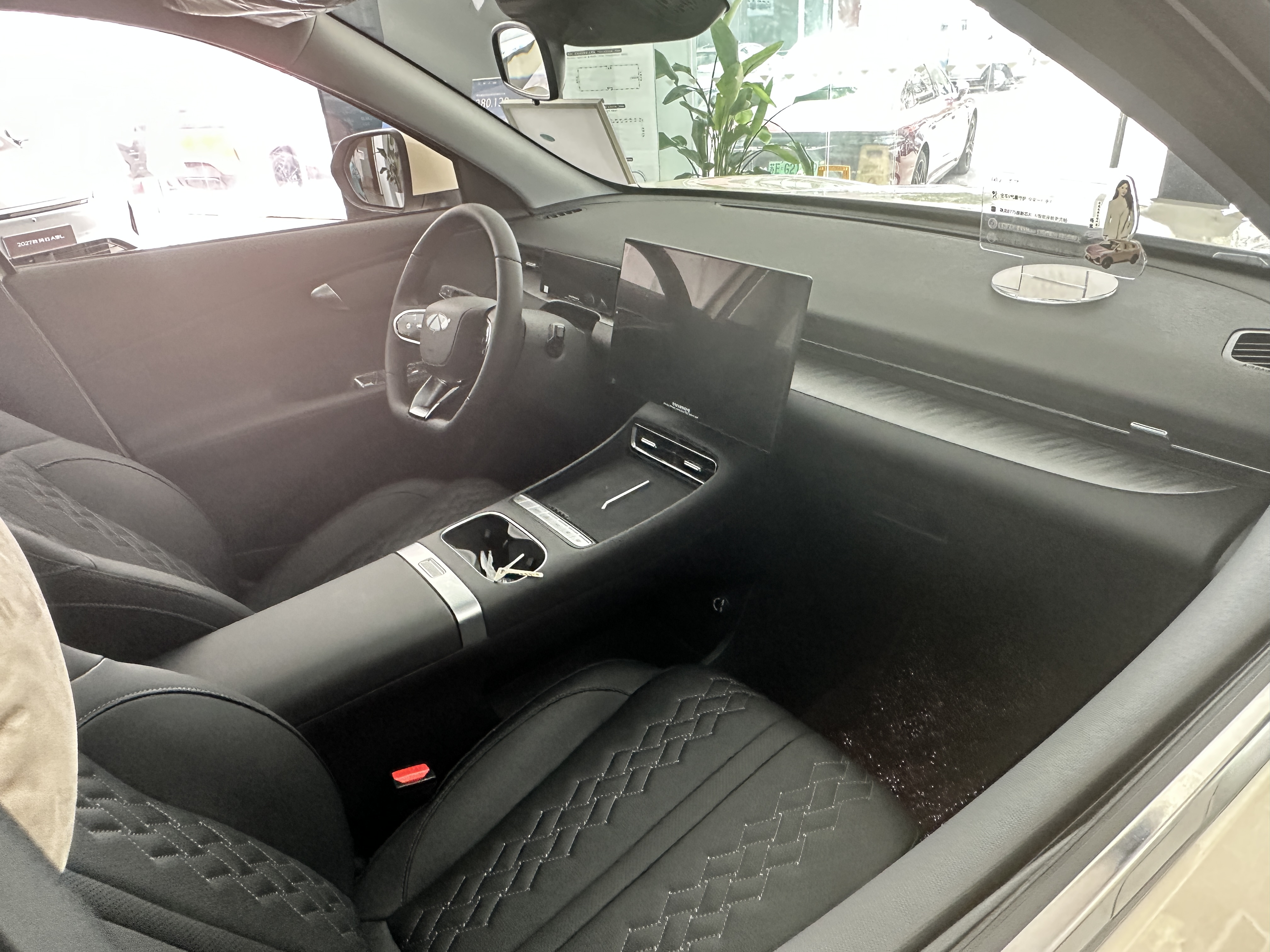
Interior

== Powertrain ==
The Fulwin T7 is expected to be offered with electrified powertrains. The Chery Fulwin T7 was later unveiled in China with the MIIT released photos published on 9 May 2026.

== Lepas L6 ==
The Lepas L6 is the rebadged export-market version of the Fulwin T7 sold under the Lepas brand. The Lepas L6 was displayed alongside other Lepas vehicles during the launch of the Lepas brand, which targets overseas markets including Southeast Asia, Europe and Australia.

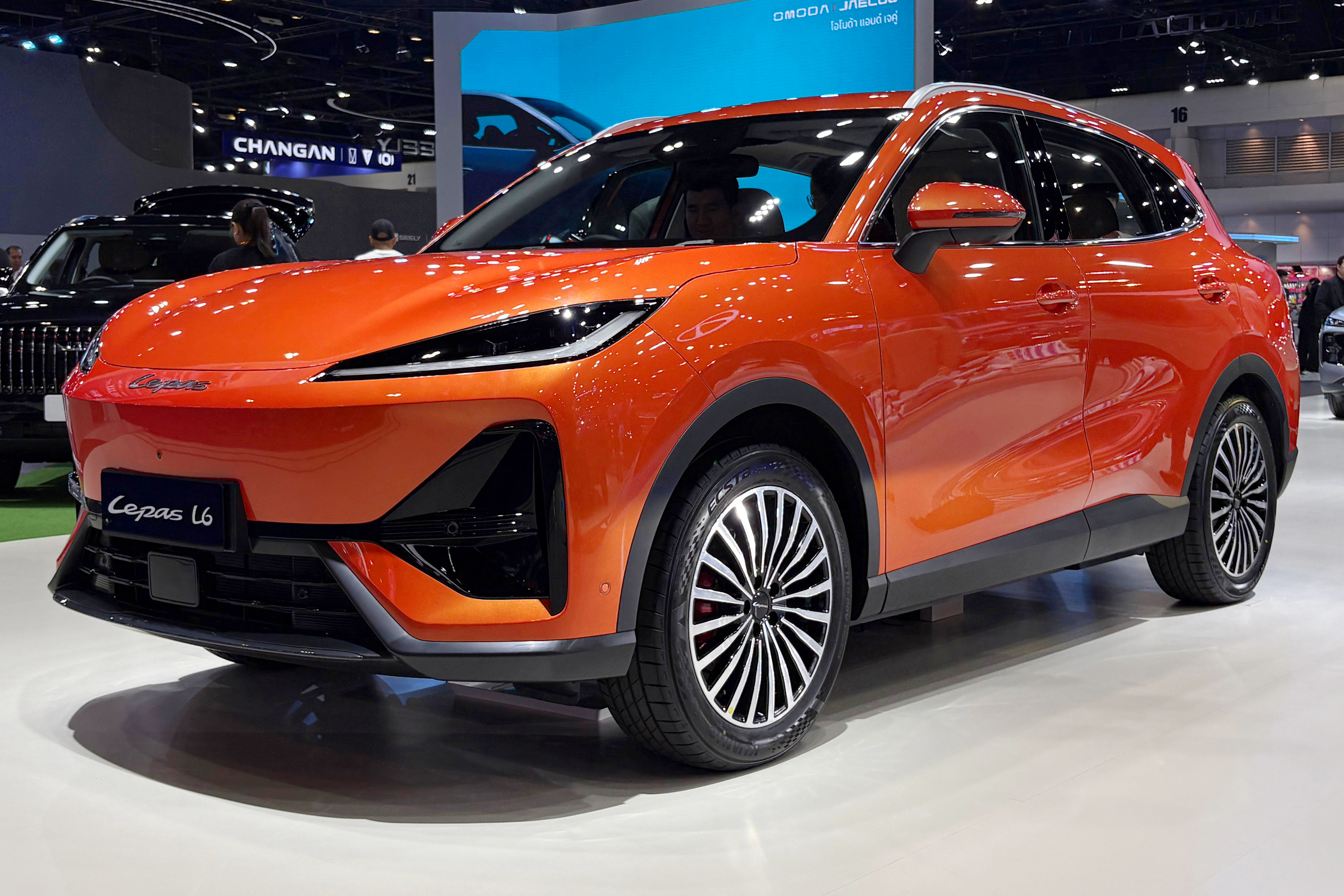
Lepas L6 EV

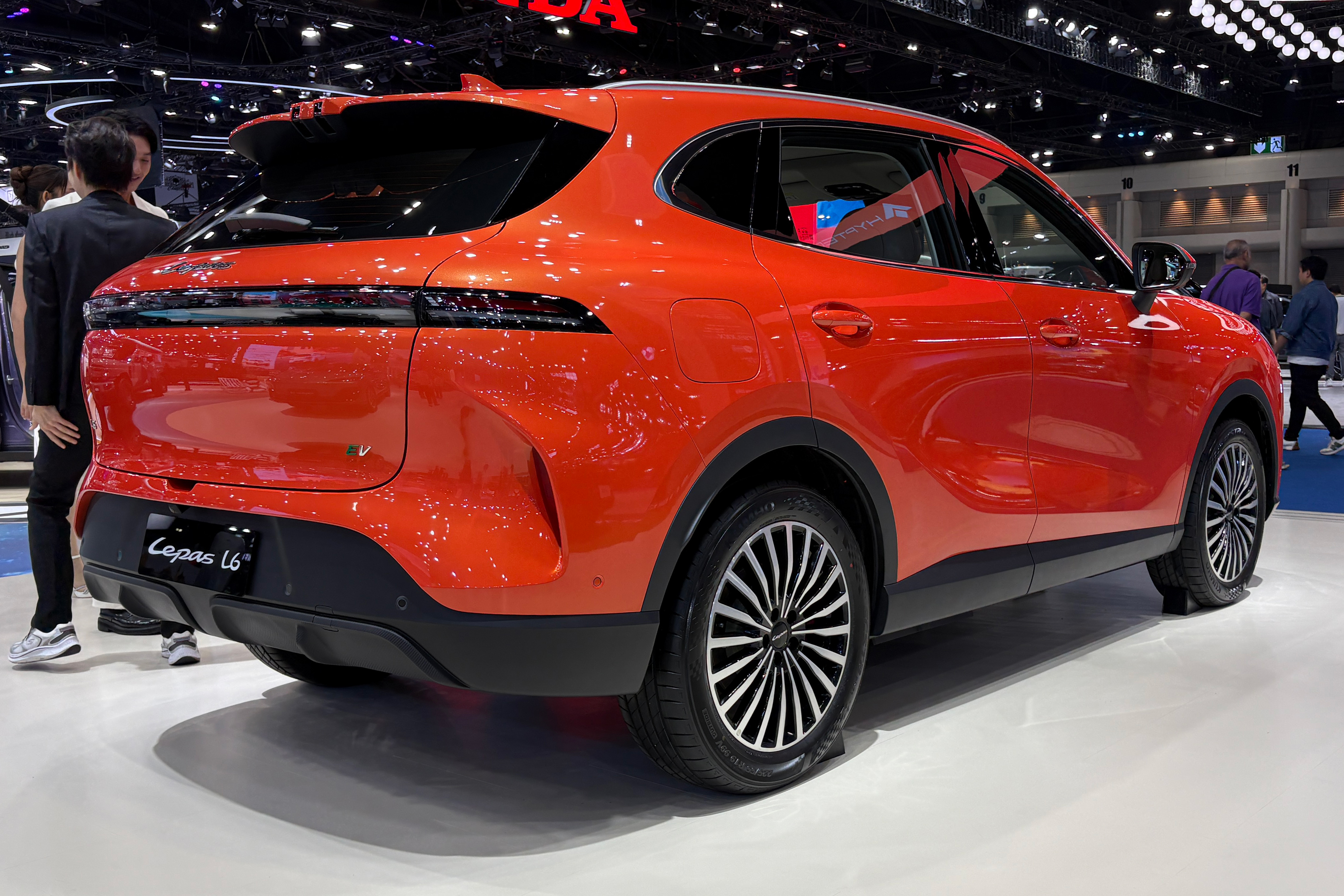
Rear view

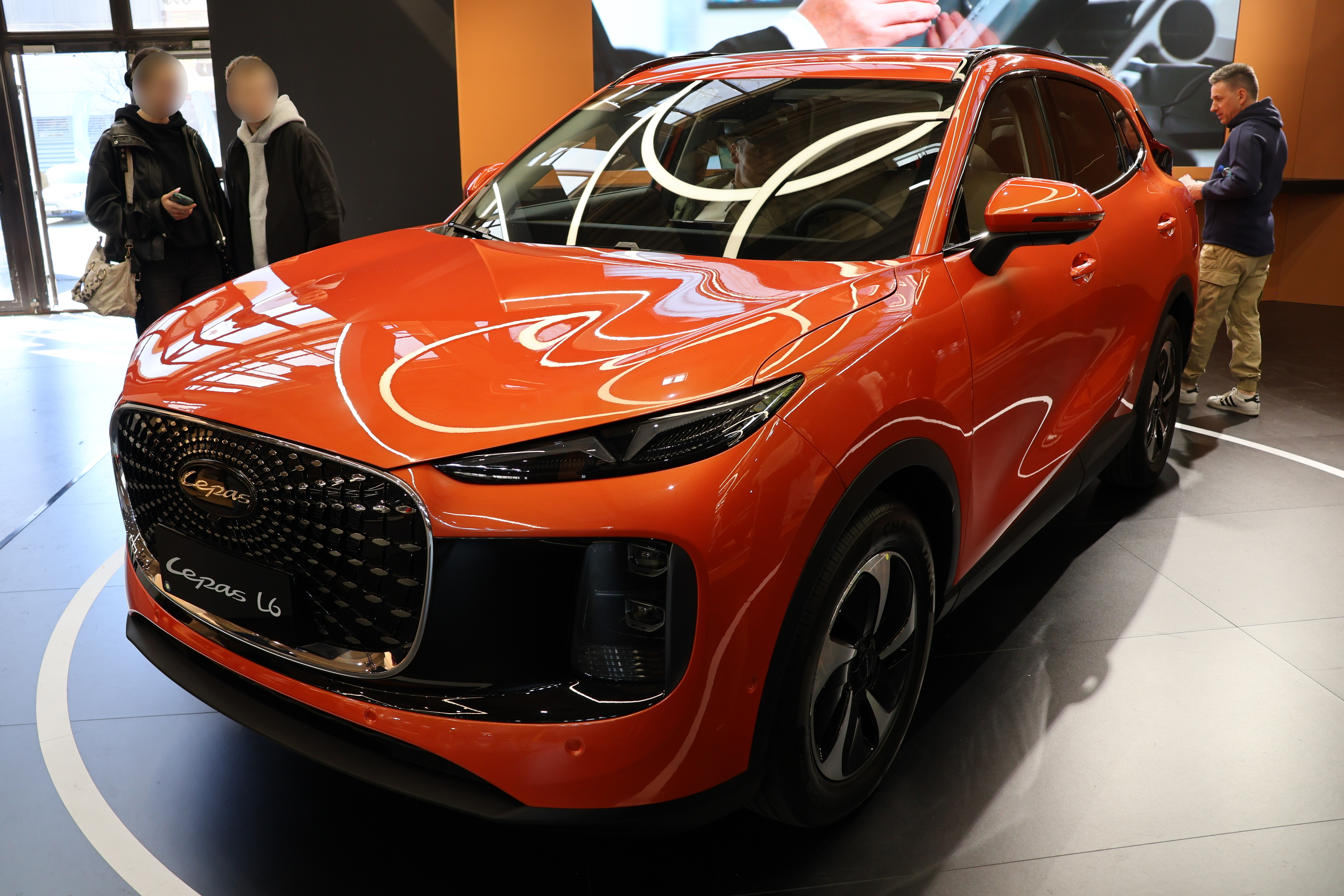
Lepas L6 PHEV

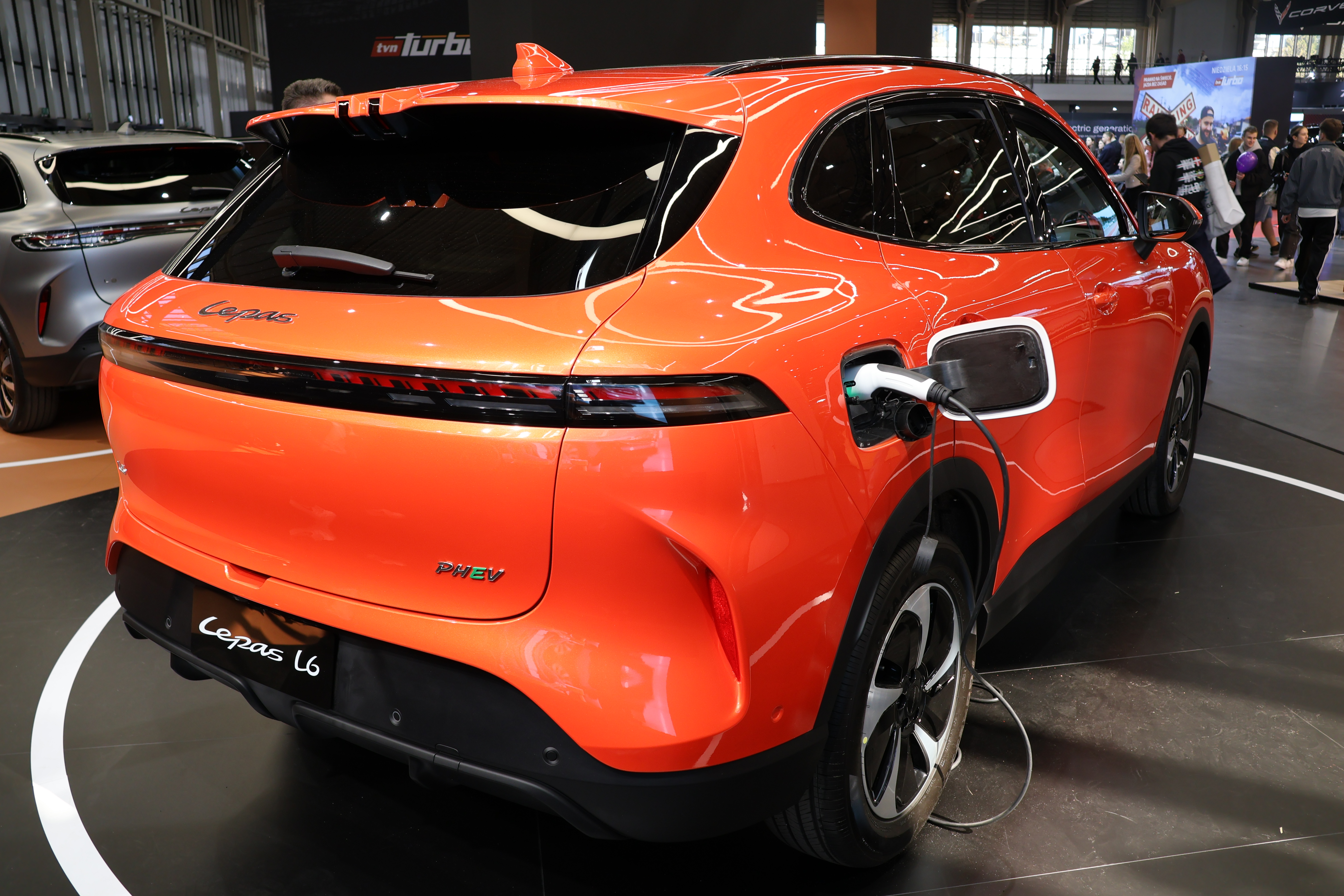
Rear view

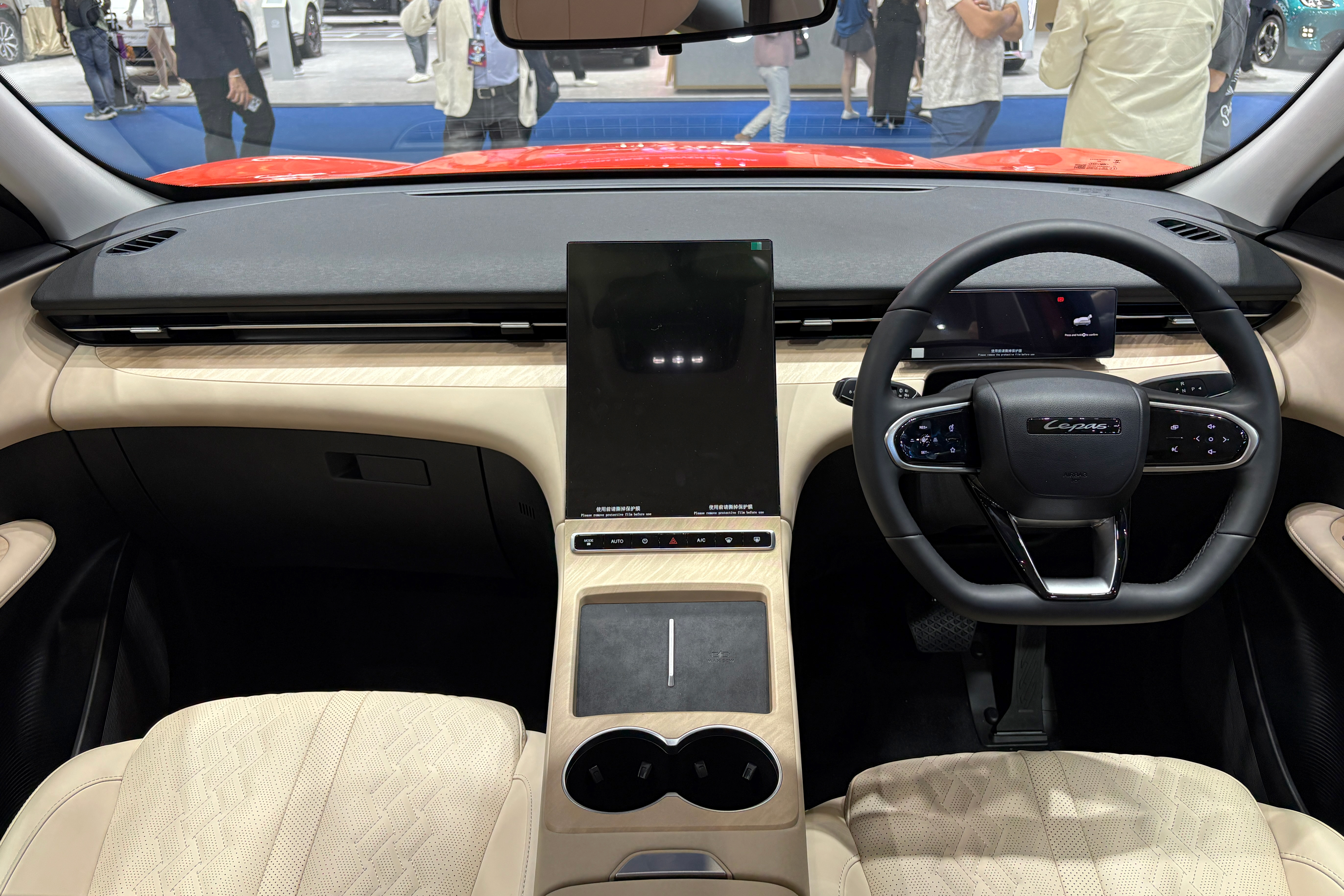
Interior

== Markets ==
=== Australia ===
The L6 EV was launched in Australia on 15 October 2026, in the sole Signature grade using the 65.05 kWh battery pack.

=== South Africa ===
The L6 was launched in South Africa on 14 August 2026, with two trim levels: Javan and Pantera, powered by the 1.5-litre turbocharged petrol.

=== Thailand ===
The L6 EV was launched in Thailand on 24 July 2026, with two variants: Comfort and Premium, using the 65.05 kWh battery pack.

== Sales ==
After its launch in China on 26 August 2026 at the 2026 Chengdu Auto Show, the Fulwin T7 received 23,188 pre-orders within 24 hours.
