= L8 =

L8 may refer to:

- HMS L8, a British submarine
- L-8, an L-class blimp of the US Navy that turned up without its crew over Daly City, California in 1942
- Li L8, an electric SUV
- Lotta Schelin, a Swedish football player
- an internal designation for the Daimler CL.I German fighter aircraft
- ISO/IEC 8859-14 (Latin-8), an 8-bit character set
- Barcelona Metro line 8
- Lepas L8, a rebadged Chery Tiggo 8 mid size crossover SUV for the export market
- Aletra L8, a battery electric compact MPV

== See also ==
- Late (disambiguation), an homophone
- L8R (disambiguation), an abbreviation
- 8L (disambiguation)
