= 8L =

8L or 8-L may refer to:

- An abbreviation for 8 litres
- Lucky Air – IATA code
- Typ 8L, a model of Audi A3
- Kappa 8L, a model of Kappa (rocket)
- F-8L, a model of Vought F-8 Crusader
- Nova 8L, proposed model of Nova (NASA rocket)
- HJ-8L, a model of HJ-8 missile
- FR-8L, a relabel of the Roland Rhythm 77
- Soyuz 8L, see Soyuz 7K-L1

== See also ==
- L8 (disambiguation)
