= Chery Tiggo 8 =

Mid-size crossover SUV

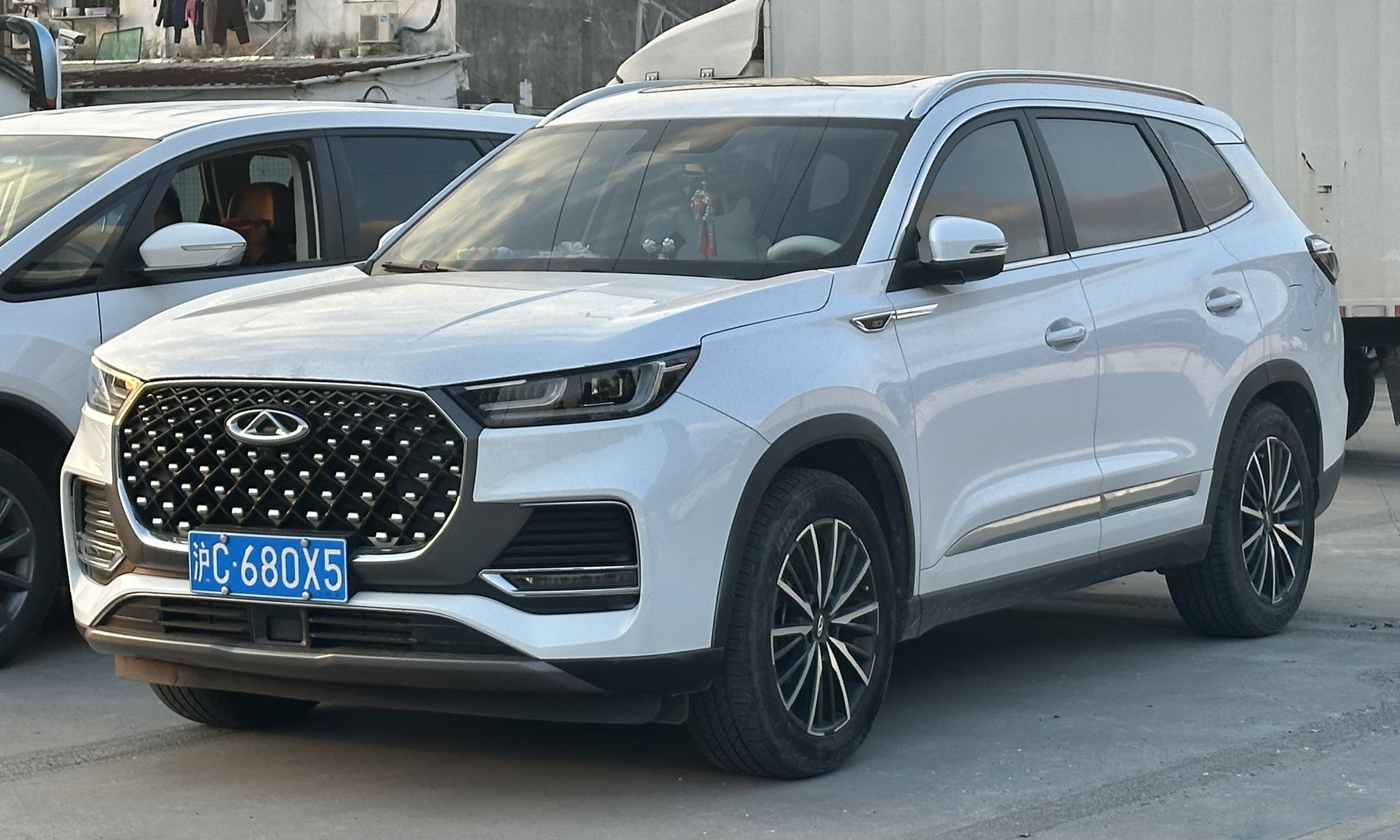
- Chery Tiggo 8 Plus

Overview
- Manufacturer: Chery
- Production: 2017–present

Body and chassis
- Class: Mid-size crossover SUV
- Body style: 5-door SUV

The Chery Tiggo 8 (Chinese: 奇瑞瑞虎8; pinyin: Qíruì Ruìhǔ 8) is a series of mid-size crossover SUVs, predominantly sold as a three-row vehicle, produced by Chery under the Tiggo product series. First introduced in 2018, it is positioned between the smaller Tiggo 7 and the larger Tiggo 9.

In China, a more upclass variant with an updated styling called the Chery Tiggo 8 Plus was launched in 2020. This version is marketed as the Chery Tiggo 8 Pro in overseas markets. Another newer variant with an altered styling also called the Tiggo 8 Pro was introduced to the Chinese market in 2022.

In 2024, Chery introduced the Chery Tiggo 8L, a larger model positioned between the Tiggo 8 and Tiggo 9. The model is exported as the Tiggo 9 for export markets, and was renamed to Tiggo 9X in September 2025 in China.

In 2025, Chery introduced the new generation of the Tiggo 8, which is marketed overseas as the Lepas L8.

== First generation (2017) ==
First generation
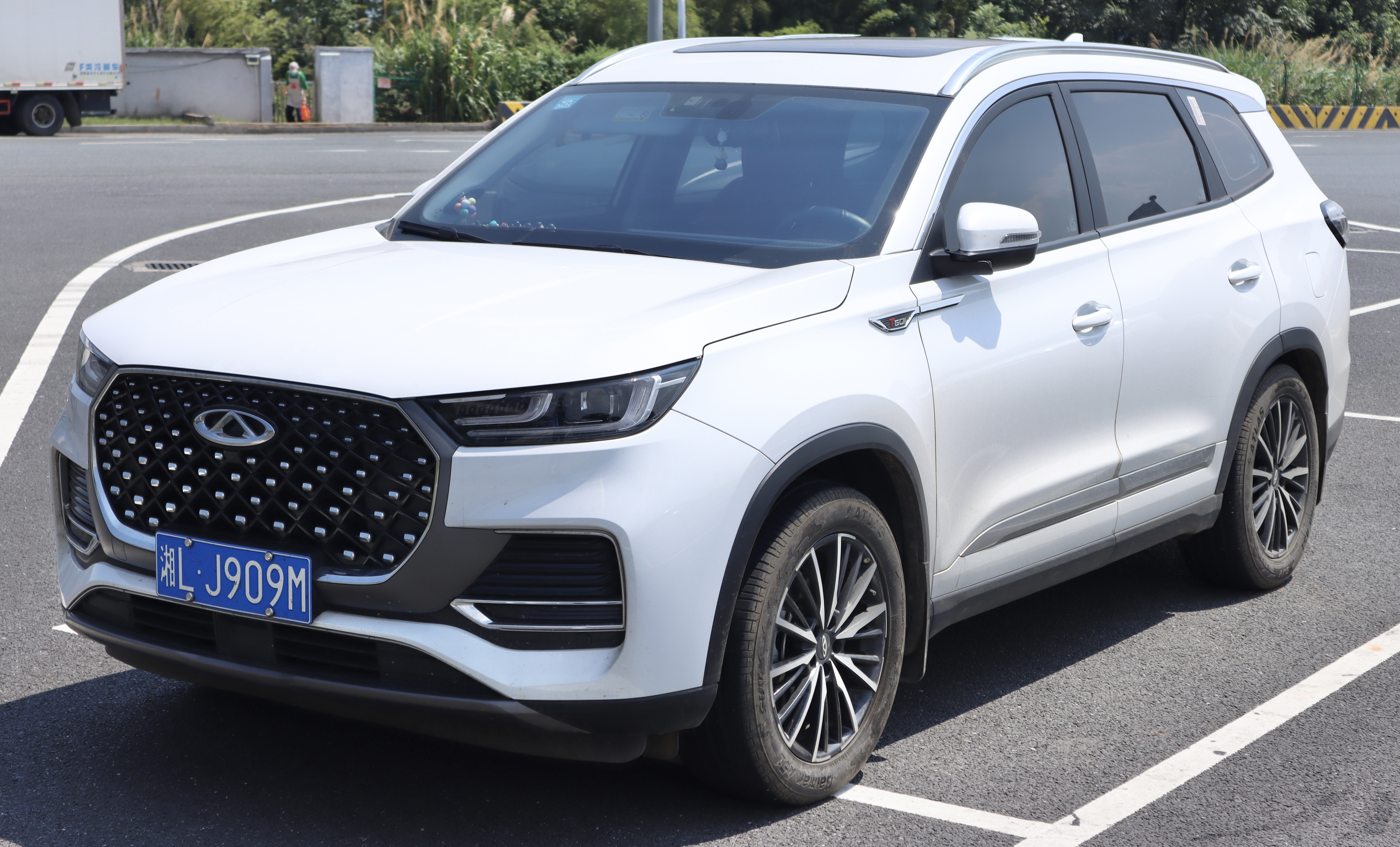
- Chery Tiggo 8 Plus

Overview
- Model code: T18
- Also called: Chirey Tiggo 8 (Mexico); Fownix Tiggo 8 (Iran); Chery Tiggo Grand Tour (Philippines); DR 7.0 (Italy); Sportequipe 7; Ebro S800 (Spain); Xcite X-Cross 8 (Russia, 2024–2025)
- Production: 2017–present
- Assembly: China: Wuhu, Anhui; Brazil: Anápolis (Caoa Chery); Indonesia: Bekasi, West Java (HIM); Malaysia: Kulim, Kedah (Inokom); Iran: Bam (MVM); Pakistan: Karachi (Ghandhara Nissan); Russia: Saint-Petersburg (Lada Saint Petersburg, Xcite X-Cross 8)
- Designer: Charles Chen

Body and chassis
- Layout: Front-engine, front-wheel-drive or four-wheel-drive
- Platform: T1X
- Related: Chery Tiggo 5x Chery Tiggo 7

Powertrain
- Engine: Petrol: 1.5 L SQRE4T15C turbo I4; 1.6 L F4J16 turbo I4; 2.0 L F4J20 turbo I4; 2.0 L SQRD4T20 turbo I4; Petrol plug-in hybrid: 1.5 L E4T15C turbo I4
- Electric motor: Permanent magnet synchronous reluctance (PHEV)
- Power output: Petrol: 115 kW (154 hp; 156 PS) (1.5 Turbo); 145 kW (194 hp; 197 PS) (1.6 Turbo; China); 180–187 kW (241–251 hp; 245–254 PS) (2.0 Turbo); plug-in hybrid: 255 kW (342 hp; 347 PS) (PHEV FWD); 368 kW (493 hp; 500 PS) (PHEV AWD)
- Transmission: 6-speed manual; 6-speed dual-clutch; 7-speed dual-clutch; 9-speed CVT; 3-speed DHT (PHEV)
- Hybrid drivetrain: Plug-in hybrid
- Battery: 18.3 kWh LFP battery (PHEV)
- Electric range: 90 km (56 mi) (PHEV) WLTP

Dimensions
- Wheelbase: 2,710 mm (106.7 in)
- Length: 4,700 mm (185.0 in); 4,722 mm (185.9 in) (Plus / global Pro); 4,745 mm (186.8 in) (Pro, China)
- Width: 1,860 mm (73.2 in)
- Height: 1,746 mm (68.7 in)

Chronology
- Predecessor: Rely X5; Chery Arrizo M7

The production of Tiggo 8 was revealed during the 2018 Beijing Auto Show in China, positioning the Tiggo 8 above the smaller Tiggo 7. Internally codenamed the T18, the Tiggo 8 rides on a unibody chassis that features MacPherson struts in the front and multi-link rear suspension systems. The wheels are 18-inch size and the ground clearance metric is 200 mm (7.9 in).

The engine of the Tiggo 8 is a 1.5-litre inline-four turbocharged petrol engine from the Tiggo 7 that produces 108 kW (145 hp; 147 PS) and 210 N⋅m (155 lb⋅ft; 21 kg⋅m) of torque. The engine is mated to a 6-speed dual-clutch transmission (DCT) and powerers the front wheels. For the 2019 model year, a 1.6-litre inline-four direct-injection turbocharged petrol engine mated with a 7-speed dual clutch transmission developing 145 kW (194 hp; 197 PS) and 290 N⋅m (214 lb⋅ft; 30 kg⋅m) is added to the product line, badged as "290T". For the 2021 model year, The 2.0T Kunpeng version badged as "390T" was introduced later, developing 187 kW (251 hp; 254 PS) and 390 N⋅m (288 lb⋅ft; 40 kg⋅m) of torque.

In late 2022, a new two-row five-seater model was launched alongside the existing seven-seater model. It is powered by a 1.5-litre inline-four SQRE4T15C turbocharged petrol engine rated at 115 kW (154 hp; 156 PS) and 230 N⋅m (170 lb⋅ft; 23 kg⋅m).

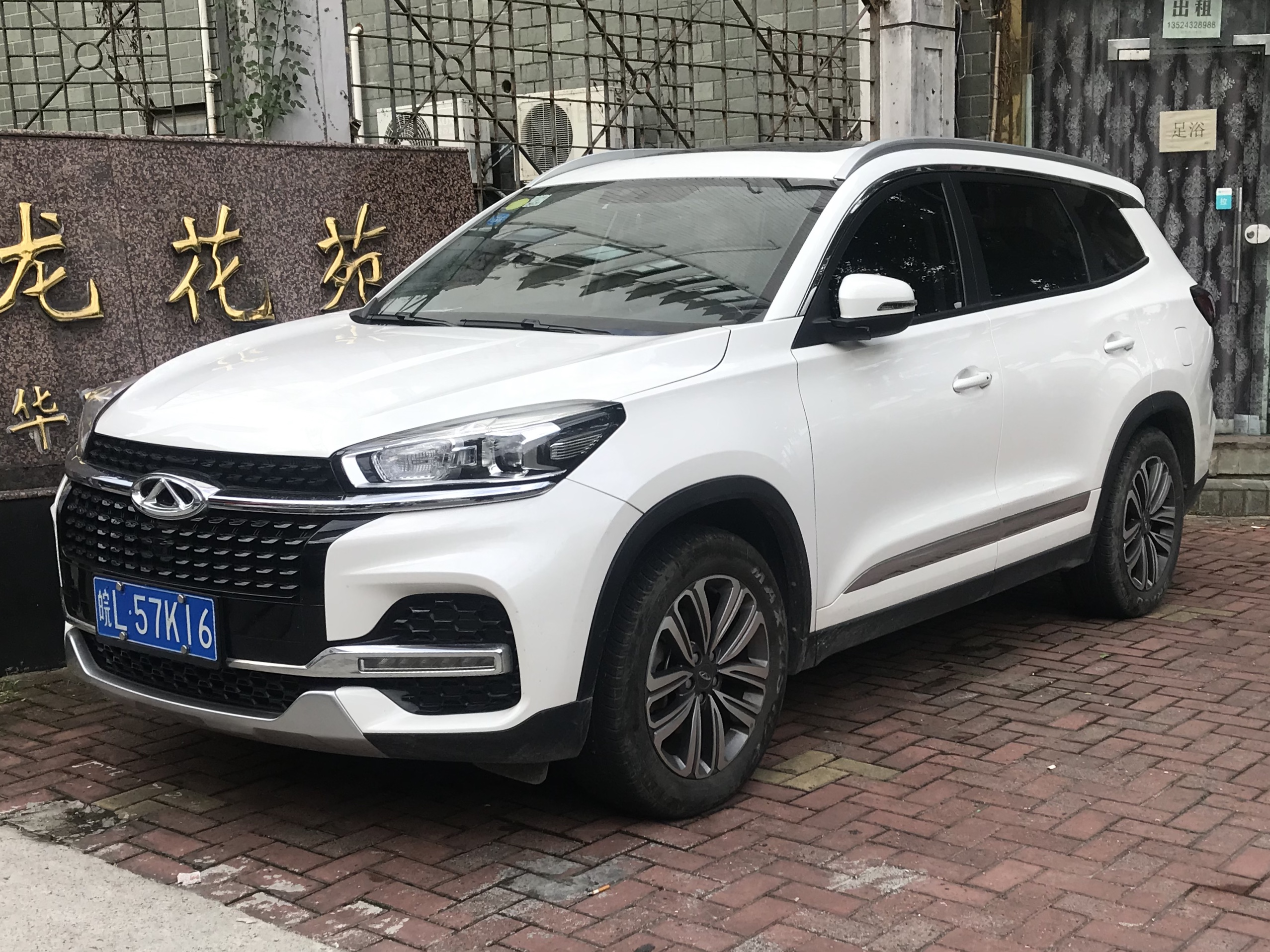
Tiggo 8 (front)

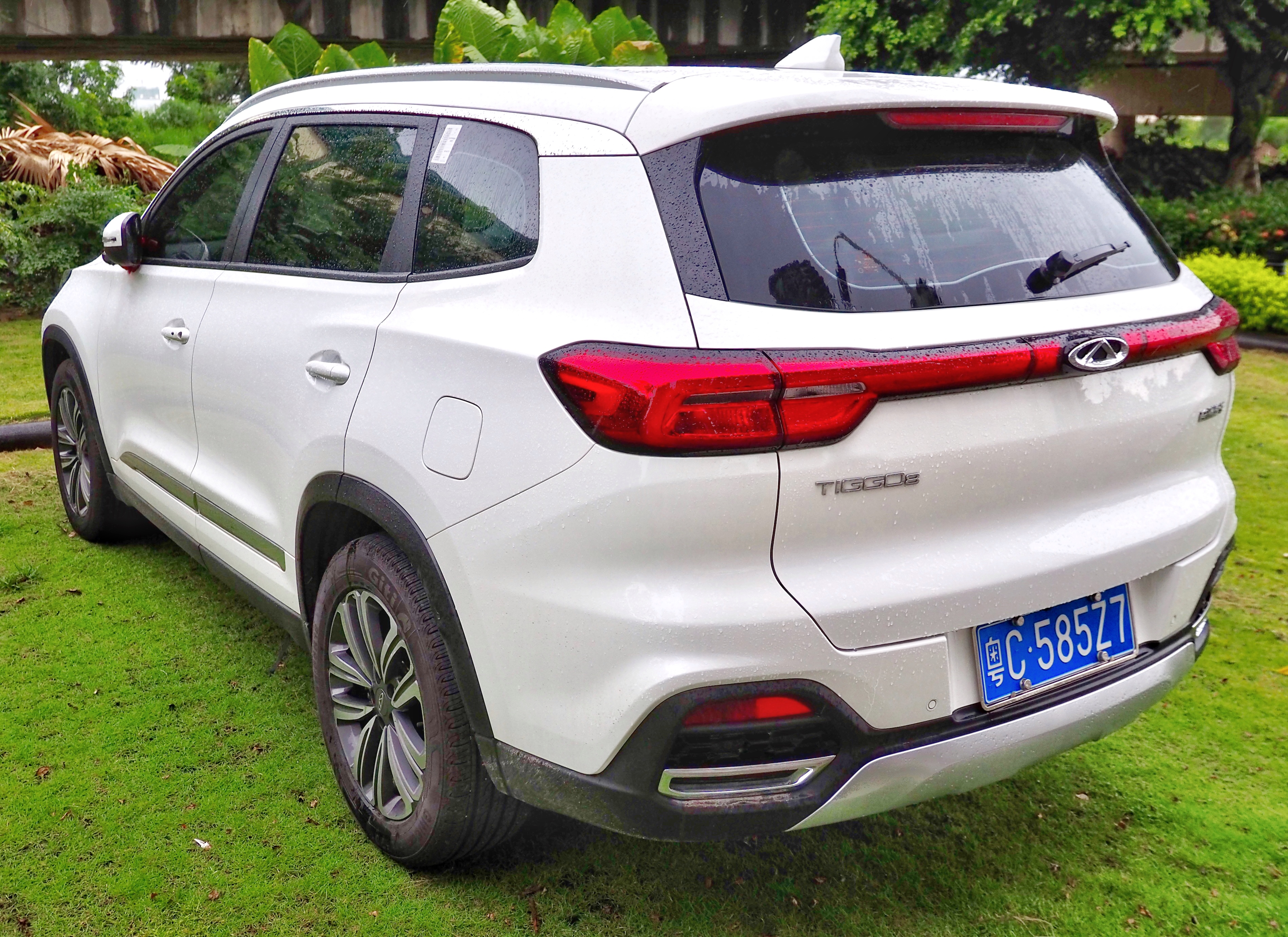
Tiggo 8 (rear)

=== Tiggo 8 Plus (2020–2024) ===
In October 2020, the Tiggo 8 Plus was unveiled as a more upmarket version for the Chinese local market. In overseas markets, it is marketed as the Tiggo 8 Pro or Tiggo 8 Pro Max, the latter for the model powered with the "390T" powertrain. The Tiggo 8 Plus sports redesigned front and rear ends with the "Life In Motion 3.0" design language and is 22 mm (0.9 in) longer and 1 mm (0.04 in) higher than the regular Tiggo 8. It is available as a 5-, 6- and 7-seater configurations with additional 18" and 19" redesigned alloys. The interior features dual 12.3 in (31.2 cm) displays with the LION4.0 infotainment system and surround 8-speaker stereo systems supplied by Sony.

The Tiggo 8 Plus is available with a 1.6-litre turbo engine developing 145 kW (194 hp; 197 PS) and 290 N⋅m (214 lb⋅ft) mated to a 7-speed DCT gearbox and a mild hybrid 1.5-litre turbo engine with 48V of electric power developing a combined 156 hp (116 kW; 158 PS) and 230 N⋅m (170 lb⋅ft) mated to a CVT gearbox. The Tiggo 8 Plus Kunpeng edition, it is powered by a 2.0-litre turbo badged as "390T", developing 187 kW (251 hp; 254 PS) and 390 N⋅m (288 lb⋅ft; 40 kg⋅m) of torque.

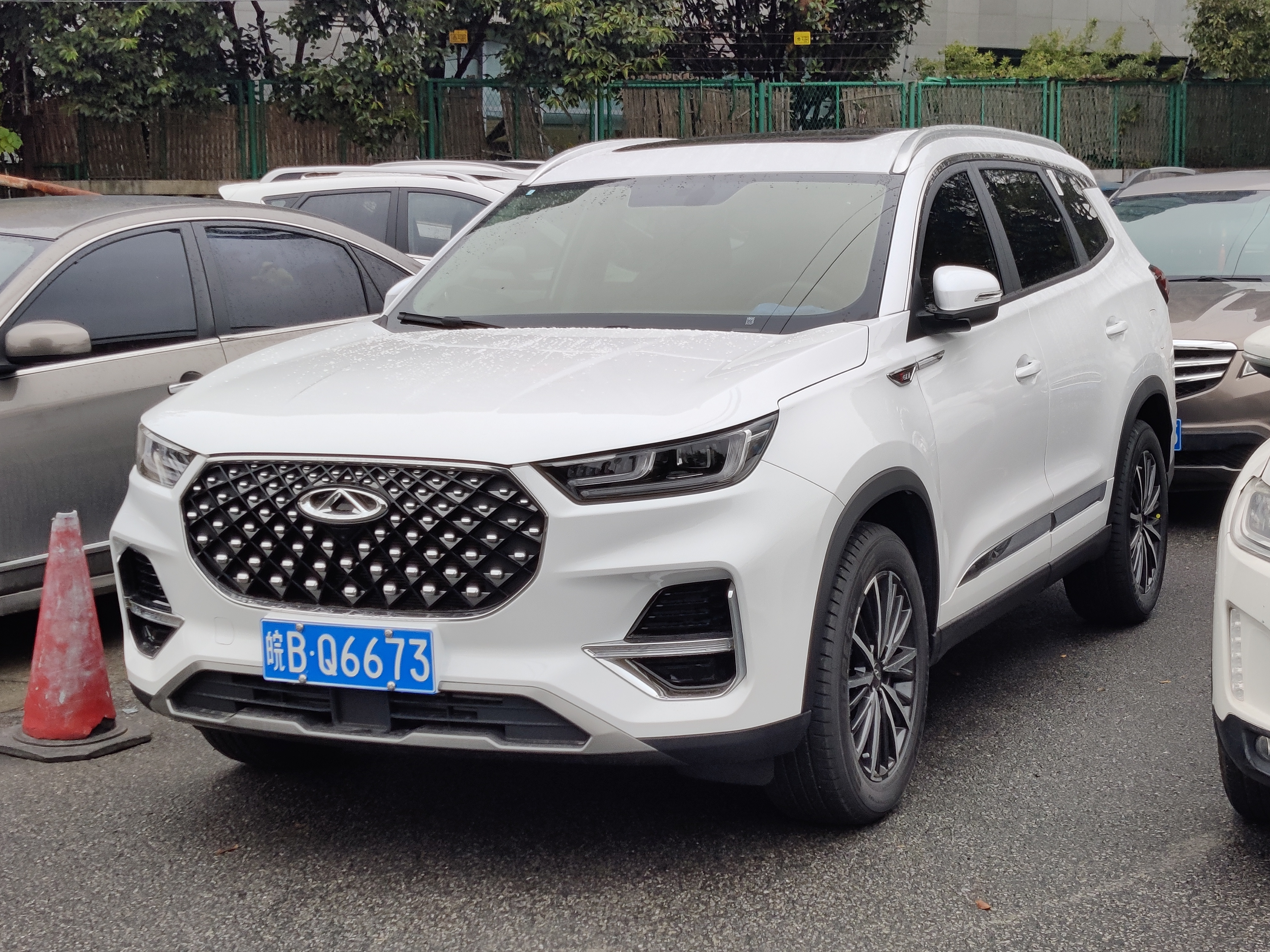
Tiggo 8 Plus

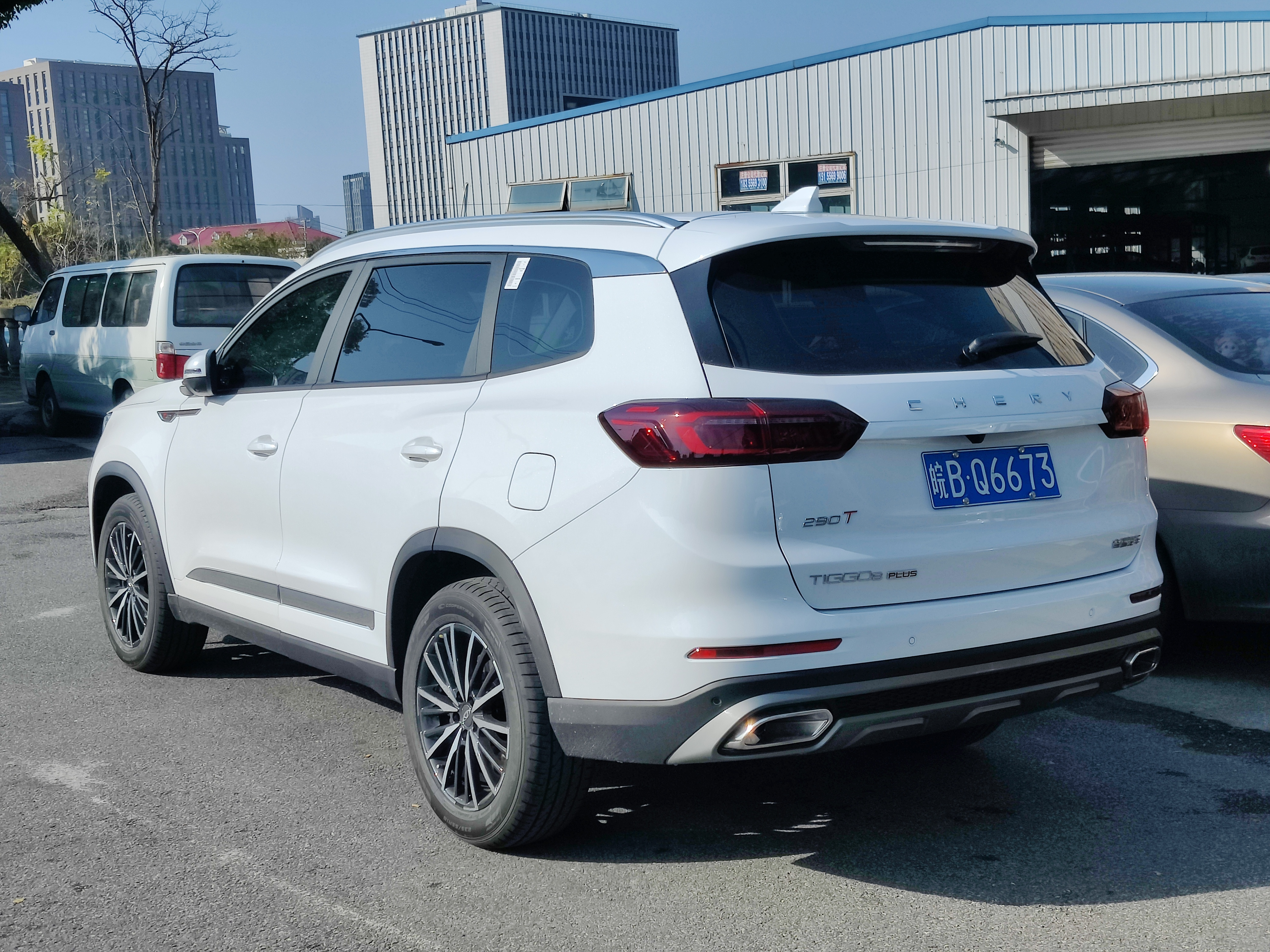
Rear view

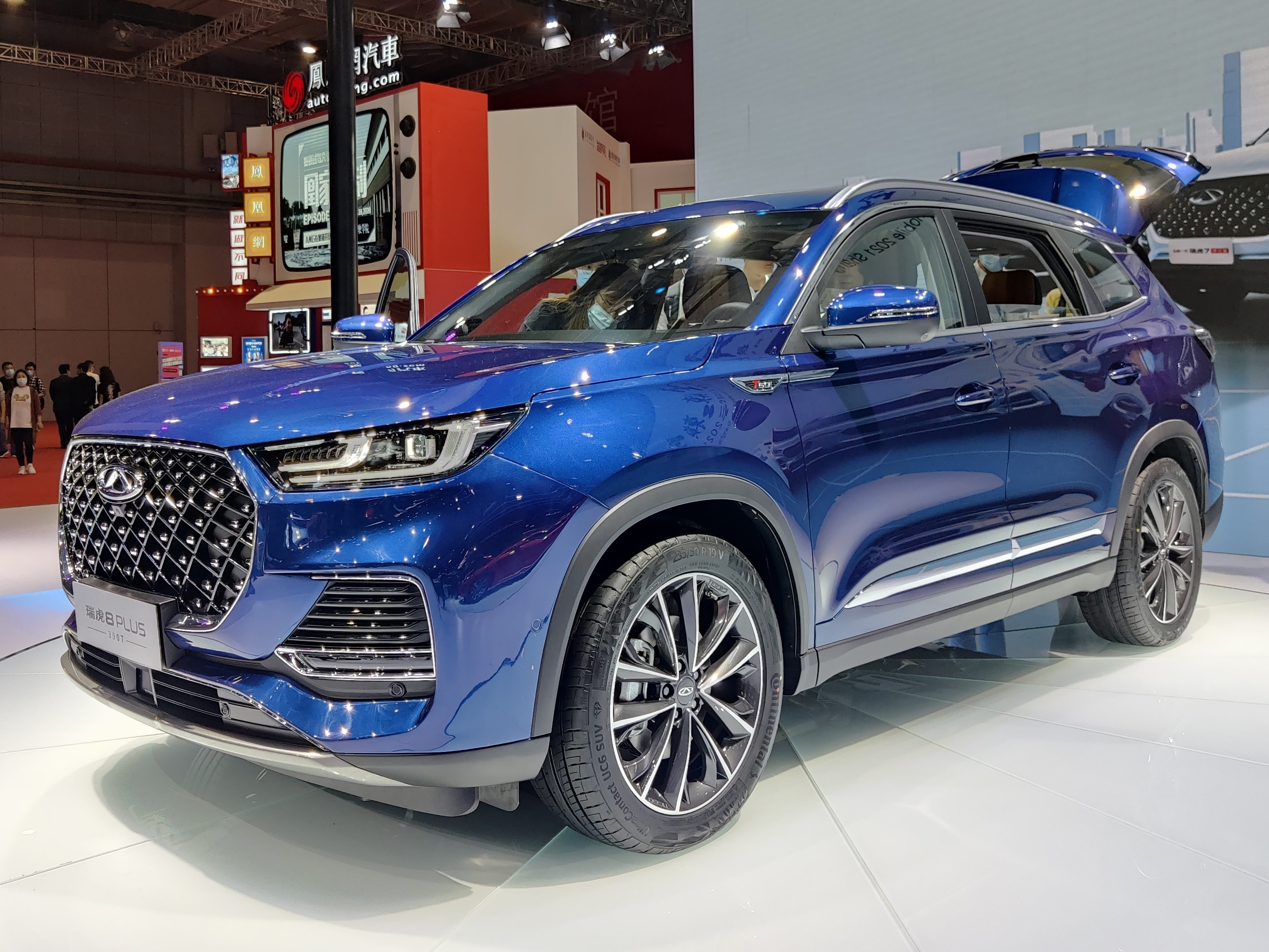
Tiggo 8 Plus Kunpeng e+ (390T)

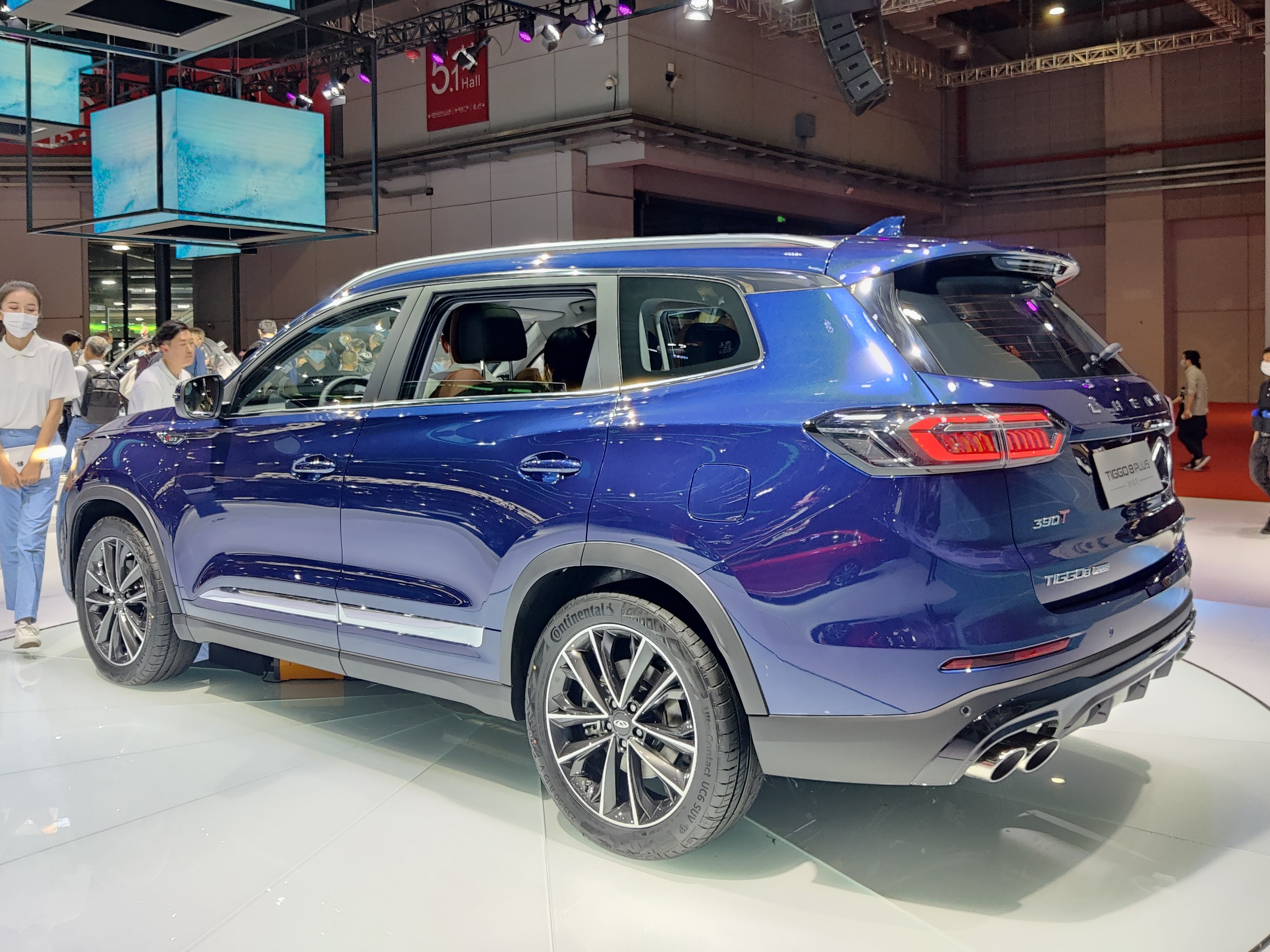
Rear view

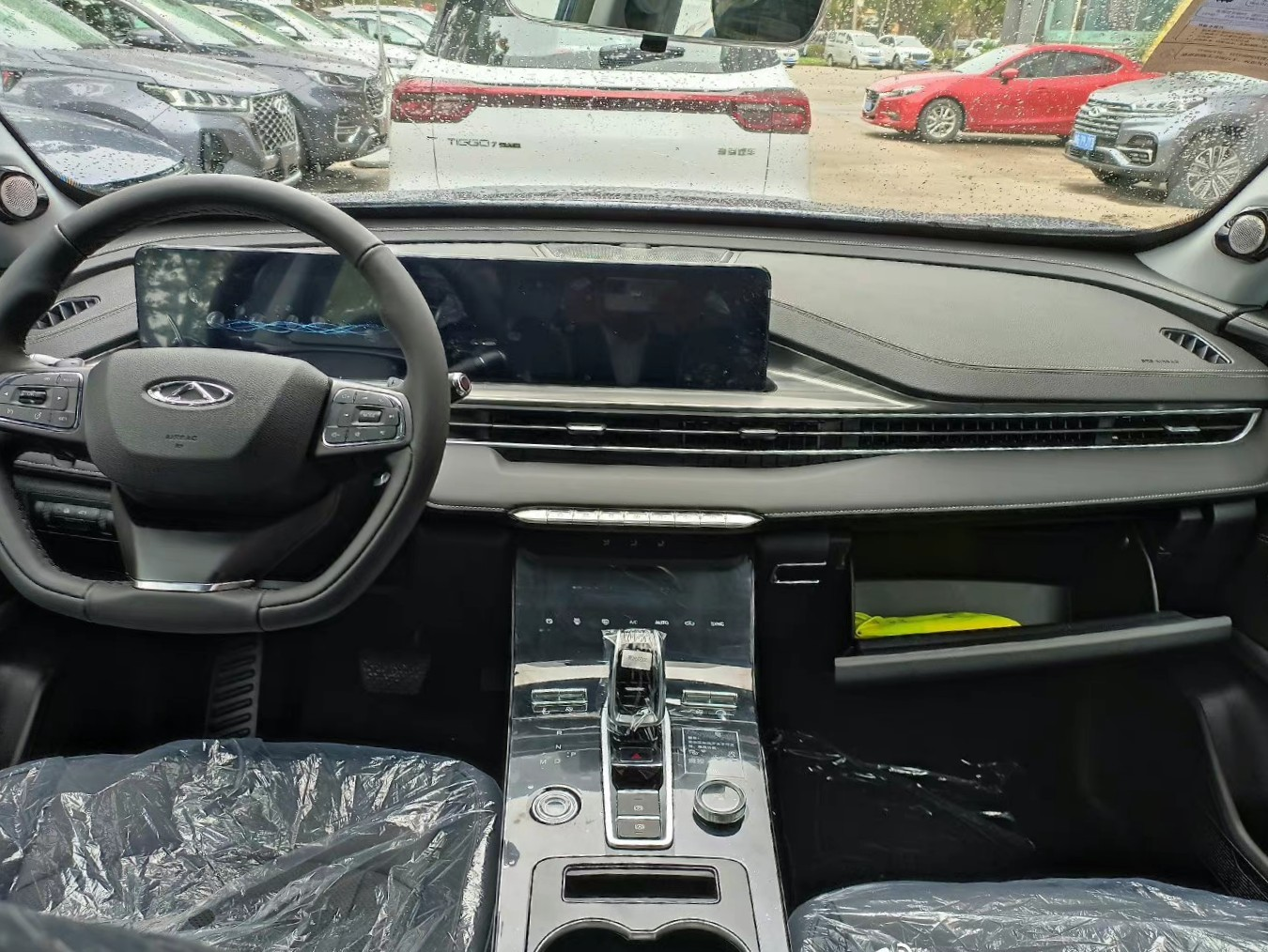
Interior

=== 2022 restyling (Chinese market Tiggo 8 Pro) ===
The Tiggo 8 Pro is the third variant of the Tiggo 8 product series in China and was launched in May 2022. It is not to be confused with the global market Tiggo 8 Pro, which is the export name for the Tiggo 8 Plus. The Tiggo 8 Pro features a restyled front and rear end designs with an updated interior. The Tiggo 8 Pro is powered by either a 2.0-litre TGDI turbo engine or a 1.6-litre TGDI turbo engine and Kunpeng DHT hybrid powertrains.

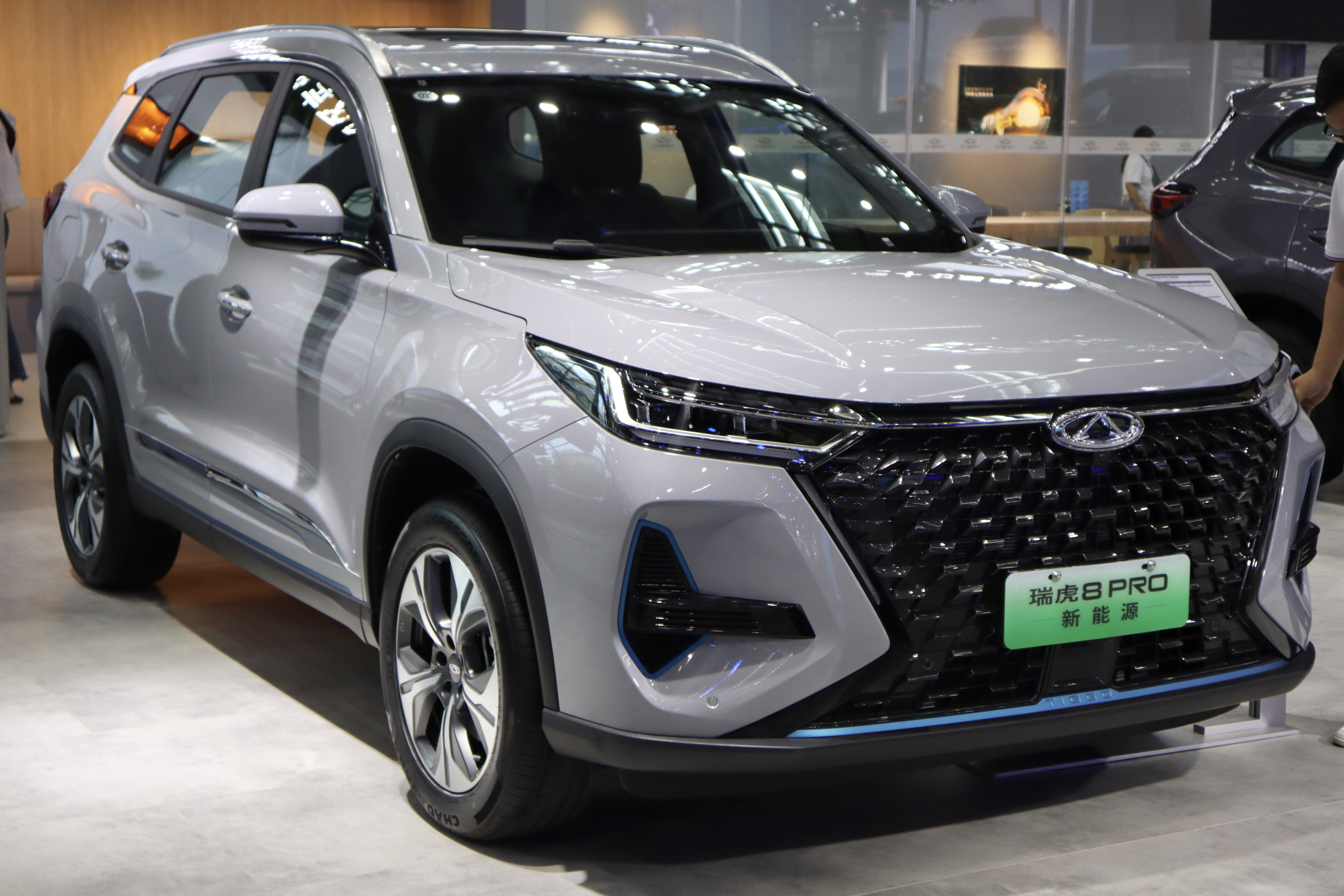
Tiggo 8 Pro PHEV

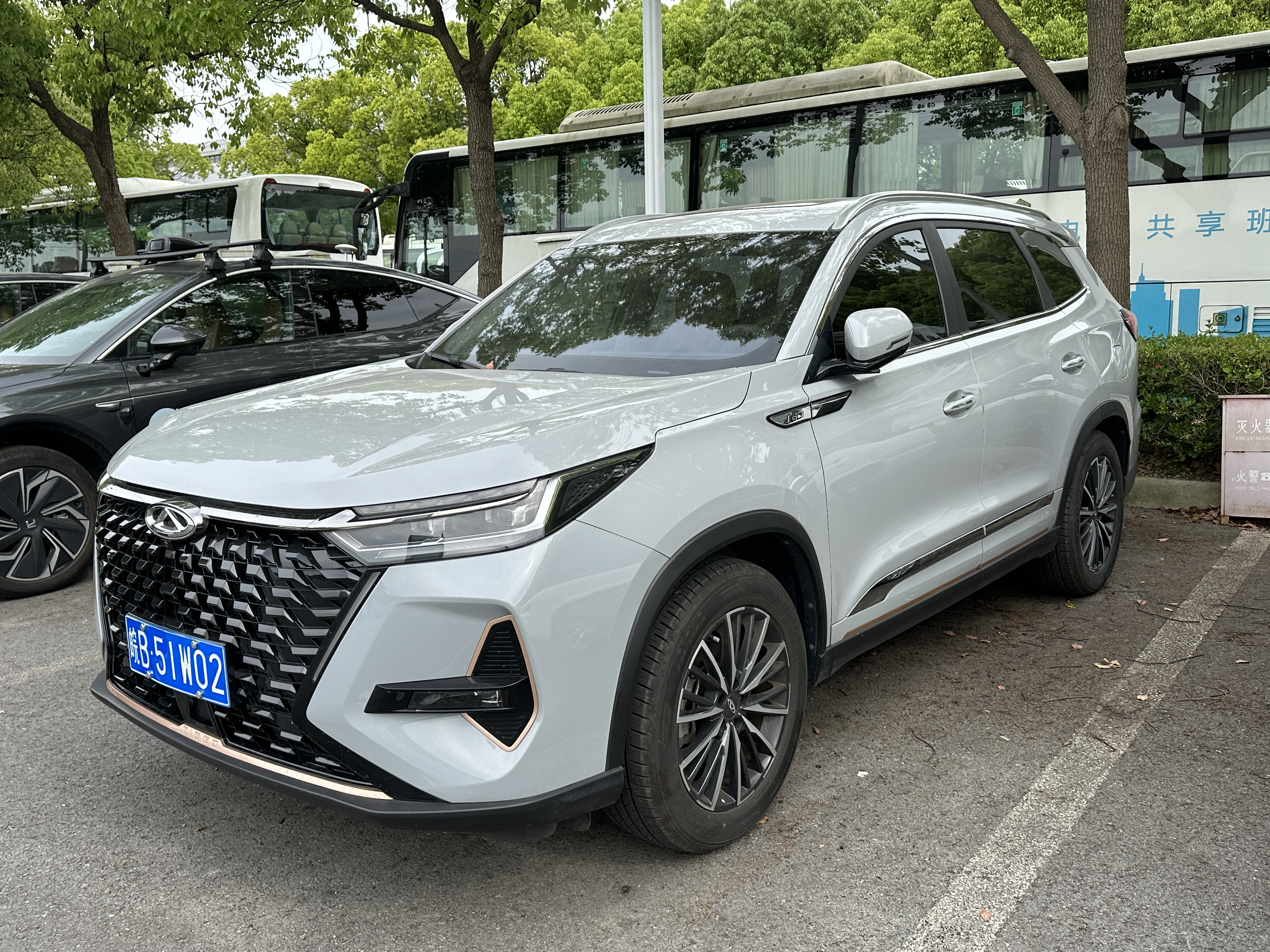
Tiggo 8 Pro

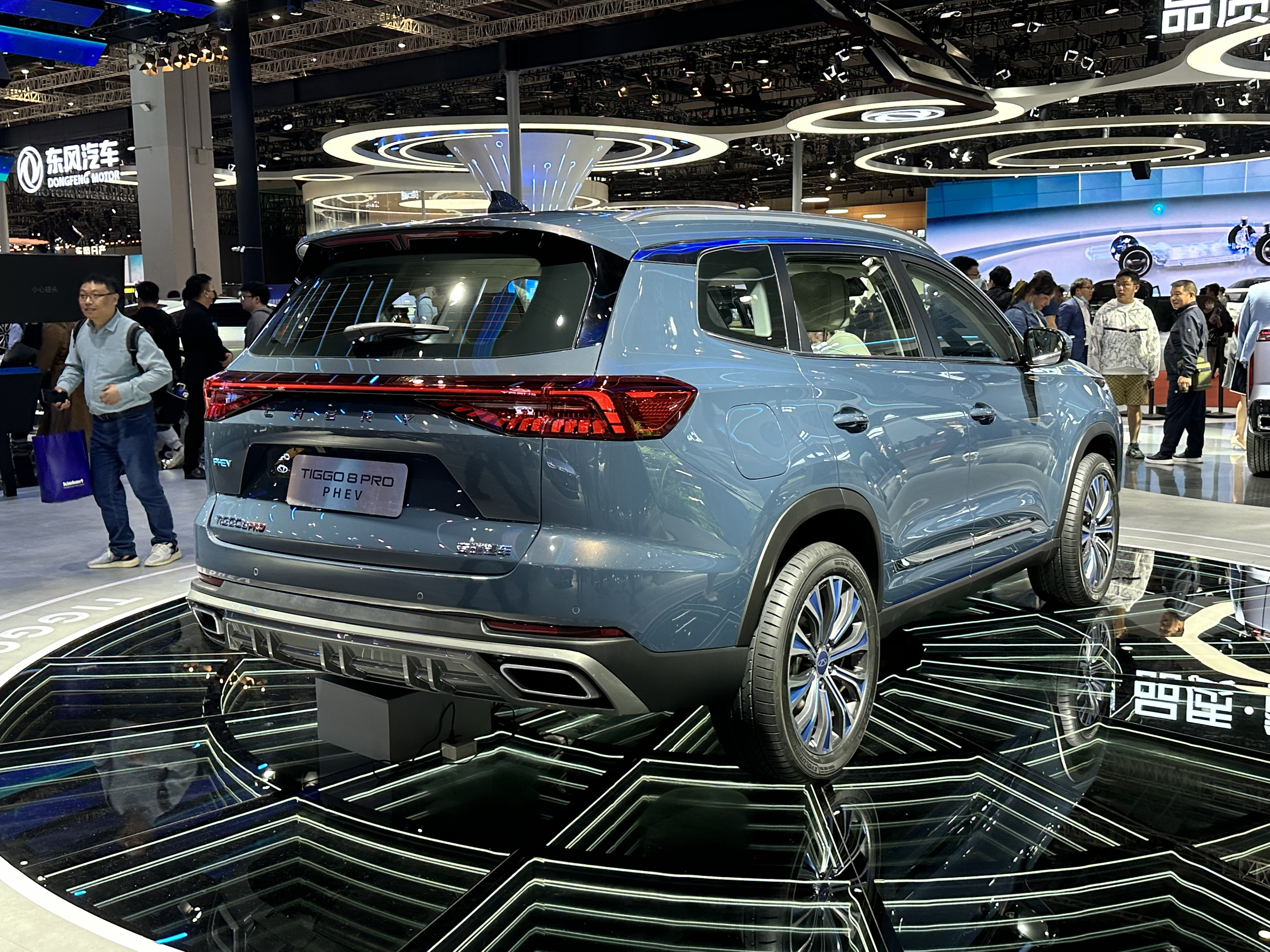
Rear view

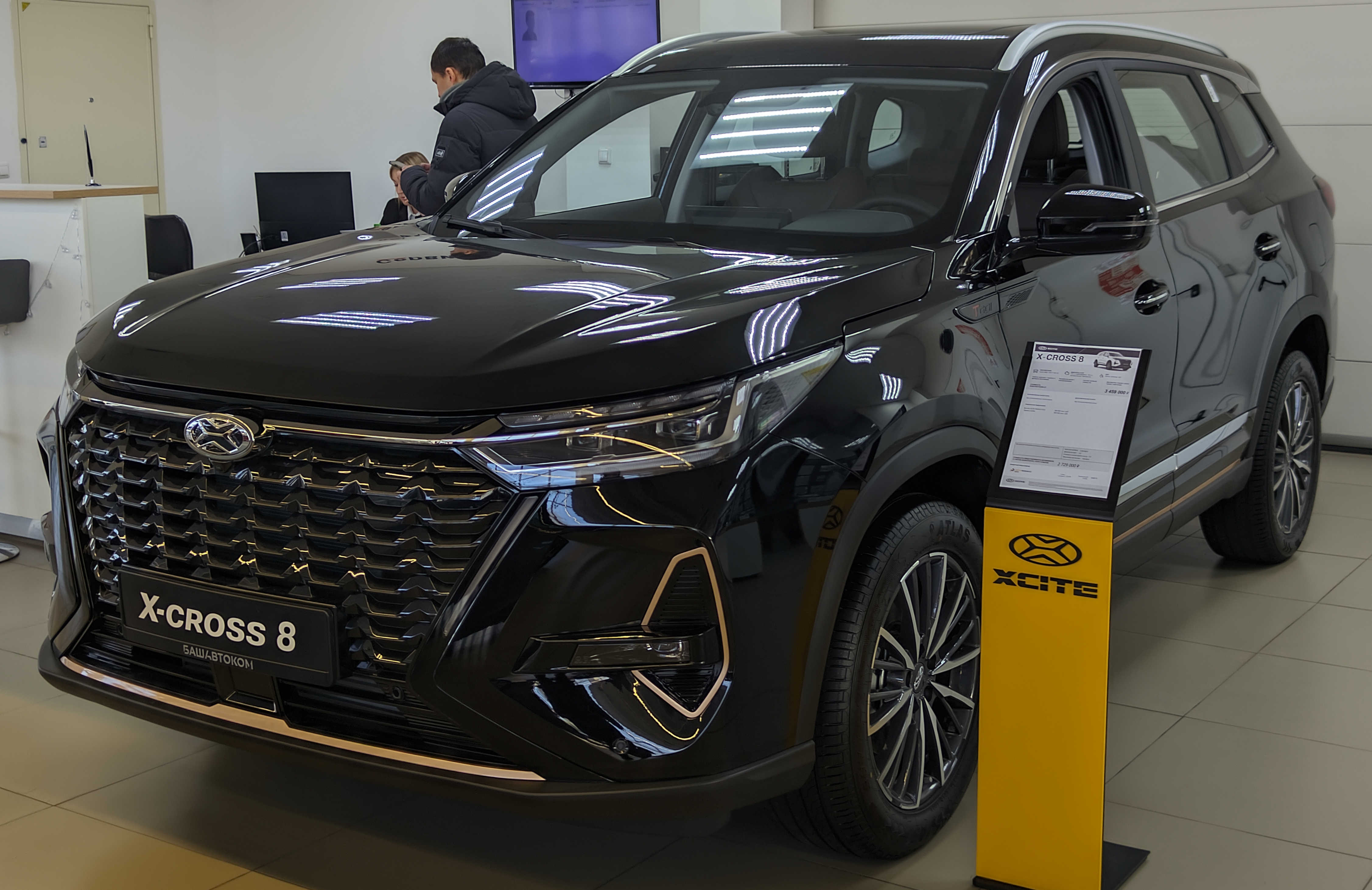
Xcite X-Cross 8 (Russia)

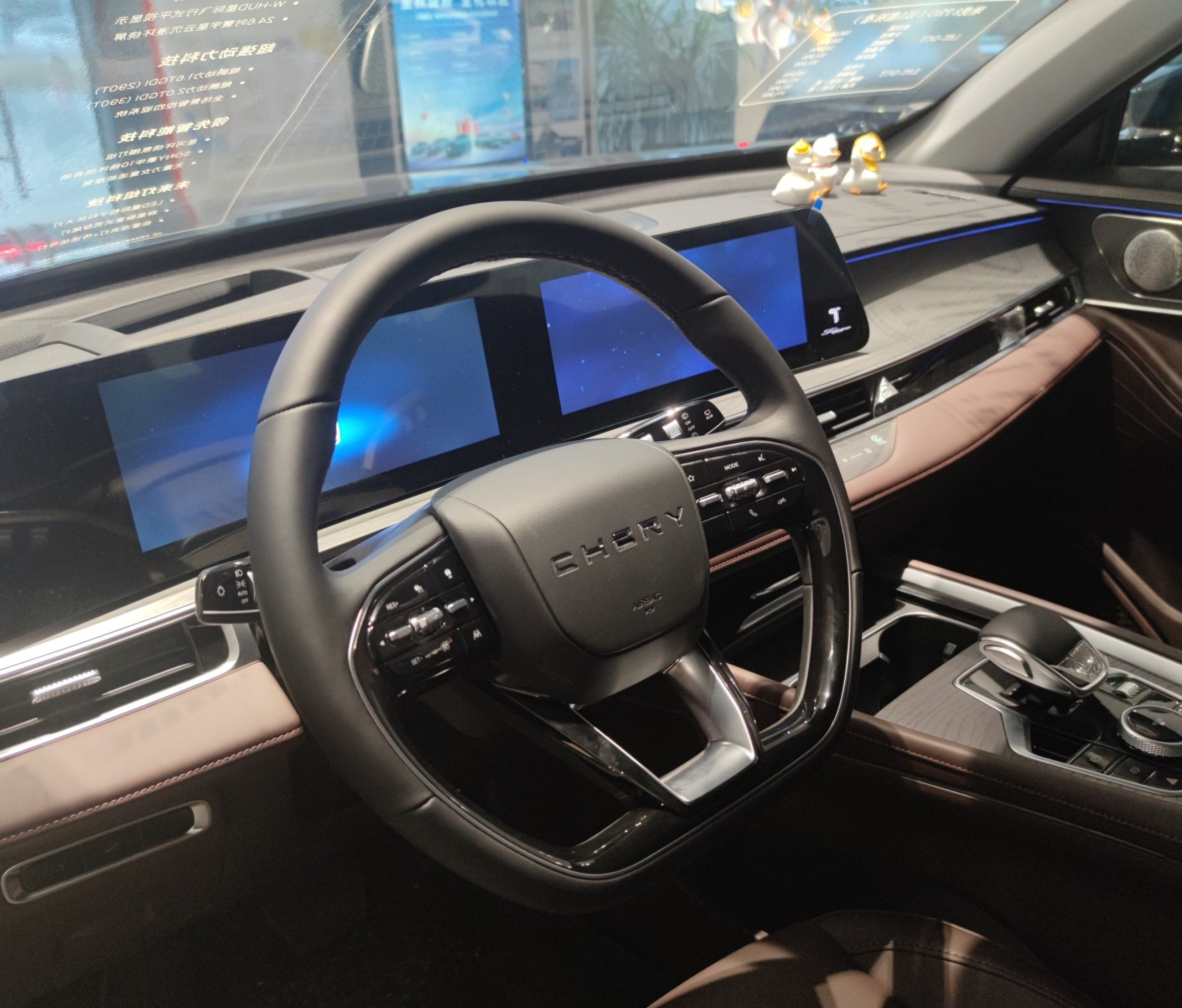
Interior

=== 2024 refresh ===
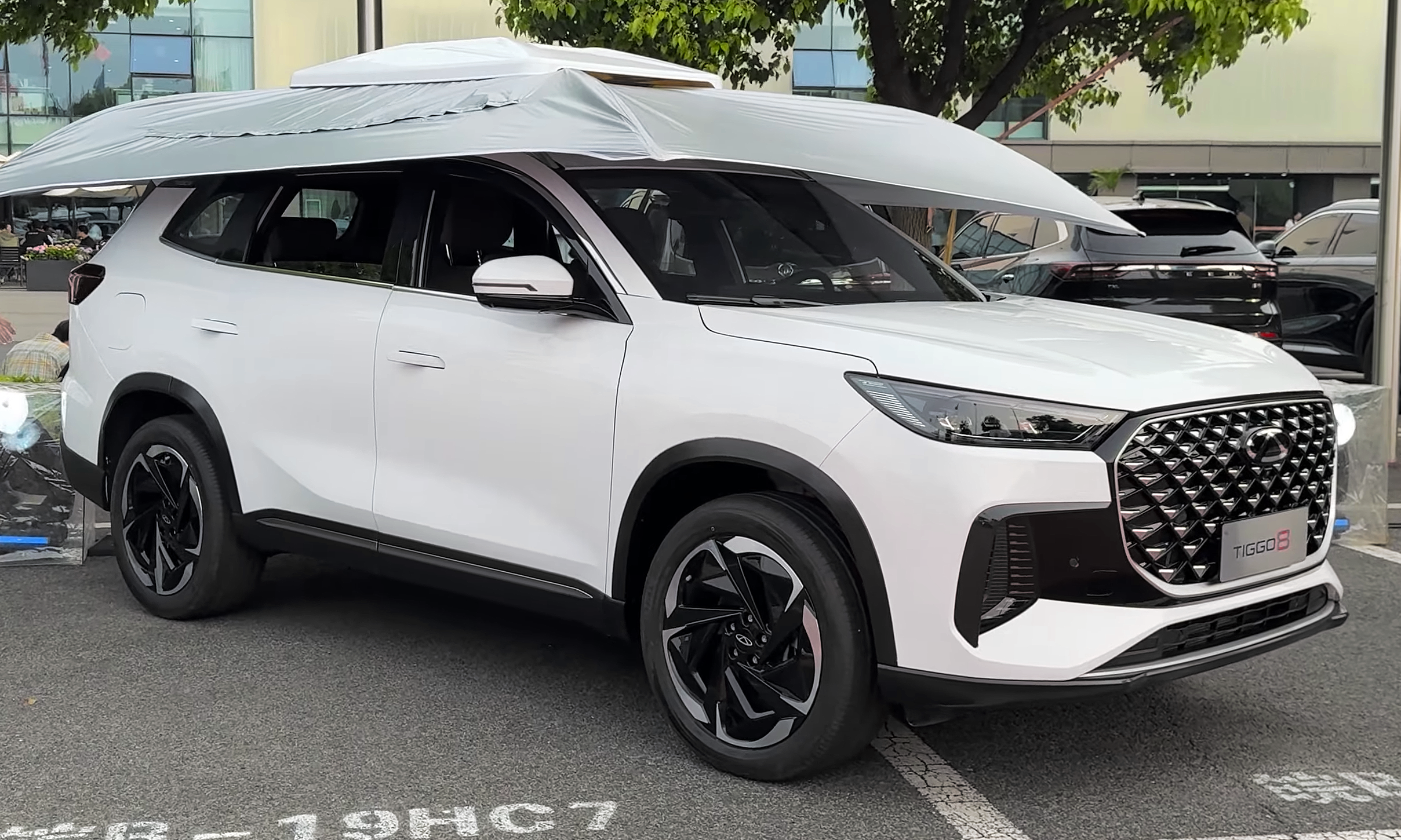
2024 Tiggo 8 (export version)

=== 2024 redesign (Chinese market Tiggo 8 Plus II/ Fulwin T8) ===
Chery Tiggo 8 Plus II
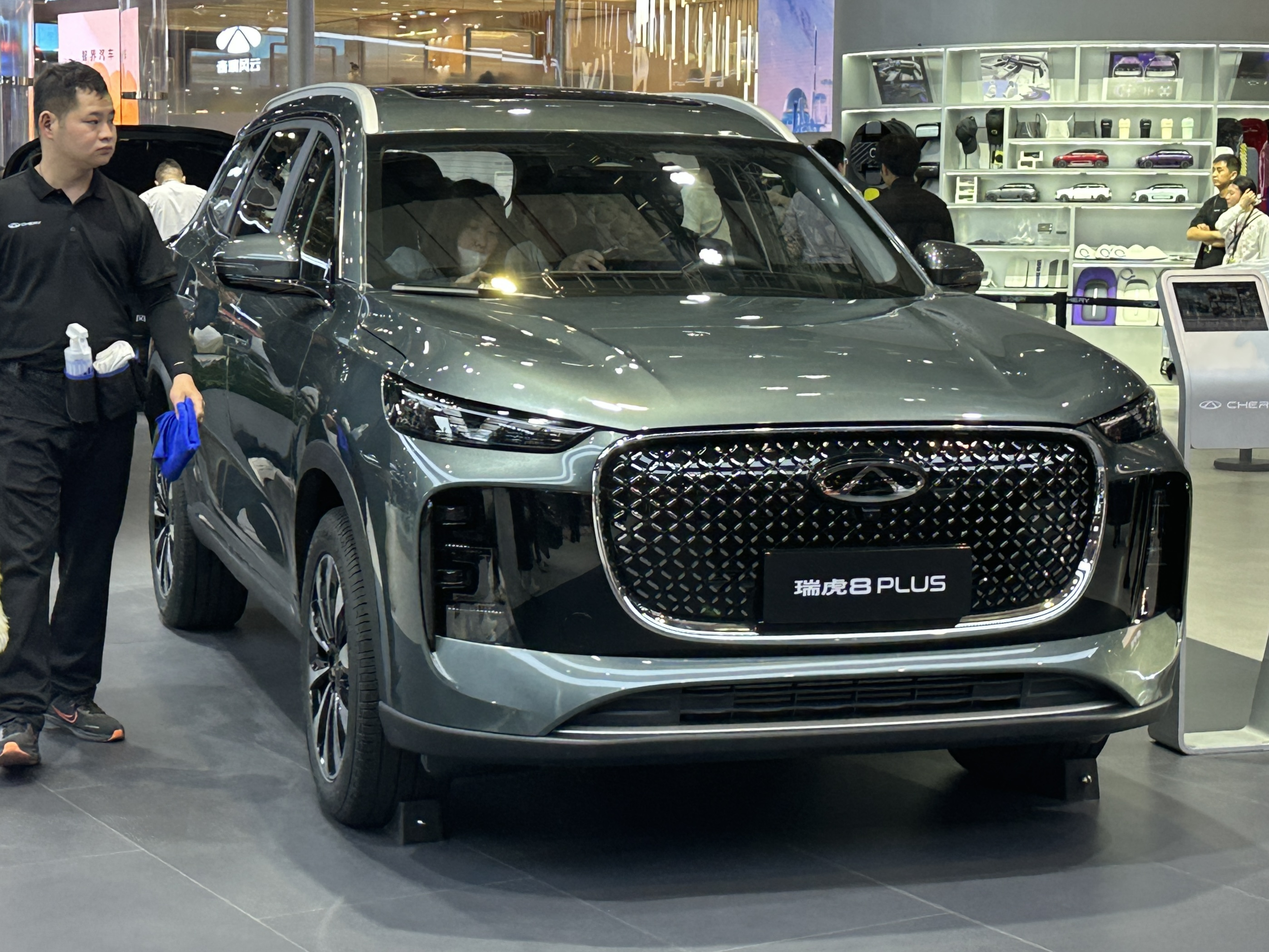
- Chery Tiggo 8 Plus II

Overview
- Model code: T18FL4
- Also called: Chery Tiggo 8 Pro; Chery Tiggo ReV (Philippines); Chery Fulwin T8; Tenet T8 (Russia, 2025–present); Chery Tiggo V (Export)
- Production: 2024–present
- Assembly: China: Wuhu, Anhui; Russia: Kaluga (AGR, Tenet T8)

Body and chassis
- Layout: Front-engine, front-wheel-drive or four-wheel-drive
- Platform: T1X

Powertrain
- Engine: Petrol: 1.6 L SQRF4J16C turbo I4; 1.6 L SQRF4J16 turbo I4; 2.0 L SQRF4J20 turbo I4; Petrol plug-in hybrid: 1.5 L SQRH4J15 turbo I4
- Electric motor: Permanent magnet synchronous (PHEV)
- Transmission: 7-speed dual-clutch; 8-speed CVT
- Hybrid drivetrain: Plug-in hybrid

Dimensions
- Wheelbase: 2,710 mm (106.7 in)
- Length: 4,722 mm (185.9 in) (Plus II); 4,730 mm (186.2 in) (Fulwin T8)
- Width: 1,860 mm (73.2 in)
- Height: 1,745 mm (68.7 in)

At the Beijing Auto Show in April 2024, Chery introduced the 2024 version of the Tiggo 8. Marketed as the New Tiggo 8 (later it was renamed as the All-New Tiggo 8 Plus), it received completely restyled front and rear fascia, new door panels with flush door handles, and a redesigned interior. At the 2024 Chery International Business Conference in Wuhu, Anhui, China in April 2024, Chery showcased an alternate export version with a revised front fascia which was later unveiled to be the base of the Fulwin T8 for the Chinese domestic market.

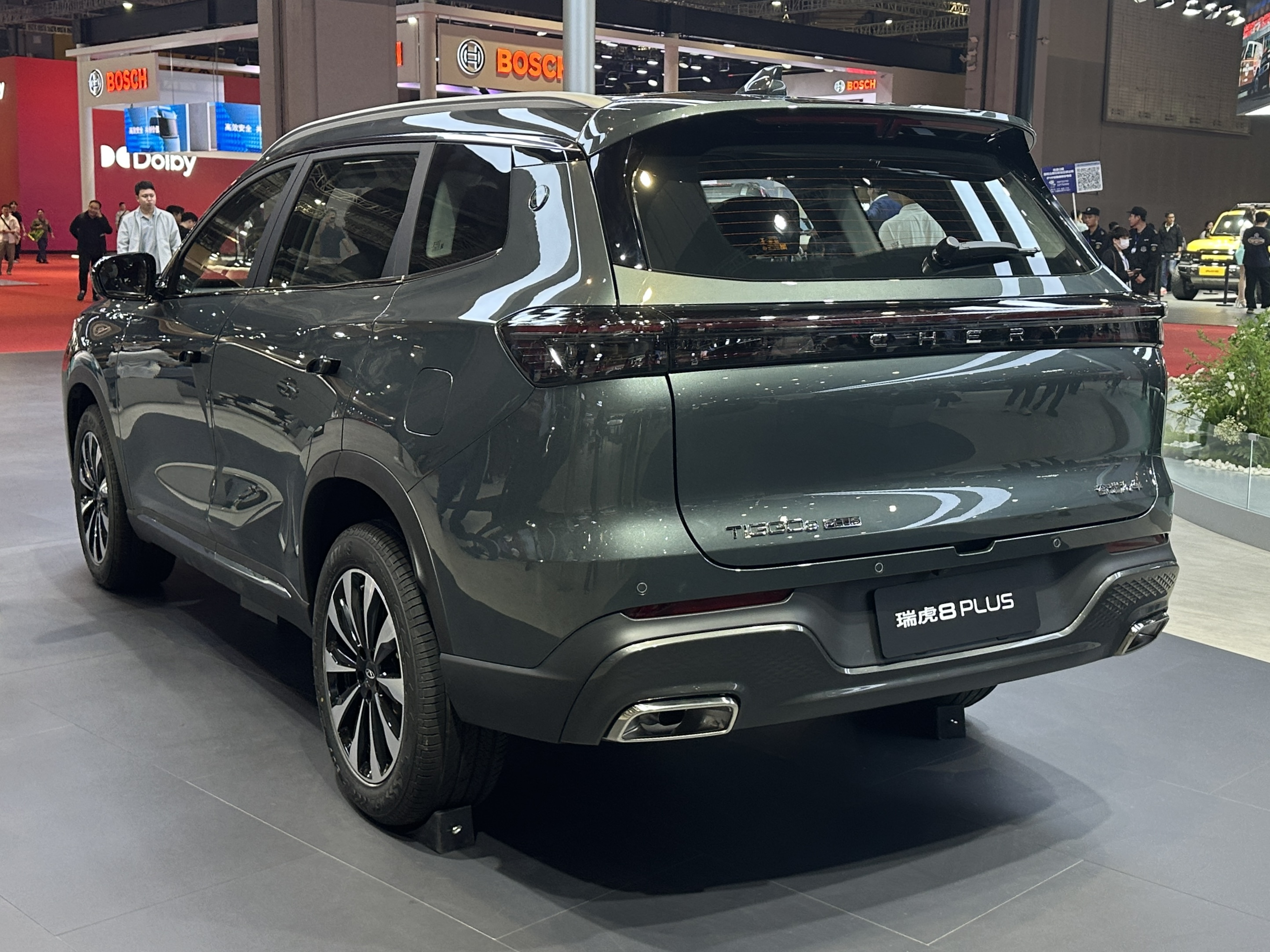
Rear view

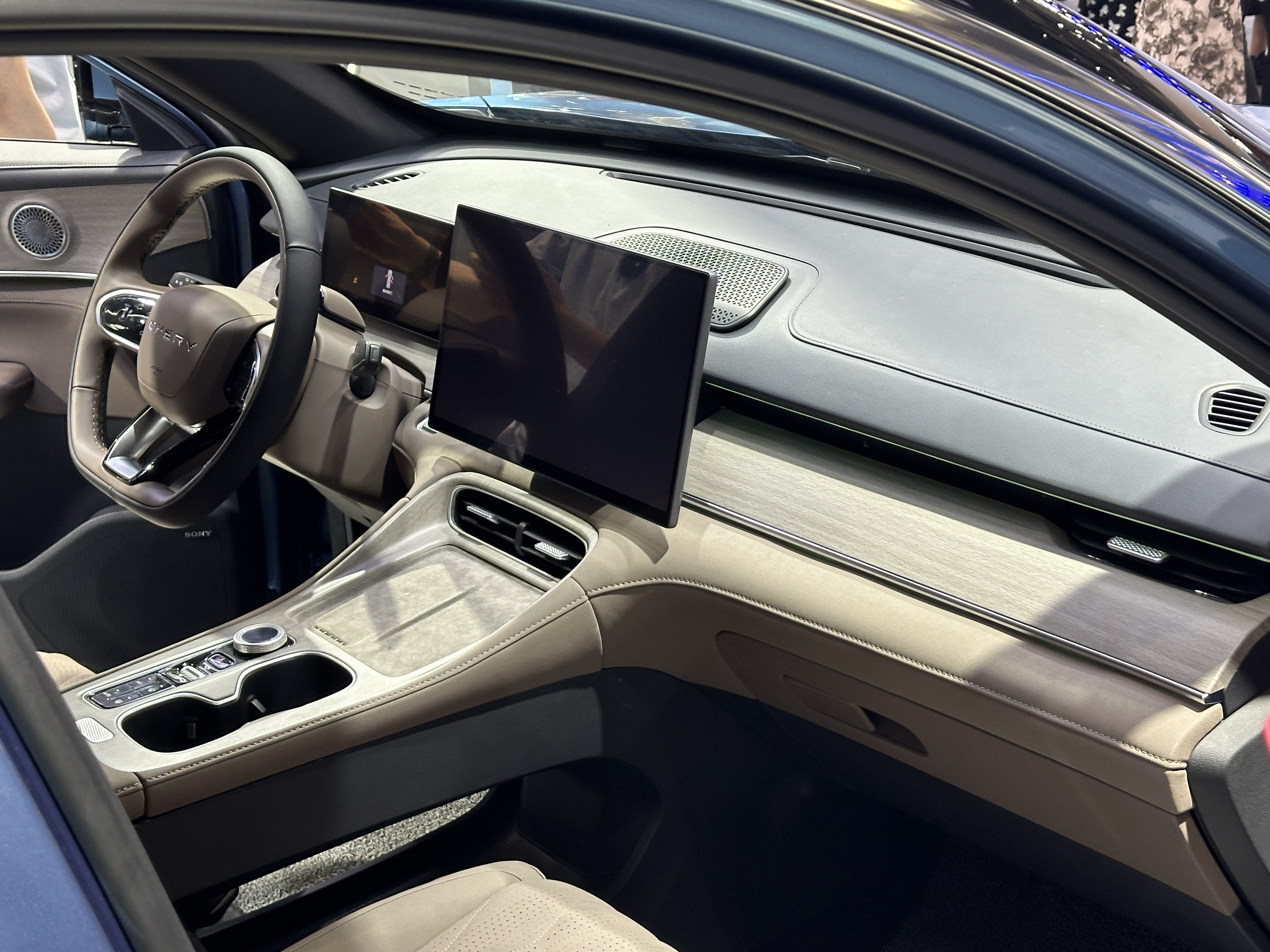
Interior

==== Fulwin T8 (2025) ====
The Chery Fulwin T8 was unveiled during Auto Guangzhou 2024 as the C-DM variant of the second generation Tiggo 8 Plus (New Tiggo 8) to be sold under the Fulwin NEV product series. In terms of styling, the Chery Fulwin T8 is heavily based on the export version of the second generation Tiggo 8 Plus. The Fulwin T8 is powered by the Kunpeng super-performance electric hybrid C-DM system is powered by a SQRH4J15 1.5-litre engine developing 154 hp (115 kW), and it is equipped with a 18.46 kWh or 18.66 kWh lithium iron phosphate battery pack capable of a pure electric range of 90 km. The declared comprehensive fuel consumption is 1.30L/100km, and the top speed is 175 km/h. Other features include a 207EBS anti-lock braking system supplied by Bosch. It went on sale in China in February 2025.

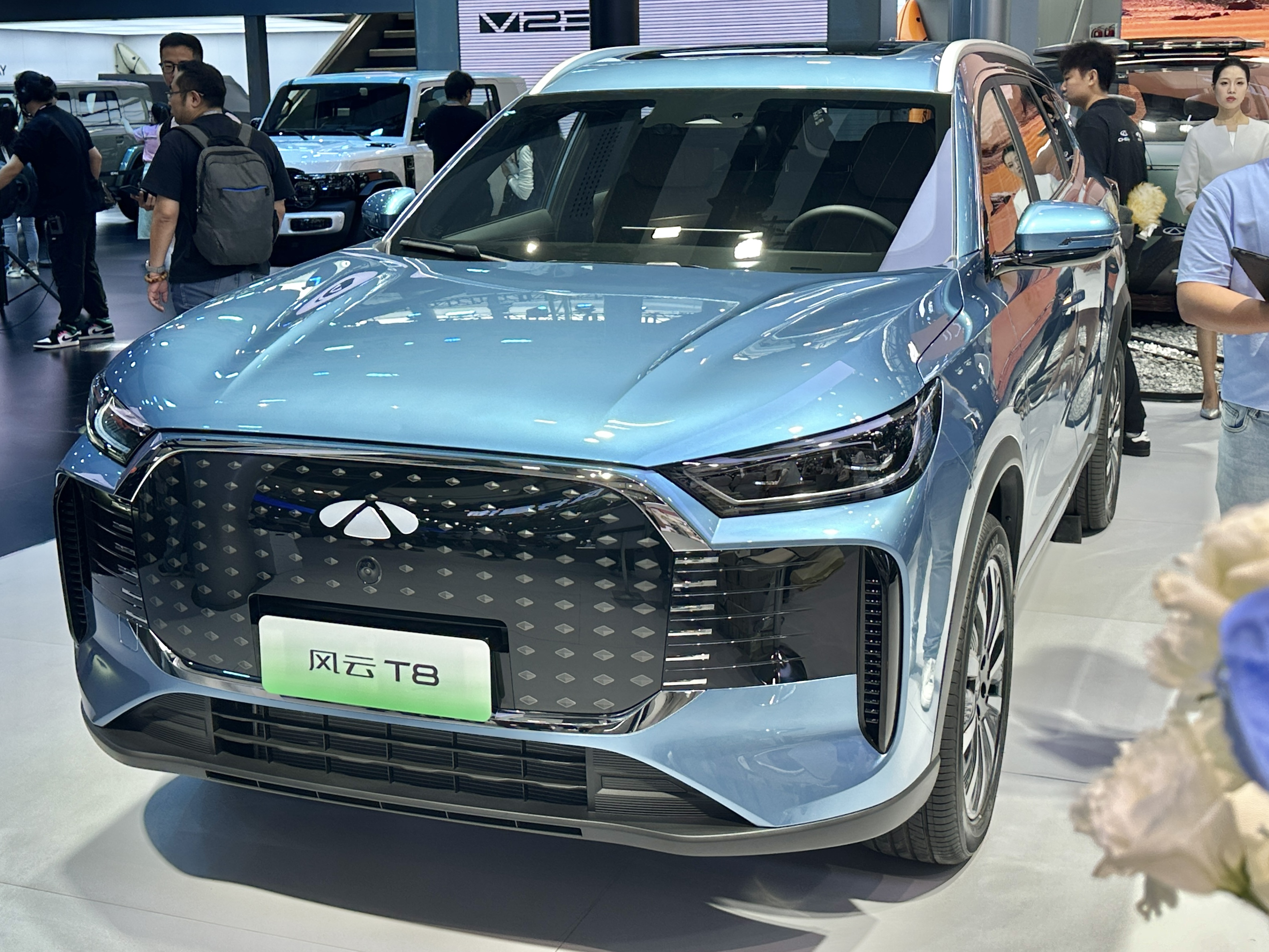
Chery Fulwin T8

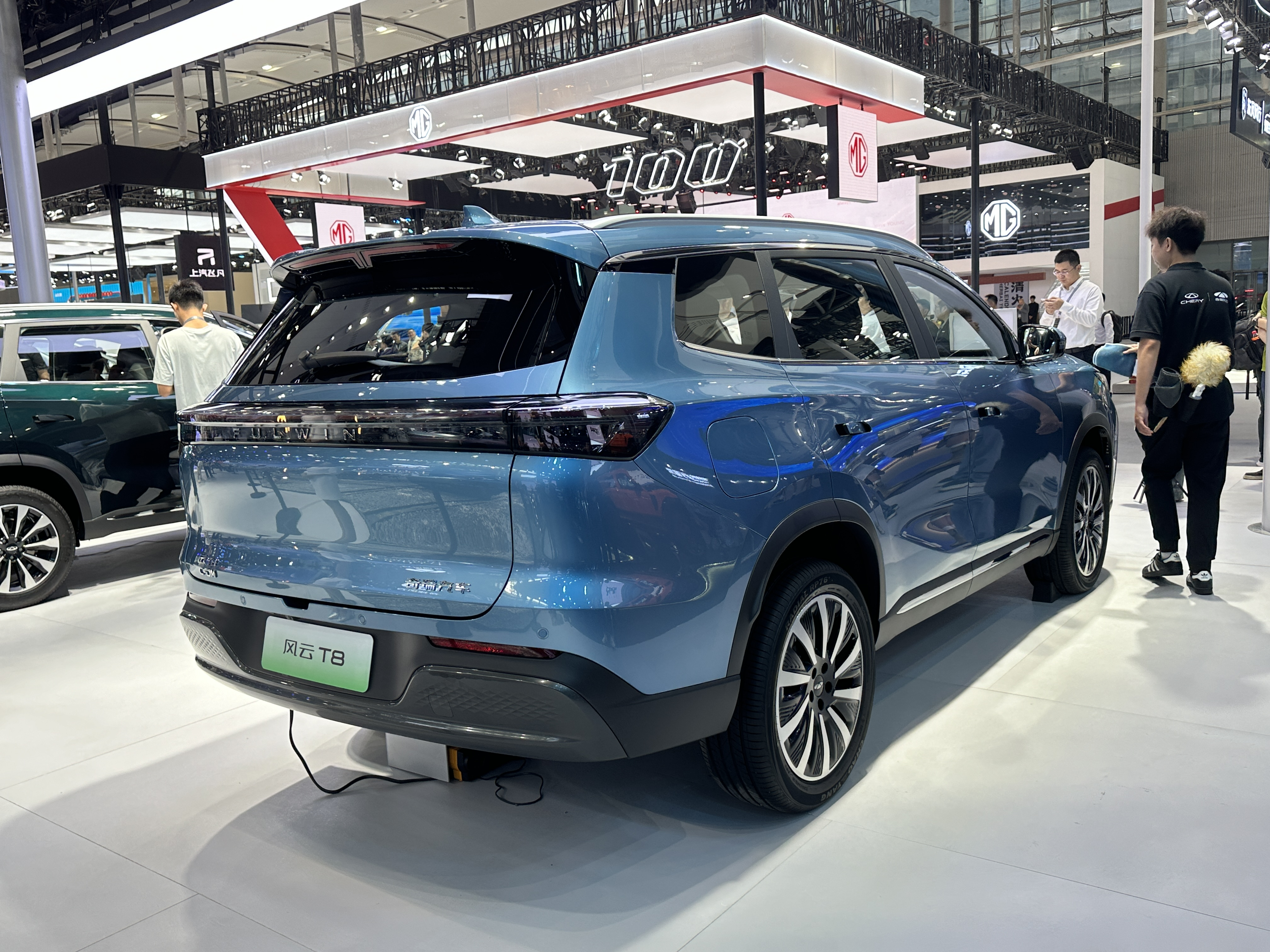
Chery Fulwin T8 rear view

=== Export markets ===
The Tiggo 8 is exported under different monikers such as Tiggo 8 Pro, Tiggo 8 Pro Max, or simply Tiggo 8, depending on the market and specifications.

==== Australia ====
The Tiggo 8 Pro Max was introduced in Australia in February 2024, with prices announced and sales commenced in May 2024. It is available in three grade levels: Urban, Elite and Ultimate. All models were powered by a 2.0-litre turbocharged petrol engine, mated with a 7-speed DCT. Front-wheel drive is standard on the Urban and Elite grades, while the Ultimate grade is exclusively standard with all-wheel drive.

In June 2025, the plug-in hybrid version with the 1.5-litre turbocharged petrol plug-in hybrid (PHEV) with front-wheel drive, marketed as the Super Hybrid went on sale in Australia with customer deliveries commenced in July 2025, the Super Hybrid version is available for the Urban and Ultimate grades.

==== Europe ====
The Tiggo 8 made its European market debut in July 2025 at the Goodwood Festival of Speed, it became the first Chery model to be marketed in the United Kingdom. In the European market, it is available with either a 1.6-litre turbocharged petrol or 1.5-litre turbocharged petrol plug-in hybrid, branded with the Super Hybrid name. The non-hybrid versions adopt the exterior styling from the Chinese market Tiggo 8 Plus II model, while the Super Hybrid versions adopts the exterior and interior styling from export market 2024 facelift model.

==== Spain ====
The Tiggo 8 is rebadged and sold in Spain by Ebro as the Ebro S800, following the company's partnership with Chery to assemble the latter's vehicles in Barcelona. It was unveiled at the Madrid Car Experience in May 2024. It adopts the styling used by the export-spec facelifted 2024 model.

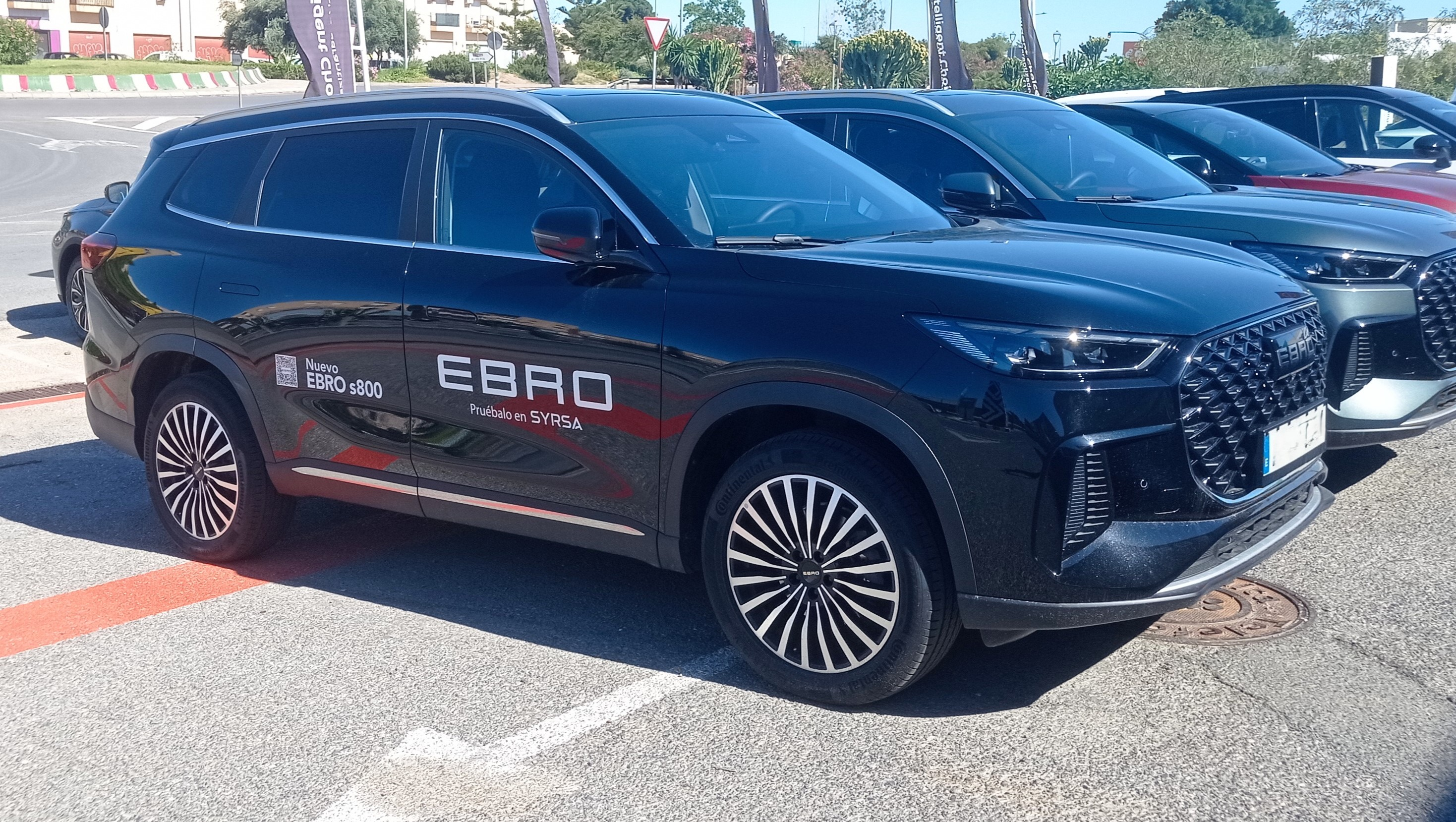
Ebro S800

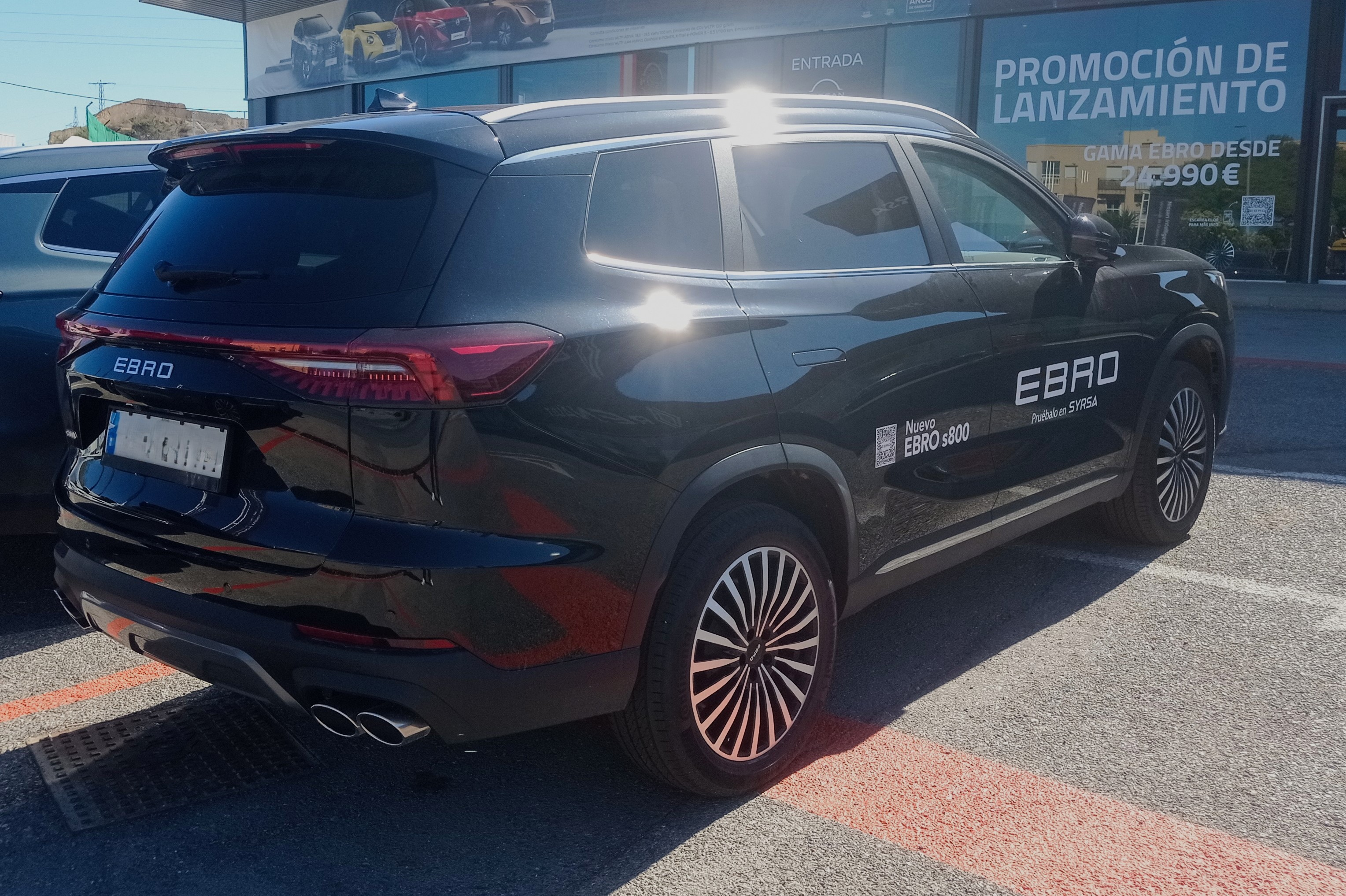
Rear view

==== Indonesia ====
The Tiggo 8 series was first introduced in Indonesia on 28 January 2022, initially with the Pro version. It was launched in 23 November 2022, alongside the Tiggo 7 Pro, as Chery's first models in the Indonesian market after a six-year absence. The Tiggo 8 Pro uses the 2.0-litre turbocharged petrol engine with front-wheel drive, and is offered with two variants: Luxury and Premium.

The upgraded Pro Max version was revealed in February 2024. Powered by the same engine option as the Pro model, it is available in either front-wheel drive or all-wheel drive. Pre-orders of the Pro Max models began in early July 2024.

The regular Tiggo 8 was introduced in 9 July 2024, serving as the series' entry-level model, and went on sale in 8 October 2024. Pre-orders began in 17 July 2024, with production commenced in September 2024. The regular Tiggo 8 uses the 1.6-litre turbocharged petrol engine with front-wheel drive, and is offered with two variants: Comfort and Premium.

The Tiggo 8 CSH plug-in hybrid version was first introduced in Indonesia in February 2025 at the 32nd Indonesia International Motor Show. It went on sale on 15 May 2025, in the sole variant, powered by the 1.5-litre turbocharged petrol plug-in hybrid and front-wheel drive. In November 2025, Comfort FWD and Premium AWD variants for the Tiggo 8 CSH were introduced, while the sole unnamed variant previously available became the mid-range Premium variant.

All models are locally assembled at the Handal Indonesia Motor assembly facility in Bekasi, West Java.

==== Malaysia ====
The Tiggo 8 Pro was first introduced in Malaysia in October 2022, coinciding with Chery's return to the Malaysian market after a 7-year absence. It was launched alongside the Omoda 5 in July 2023 as the brand's first models in the country. Powered by the 2.0-litre turbocharged petrol engine and front-wheel drive, it is only available in a sole variant: Premium.

The Tiggo 8 CSH plug-in hybrid version with the 1.5-litre turbocharged petrol plug-in hybrid (PHEV) with front-wheel drive, was launched in Malaysia on 3 October 2025 in the sole variant.

The regular Tiggo 8 was introduced in Malaysia in January 2026, uses the 1.6-litre turbocharged petrol engine with front-wheel drive. Compared to the Tiggo 8 Pro, the regular Tiggo 8 features a differentiated rear fascia and interior designs.

All models are locally assembled at Inokom's facility in Kulim, Kedah.

==== Mexico ====
The Tiggo 8 Pro is sold in Mexico as the Chirey Tiggo 8 Pro Max. It was launched in July 2022, alongside the Tiggo 7 Pro. At launch, it is available in two trim levels: Luxury and Premium. All models were powered by the 1.5-litre turbocharged petrol engine, with front-wheel drive is standard on the former trim, while all-wheel drive is standard on the latter.

The plug-in hybrid model, the Tiggo 8 Pro e+, powered by the 1.5-litre turbocharged petrol plug-in hybrid (PHEV), was added in July 2023. In October 2025, the plug-in hybrid model was updated to be equipped with Chery Super Hybrid (CSH) technology, and the CSH version is available in the sole variant.

==== Pakistan ====
The Tiggo 8 Pro was launched alongside the Tiggo 4 Pro in Pakistan in March 2022. It is locally assembled under license at Ghandhara Nissan's facility in Karachi. Production commenced on 31 March 2022.

==== Philippines ====
The Tiggo 8 was launched in the Philippines in November 2019 alongside the Tiggo 2, Tiggo 5x and Tiggo 7, marking Chery's return to the Philippine market. It is available in two variant levels: Luxury and Luxury EX. Both models were powered by the 1.5-litre turbocharged petrol engine.

The Tiggo 8 Pro was launched at the 17th Manila International Auto Show in April 2022, replacing the Tiggo 8. It is available in two engine options; a 1.6-litre turbocharged petrol and a 1.5-litre turbocharged petrol plug-in hybrid (PHEV). The plug-in hybrid version received a new variant, marketed as the Tiggo 8 Pro e+, in March 2023.

The Tiggo Grand Tour was launched in the Philippines in April 2025 at the 20th Manila International Auto Show. The Tiggo Grand Tour is marketed as a multi-purpose vehicle (MPV) in the Philippines and it is available in the sole variant powered by the 1.5-litre turbocharged petrol paired with a CVT. Alongside the Tiggo Grand Tour, the Tiggo ReV C-DM plug-in hybrid version, based on the Chinese market Tiggo 8 Plus II, was also launched in the Philippines at the same event in the sole Luxury Edition (LE) variant.

==== Russia ====
The Tiggo 8 was launched in Russia in May 2020, following delays due to the COVID-19 pandemic in Russia. It is available with the 1.5-litre turbocharged petrol engine.

The Tiggo 8 Pro was launched in March 2021, positioned above the regular Tiggo 8. The Pro model is initially available in a sole variant: Prestige. It is powered by either a 2.0-litre or a 1.6-litre turbocharged petrol engine, the latter engine option is only available in two optional packages for the base variant; Speedline and Dreamline. The Ultimate variant was added in December 2021. It was discontinued in April 2024.

The Pro Max model, powered by a 2.0-litre turbocharged petrol engine with standard all-wheel-drive, was launched on 22 April 2022. It is available in two variant levels: Dreamline and Ultimate. The Tiggo 8 Pro Max received a facelift on 30 August 2023.

The plug-in hybrid model, the Tiggo 8 Pro e+, powered by the 1.5-litre turbocharged petrol plug-in hybrid (PHEV), was launched alongside the plug-in hybrid version of the Tiggo 7 Pro in October 2023.

From 2025, the model was rebaged as the Tenet T8 by Tenet in Russia.

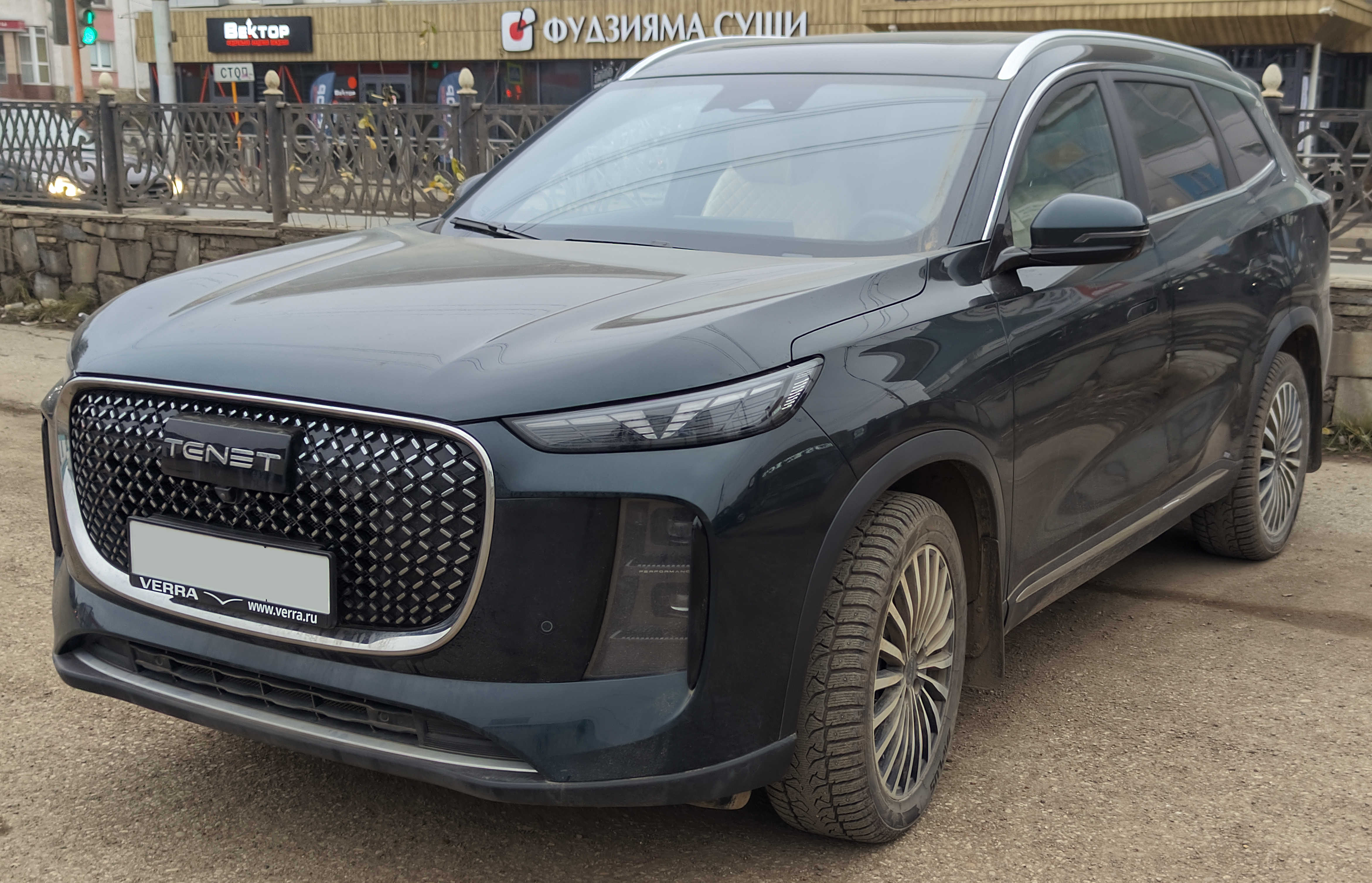
Tenet T8 (Russia)

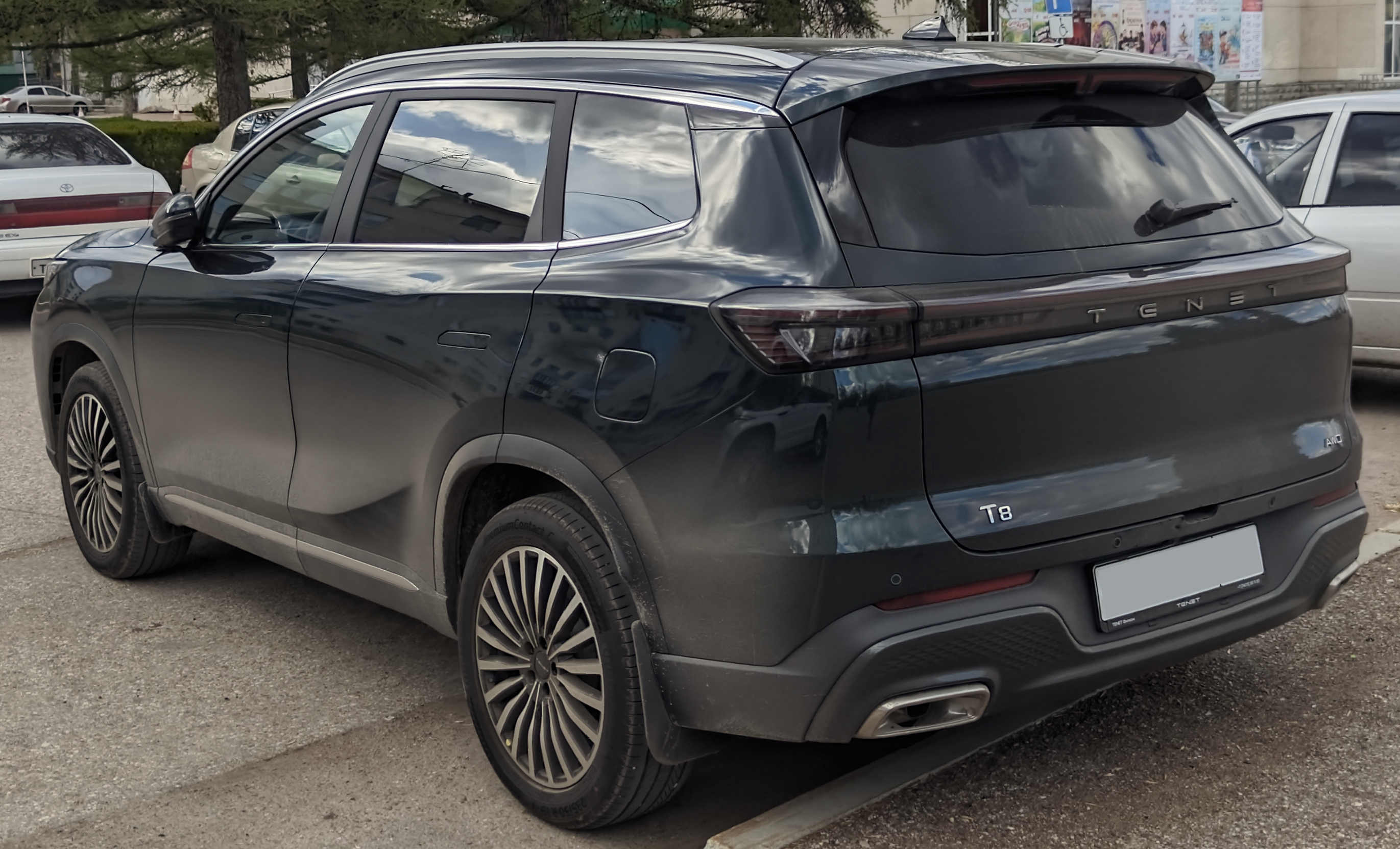
Tenet T8 rear

==== South Africa ====
The Tiggo 8 Pro was launched in South Africa in February 2022. It is available in two variant levels: Distinctive and Executive. Both models were powered by the 1.6-litre turbocharged petrol engine.

The Pro Max model, powered by the 2.0-litre turbocharged petrol engine, was launched in December 2022 to commemorate Chery South Africa's first anniversary.

Both Tiggo 8 Pro and Tiggo 8 Pro Max received facelifts in August 2023. For the facelift, the Distinctive variant on the Pro model was dropped from the lineup. An all-wheel drive option was added in the Pro Max model in March 2024. The entry-level Executive+ variant was added for the Pro model in December 2024.

The Tiggo 8 CSH plug-in hybrid version with the 1.5-litre turbocharged petrol plug-in hybrid (PHEV) with front-wheel drive, was launched in South Africa on 11 August 2025 and the CSH version is available for the new Apex variant.

The LS trim was introduced for the Pro model in August 2026 to replace the Executive+ trim and served as the new entry-level variant.

The Tiggo 8 was introduced in South Africa in September 2026, in the sole Apex I trim powered by the 1.5-litre turbocharged petrol engine.

==== Thailand ====
The Tiggo 8 CSH was launched in Thailand on 20 January 2026, with two variants: 2WD Esteem and 4WD Elite, both variants are powered by the 1.5-litre turbocharged petrol plug-in hybrid (PHEV).

=== Motorsport ===
In 2024, the Tiggo 8 participated in the Taklimakan Rally on the T2 Production Vehicle class.

=== Safety ===
==== ANCAP ====
ANCAP test results Chery Tiggo 8 Pro Max (2023, aligned with Euro NCAP)
Test	Points	%
Overall:	5 /5 stars	
Adult occupant:	35.34	88%
Child occupant:	42.74	87%
Pedestrian:	50.30	79%
Safety assist:	15.54	86%

ANCAP test results Chery Tiggo 8 (2025, aligned with Euro NCAP)
Test	Points	%
Overall:	5 /5 stars	
Adult occupant:	33.17	82%
Child occupant:	42.23	86%
Pedestrian:	50.60	80%
Safety assist:	14.79	82%

==== Euro NCAP ====
Euro NCAP test results Chery Tiggo 7 PHEV (LHD) (2025)
Test	Points	%
Overall:	4 /5 stars	
Adult occupant:	32.4	81%
Child occupant:	37.8	77%
Pedestrian:	50.6	80%
Safety assist:	14.2	78%

Euro NCAP test results Chery Tiggo 7 PHEV (LHD) (2025)
Test	Points	%
Overall:	5 /5 stars	
Adult occupant:	33.0	82%
Child occupant:	41.8	85%
Pedestrian:	50.6	80%
Safety assist:	14.2	78%

== Second generation (2025) ==
Second generation
- Chery Tiggo 8 II Leopard variant

Overview
- Model code: T1G
- Also called: Chery Fulwin T8; Lepas L8
- Production: 2025–present
- Assembly: China: Wuhu, Anhui; Indonesia: Bekasi, West Java (HIM, Lepas L8)

Body and chassis
- Layout: Front-engine, front-wheel-drive
- Platform: T1X
- Related: Chery Tiggo 9X; Omoda C7

Powertrain
- Engine: Petrol: 1.6 L SQRF4J16 turbo I4; 2.0 L SQRF4J20 turbo I4; Petrol plug-in hybrid: 1.5 L SQRH4J15 turbo I4
- Electric motor: Permanent magnet synchronous (PHEV)
- Transmission: 7-speed dual-clutch; 8-speed automatic; DHT (PHEV)
- Hybrid drivetrain: Plug-in hybrid

Dimensions
- Wheelbase: 2,800–2,825 mm (110.2–111.2 in)
- Length: 4,749 mm (187.0 in); 4,731 mm (186.3 in) (Fulwin T8L); 4,670 mm (183.9 in) (Lepas L8)
- Width: 1,871–1,880 mm (73.7–74.0 in)
- Height: 1,694–1,747 mm (66.7–68.8 in)

The new generation of the Tiggo 8 was announced at an event in China on 27 September 2025. The similar vehicle was previously introduced in April 2025 for export markets as the Lepas L8, as the first model from the export-only Lepas marque. Its plug-in hybrid version will be marketed as the Chery Fulwin T8 in China.

In China, the model is marketed as the "fifth-generation" Tiggo 8 while being positioned as a two-row, five-seater model with two different front fascia design options named the Tiger Variant and Leopard Variant.

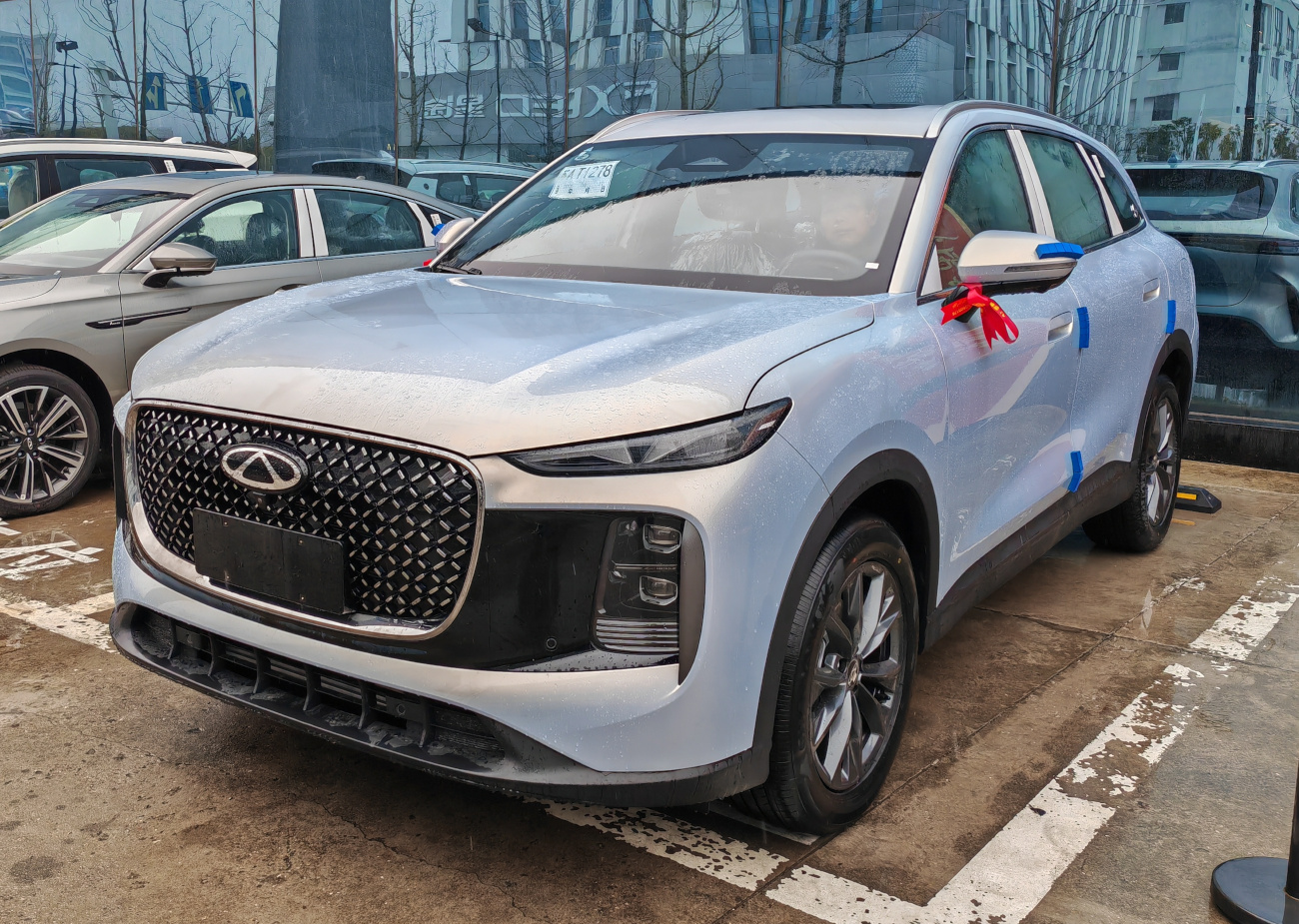
Tiggo 8 II Leopard Variant

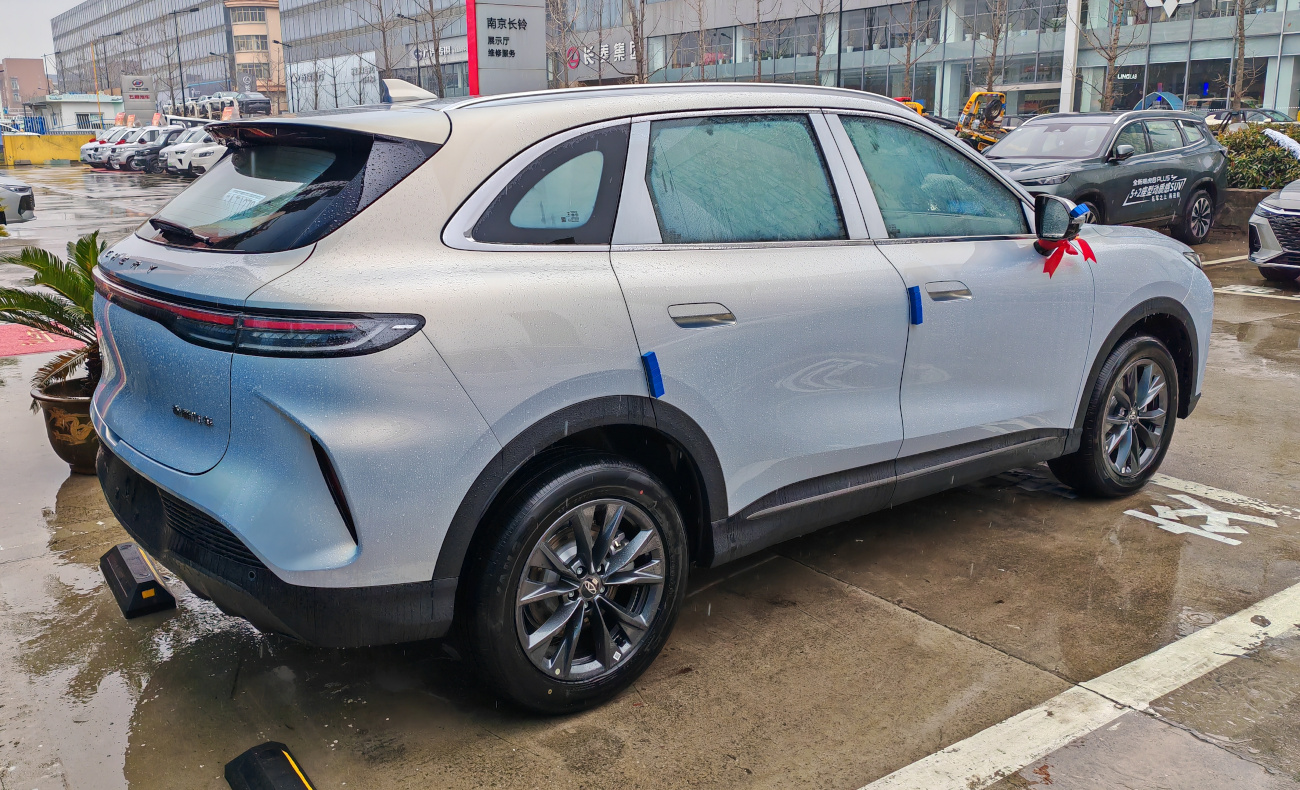
Rear view

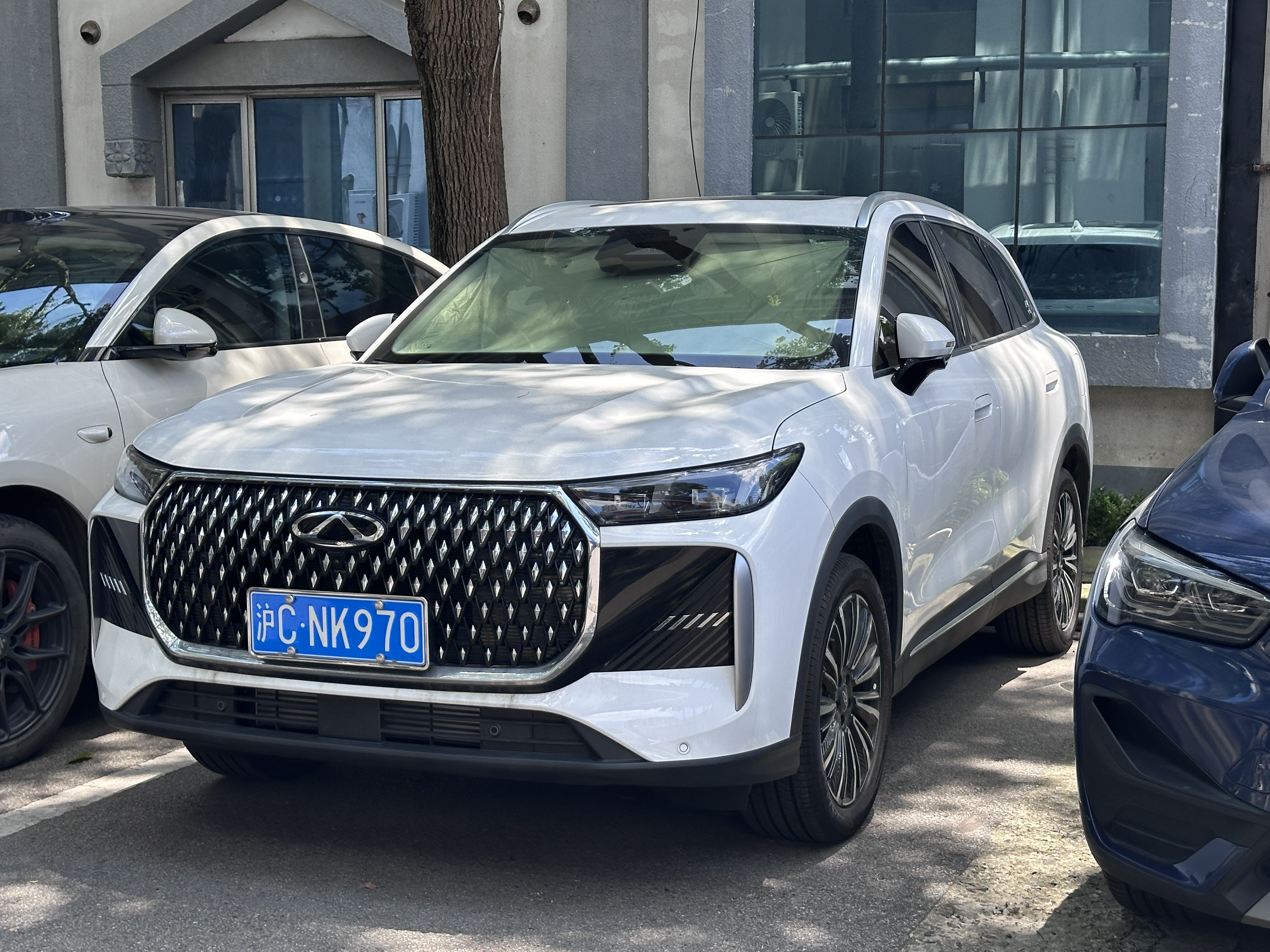
Tiggo 8 II Tiger Variant

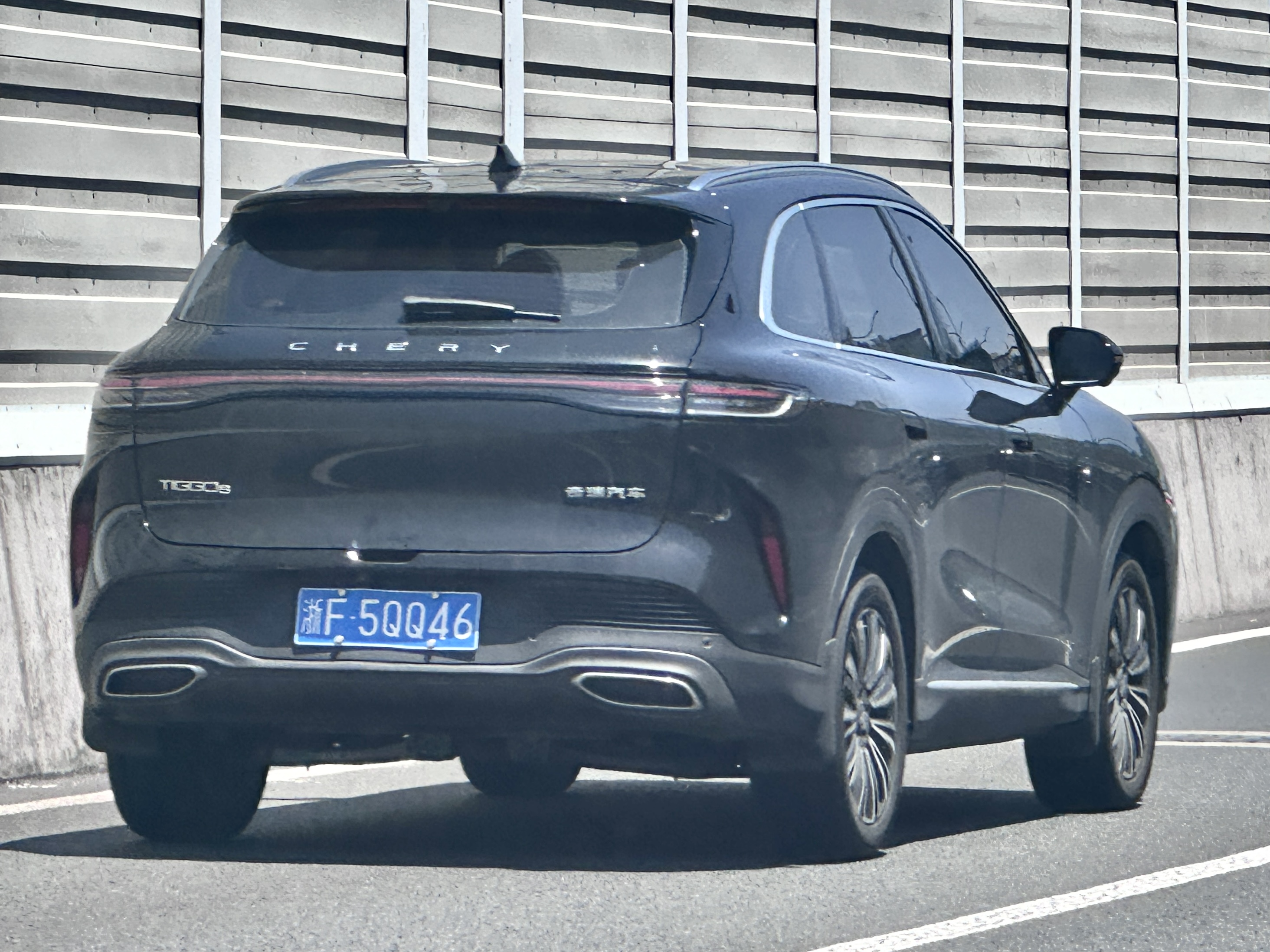
Rear view

=== Lepas L8 ===
The first production Lepas L8 rolled off the production line in April 2025, ahead of its sales in global markets.

==== Markets ====
===== Indonesia =====
The L8 made its first overseas debut in July 2025 at the 32nd Gaikindo Indonesia International Auto Show. It was launched in Indonesia on 27 July 2026, in the sole PHEV variant.

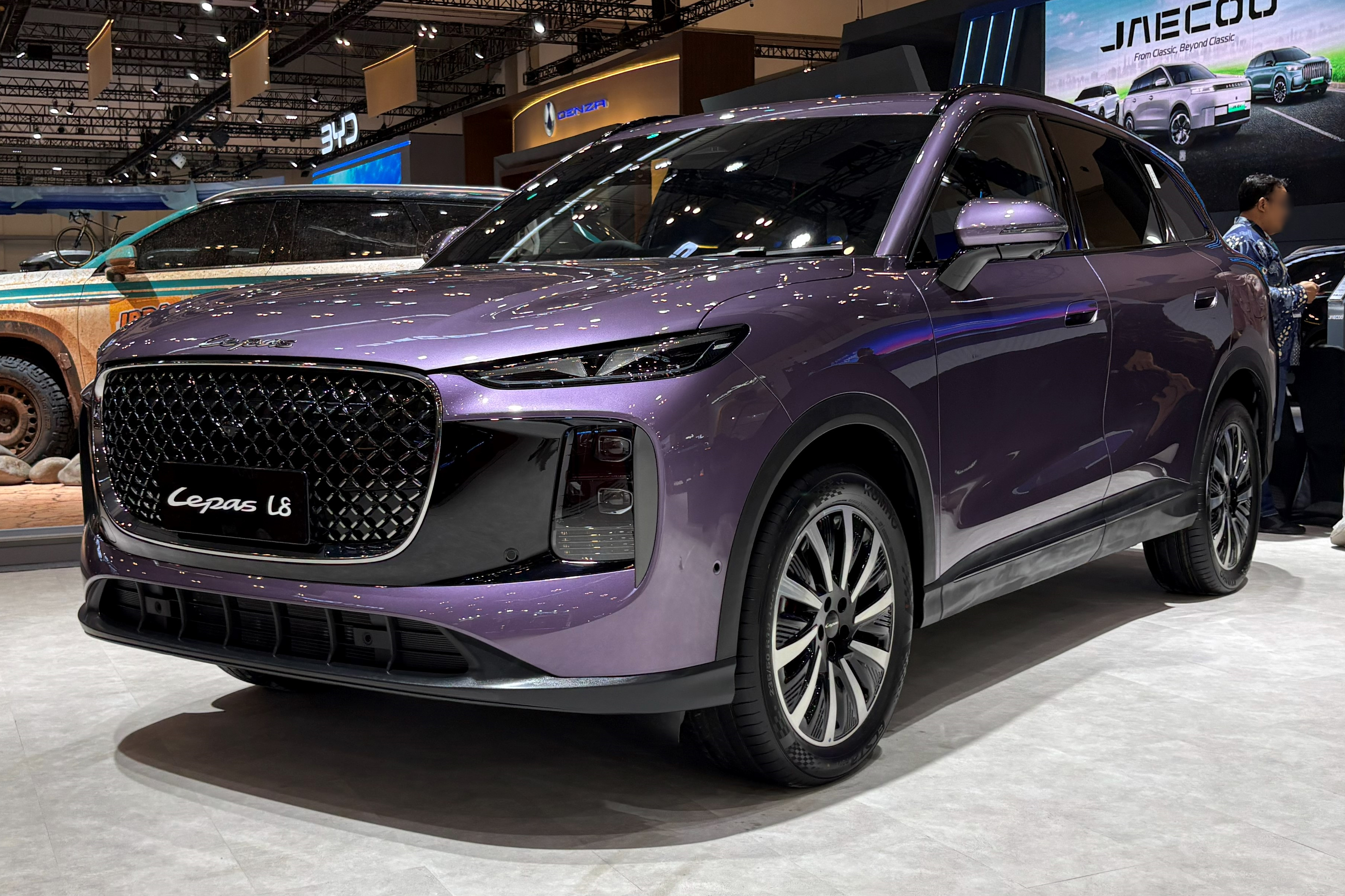
Lepas L8 PHEV

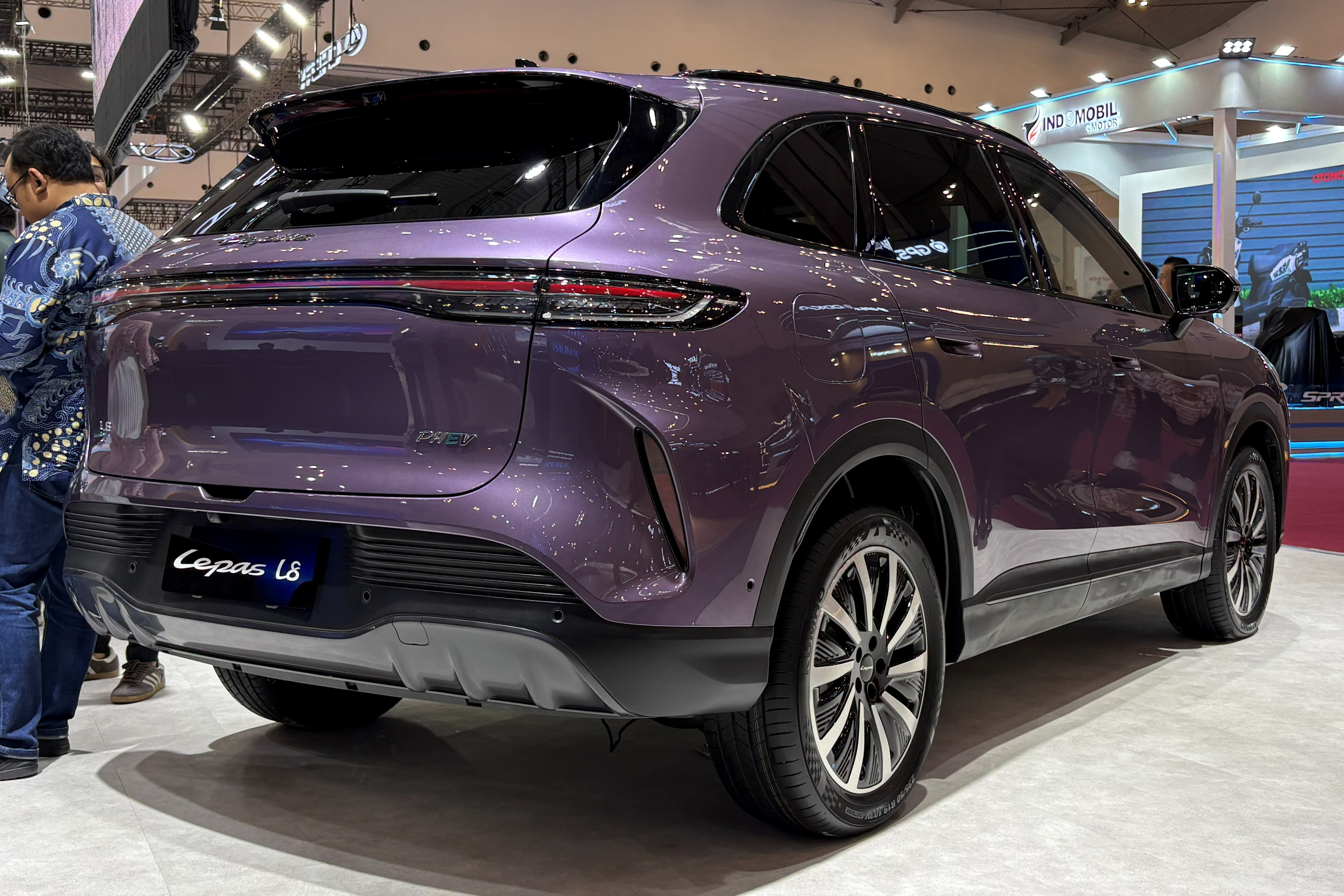
Rear view

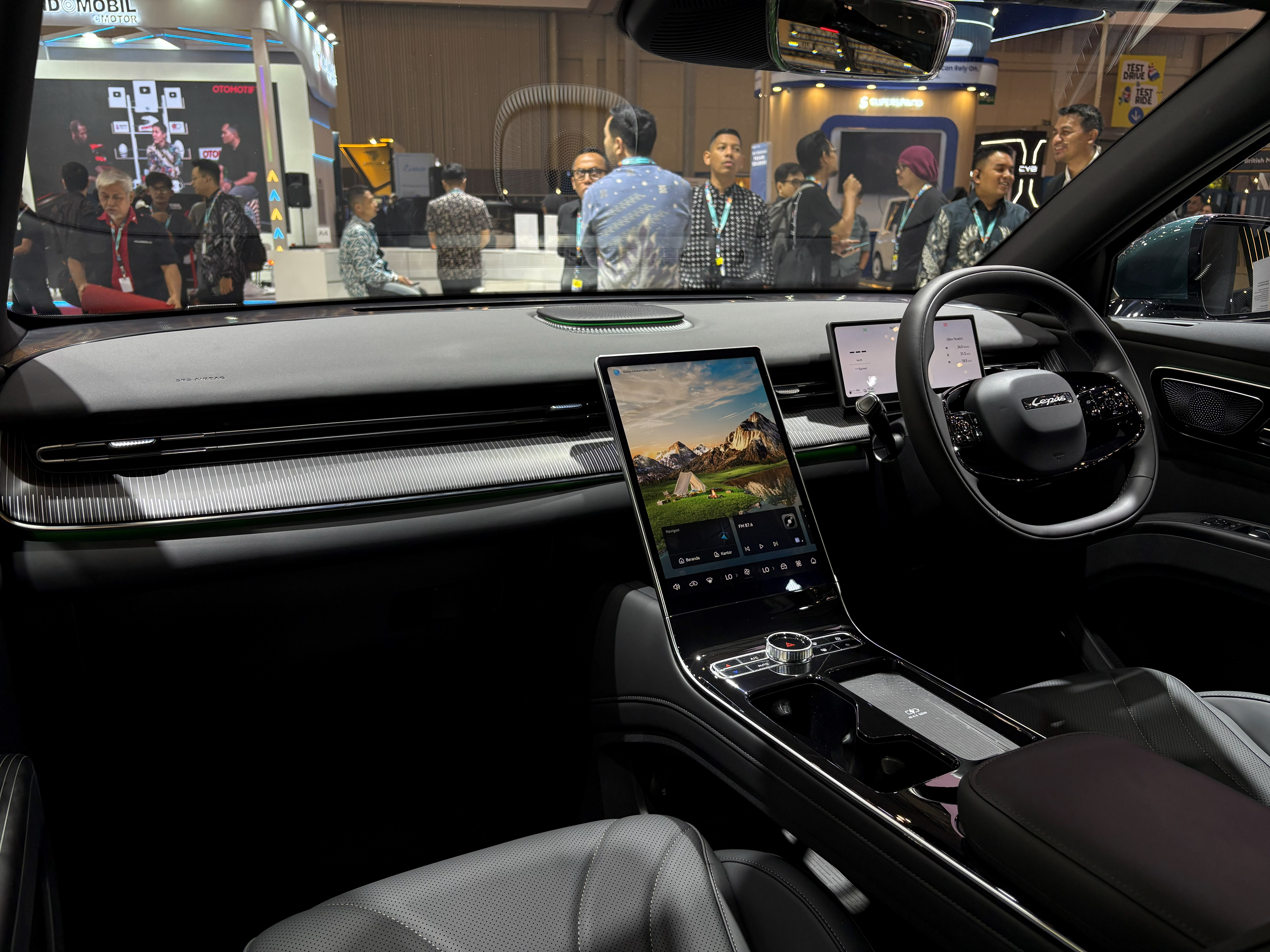
Interior

== Sales ==
Year	China					Russia	Brazil	Mexico		Turkey	Indonesia				Total production
Year	Tiggo 8	Tiggo 8 Plus	Tiggo 8 Pro	Tiggo 8L	Fulwin T8	Russia	Brazil	Tiggo 8	Tiggo 8 Pro e+	Turkey	Tiggo 8	Tiggo 8 Pro	Tiggo 8 Pro Max	Tiggo 8 CSH	Total production
2018															50,553
2019															116,494
2020						2,064	1,620								136,182
2021						8,967	10,454								160,937
2022	120,506					10,018	10,441	1,607							180,450
2023	26,306	20,864	79,992			22,400	9,545	3,736		14,499		538			232,978
2024	68,620	24,643	87,348	16,469			9,750	1,281	241	22,875	1,246	49	181		314,397
2025	41,762	40,507	65,703	39,319	13,616		17,884	446	60		2,078	27	54	3,370	
