= Southern Metropolis Daily =

Daily newspaper in Guangzhou city, China

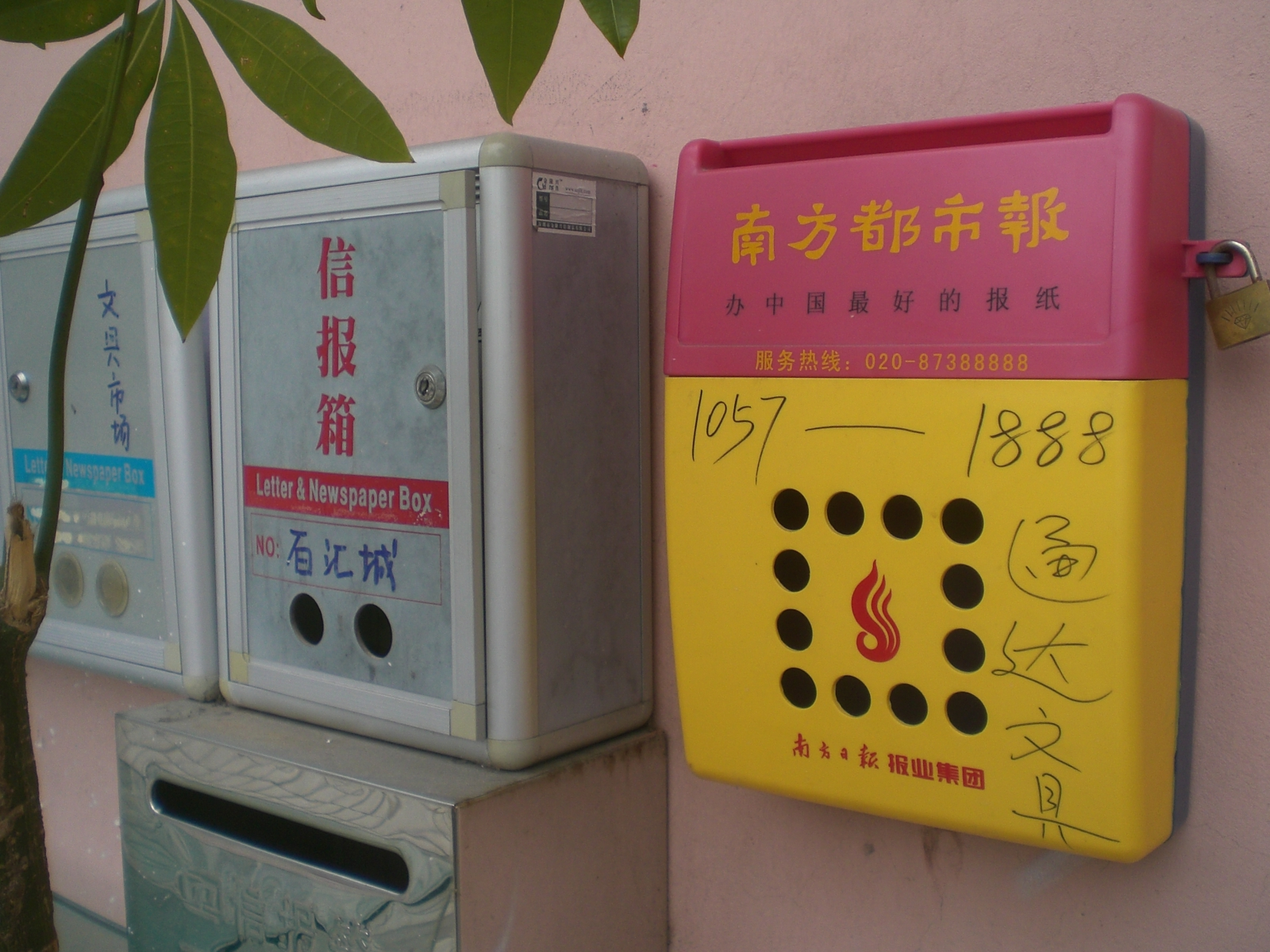
- A Southern Metropolis Daily newspaper box in Shenzhen, China
- Native name: 南方都市报
- Type: Daily newspaper
- Format: Tabloid
- Owner: Guangdong Provincial Committee of the Chinese Communist Party
- Editor: Liu Chen
- Founded: 1997
- Political alignment: Chinese Communist Party
- Language: Chinese (Simplified)
- Headquarters: Guangzhou, China
- Circulation: 1,690,000 (March 2012)
- ISSN: 1004-5171
- OCLC number: 144518464
- Website: www.oeeee.com

Southern Metropolis Daily (SMD) is a newspaper based in Guangzhou, China, and circulated mainly in the Pearl River Delta region. It is a constituent of the Nanfang Media Group, which is under the control of the Guangdong Provincial Committee of the Chinese Communist Party (CCP). The newspaper publishes on weekdays and is known for its boundary-pushing investigative reporting, most notably the Sun Zhigang incident. On March 1, 2006, it launched its weekend edition under a dual system: Southern Metropolis Entertainment Weekly every Monday and Southern Metropolis Weekly every Friday.

== History ==
=== Origins ===
Southern Metropolis Daily (SMD) was first created in 1995. It is located in the Guangzhou City of the greater Guangdong and Pearl River Delta area. It was first established as a weekly newspaper under the name Southern weekly. It was created as a constituent branch of the Nanfang media group, all of which are a part of the Southern Media Group. The name Southern Metropolis was extended to Southern Metropolis Daily in 1997 by The Nanfang Media Group, by which it was also established as a tabloid media form. SMD competes with other daily newspapers in the Guangdong region; including but not limited to Information Times, Southern Weekly, Yangcheng Evening News and Guangzhou Daily. The SMD headquarters was created in 1997, located in Guangzhou China which is where it still resides. SMD is written in simplified Mandarin and has a circulation of 1.845 million people. SMD is a public media production company. It is ranked first amongst all local newspapers in the city of Guangzhou.

=== Renovation and Transition ===
In 1995, SMD a weekly newspaper at the time under the name 'Southern Weekly' was failing to profit off its weekly publications. This was because all newspapers at the time were mouthpieces for government statements and because government party officials began to limit the public funding to regional newspapers. The Nanfang Media Group attempted to revive the newspaper however it failed due to limited private funding from advertisers and investors. It was then decided by Nanfang Media Group to discontinue 'Southern Weekly' and create a new tabloid daily newspaper, the 'Southern Metropolis Daily. During this first renovation, SMD comprised 16 pages and employed 200 people in various sections within the newspaper. In 1998, SMD changed its tabloid to feature a yellow and red colours masthead on the front page. In the same year, SMD became the first and only daily tabloid to feature news regarding international relations and policy on its front page. SMD also created 'consumer sections', each daily edition would feature different consumer products. For example, automobile sales would be featured on Monday, and real estate agencies would advertise new property listings within the daily edition on Thursdays. In December 1999, the circulation of SMD was recorded at 600000. Renovations continued with the lengthening of length from 16 pages in 1995 to 72 pages by 2000. In 2000, over 2000 people were employed at SMD with an average age of 27 years old.

=== Pricing history ===
Between the years 1997 and 2007, SMD editions were priced at 0.5 yuan (approximately 0.10AUD). This was the market standard price for all daily tabloids in the Guangdong and Pearl River Delta area. SMD was the first public newspaper in the province to increase its price to 1 yuan in early 2007. In early November 2007, SMD increased its price of the daily edition to 2 yuan, a 200% increase. Its yearly subscription package increased from 360 yuan to 720 yuan making it officially the most expensive daily newspaper tabloid in the Guangdong region.

== Organisation ==
=== News staff ===
SMD reports on local, national, and international issues of public interest related to China. The newspaper has national correspondents throughout China, including Shenzhen, Zhuhai and Xi'an. SMD also has international correspondents in London and Cardiff. As of 2020, SMD employs between 4600 and 5000 employees. SMD has a median employee tenure of 1.8 years and has experienced an 8% growth of employees between November 2020 and April 2021.

== Content ==
=== Editorial stance ===
SMD is a market-based newspaper outlet that aims to create profit. It is a for-profit newspaper with a liberal political alignment. SMD is known for its "Practise of western journalistic norms." SMD focuses on reporting local events such as the Wenchuan earthquake and the Shanxi mining deaths. SMD provides statistical evidence and opinion-based journalism in its reports. SMD engages with the local public by issuing surveys and conducting street interviews with citizens in order to provide multiple perspectives on reportings.

=== Structure ===
SMD provides a daily publication 365 days of the year, this publication is between 70 and 90 pages. Every Saturday, SMD publishes an "in depth weekly review" which is an investigative edition of the publication and reviews events covered in daily editions throughout that week. Of the front page of the newspaper, 30% consists of the masthead and Southern Metropolis Daily banner, whilst 70% is an image or series of images with text. SMD comprises six sections within its daily publication. These include feature article, cultural section, political section, economic section, investigative section history section, consumer section, international section.

=== Style ===
SMD is known for its colourful photographs and its populist style of writing, often breaching censorship laws in order to portray an uncensored depiction to the public. SMD has an investigative style, often incorporating interviews with victims of crimes, police officials and people related to matters of the public interest. SMD's motto is "writing for the people".

== Criticisms and controversies ==
=== The Clinton-Lewinsky publication ===
In 1998, Southern Metropolis Daily received an international fax from an SMD international Correspondent in Indiana which detailed the Clinton-Lewinsky scandal. Of the four Guangdong newspapers that reported on the scandal, SMD was the most popular, selling over one million editions of its 22 January edition, 1998. The SMD chief editor and journalist Cheng Yizhong approved a 10-page excerpt regarding the scandal. This resulted in backlash from Chinese government. Cheng alleged that on 24 January 1998, he received a phone call from an unnamed government censor, who referred to the 22 January report as "vulgar" and made a threat that there would be "severe punishment" if censorship laws continued to be breached by SMD publications.

=== Dismissals and public resignations ===
Employee dismissals in the SMD often occur due to journalist/editor writing styles which do not align with SMD's editorial stance. This is due to strict censorship laws in China. These laws prohibit the publication of viewpoints which are considered "slanderous" to the Chinese government.

On 27 December 2005, Xia Yitao, who was a chief editor for SMD, was completely dismissed from his role. This was due to the front cover article from 26 December which depicted a Guangdong province politician Xu Shaohua having been punished by the Chinese government for a mining accident. In January 2004, SMD deputy chief editor Li Minying and General Manager Yu Huafeng were forced to resign by state officials after being arrested and detained by the Chinese police due to a breach of Chinese censorship laws; having had reported on the alleged police torture of Sun Zhigang. In 2004, Political reform activist and SMD journalist Cheng Yizhong as well as SMD marketing managers Yu Huafeng and Lin Minying were prosecuted by Chinese police on behalf of the China Securities Regulatory Commission for the alleged embezzlement of public funds which were meant to supplement a SMD restructure. In 2010, the director of the SMD column of Chinese history, Zhu Di, published an article entitled "Patriotism does not mean love for the Royal Court." This led to his dismissal in April 2010 due to a breach of the copyright laws in China as it allegedly breached censorship laws in China. On 29 March 2016 an experienced editor and journalist of SMD publicly resigned from the newspaper stating that he could not work under the government censorship laws. On 16 December 2008, deputy chief editor of SMD, Jiang Yiping was demoted from his position to a junior journalist role for unspecified reasons.

=== Climate change ===
Between 2005 and 2015, SMD published 251 articles which investigated and reported on China's contribution to climate change in the 21st century. These publications alleged that China was the world's largest contributor to climate change and pollution-related deaths based on 81 countries. China government officials forced the SMD to remove these publications as they were seen as defamatory to the Chinese government. The Chinese government claimed that these publications lacked scientific evidence to support the claims made. This resulted in public backlash from non-government organisations in China, as well as western countries such as The United States of America. These campaigns called for the abolishment of government intervention in public media outlets such as the SMD.

=== The Sun Zhigang incident ===
On 21 March 2003, Southern Metropolis Daily published an investigative report on the death of Sun Zhigang, a university student who died while detained under China's forced custody and repatriation system. The system allowed police to detain and imprison individuals unable to produce an occupation or residence permit in China, where internal migration is tightly controlled. SMD's expose led to public backlash and the eventual repeal of the forced repatriation law on 2 April 2003. However, it also led to the authorities' retaliatory imprisonment of SMD journalists Cheng Yizhong, Li Minying, and Yu Huafeng. In 2005, Cheng Yizhong was awarded the UNESCO/Guillermo Cano World Press Freedom Prize for his resistance to Chinese censorship laws and police corruption.

=== SARS epidemic scandal ===
During the SARS epidemic outbreak between 2002 and 2004, the Chinese government called for a National People's Congress session in March 2002. During this congress session, the Chinese government strictly prohibited the publication of statements within media outlets that did not coincide with the message that the Chinese government was in control of SARS disease. Southern Metropolis Daily was ordered to present a false account of SARS statistics including; an understatement of SARS cases in the Guangdong region and an overstatement of doctors and SARS clinics in this area. On 20 March 2003 SMD published this false information in the form of a government statement in their daily edition as per the censorship laws in China. SMD editors Cheng Yizhong, Yu Huafeng, and Lin Minying were opposed to this publication. In response, on 4 April 2003, these editors quoted the deputy minister of Health Gao Qiang who allegedly stated that the SARS epidemic was out of control throughout China and included this statement in the daily edition of SMD. In response, Zang Dejiang who was the part chief of Guangdong at the time ordered Cheng, YU, and Lin to report to him in Guangzhou City. This resulted in a verbal warning on behalf of the Chinese Government.

=== The imprisonment of journalists ===
Following the SMD reporting on the 'Sun Zhigang Incident' and subsequent repeal of the 'forced repatriation law', SMD were under strict surveillance from government officials and Guangdong province media censors. Cheng Yizhong alleges that the government advised advertisers to cease interaction with the newspaper, as well as government officials such as police officers who were ordered not to engage in interviews or make statements to SMD. In November 2003, The Chinese Government launched an official investigation on SMD, specifically the reporters who were involved with the 'Sun Zhigang Incident' report; Cheng Yizhong, Yu Huafeng, and Li Minying. On 27 November, Guangdong province police raided SMD headquarters and seized all tax forms and expense reports. On 2 December at approximately 11 AM, Yu Huafeng was arrested in the breakroom of SMD publishing headquarters pending an investigation of fraud and treason against the Chinese government. This investigation continued into the first two weeks of January and the second arrest occurred on 6 January 2004, Li Mingyu was arrested on suspicion of fraud and treason as well. On 8 January, Cheng received a phone call from an anonymous police whistleblower who allegedly informed Cheng that Yu had been severely tortured by officials, and as a result, attempted suicide unsuccessfully. In 2008, Cheng told author Philip Pan "The pain was like a knife twisting in my heart. It was guilt and outrage at the same time. And it intensified my hatred of the system."

On 18 March, Cheng was forced to demote himself from the editor in chief of SMD. On 22 March 2004, Yu Huafeng was convicted of Fraud and treason in the Supreme People's Court in Beijing and sentenced to a minimum of twelve years in a Liangxiang Prison in Tianjin Municipality district. On the same day, Li Mingyu was convicted of the same offense and received an eleven-year prison sentence in Yanqing Prison in Yanqing District. On 23 March 2004, officers of the Chinese Federal Police arrested Cheng in his apartment in Guangzhou City. He was arrested for allegedly accepting illegal payments to report on the Sun Zhigang incident. He was detained at Panyu Prison in Guangzhou pending trial. Cheng reported receiving severe psychological abuse in the form of mocking and unlawful solitary confinement periods with no sunlight in his cell. While Cheng was awaiting a pending trial, SMD launched multiple campaigns advocating for his freedom and launched a petition in April which was signed by major Newspaper outlets such as China Daily. In late April, mass awareness had been spread and fourteen former and current provincial party chiefs demanded a review of the evidence against Cheng, Yu and Li. This review of Evidence resulted in a re-trial in the Supreme People's Court in Fuyang court and on 6 August a decision from the 10th National People's Congress and its president judge Xiao Yang found Cheng innocent of all crimes. Li's sentence was reduced to five months 'time served' and was released on the 18 August. Yu's sentence was reduced to four years including 'time served', he was released in late 2009.

== Awards and achievements ==
=== SMD coverage of the FIFA World Cup in 1998 ===
Between 10 June and 12 July during the FIFA world cup of 1998, SMD broke a national record as the longest coverage of a sports event in history. SMD achieved this through a consecutive forty-three-day coverage of the world cup. This assisted SMD in establishing themselves as a dominant newspaper in the Guangdong Region as China's football followers were amongst the largest in the world at the time.
