= Law enforcement in China =

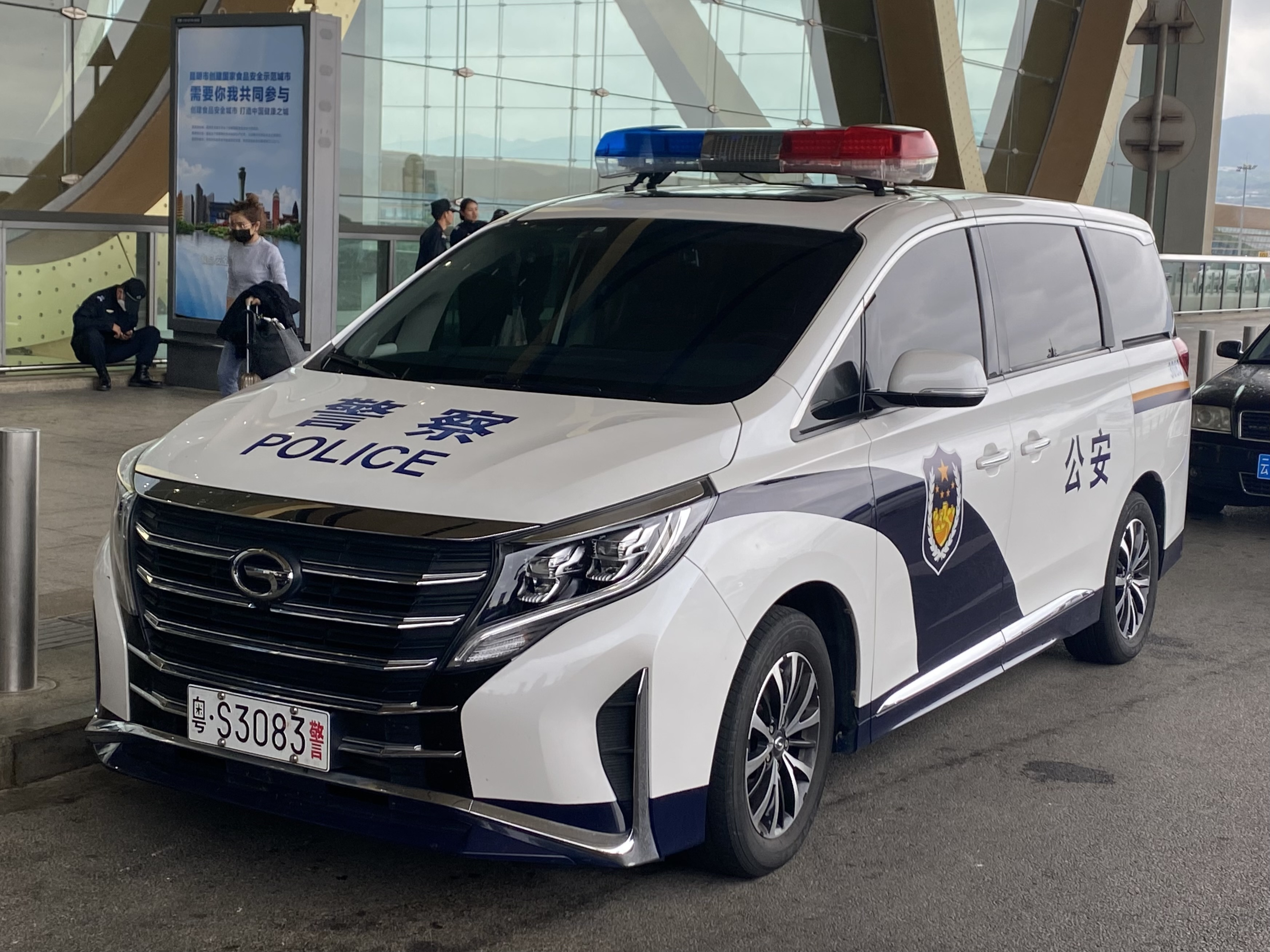
GAC Trumpchi M8 police car

Law enforcement in the People's Republic of China is the responsibility of public security agencies, including the People's Police and People's Armed Police in mainland China. Hong Kong and Macau have separate law enforcement agencies, different legal systems, and are classified as separate jurisdictions under the one country, two systems framework. However, the Hong Kong Police Force (HKPF) and Public Security Police Force in Macau often cooperate with the mainland MPS on cases involving cross border crime.

== Overview ==
The national security system is made up of the Ministry of Public Security (MPS) and the Ministry of State Security (MSS), the People's Armed Police (PAP), the People's Liberation Army (PLA), and the state judicial, procuratorial, and penal systems. The Central Political and Legal Affairs Commission vets all law enforcement officers and legal officials for political reliability.

The Ministry of Public Security (MPS) oversees all domestic police activity in China. The ministry is responsible for police operations and detention centers and has dedicated departments for internal political, economic, and communications security. The Ministry of State Security (MSS) was established in 1983 to ensure "the security of the state through effective measures against enemy agents, spies, and counterrevolutionary activities designed to sabotage or overthrow China's socialist system." The Ministry of Justice maintains oversees the operation of prisons.

=== Judicial system ===
The judiciary of the People's Republic of China (PRC) is organized under the principle of unified state power of the National People's Congress (NPC) and is represented by its two primary judicial organs, the Supreme People's Court and the Supreme People's Procuratorate. These organs are constitutionally inferior and accountable to the NPC as the supreme state organ of power, and implement its political will.

== Key organizations ==
=== Ministry of Public Security ===
The Ministry of Public Security (MPS; Chinese: 公安部; pinyin: Gōng'ānbù) (Note: Mandarin pronunciation: [kʊ́ŋ.án.pû]; abbreviation of Chinese: 公共安全部; pinyin: Gōnggòng Ānquán Bù; lit. 'Public Security Ministry' Mandarin pronunciation: [kʊ́ŋ.kʊ̂ŋ án.tɕʰɥɛ̌n pû]) is the primary law enforcement agency of the People's Republic of China (PRC). A constituent department of the State Council, the ministry oversees more than 1.9 million of the country's law enforcement officers and as such the vast majority of the People's Police. While the MPS is a nationwide police force, conducting counterintelligence and maintaining the political security of the Chinese Communist Party (CCP) are also core functions.

=== People's Armed Police ===
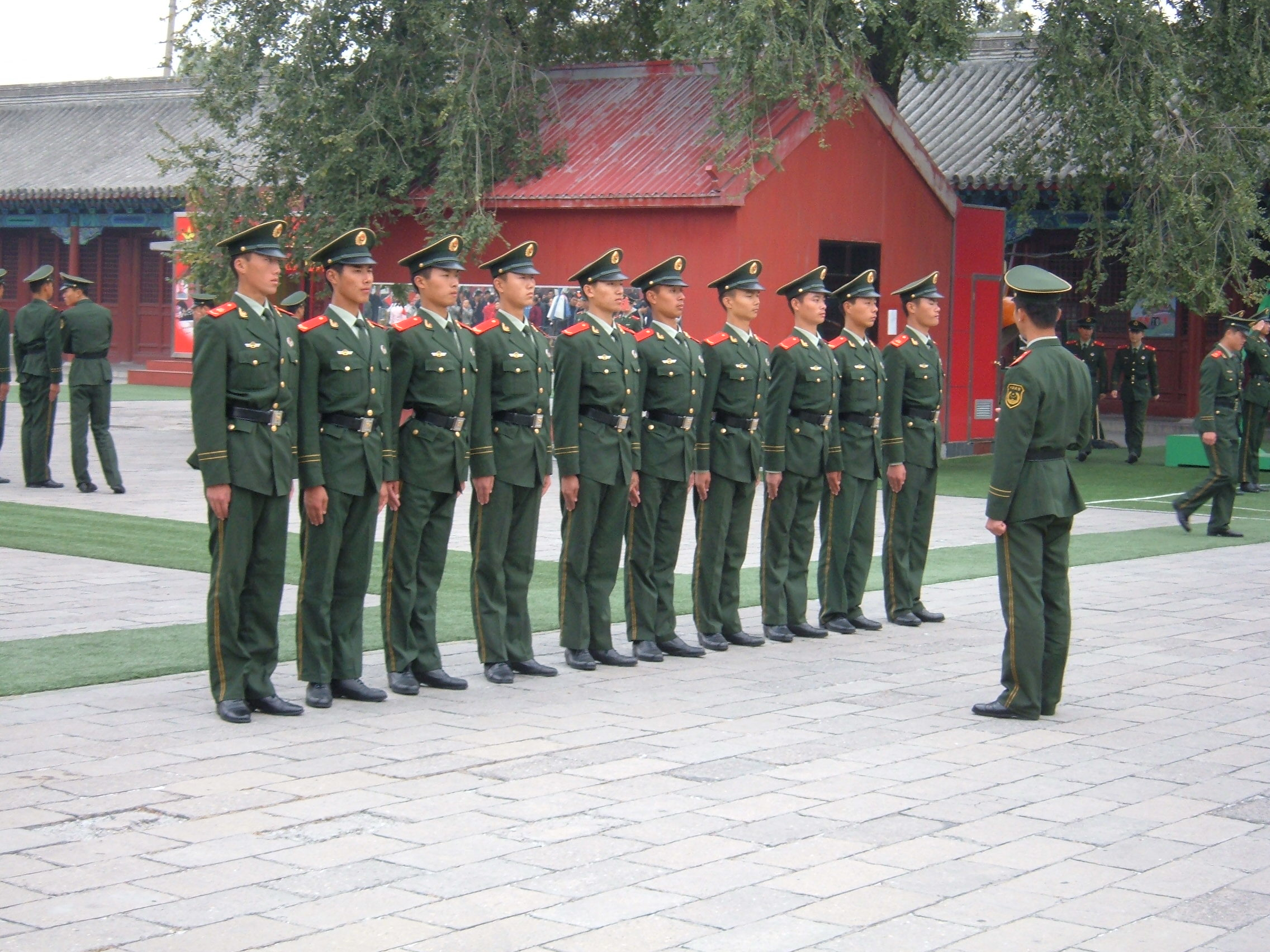
A People's Armed Police squad in the Forbidden City, Beijing.

The People's Armed Police Force, abbreviated PAP, (Note: Chinese: 中国人民武装警察部队; pinyin: Zhōngguó Rénmín Wǔzhuāng Jǐngchá Bùduì; abbreviation: 武警 (Wǔjǐng)) is a Chinese gendarmerie organization primarily responsible for internal security, riot control, counter-terrorism, disaster response, law enforcement and maritime rights protection as well as providing support to the People's Liberation Army (PLA) during wartime.

=== Chengguan ===
Chengguan (城管; 'Urban management', short for 城市管理执法; ''Urban Management and Law Enforcement'') is an administrative practice of city-level local governments in the People's Republic of China to oversee and manage city appearance and public environments according to the region's bylaws. Chengguan are non-sworn civil agencies and are not entitled police powers.

== Police vehicles ==
Police cars in the mainland are white with a dark blue swoosh painted on the side such as BYD e6. Police cars in Hong Kong and Macau use local liveries.

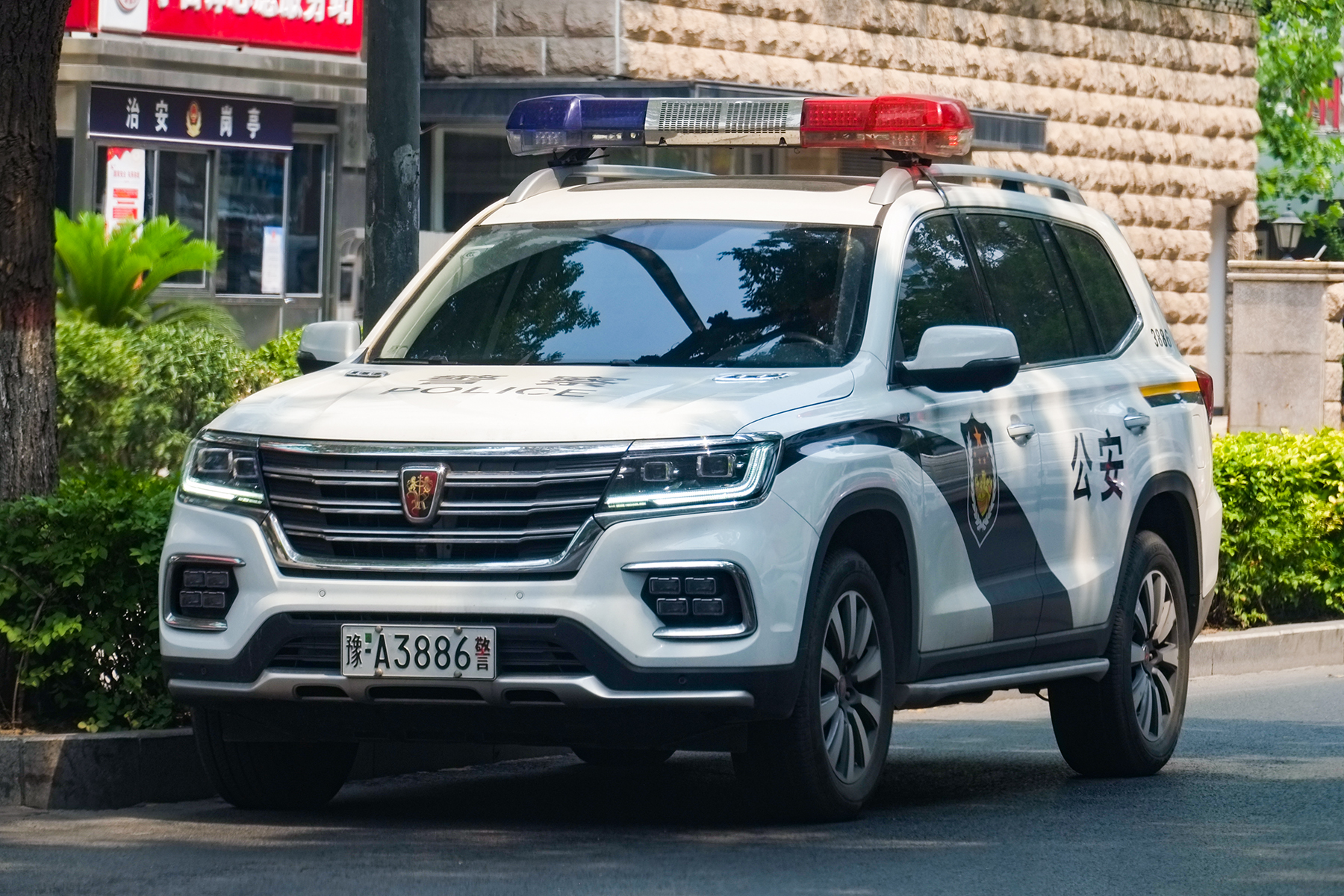
Roewe RX8

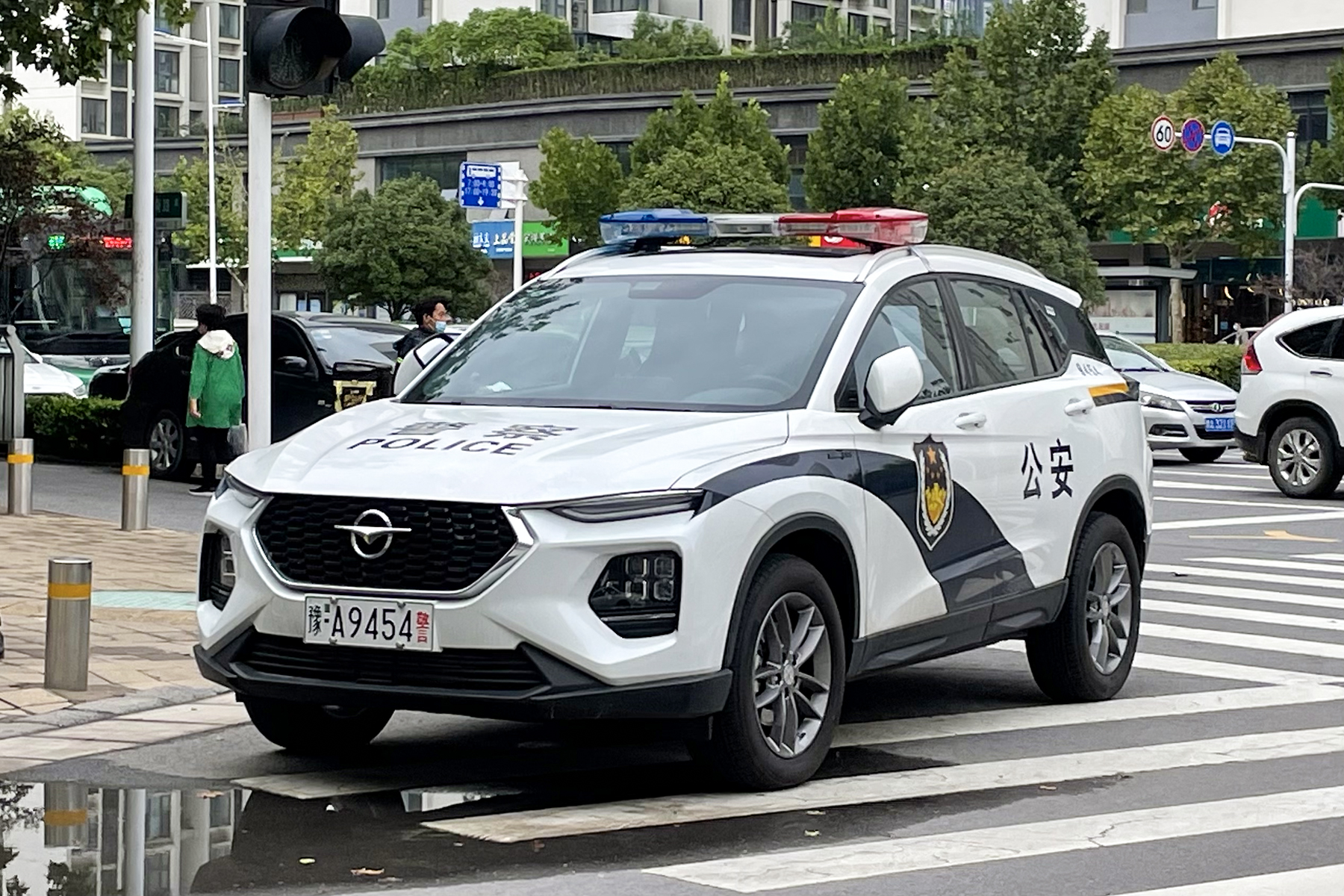
Haima 8S

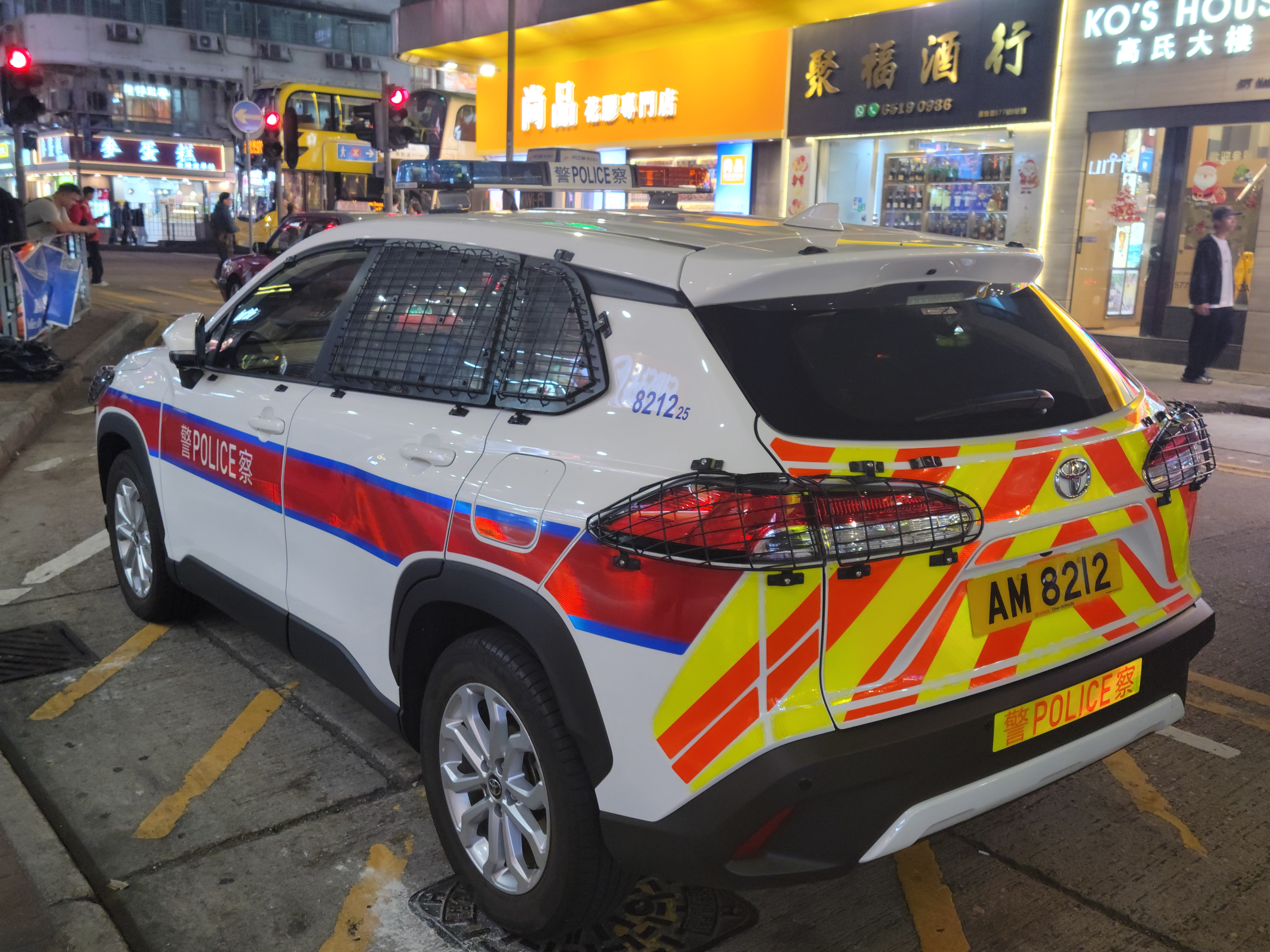
Toyota Corolla Cross in Hong Kong

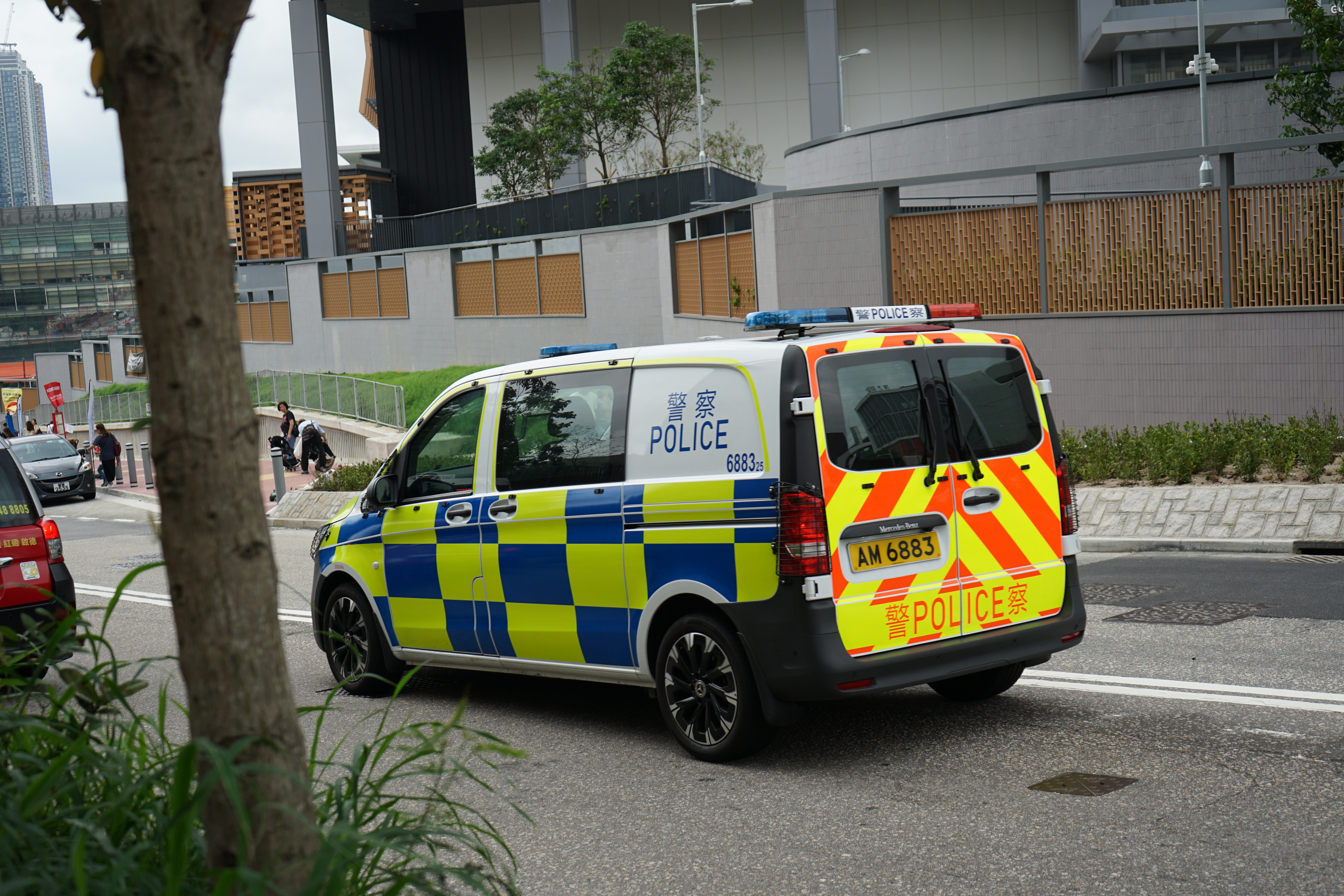
Mercedes-Benz Vito in Hong Kong

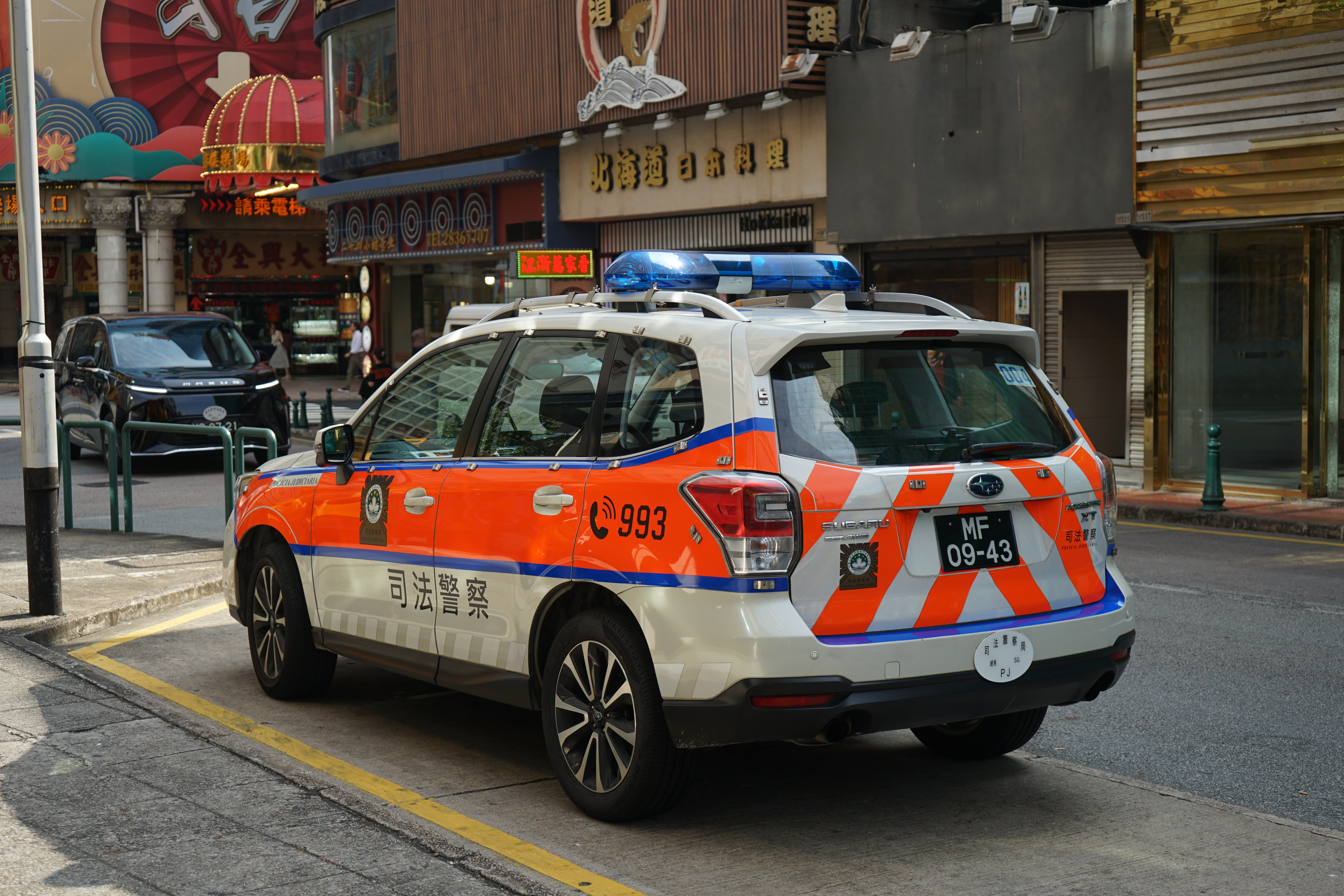
Subaru Forester in Macau

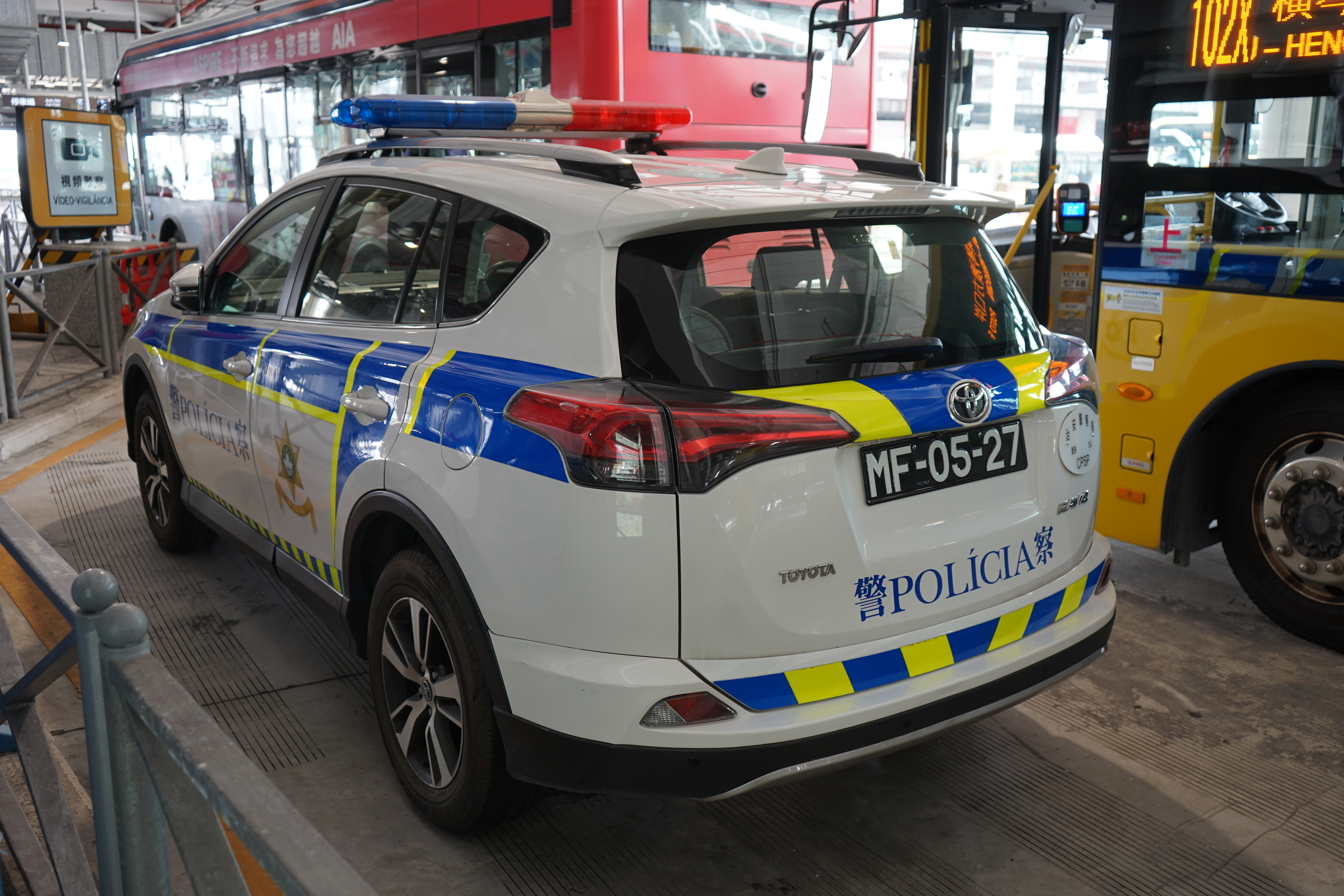
Toyota RAV4 in Macau

== See also ==
- Crime in China
- Court system of the People's Republic of China
- Law of the People's Republic of China
- Ministry of Public Security of the People's Republic of China
  - Public Security Bureau (PSB)
- People's Armed Police
- Ministry of State Security of the People's Republic of China
- Ministry of Justice of the People's Republic of China
- Terrorism in the People's Republic of China
- Custody and repatriation 1982 -2003
- Secretariat for Security (Macau)
- Macau Security Force
  - Public Security Police Force
- Law enforcement in Hong Kong
  - Security Bureau (Hong Kong)
    - Hong Kong Police Force
- Judiciary of Hong Kong
- Department of Justice (Hong Kong)
- Judiciary of Macau
- Legal system of Macau
- Secretary for Justice (Macau)
