= Sun Zhigang incident =

Death of a migrant worker in Guangzhou, Guangdong, China

The Sun Zhigang incident (Chinese: 孙志刚事件) refers to the 2003 death of the migrant worker Sun Zhigang in Guangzhou, as a result of physical abuse he suffered while being detained under China's custody and repatriation (C&R) system. The case received massive attention in the media and on the Internet in China, resulting in the abolition of the C&R system by the national government.

== The victim ==
Sun Zhigang (Chinese: 孙志刚; 1976–2003) was from Huanggang, Hubei Province. He was a graduate of Wuhan University of Science and Technology. After the Chinese New Year of 2003, he left Hubei for the coastal Guangdong Province, an area of south China that depends on migrant labor. He first found a job in Shenzhen, but later went to Guangzhou to work for Daqi Garment Company.

== Detention and death ==
On March 20, 2003, 27-year-old Sun Zhigang died in the medical clinic of a detention center (Chinese: 拘留所) in Guangzhou. He had been detained after being unable to produce his temporary living permit (Chinese: 暂住证) and his resident identity card when he was stopped by the police. He had not applied for the permit and he had forgotten to carry his ID card. His residence permit (hukou) was with his family in Hubei. He called his friends to bring him his ID card. Three days later, a friend called his family to tell them of the death.

An official autopsy at Sun Yat-sen University, authorized by Sun's family, found evidence of a savage beating of his body 72 hours prior to death. The detention center's medical clinic had reported the cause of death was a heart attack or a stroke.

== Reactions ==
Sun's family reported the information to investigative reporters at Southern Metropolis Daily in Guangdong, on April 25, during the SARS epidemic—the official reaction or lack of it due to SARS having already created much controversy on the Internet, but soon Internet activity skyrocketed, hundreds of thousands of messages, with help from Sun's friends and outraged sympathizers. Some believed that the government censored postings, while most people wanted the government to take some action, but attention was focused only on the Sun case, not the general issue of C&R.

Among these reactions, two groups of senior Chinese legal scholars wrote to the National People's Congress, questioning the constitutionality of the custody and repatriation regulation. One particular problem with the regulations was said to be that they had been adopted as regulations by the State Council and not as a law by the full Congress. As a result, it was argued, the C&R law for migrant workers was unconstitutional, on the grounds that it violated citizens' rights articles of the Constitution. Chinese law does not provide for constitutional judicial review, and therefore reform of laws deemed unconstitutional is the responsibility of the legislators and administrators. There has been some movement by legal reformers to use courts and bureaucracy to experiment with constitutionalism.

A similar argument was that the custody and repatriation regulations "violate the 1996 Administrative Punishment Law, which states that administrative punishments which restrict personal freedom may only be authorized by laws passed by the [full] Congress." Both criticisms echoed statements published in earlier years by lawyers and legal scholars.

In addition to the legal arguments, some reports by those with contact with the detention centers (including an official report) indicated that not only were the conditions worse than prisons or reeducation camps (including beatings and prolonged detentions without trial), but also sometimes the police used the system to kidnap and extort more expenses from the families of the accused. These reports echoed earlier ignored warnings.

== Investigation ==
Southern Metropolis Daily chief editor Cheng Yizhong and three editors were charged with corruption in connection with the Sun case reporting, and other offenses. Allegedly Cheng misused funds from a (local) state-owned enterprise. Human rights defense lawyers asserted that the actions were local official revenge for the journalists' expression of press freedom. Whatever the case, their defense lawyers quickly secured his release from prison, as well as that of another, and reduced sentences for the others. Human rights defense lawyers considered the Sun and Cheng cases together as a victory for the budding weiquan movement.

In June 2003, two people found directly responsible for murdering Sun were sentenced to death (one suspended), 10 accessories were sent to prison for terms between six months and life, six civil servants were sentenced to prison terms of two to three years for malpractice, and later a head nurse was sentenced to two years in prison. Some criticized the decisions because the police investigated, but they concluded no police were indicted. Sun's father, Sun Liusong, received a $53,000 settlement from the government and stated "now Zhigang can sleep well in the nether world."

Southern Metropolis Daily's coverage led to a nationwide backlash against the Custody & Repatriation law and ultimately to its repeal.

== Legacy ==
On June 20, 2003, Premier Wen Jiabao announced the abolition of the custody and repatriation system, effective August 1. The detention centers would be replaced by service stations to care for poor beggars or homeless persons under the new Measures for Assisting Vagrants and Beggars with No Means of Support in Cities. The centers for vagrants are not allowed to collect fees from families nor require them to work. The legal system of hukou and residency and work permits for migrant workers was unchanged.
