= Trumpchi E8 =

Chinese minivan

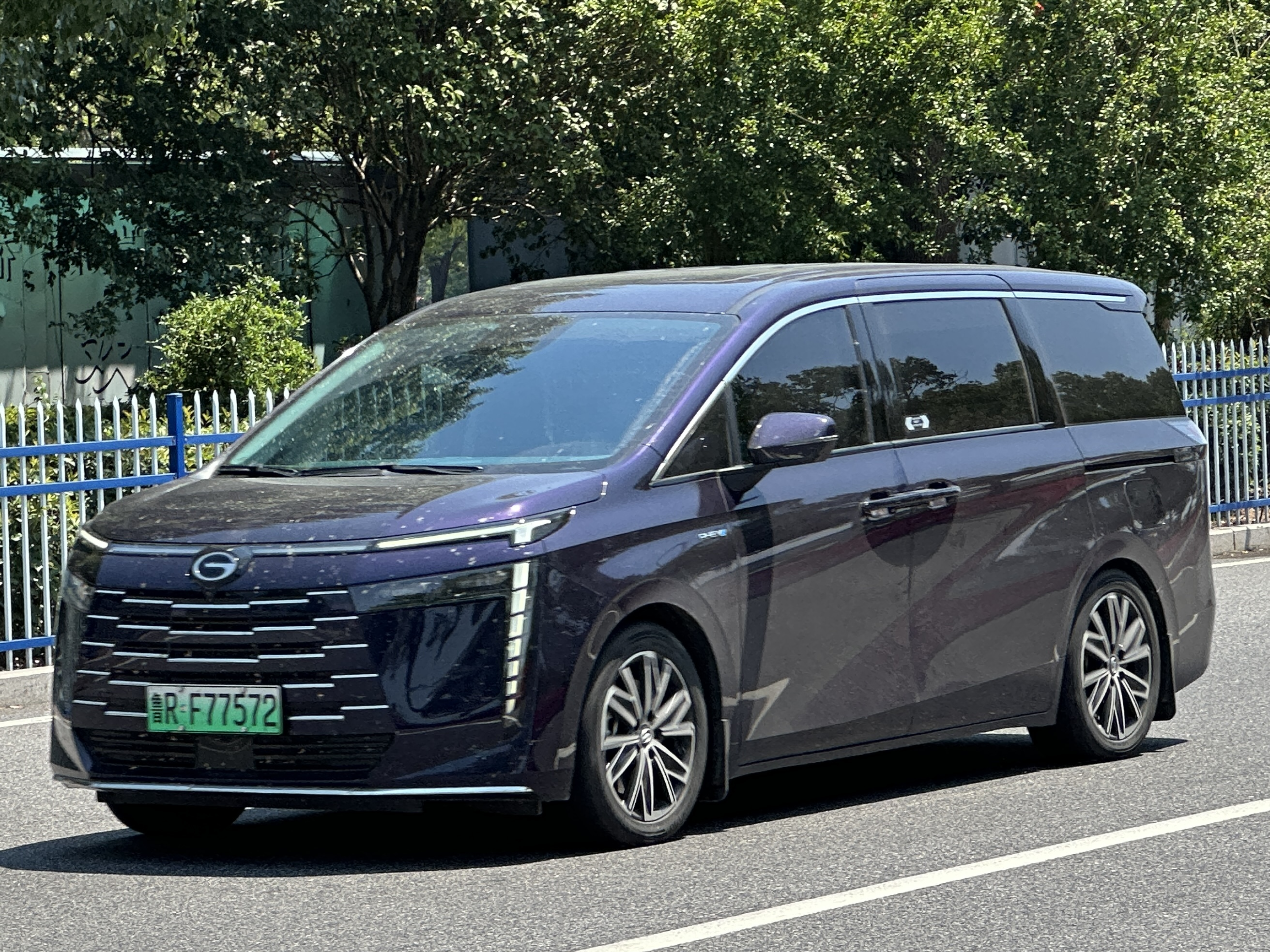

Overview
- Manufacturer: GAC Motor
- Also called: Trumpchi Xiangwang E8; GAC E8 (Philippines)
- Production: 2023–present
- Assembly: China: Guangzhou

Body and chassis
- Class: Minivan
- Body style: 5-door minivan

Powertrain
- Engine: Petrol Hybrid: 2.0 L AB20L1 I4
- Electric motor: Permanent magnet synchronous motor
- Power output: 103 kW (138 hp; 140 PS) (engine); 134 kW (180 hp; 182 PS) (electric motor); 175 kW (235 hp; 238 PS) (combined system output)
- Transmission: 2-speed DHT
- Hybrid drivetrain: HEV; PHEV
- Battery: 25.57 kWh NMC (plug-in Hybrid)
- Electric range: Up to 116 km (72 mi) (WLTP, plug-in Hybrid); Up to 150 km (93 mi) (CLTC, plug-in Hybrid)

Dimensions
- Wheelbase: 2,930 mm (115.4 in)
- Length: 4,920 mm (193.7 in)
- Width: 1,900 mm (74.8 in)
- Height: 1,760 mm (69.3 in)
- Curb weight: 1,925–2,005 kg (4,244–4,420 lb) (hybrid); 2,112–2,175 kg (4,656–4,795 lb) (plug-in Hybrid)

The Trumpchi E8 is a minivan produced by Chinese automobile manufacturer GAC Group and sold under the Trumpchi brand in China since 2023 and the GAC Motor brand in the Philippine market.

== Overview ==
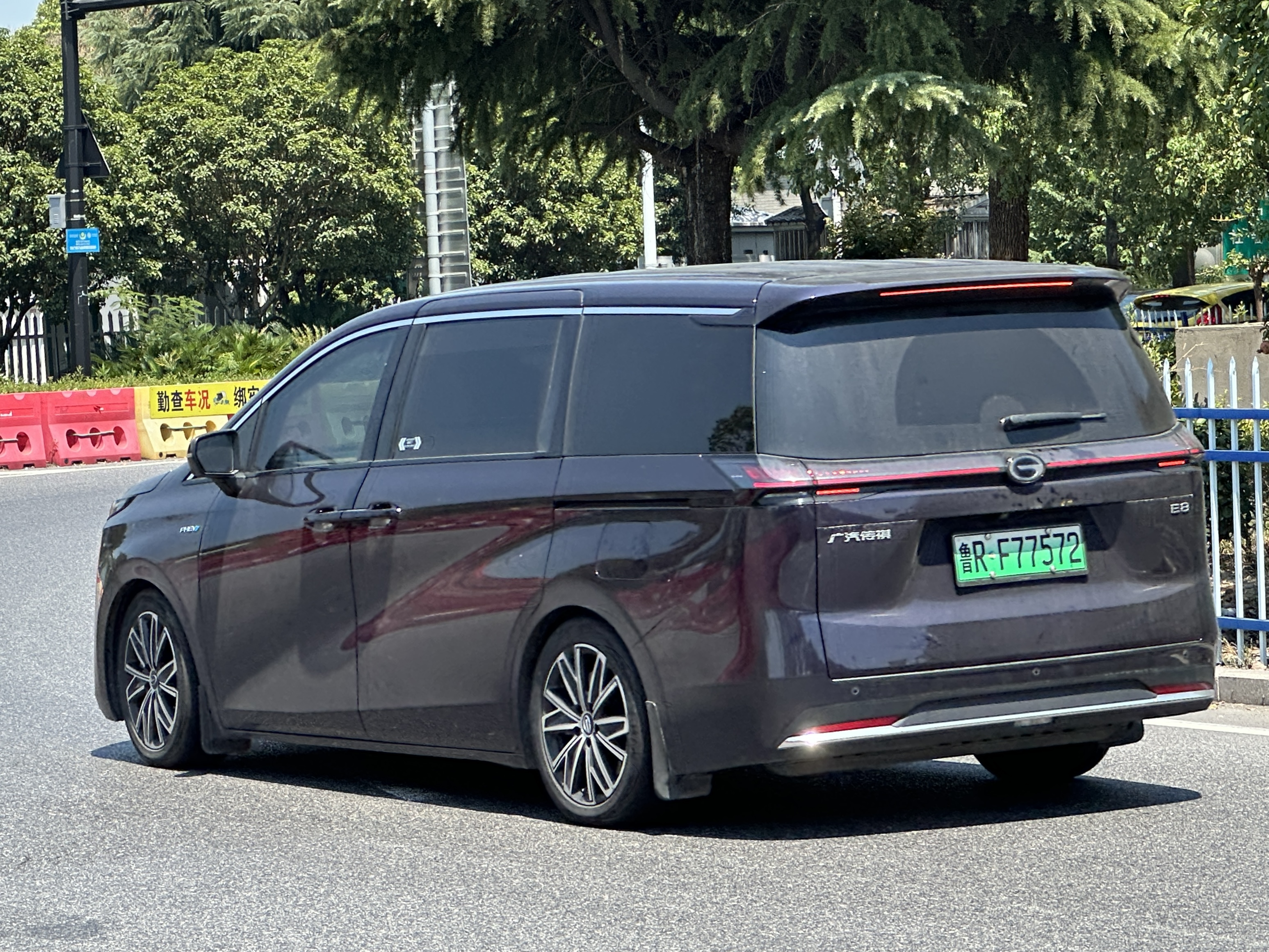
Rear view

Renderings of the E8 were first revealed online in August 2023. The plug-in hybrid version of the E8 went on sale in China in December 2023.

A hybrid version of the E8 without plug-in capability was released in China on July 16, 2024. This version was unveiled in the Philippines as the GAC E8 in GL and GX trims on July 29, 2026, alongside the GAC GN6 and the GAC GN8 PHEV Executive.

== Powertrain ==
The E8 is available in both the PRO and MAX trims. Both trim models are powered by a 2.0 L hybrid engine which has an output of 103 kW (138 hp) and 180 N⋅m (133 lb⋅ft) of torque and a motor powered by a 25.57 kWh ternary lithium battery pack that produces 134 kW (180 hp) and 300 N⋅m (221 lb⋅ft) of torque. Its China Light-Duty Vehicle Test Cycle (CLTC) electric range is 150 km (93 mi) with its combined range exceeding 1,200 km (746 mi).

Specs
| Model | Years | Engine | Transmission | Power | Torque | 0–100 km/h (0–62 mph) (Official) | Top speed |
Hybrid
| E8 HEV | 2024–present | 2.0 L I4 | 2-speed DHT | 175 kW (238 PS; 235 hp) | | | 160 km/h (99 mph) |
Plug-in Hybrid
| E8 PHEV | 2023–present | 2.0 L I4 | 2-speed DHT | 175 kW (238 PS; 235 hp) | | 8.8s | 170 km/h (106 mph) |

== Sales ==
| Year | China | |
| Year | HEV | PHEV |
|---|---|---|
| 2023 | — | 4,034 |
| 2024 | 11,064 | 33,358 |
| 2025 | 15,259 | 15,298 |

== Trumpchi Xiangwang E8 ==
Launched in June 2026, the Xiangwang E8 is a facelift variant of the E8 powered by a plug-in hybrid powertrain combining a 1.5 liter turbo engine with a maximum output of 125 kW and an electric motor.

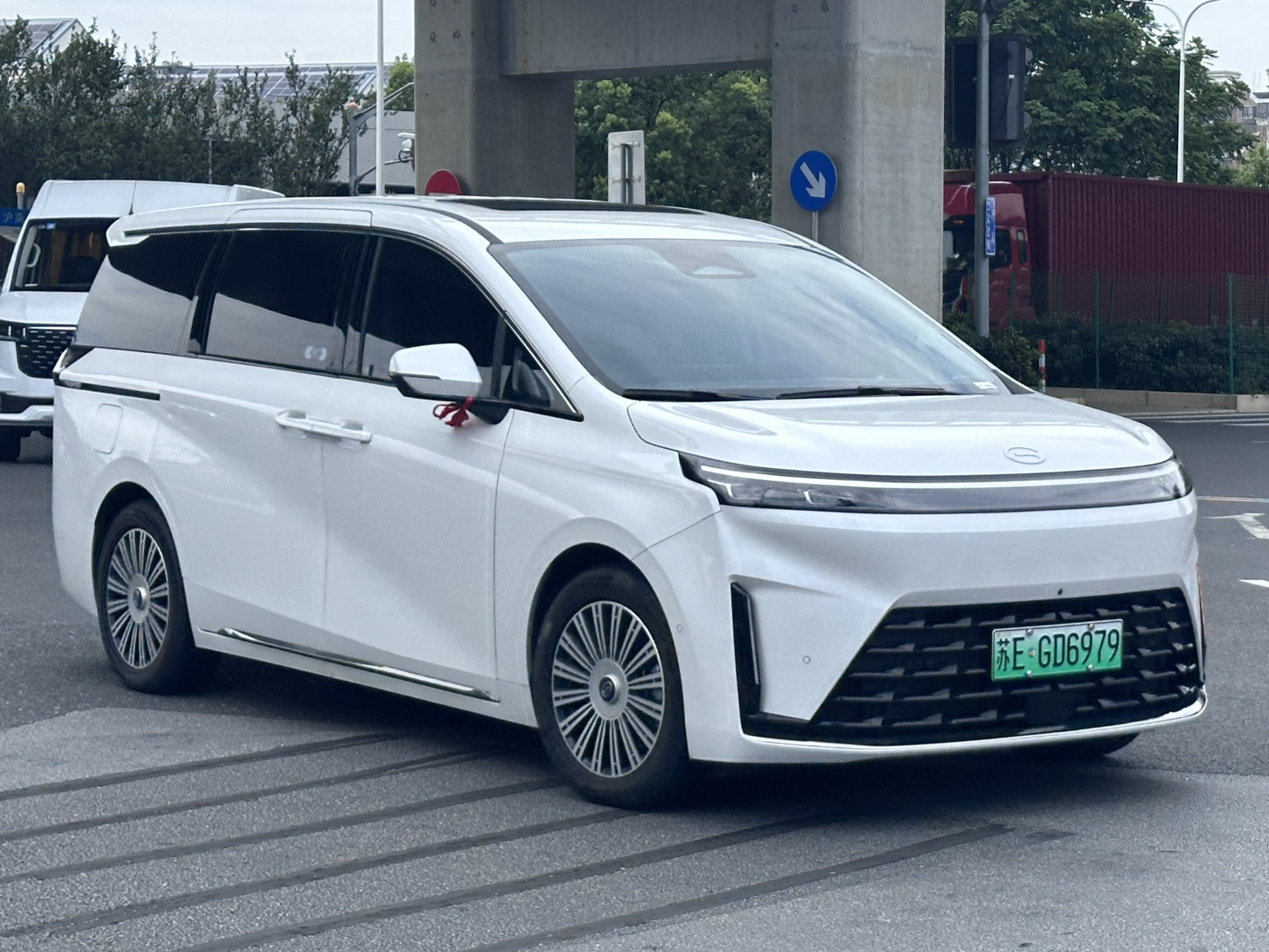
Trumpchi Xiangwang E8

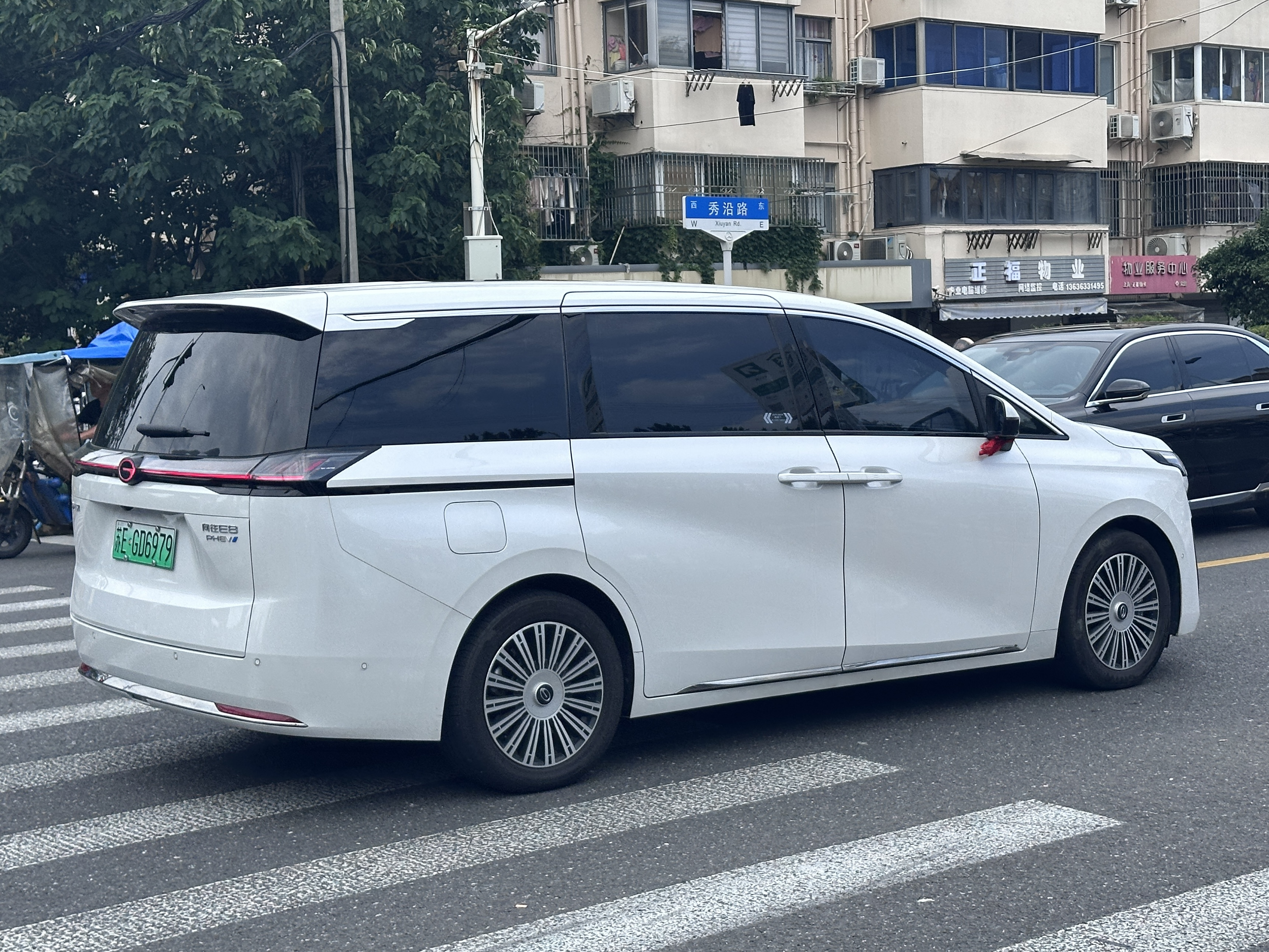
Rear view
