= Trumpchi M8 =

Minivan produced by GAC Group

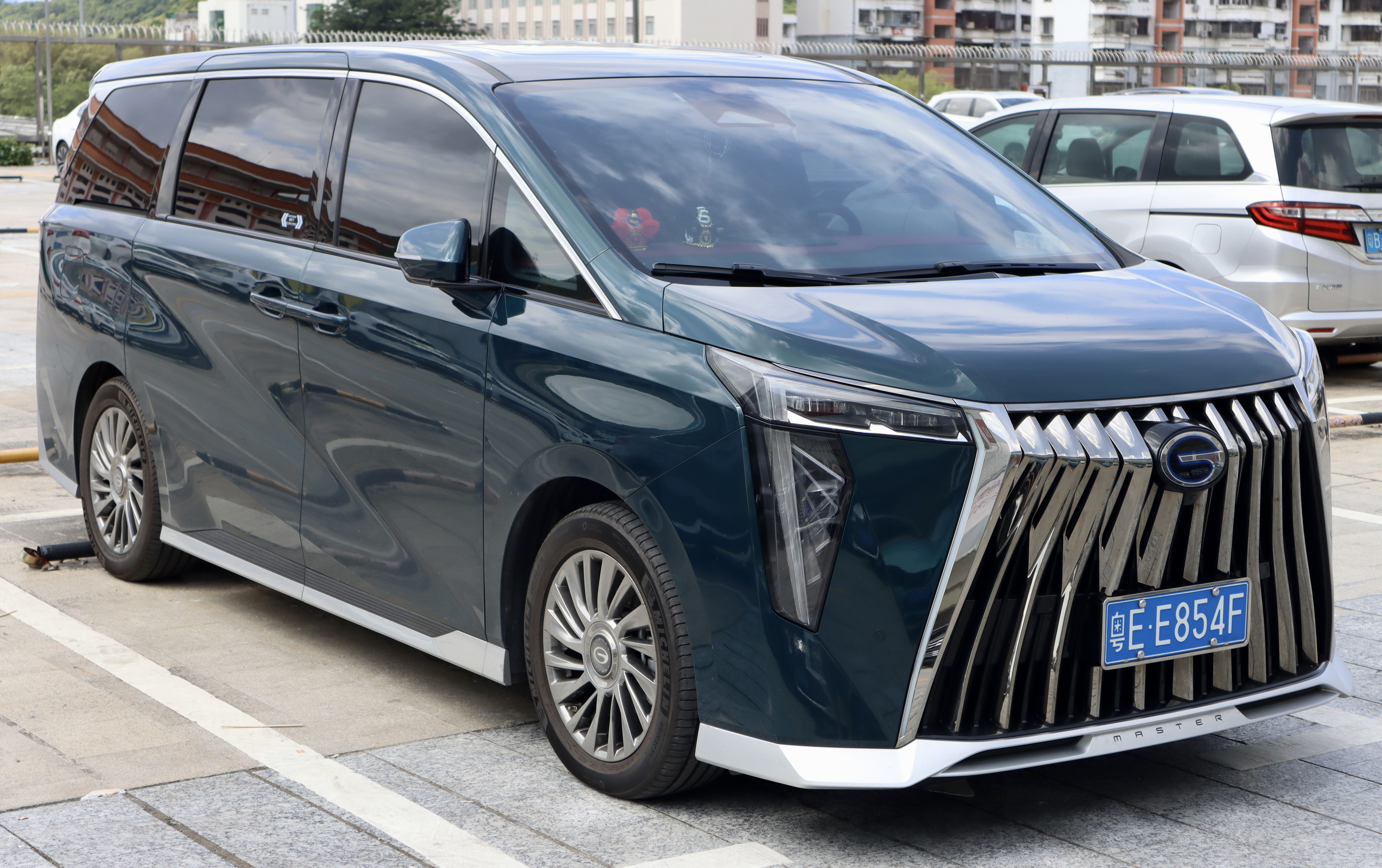
- 2022 Trumpchi M8 Master (宗师) Hybrid

Overview
- Manufacturer: GAC Motor
- Also called: GAC M8; Trumpchi GM8 (China, 2017–2020); GAC GM8; GAC GN8
- Production: 2017–present
- Assembly: China: Guangzhou

Body and chassis
- Class: Minivan
- Body style: 5-door minivan
- Layout: Front-engine, front-wheel-drive; Front-engine, four-wheel-drive

The Trumpchi M8 is a minivan manufactured by GAC Group under the Trumpchi brand in China and the GAC Motor brand globally. Originally launched as the GM8 in 2017, it was renamed in 2020 to simply M8 in China and GN8 in global markets. The completely redesigned second generation M8 was launched in 2022.

== First generation (2017) ==
First generation
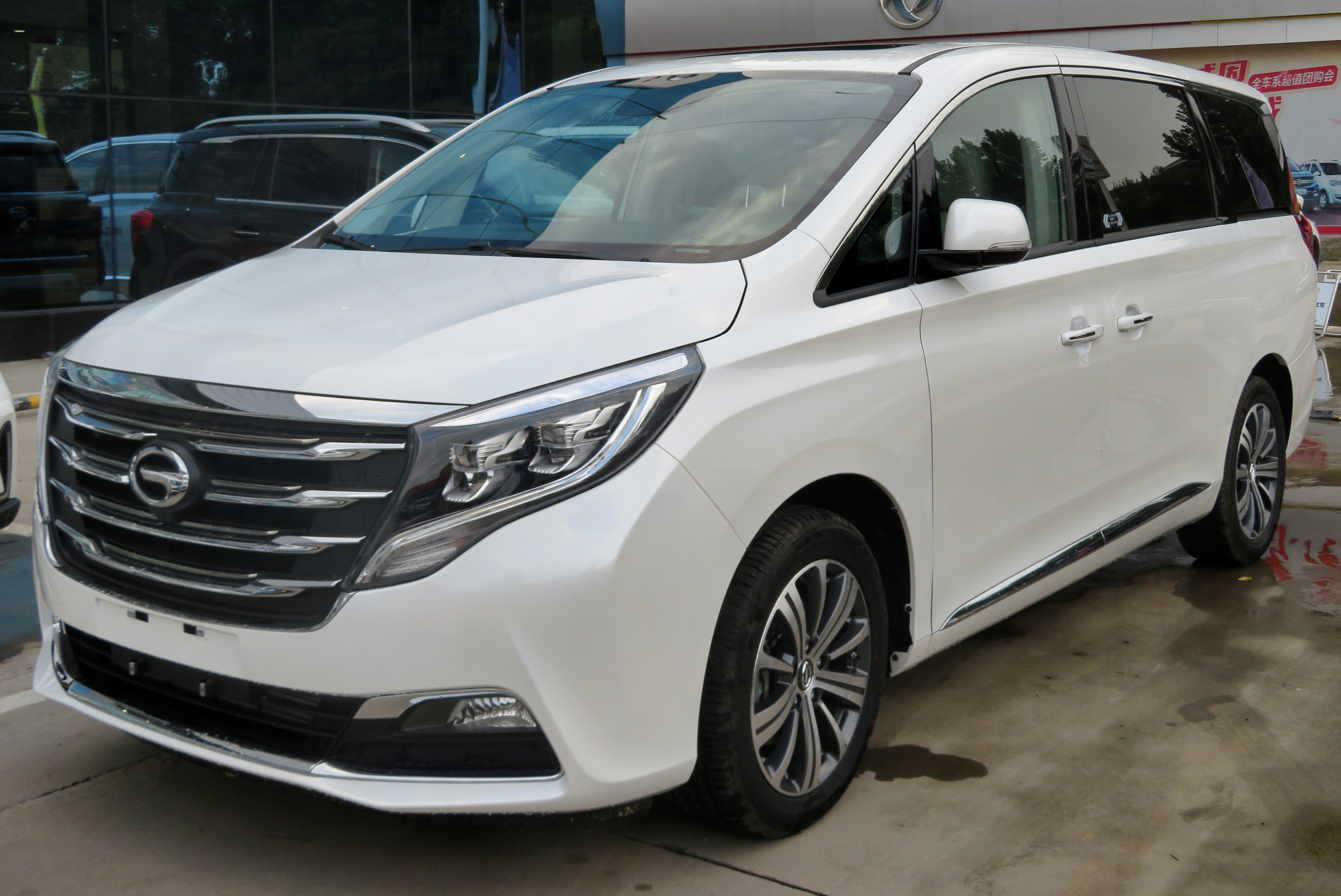
- Trumpchi GM8

Overview
- Also called: Trumpchi GM8 (2017–2020); GAC GM8; GAC GN8 (Middle East)
- Production: 2017–2025

Powertrain
- Engine: Petrol: 2.0 L 4B20M1 turbo I4; 2.0 L 4B20J1 turbo I4
- Transmission: 6-speed DCT; 8-speed Aisin automatic

Dimensions
- Wheelbase: 3,000 mm (118.1 in)
- Length: 5,066–5,089 mm (199.4–200.4 in); 5,149–5,156 mm (202.7–203.0 in) (Master Edition)
- Width: 1,884–1,923 mm (74.2–75.7 in)
- Height: 1,822 mm (71.7 in)
- Kerb weight: 2,002–2,060 kg (4,414–4,542 lb)

In China, the Trumpchi M8 and the previous GM8 is classified as a full-size seven-seat MPV, competing with cars like the Buick GL8. It was launched at the 2017 Auto Guangzhou as Trumpchi's first entry into the MPV segment. At launch, the GM8 is the largest passenger car that GAC has ever built and that makes it Trumpchi's flagship MPV. It was launched in the Chinese car market in the first quarter of 2018. Originally shown in a seven-seat 2/2/3 setup, GAC also offers a longer variant with more seats.

There are nine trim levels of the Trumpchi GM8 for the 2020 model year, all equipped with a 2.0-litre turbocharged inline-4 petrol engine rated at 252 hp (188 kW) and 390 N⋅m (288 lb⋅ft) of torque, and a 6-speed dual-clutch transmission.

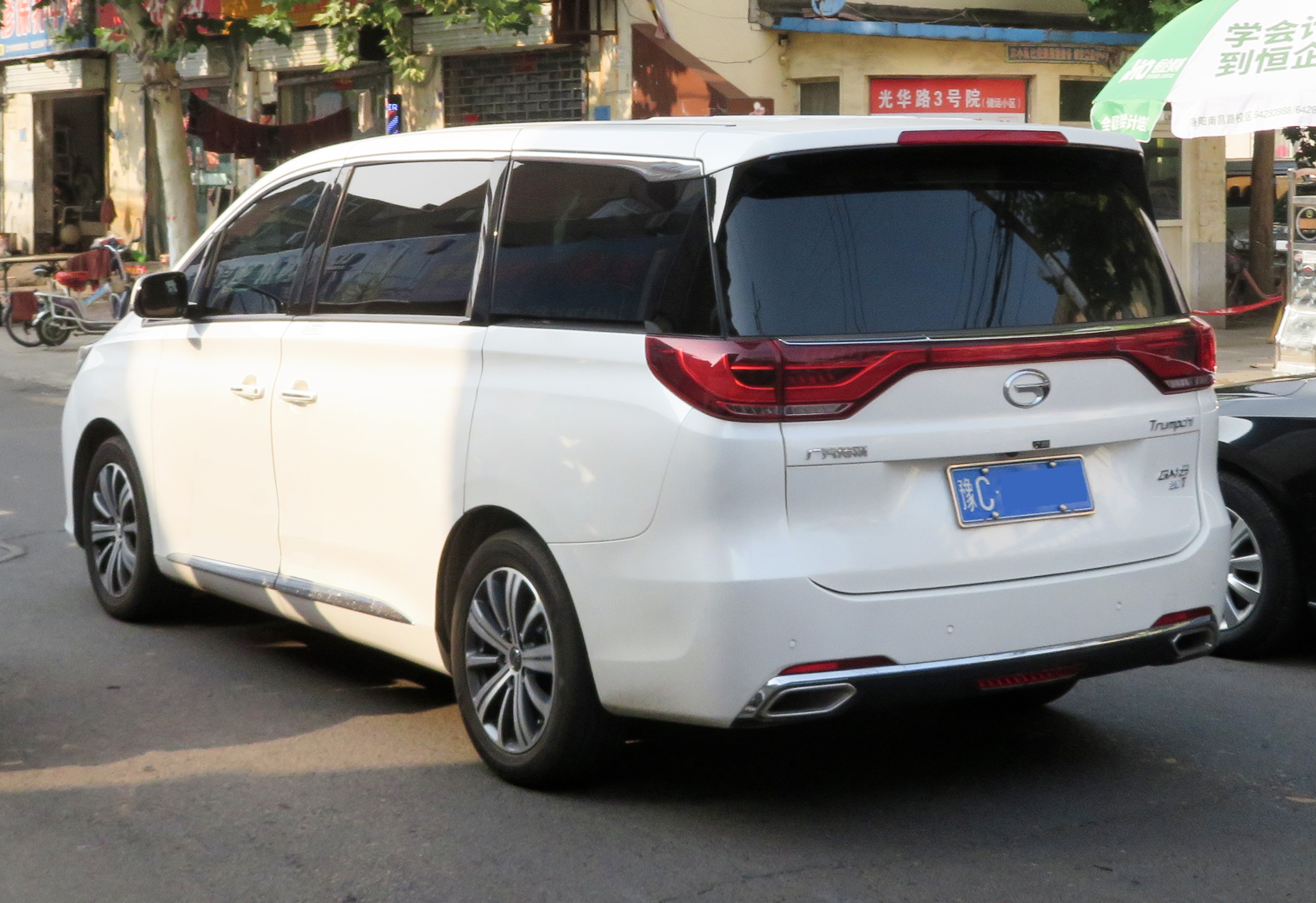
Rear view

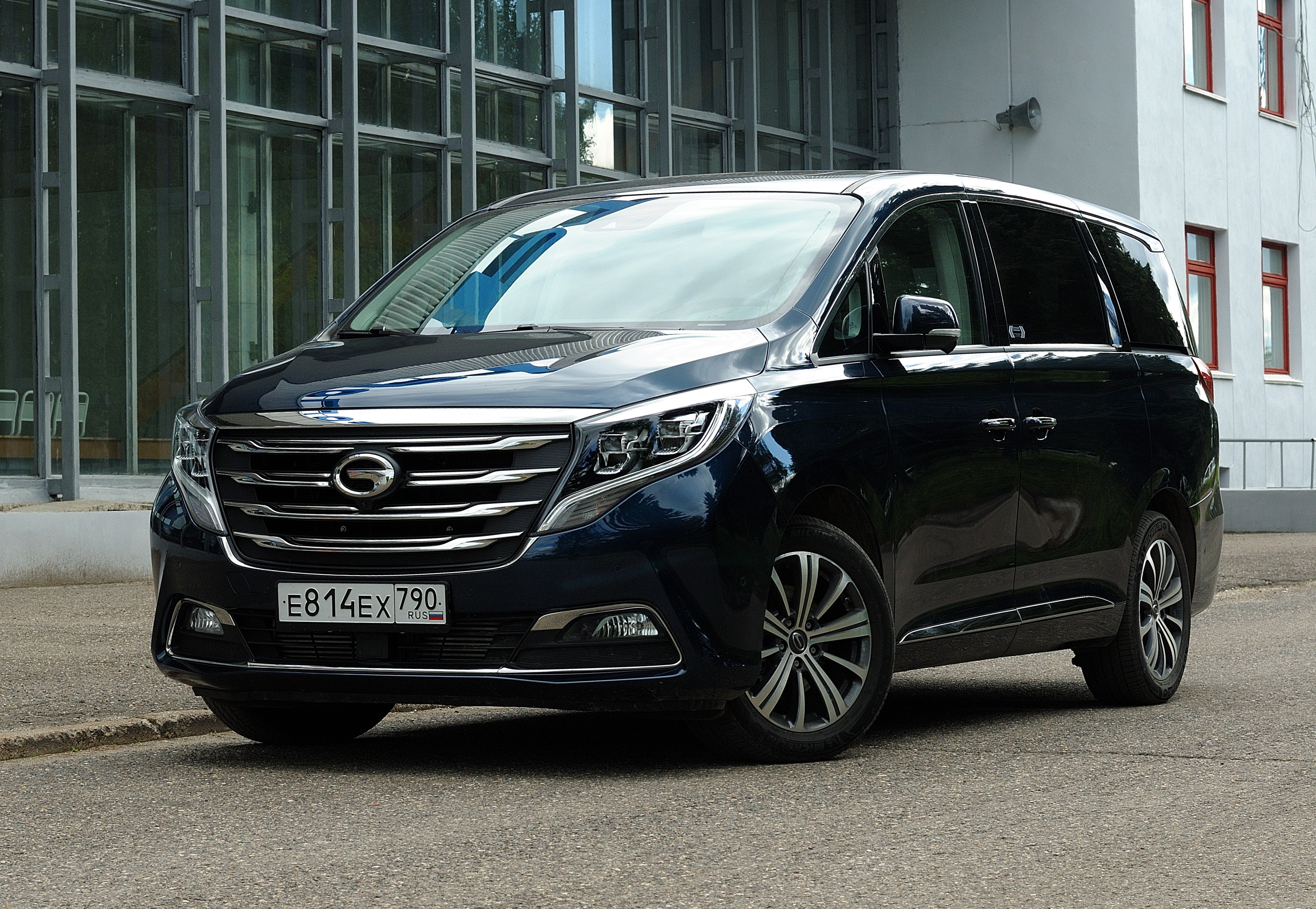
GAC GN8

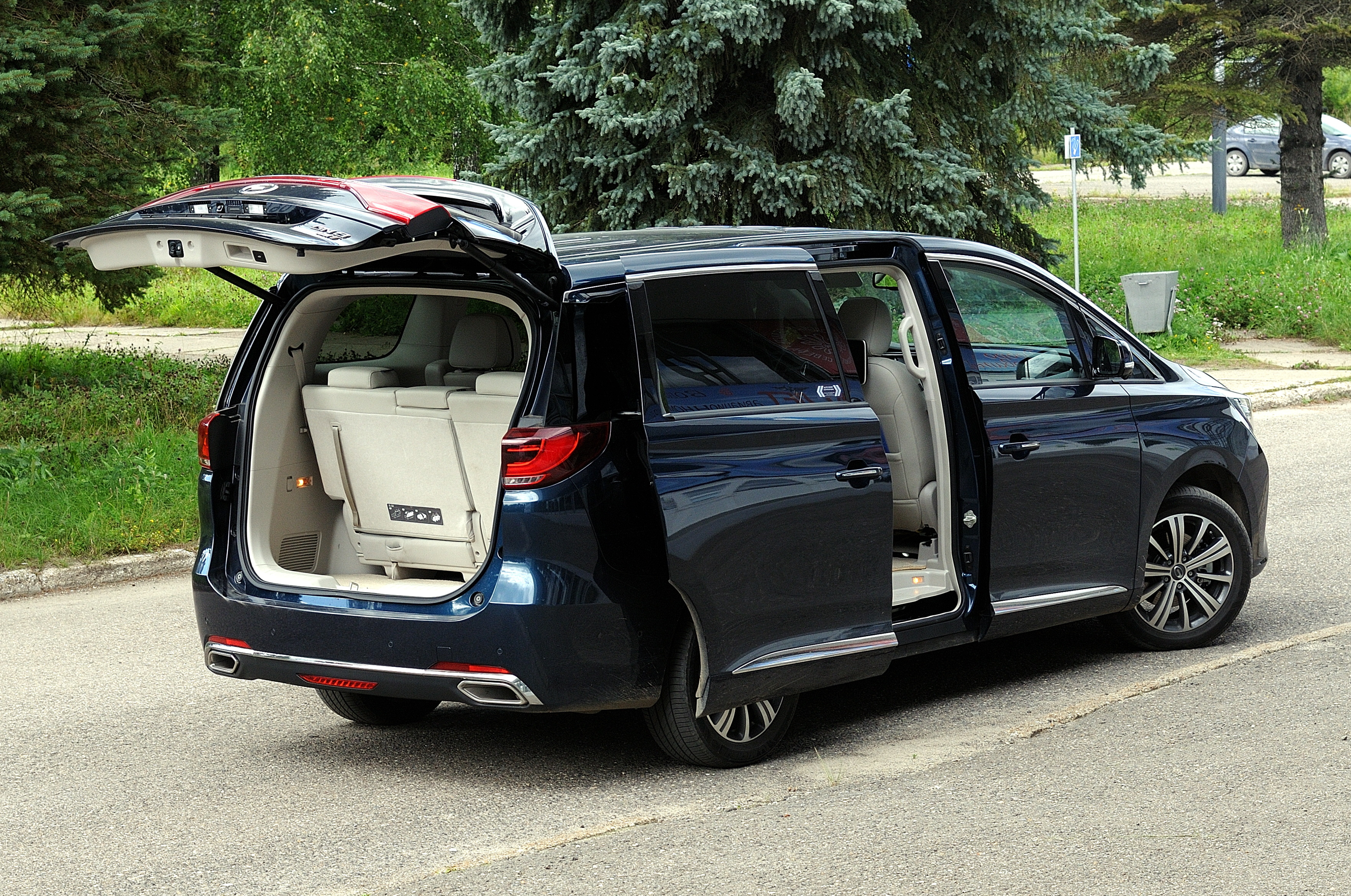
Rear view

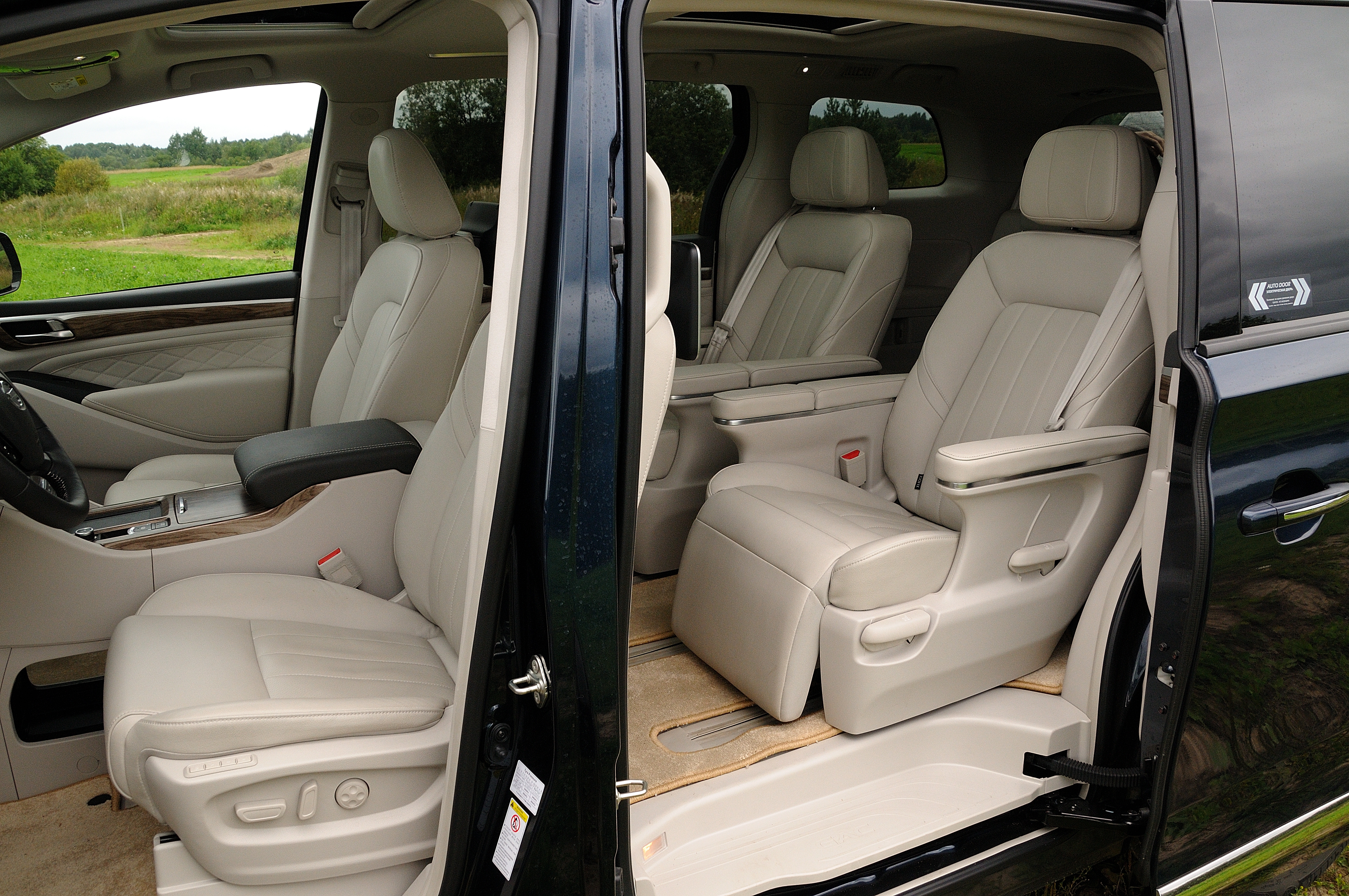
Seats view

=== Trumpchi GM8 Master Edition ===
As of early 2020, Trumpchi launched an upmarket and longer version of the current GM8 dubbed the Master Edition. The more upmarket Master Edition variant has a more pronounced snout than the regular GM8 and features a longer vehicle length with all the length added on the rear overhang.

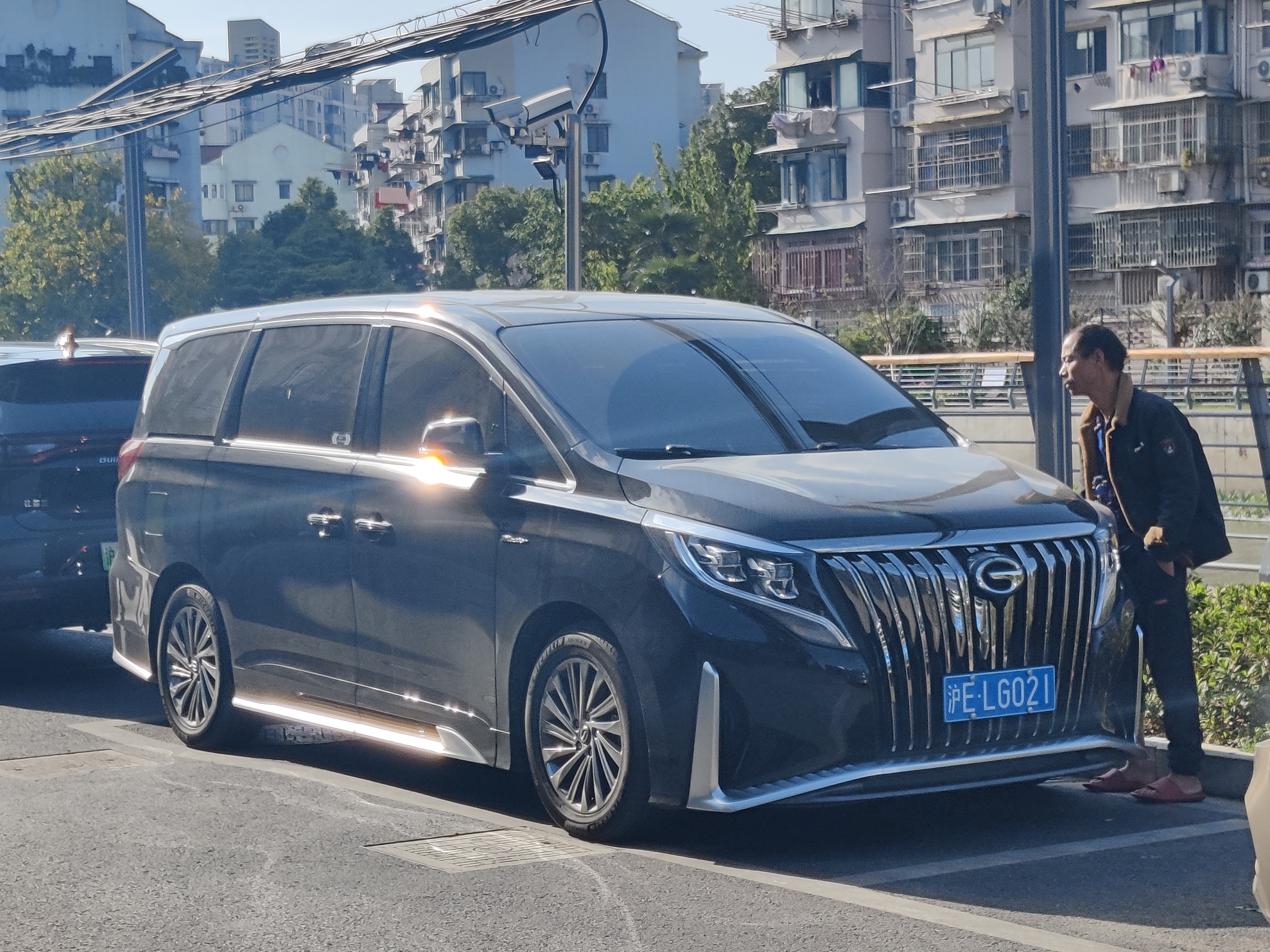
Trumpchi GM8 Master Edition

=== Trumpchi M8 rename ===
A facelift for the 2021 model year features styling updates as well as a name change and price drop was revealed during the 2020 Beijing Auto Show in September 2020. The updated model was renamed to Trumpchi M8 to differentiate from the more expensive pre-facelift model. The facelift design was based on the Master Edition and became 23 mm (0.91 in) longer than the pre-facelift model and is therefore 5,089 mm long, 1,884 mm wide and 1,822 mm tall with a 3-meter-long wheelbase. The updated Master Edition is 5,156 mm long. The facelift model features restyled instrumental panel, steering wheel and touch-enabled climate control interface. The gear switch was moved on top of the tunnel, and the diagonal size of the central display was increased. The engine remains the same unit while the transmission is an eight-speed Aisin transmission, and only front-wheel-drive in available.

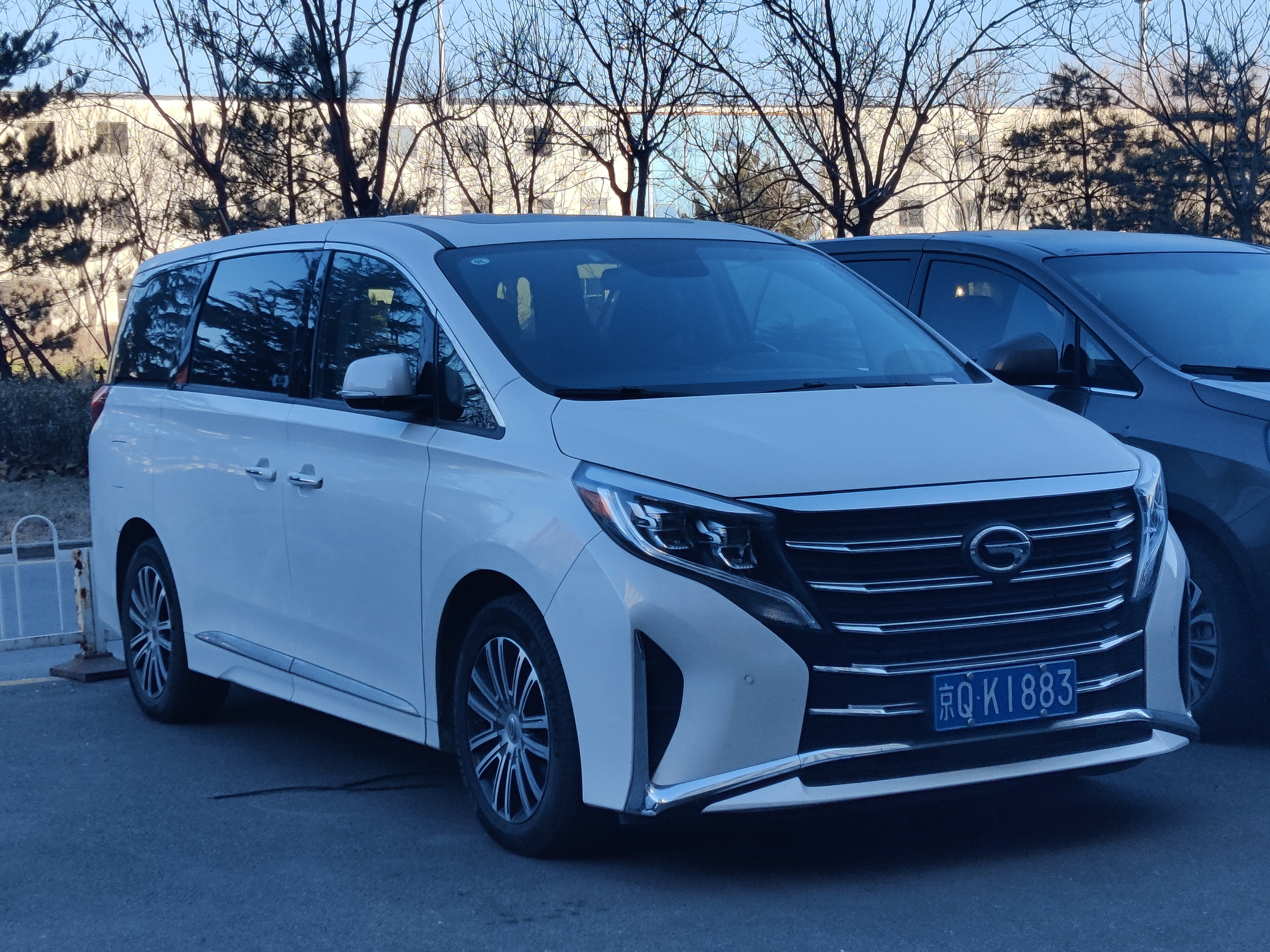
Trumpchi M8

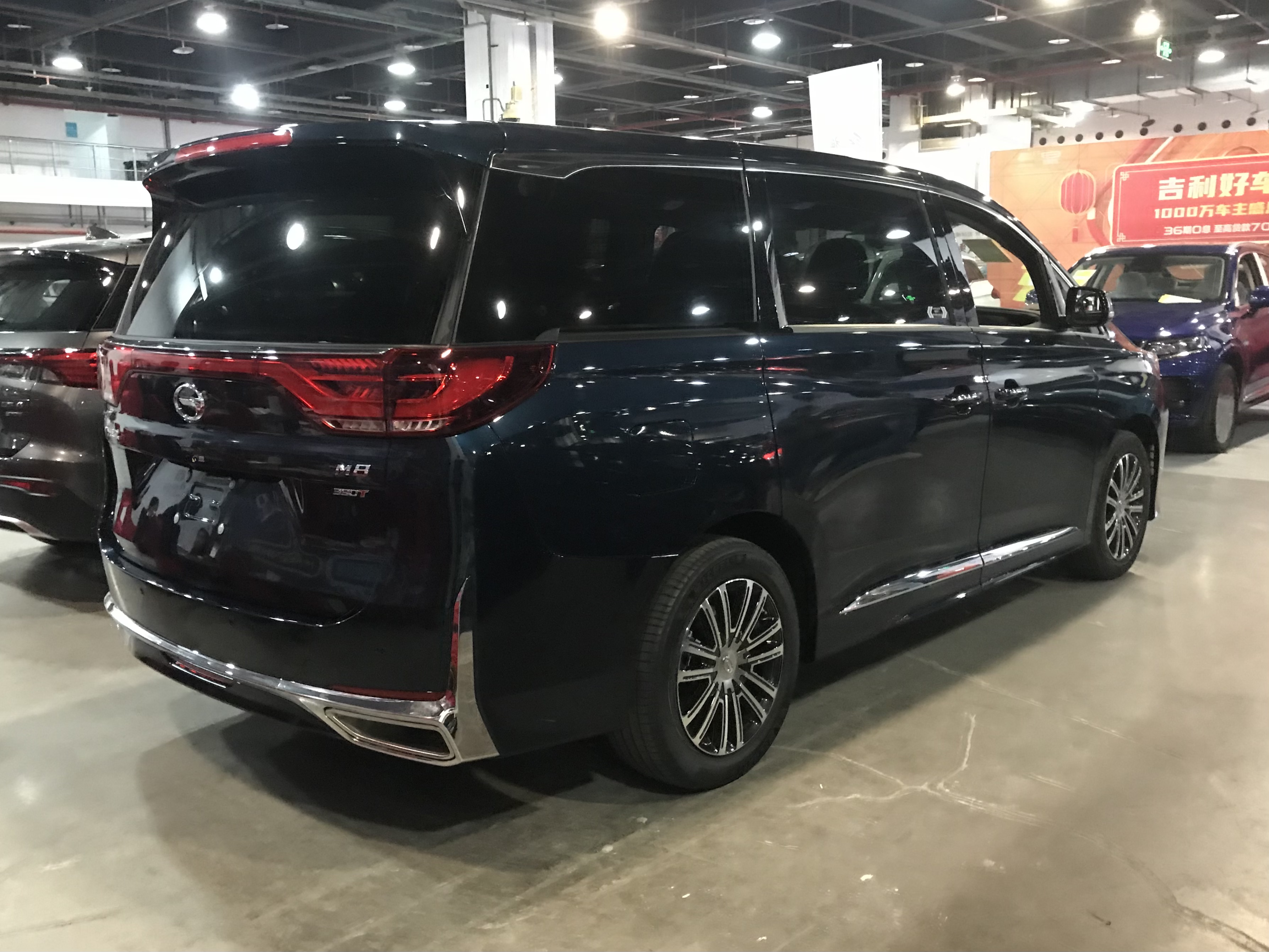
Rear view

=== Powertrain ===
Specs
Model	Engine	Years	Transmission	Power	Torque	0–100 km/h (0–62 mph) (Official)	Top speed
M8	2.0 L (1991cc) I4 (turbo petrol)	2017–2022	6-speed DCT	148 kW (201 PS; 198 hp) at 5,200 rpm	320 N⋅m (236 lb⋅ft) at 1,750–4,000 rpm	12.0s	190 km/h (118 mph)
M8	2.0 L (1991cc) I4 (turbo petrol)	2020–2025	8-speed automatic	185 kW (252 PS; 248 hp) at 5,250 rpm	390 N⋅m (288 lb⋅ft) at 1,750–4,000 rpm		

== Second generation (2022) ==
Second generation
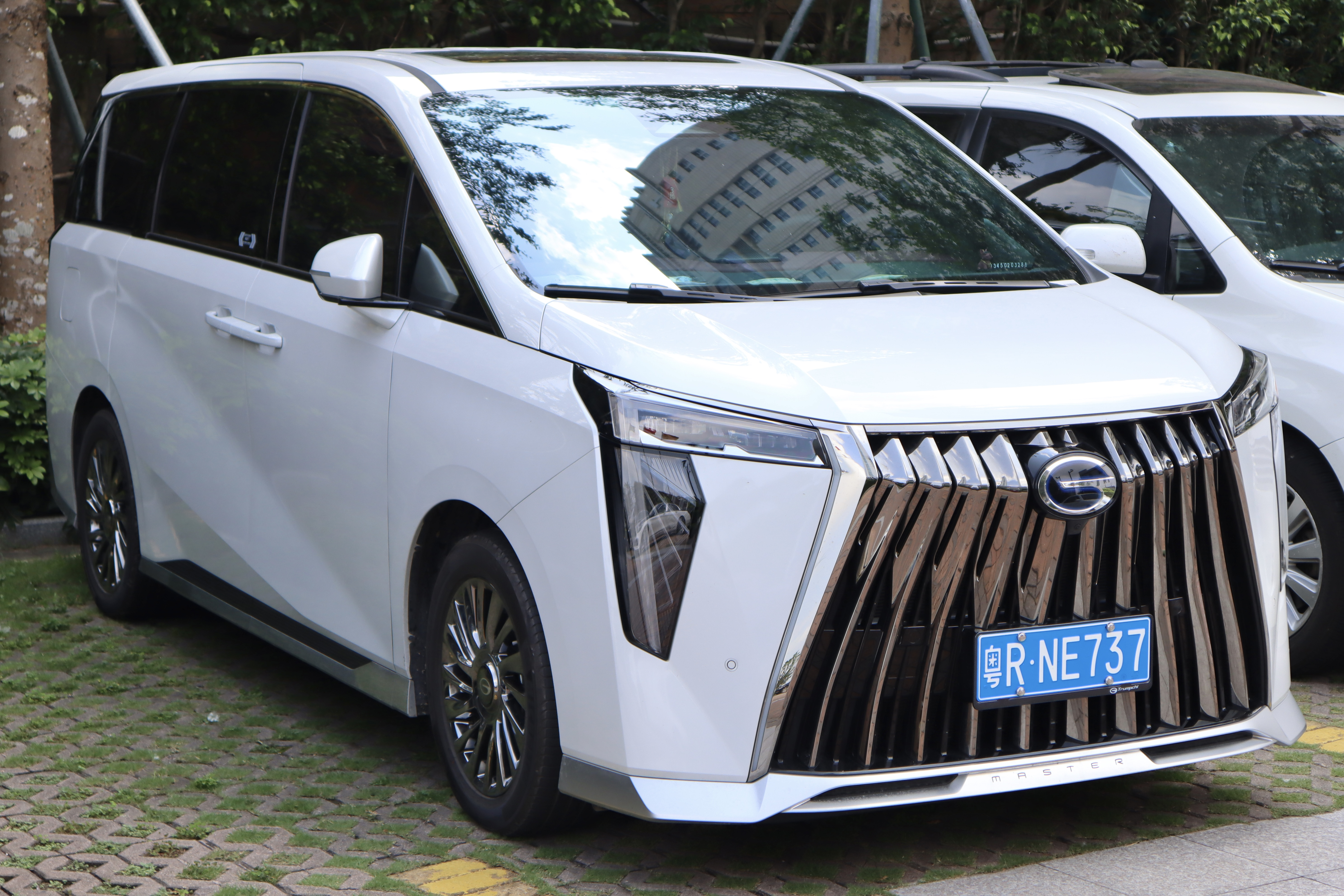

Overview
- Also called: Trumpchi E9 / GAC E9 (PHEV); Trumpchi Xiangwang M8; GAC GN8 (PHEV, Latin America, Philippines and Thailand); GAC M8 (PHEV, Southeast Asia, South Africa and Australia); GAC E8 (HEV, Philippines)
- Production: 2022–present
- Designer: Zihao Huang

Powertrain
- Engine: Petrol: 2.0 L 4B20J1 turbo I4; Petrol Hybrid: 2.0 L 4B20J2 turbo I4
- Power output: 185 kW (252 PS; 248 hp) (M8); 174 kW (237 PS; 233 hp) (M8 Hybrid); 274 kW (373 PS; 367 hp) (E9)
- Transmission: 8-speed Aisin AWF8F35 automatic; Toyota e-CVT; 2-speed DHT

Dimensions
- Wheelbase: 3,070 mm (120.9 in)
- Length: 5,212 mm (205.2 in)
- Width: 1,893 mm (74.5 in)
- Height: 1,823 mm (71.8 in)
- Kerb weight: 2,060–2,245 kg (4,542–4,949 lb)

The second generation Trumpchi M8 debuted during the 2022 Chengdu Auto Show with a fuel engine version, a Mega Waves mild hybrid (HEV) version and PHEV (Plug-in Hybrid Electric Vehicle) variant. The second generation model petrol version gets a new 2.0-litre turbo engine with 251 hp and 380 Nm. The hybrid variant gets a 190 hp 2.0-litre turbo engine produced by Guangzhou Qisheng Powertrain Co., Ltd. with an electric motor adopting the fourth-generation enhanced THS II Toyota hybrid system. Gearbox options include a CVT and an 8-speed automatic transmission.

The interior of the second-generation Trumpchi M8 adopts a 12.3-inch combined driving control instrument plus a 14.6-inch large suspended central control panel, with a new three-spoke multi-function steering wheel design.

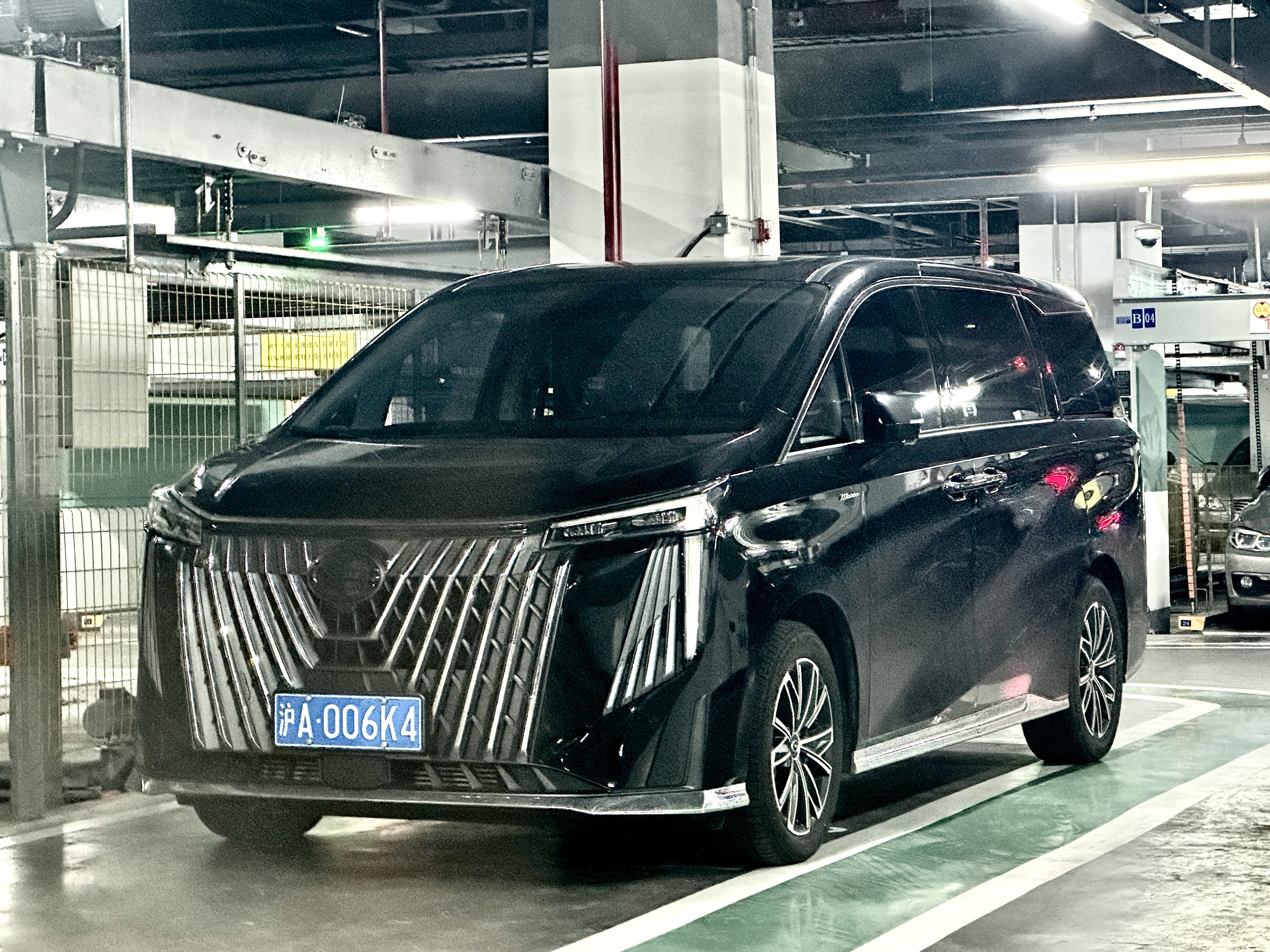
Trumpchi M8 II Master (大师)

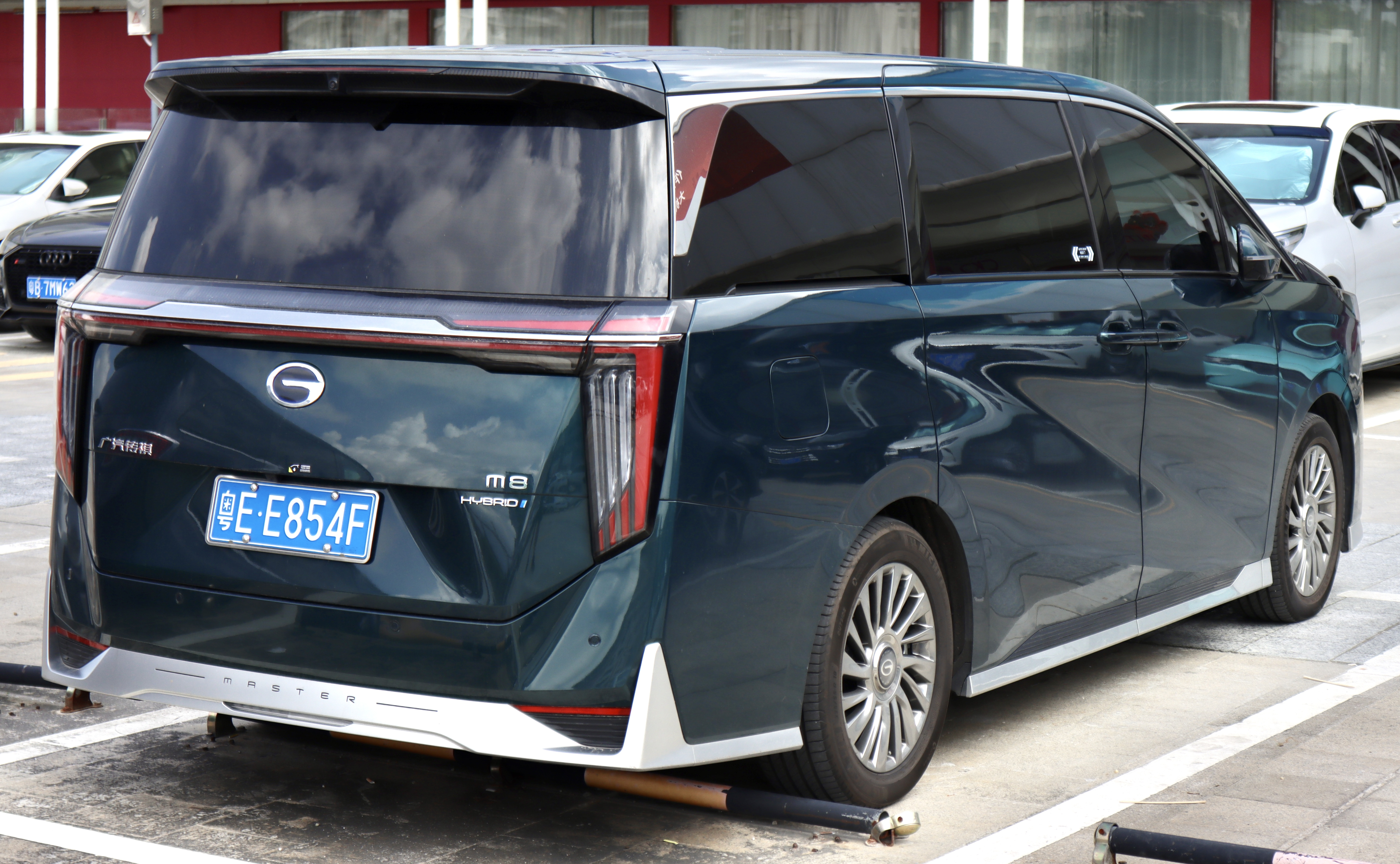
Rear view

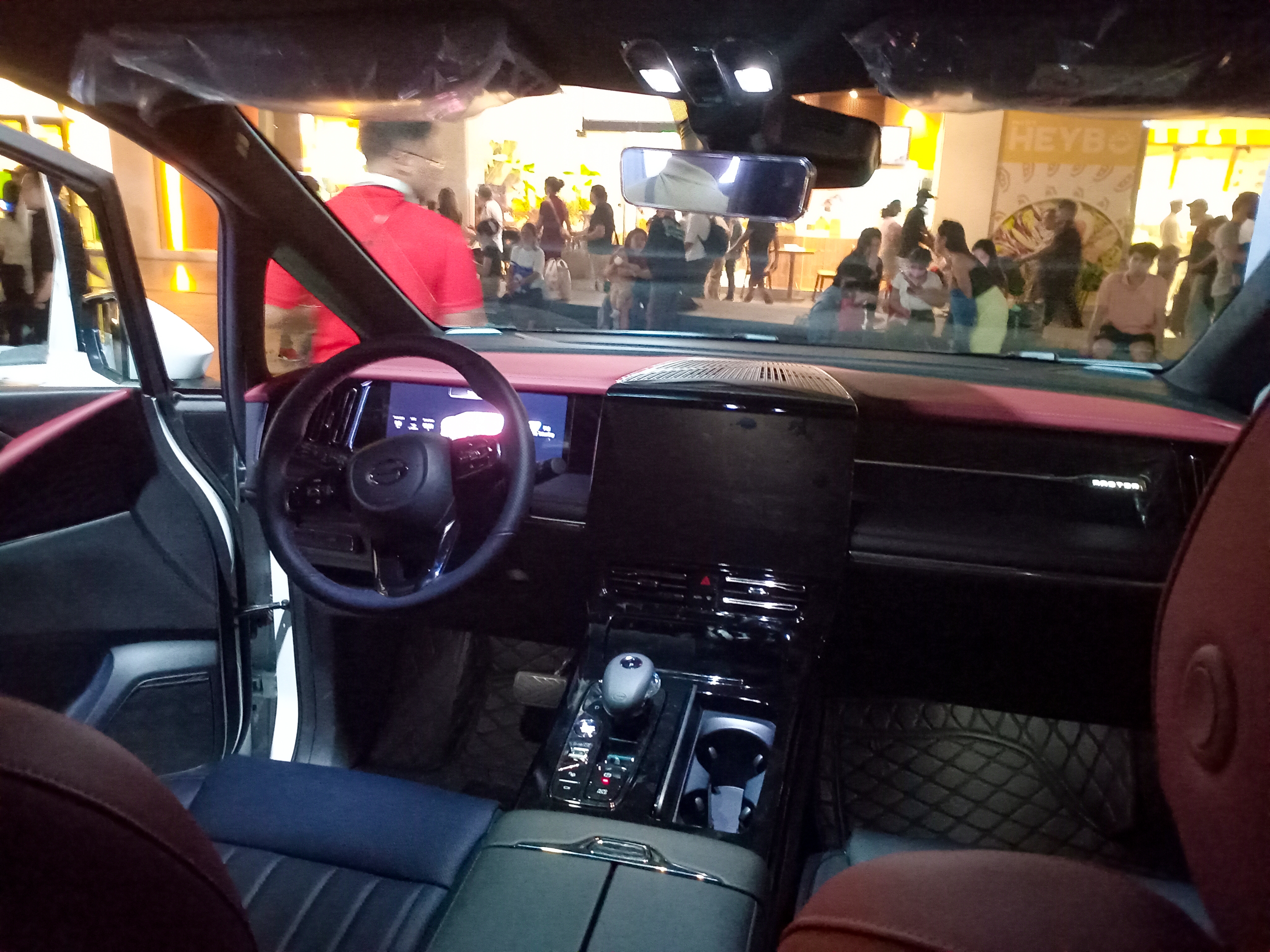
Interior

=== Trumpchi E9 ===
Launched in 2023, the Trumpchi E9 is the plug-in hybrid variant of the second generation Trumpchi M8. The Trumpchi E9 weighs 2.42-tons and the powertrain features a 2.0-litre turbocharged inline-4 petrol engine producing 188 hp and 330 Nm of torque. The engine is combined with an electric motor producing 180 hp and 300 Nm of torque while mated to a two-speed Dedicated Hybrid Transmission (DHT). The combined power output is 367 hp and 630 Nm enabling a 0–100 km/h acceleration time of 8.8 seconds. The E9 also has a Master Edition, in which its styling is virtually the same as the M8 Master.

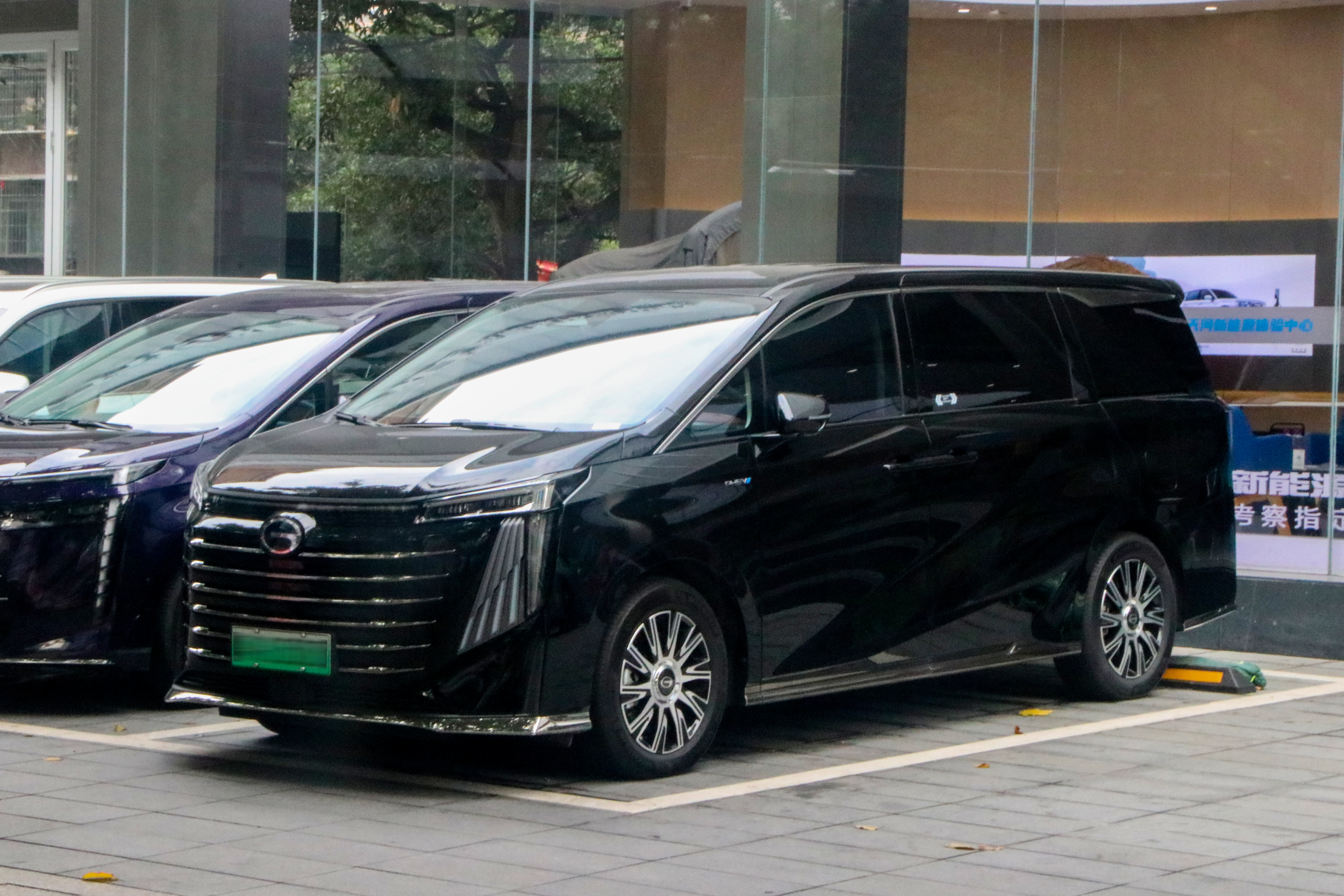
Trumpchi E9 Pro

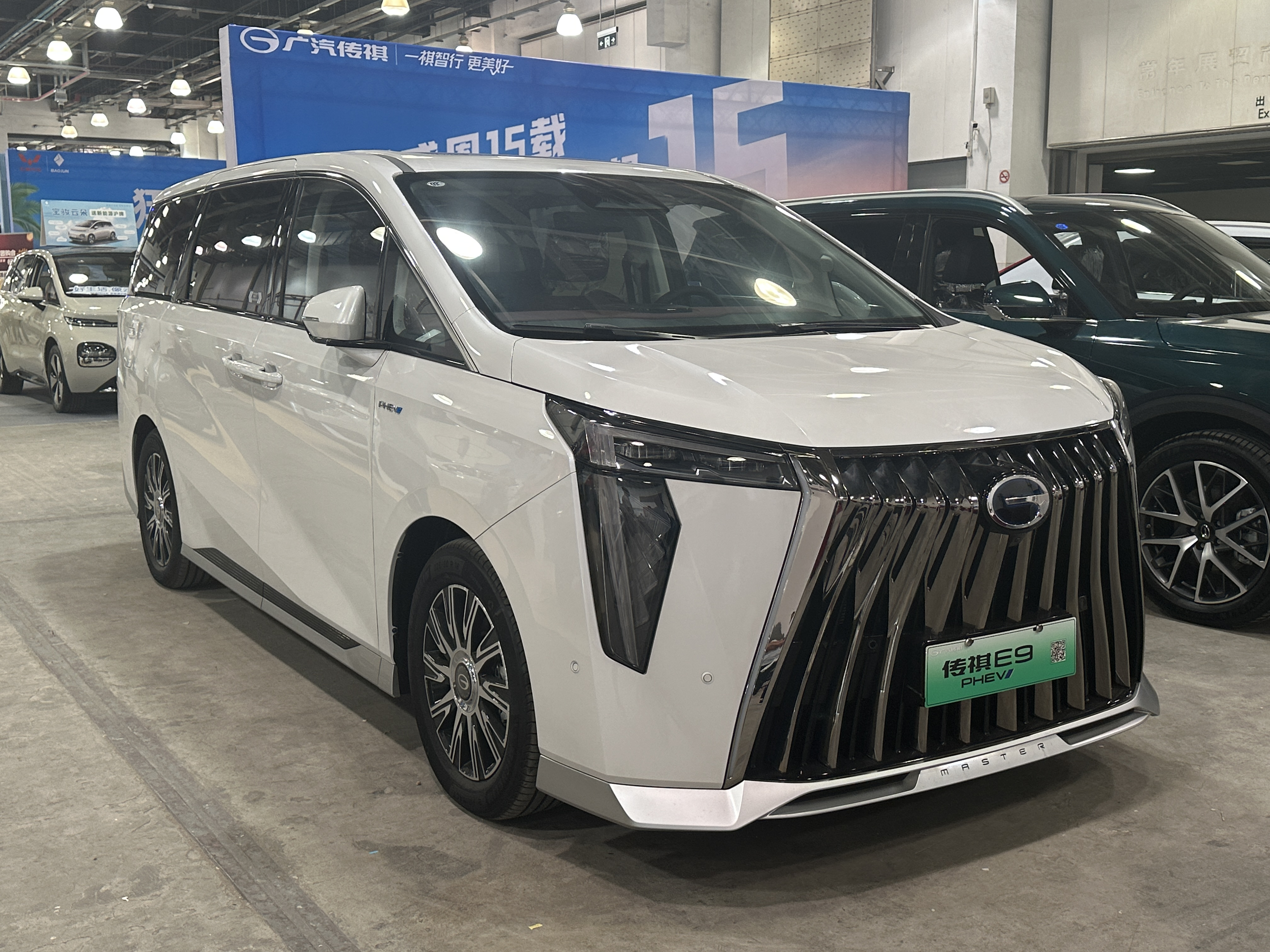
Trumpchi E9 Master Edition

=== Powertrain ===
Specs
Model	Engine	Transmission	Power	Torque	Top speed
Petrol
M8	2.0 L (1991cc) I4 (turbo petrol)	8-speed automatic	185 kW (252 PS; 248 hp) at 5,250 rpm	400 N⋅m (295 lb⋅ft) at 1,750–4,000 rpm	200 km/h (124 mph)
Hybrid
M8 HEV	2.0 L (1991cc) I4 (turbo petrol)	E-CVT	174 kW (237 PS; 233 hp)	391 N⋅m (288 lb⋅ft; 40 kg⋅m)	180 km/h (112 mph)
Plug-in Hybrid
E9 / GAC M8 PHEV	2.0 L (1991cc) I4 (turbo petrol)	2-speed DHT	274 kW (373 PS; 367 hp)	630 N⋅m (465 lb⋅ft)	170 km/h (106 mph)

=== Markets ===
==== Australia ====
The GAC M8 was launched in Australia on 18 November 2025, as part of GAC's entry to Australia, with two variants: Premium and Luxury powered by the 2.0-litre turbocharged petrol plug-in hybrid.

==== Brunei ====
The GAC M8 was launched in Brunei on 7 February 2026 alongside with the Emkoo, it is offered only in the sole PHEV variant powered by the 2.0-litre turbocharged petrol plug-in hybrid.

==== Malaysia ====
The GAC M8 went on sale in Malaysia on 27 October 2025, with two variants: Premium and Luxury, both are powered by the 2.0-litre turbocharged petrol plug-in hybrid.

==== Philippines ====
The GAC GN8 was launched in the Philippines alongside the GAC E8 on 29 July 2026. It is offered in the sole Executive variant powered by the 2.0-litre turbocharged petrol plug-in hybrid.

==== Singapore ====
The GAC E9 PHEV was launched in Singapore on 29 March 2025, with two variants: GL and GX powered by the 2.0-litre turbocharged petrol plug-in hybrid.

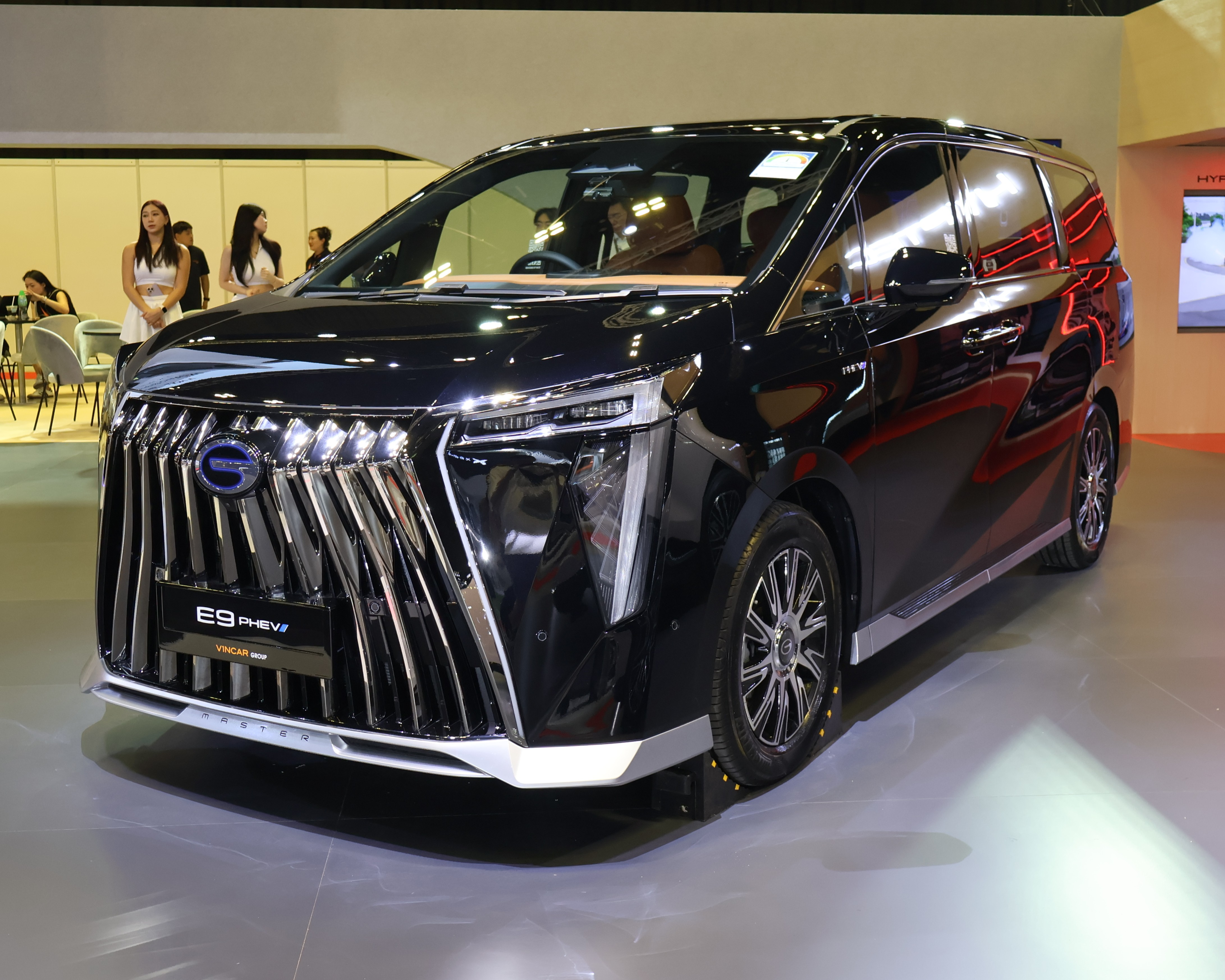
GAC E9 PHEV (Singapore)

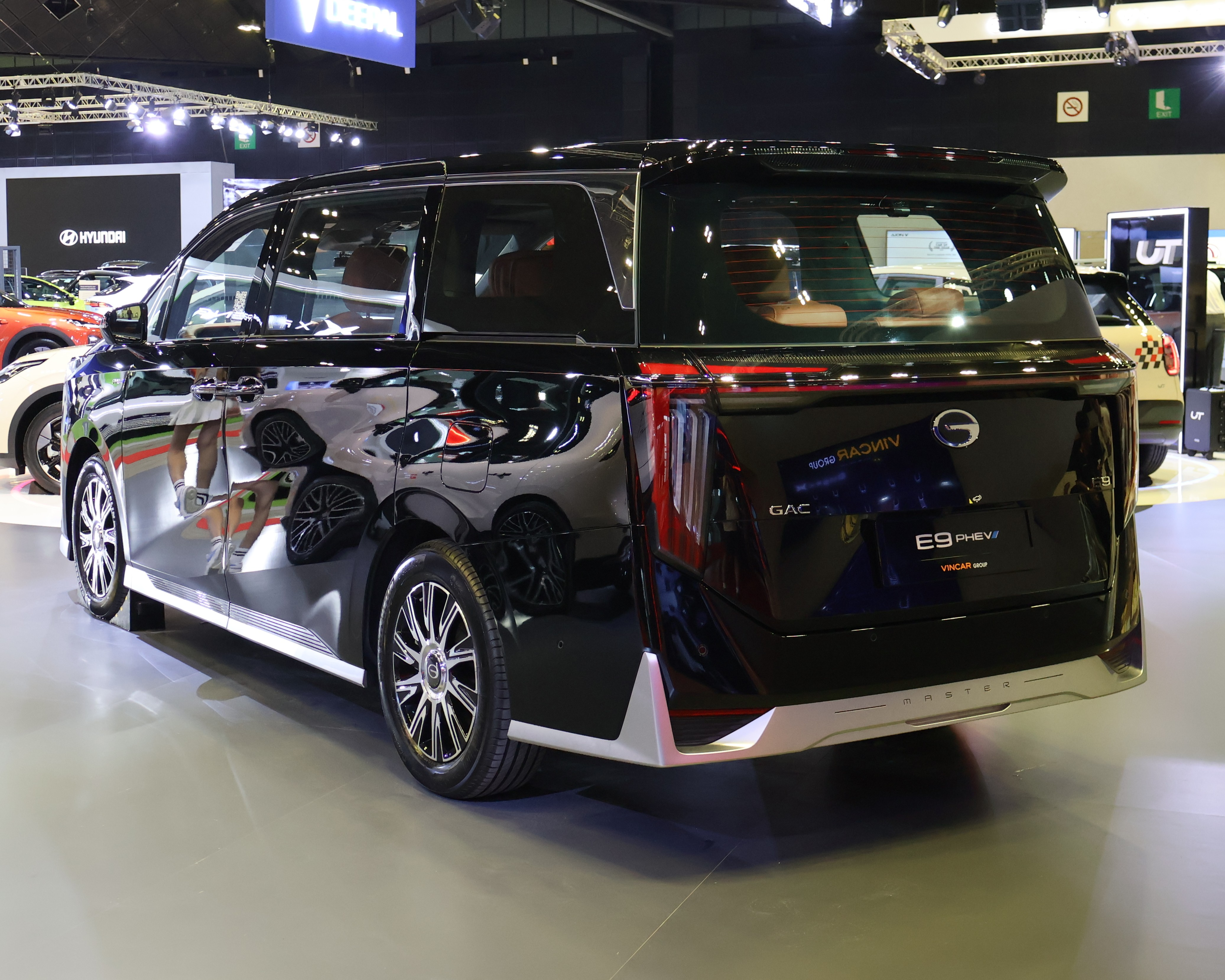
Rear view

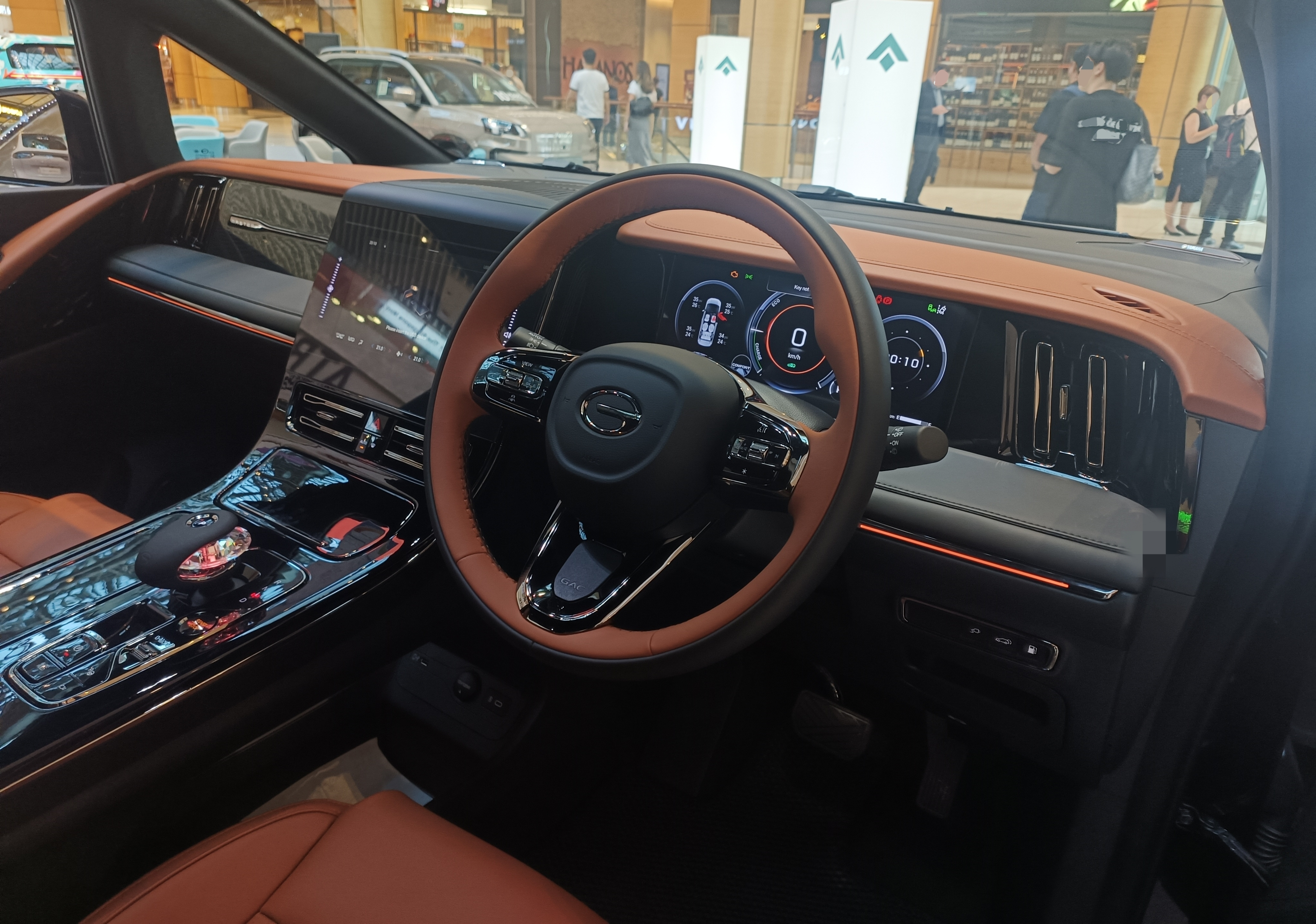
Interior

==== South Africa ====
The GAC M8 was launched in South Africa on 26 November 2025, in the sole Master variant powered by the 2.0-litre turbocharged petrol plug-in hybrid.

==== Thailand ====
The GAC M8 was launched in Thailand on 8 August 2025, in the sole PHEV variant powered by the 2.0-litre turbocharged petrol plug-in hybrid. In 3 August 2026, The GAC M8 was a renamed as GAC GN8.

== Sales ==
Year	China		
Year	M8	E9	Xiangwang M8
2023	83,869	15,061	—
2024	65,466	13,856	—
2025	49,113	4,590	4,063
