= Custody and repatriation =

1982–2003 administrative detention in PRC

Custody and repatriation (C&R; Chinese: 收容遣送; pinyin: shōuróng qiǎnsòng) was an administrative procedure, established in 1982 and abolished in 2003, by which the police in the People's Republic of China (usually cities) could detain people if they did not have a residence permit (hukou) or temporary living permit (zanzhuzheng), and return them to the place where they could legally live or work (usually rural areas). At times the requirement included possession of a valid national identity card. The system was abolished in 2003 after the death of Sun Zhigang, a migrant worker who died from physical abuse while being detained under the C&R system in Guangzhou.

== Background ==
In China there were reported to be some 800 detention camps in 2000 (not including Beijing), and by then several million people had been through them. As well as migrant workers, the Chinese camps usually contained vagrants, beggars, petitioners, and criminals, and the police (Public Security Bureau) earned income by this traffic and sometimes workers' unpaid labor. Often the detentions were unfairly long.

== History ==
The ostensible reason for the C&R regulation in 1982 in China was to ameliorate the situation of people in the cities who were beggars or homeless. Originally it applied to "three withouts persons", those with "no fixed place of residence, no means of livelihood and no permits to live in the city in question" but later it was applied in 1991 to others without just the residence or work permits. It built on a 1961 party directive implementing the hukou system of residence (traditional family registers found in several Asian countries), work permits (issued by police on behalf of work units or employers) to prevent uncontrolled population movements, as passports and visas do internationally, and Resident Identity Cards. In turn, this regulation extended older rules that were used to enforce extrajudicial movements of Nationalist troops away from liberated cities. But as the economic development of cities in the east later required increased domestic migrant workers, the regulations were not adequately adapted or were unfairly enforced, by the Public Security Bureau (police, supposed to be in charge of deportation) instead of the Ministry of Civil Affairs (supposed to be in charge of detention). These abuses became apparent in years before 2003 and there were internal and external warnings and discussion, with some improvements but little effect overall. There were some unpublicized deaths similar to what later occurred.

== Debate and abolition ==
The legal procedure of C&R for migrant workers was ended by the central government in 2003 after the death of Sun Zhigang, a migrant worker who died from physical abuse while being detained under the C&R system in Guangzhou.

In reaction to Sun's death, two groups of senior Chinese legal scholars wrote to the National People's Congress, questioning the constitutionality of the custody and repatriation regulation. One particular problem with the regulations was said to be that they had been adopted as regulations by the State Council and not as a law by the full Congress. As a result, it was argued, the C&R law for migrant workers was unconstitutional, on the grounds that it violated citizens' rights articles of the Constitution. As in many other countries, Chinese law does not provide for constitutional judicial review, and the legislature or administration instead of judges must change laws deemed unconstitutional. There has been some movement by legal reformers to use courts and bureaucracy to experiment with constitutionalism.

A similar argument was that the custody and repatriation regulations "violate the 1996 Administrative Punishment Law, which states that administrative punishments which restrict personal freedom may only be authorized by laws passed by the [full] Congress." Both criticisms echoed statements published in earlier years by lawyers and legal scholars.

In addition to the legal arguments, some reports by those with contact with the detention centers (including an official report) indicated that not only were the conditions worse than prisons or reeducation camps (including beatings and prolonged detentions without trial), but also sometimes the police used the system to kidnap and extort more than expenses from the families of the accused. These reports echoed earlier ignored warnings.

On 20 June 2003, Premier Wen Jiabao announced that the abolition of the custody and repatriation system, effective August 1. The detention centers would be replaced by service stations to care for poor beggars or homeless persons under the new Measures for Assisting Vagrants and Beggars with No Means of Support in Cities. The centers for vagrants are not allowed to collect fees from families nor require them to work. The legal system of hukou and residency and work permits for migrant workers was unchanged.

== See also ==
- Re-education through labor
- Law enforcement in China
- Constitution of China
