= Fiat Pratola Serra modular engines =

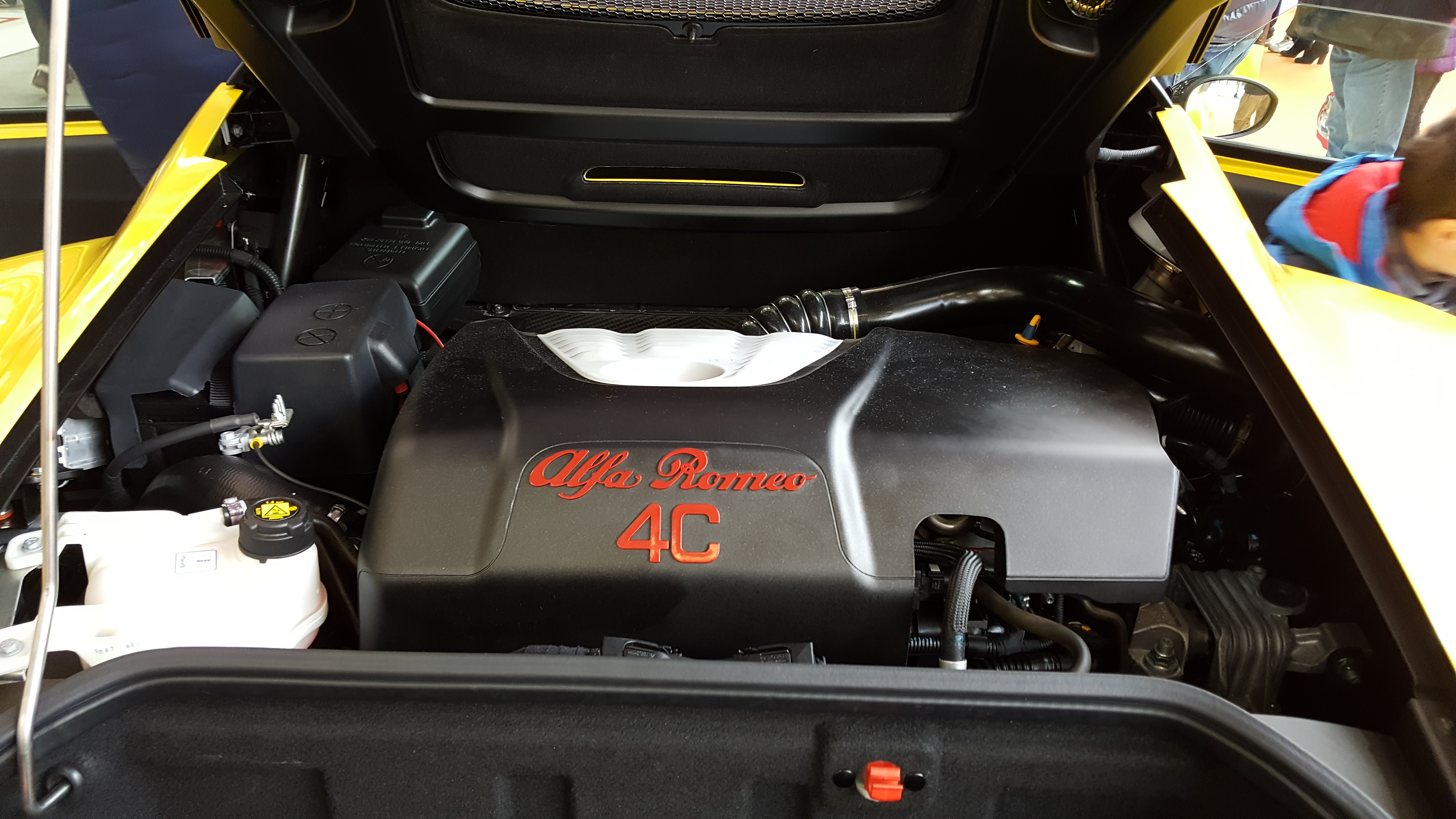

Overview
- Manufacturer: Fiat Auto (1994–2005); Fiat Powertrain Technologies (2005-2013); Fiat Group Automobiles (2013-2014); FCA Italy (2014-present)
- Also called: Family B engines (I4); Family C engines (I5); Fivetech (I5, South America)
- Production: 1994–present

Layout
- Configuration: Inline-4; Inline-5
- Displacement: 1.4–2.4 L (1,370–2,446 cc)
- Cylinder bore: 79.5 mm (3.13 in); 82 mm (3.23 in); 83 mm (3.27 in); 83.8 mm (3.30 in)
- Piston stroke: 64.87 mm (2.55 in); 75.65 mm (2.98 in); 82.7 mm (3.26 in); 80.5 mm (3.17 in); 90.4 mm (3.56 in); 91 mm (3.58 in); 99 mm (3.90 in)
- Cylinder block material: Cast iron Aluminium Alloy
- Cylinder head material: Aluminium Alloy
- Valvetrain: SOHC 2 or 3 valves x cyl. DOHC 4 valves x cyl. with VVT

Combustion
- Turbocharger: In some versions
- Fuel system: Common rail Direct injection Gasoline direct injection
- Fuel type: Petrol; Diesel
- Cooling system: Water-cooled

Output
- Power output: 105–240 PS (77–177 kW)

Chronology
- Predecessor: Fiat Twin Cam engine Fiat Torque engine
- Successor: FCA Global Medium Engine (for Alfa Romeo 1750 TBI engine)

The Fiat Pratola Serra modular engines (also known as family B engines for the 4-cylinder units, and family C engines for the 5-cylinder units) are a family of engines produced by the Fiat Group since 1994 and used in Fiat, Alfa Romeo, Lancia and Jeep vehicles. They are named after the Pratola Serra municipality in which they're being produced.

== Overview ==
This new engine family debuted with the Lancia Kappa, and were designed to allow the production of different units, both diesel and petrol, in various displacements and configurations while decreasing development and production costs thanks to the modular architecture.

Five cylinder launch versions:

Displacement	Bore x Stroke	Cycle	Note
2.0 L (1,998 cc)	82 mm × 75.65 mm (3.23 in × 2.98 in)	Otto	Naturally aspirated, variable valve timing
2.4 L (2,446 cc)	83 mm × 90.4 mm (3.27 in × 3.56 in)	Otto	Naturally aspirated, variable valve timing, variable-length intake manifold
2.4 L (2,387 cc)	82 mm × 90.4 mm (3.23 in × 3.56 in)	Diesel	Turbocharged

These engines are produced in the FGA's FMA (Fabbrica Motori Automobilistici) factory in Pratola Serra. It's an advanced factory, with a production capacity of 600,000 engines/year and producing both petrol and Diesel engines.

Started in 1993, it was developed to produce multiple engines with a single production line, sharing components between them.

In 2010 the Chinese GAC Group started production of 1.8 and 2.0 Alfa Romeo Twin Spark 16V configurations of the Pratola Serra modular engine branded as "VTML" in China. These engines constitute however unique configurations, mating the single spark plug cylinder head from the 1.8 16V VFD to the 1747 and 1970 Twin Spark engine blocks, the latter with balance shafts, while retaining the power levels of the Twin Spark 16V. While these engines have been phased out in the European market in favor of the 1.4 MultiAir Turbo gasoline engine, part of the smaller Fiat FIRE series, they have later been updated with dual variable valve timing (branded "DCVVT") and turbochargers, and are as of 2016 used in Trumpchi automobiles.

== Engine specifications ==
Engine blocks are produced in four- and five-cylinder versions with similar specs, usually made from cast iron, with five main bearings for the four cylinder versions and six main bearings for the five cylinder versions. Exceptions are the later version of the petrol 1.7 L (1,742 cc) and the diesel 2.1 L (2,143 cc) four-cylinder blocks, made from aluminum. They are developed to withstand turbocharging. Some versions have counter-rotating balance shafts to reduce vibrations. The aluminium pistons have graphite skirts to reduce internal engine friction.

Cylinder heads are made in aluminum alloy. Petrol versions have an integrated coolant pump and pentroof combustion chambers with an angle of 47° between valves. The turbodiesels have a different, flat combustion chamber design.

They usually have a DOHC valvetrain configuration with hydraulic tappets, driving four valves per cylinder. Exceptions are the 1.4 12V unit, also with hydraulic tappets but a SOHC valvetrain, driving three valves per cylinder, and the 1.9 8V and 2.4 10V turbodiesels, with a SOHC valvetrain with mechanical tappets, driving two valves per cylinder. The 1750 TBi gasoline and 16V Multijet diesel engines feature hydraulic tappets with roller rocker arms. Some versions feature variable valve timing (VVT). The camshafts are belt-driven.

In addition to VVT, some versions also feature variable-length intake manifold (VIS).

Earlier Alfa Romeo versions use the Twin Spark ignition system. There is also a version of the four cylinder 2.0 L (1,970 cc) block using direct injection, used only in Alfa Romeo's vehicles, dubbed as JTS.

In Brazil, the 5-cylinder petrol engines equipped the Marea sedan and station wagon (Marea Weekend) lines between 1998 and 2006, including a 2.0 20V with deactivated VVT (125 PS) for lower taxation, 2.0 20V VVT (140 PS), 2.4 20V with VVT and VIS (157 PS) and a turbocharged 2.0 20V (180 PS) — detuned from the 220 PS version from Fiat Coupé. A slightly updated version of the 2.4 20V was also used on the Stilo Abarth with 165 PS.

== Engine blocks ==
Displacement	Bore x Stroke	Cylinders	Cycle	Block alloy
1.4 L (1,370 cc)	82 mm × 64.87 mm (3.228 in × 2.554 in)	4	Otto	Cast iron
1.6 L (1,598 cc)	82 mm × 75.65 mm (3.228 in × 2.978 in)	4	Otto	Cast iron
1.7 L (1,742 cc)	83 mm × 80.5 mm (3.27 in × 3.17 in)	4	Otto	Early units: cast iron Later units: aluminum
1.7 L (1,747 cc)	82 mm × 82.7 mm (3.23 in × 3.26 in)	4	Otto	Cast iron
2.0 L (1,970 cc)	83 mm × 91 mm (3.3 in × 3.6 in)	4	Otto	Cast iron
1.6 L (1,598 cc)	79.5 mm × 80.5 mm (3.13 in × 3.17 in)	4	Diesel	Cast iron
1.9 L (1,910 cc)	82 mm × 90.4 mm (3.23 in × 3.56 in)	4	Diesel	Cast iron
2.0 L (1,956 cc)	83 mm × 90.4 mm (3.27 in × 3.56 in)	4	Diesel	Cast iron
2.0 L (1,998 cc)	82 mm × 75.65 mm (3.228 in × 2.978 in)	5	Otto	Cast iron
2.1 L (2,143 cc)	83 mm × 99 mm (3.3 in × 3.9 in)	4	Diesel	Aluminum
2.2 L (2,184 cc)	83.8 mm × 99 mm (3.30 in × 3.90 in)	4	Diesel	Cast iron
2.4 L (2,446 cc)	83 mm × 90.4 mm (3.27 in × 3.56 in)	5	Otto	Cast iron
2.4 L (2,387 cc)	82 mm × 90.4 mm (3.23 in × 3.56 in)	5	Diesel	Cast iron

== Current production ==
Displacement	Bore x Stroke	Cylinders	Cycle	Configuration	Power output
1.7 L (1,742 cc)	83 mm × 80.5 mm (3.27 in × 3.17 in)	4	Otto	16V DOHC, dual VVT, turbocharged, gasoline direct injection, aluminum block in later versions	240 PS (177 kW)
1.6 L (1,598 cc)	79.5 mm × 80.5 mm (3.13 in × 3.17 in)	4	Diesel	16V DOHC, turbocharged, Multijet II common-rail injection	105–120 PS (77–88 kW)
2.0 L (1,956 cc)	83 mm × 90.4 mm (3.27 in × 3.56 in)	4	Diesel	16V DOHC, turbocharged, Multijet II common-rail injection	135–170 PS (99–125 kW)
2.1 L (2,143 cc)	83 mm × 99 mm (3.3 in × 3.9 in)	4	Diesel	16V DOHC, turbocharged, Multijet II common-rail injection, aluminum block	135–210 PS (99–154 kW)
2.2 L (2,184 cc)	83.8 mm × 99 mm (3.30 in × 3.90 in)	4	Diesel	16V DOHC, turbocharged, Multijet II common-rail injection	185–200 PS (136–147 kW)

== Fiat applications ==
Petrol units	Type	Vehicles
1.4 L (1,370 cc)	1.4 12V	Bravo I, Brava, Marea
1.7 L (1,747 cc)	1.8 16V 115 PS (85 kW)	Bravo I, Brava, Marea
1.7 L (1,747 cc)	1.8 16V 131 PS (96 kW) VFD	Punto II HGT, Barchetta, Coupé, Stilo, Brava HGT (South America)
2.0 L (1,998 cc)	2.0 20V 125 to 155 PS (92 to 114 kW)	Bravo I, Marea, Coupé
2.0 L (1,998 cc)	2.0 20V Turbo 180 to 220 PS (132 to 162 kW)	Marea (South America), Coupé
2.4 L (2,446 cc)	2.4 20V 157 to 165 PS (115 to 121 kW)	Marea (South America), Stilo Abarth
Diesel units	Type	Vehicles
1.6 L (1,598 cc)	1.6 Multijet/Multijet II 16V	Grande Punto, Bravo II, Doblò, Linea, 500L, 500X, Tipo
1.9 L (1,910 cc)	1.9 D/TD/JTD/Multijet 8V/16V	Bravo I, Brava, Marea, Multipla, Palio, Strada, Punto, Stilo, Doblò, Idea, Grande Punto, Sedici, Bravo II
2.0 L (1,956 cc)	2.0 Multijet/Multijet II 16V	Bravo II, Sedici, Freemont, Doblò, Ducato
2.2 L (2,184 cc)	2.2 Multijet III 16V	Scudo (k0), Ducato
2.4 L (2,387 cc)	2.4 TD/JTD/Multijet 10V/20V	Marea, Croma

== Lancia applications ==
Petrol units	Type	Vehicles
1.4 L (1,370 cc)	1.4 12V	Ypsilon
1.7 L (1,742 cc)	1.8 Di T-Jet 16V	Delta III
1.7 L (1,747 cc)	1.8 16V 131 PS (96 kW) VFD	Dedra, Delta II, Lybra
2.0 L (1,998 cc)	2.0 20V	Kappa, Lybra, Thesis
2.4 L (2,446 cc)	2.4 20V	Kappa, Lybra (Protecta), Thesis
Diesel units	Type	Vehicles
1.6 L (1,598 cc)	1.6 Multijet 16V	Musa, Delta III
1.9 L (1,910 cc)	1.9 JTD/Multijet 8V/16V	Lybra, Musa, Delta III (twinturbo)
2.0 L (1,956 cc)	2.0 Multijet 16V	Delta III
2.4 L (2,387 cc)	2.4 TD/JTD/Multijet 10V/20V	Kappa, Lybra, Thesis

== Alfa Romeo applications ==
Petrol units	Type	Vehicles
1.4 L (1,370 cc)	1.4 Twin Spark 16V	145, 146
1.6 L (1,598 cc)	1.6 Twin Spark 16V Eco 105 hp (78 kW)	147
1.6 L (1,598 cc)	1.6 Twin Spark 16V 120 hp (89 kW)	155, 145, 146, 156, 147
1.7 L (1,742 cc)	1750 TBi	159, 4C, Giulietta, Brera, Nuova Spider
1.7 L (1,747 cc)	1.8 Twin Spark 16V	155, 145, 146, GTV, Spider, 156, GT
2.0 L (1,970 cc)	2.0 Twin Spark 16V	155, 145, 146, GTV, Spider, 156, 166, 147
2.0 L (1,970 cc)	2.0 JTS	GTV, Spider, 156, GT
Diesel units	Type	Vehicles
1.6 L (1,598 cc)	1.6 JTDm/JTDm2 16V	Mito, Giulietta, Tonale
1.9 L (1,910 cc)	1.9 JTD/JTDm 8V/16V	145, 146, 156, 147, GT, 159
2.0 L (1,956 cc)	2.0 JTDm/JTDm2 16V	159, Brera, Spider, Giulietta
2.1 L (2,143 cc)	2.2 JTDm2 16V	Giulia, Stelvio
2.4 L (2,387 cc)	2.4 JTD/JTDm 10V/20V	166, 156, 159, Brera, Nuova Spider

== Jeep applications ==
Diesel units	Type	Vehicles
1.6 L (1,598 cc)	1.6 Multijet II 16V	Renegade (BU)
2.0 L (1,956 cc)	2.0 Multijet 16V	Cherokee (KL), Renegade (BU)
2.1 L (2,143 cc)	2.2 Multijet II 16V	Wrangler (JL)
2.2 L (2,184 cc)	2.2 Multijet II 16V	Cherokee (KL)

== Applications in other brands ==
Petrol units	Type	Vehicles
1.6 L (1,598 cc)	1.6 16V DCVVT	Trumpchi GA3/GA3S, Trumpchi GA5, Trumpchi GA6
1.7 L (1,747 cc)	1.8 16V DCVVT	Trumpchi GA5, Trumpchi GA6, Trumpchi GS5 Super
2.0 L (1,970 cc)	2.0 16V DCVVT	Trumpchi GA5, Trumpchi GS5 Super
Diesel units	Type	Vehicles
1.6 L (1,598 cc)	1.6 Common Rail	Opel Combo D
1.9 L (1,910 cc)	1.9 Common Rail	Opel Zafira, Saab 9-3, Cadillac BLS
2.0 L (1,956 cc)	2.0 Common Rail	Opel Astra, Opel Insignia, MG Hector, Tata Harrier, Tata Safari
2.2 L (2,284 cc)	2.2 Common Rail	Citroen Jumpy, Opel Vivaro/Zafira Life

== See also ==
- Alfa Romeo Twin Cam engine
- Alfa Romeo Twin Spark engine
- Fiat Twin Cam engine
- Fully Integrated Robotised Engine
- JTD engine
