= GA5 =

GA5, GA-5, or GA 5 may refer to:

- Georgia State Route 5, a state highway in Georgia, United States
- Georgia's 5th congressional district, congressional district in Georgia, United States
- Trumpchi GA5, a 2010–2018 Chinese compact sedan
