= Pratola =

Pratola may refer to several places in Italy:

- Pratola Peligna, a municipality in the Province of L'Aquila, Abruzzo
- Pratola Serra, a municipality in the Province of Avellino, Campania
- Pratola Ponte, a locality of Pomigliano d'Arco (NA), Campania
