= Trumpchi GA5 =

Chinese compact sedan

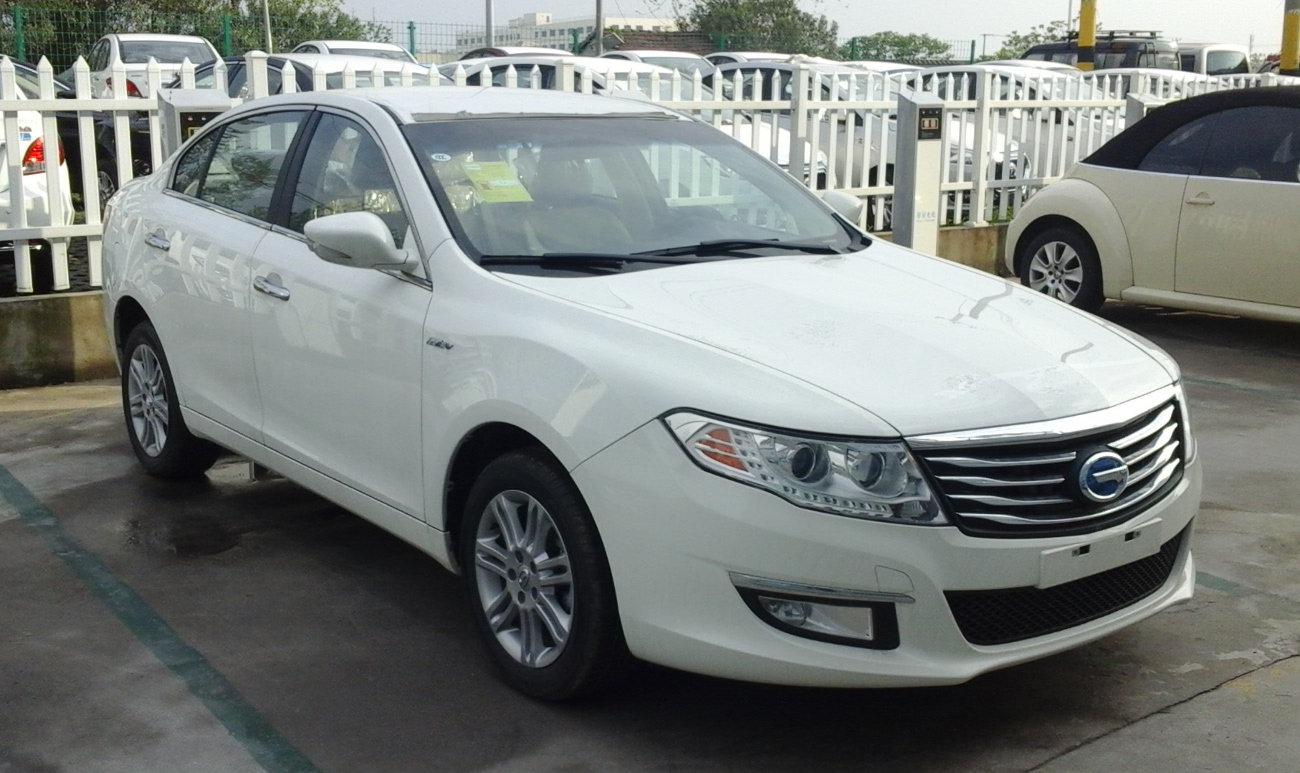
- Trumpchi GA5 REV

Overview
- Manufacturer: GAC Group
- Also called: Trumpchi GA5 REV; Trumpchi GA5 PHEV; Guangzhou Auto Trumpchi
- Production: 2010–2018
- Model years: 2011–2018

Body and chassis
- Class: Large family car (D)
- Body style: 4-door sedan
- Layout: Front-engine, front-wheel-drive
- Related: Alfa Romeo 166

Powertrain
- Engine: 1.6 L I4 (gasoline); 1.6 L 4B16M1 Turbo I4 (gasoline); 1.8 L I4 (gasoline); 1.8 L I4 (turbo gasoline); 2.0 L I4 (gasoline); REV; 1.0 L GA465QED I4 (gasoline)
- Electric motor: 31 kW (42.1 PS; 41.6 hp) Permanent magnet synchronous moto
- Power output: 45 kW (61.2 PS; 60.3 hp) (petrol engine) + Electric motor
- Transmission: 5-speed manual; 5-speed automatic
- Hybrid drivetrain: PHEV

Dimensions
- Wheelbase: 2,710 mm (106.7 in)
- Length: 4,800 mm (189.0 in)
- Width: 1,819 mm (71.6 in)
- Height: 1,484 mm (58.4 in)

Chronology
- Successor: Trumpchi GA6

The Trumpchi GA5, or originally the Guangzhou Auto Trumpchi is a mid-size sedan produced by Guangzhou Automobile under the Trumpchi brand. It debuted at the 2010 Guangzhou Auto Show.

== Overview ==
In 2009, Alfa Romeo had sold its 166/Kappa platform and tooling to Guangzhou Automobile (GAC), which formed the basis of the Trumpchi GA5 and Trumpchi GS5 crossover, using a FIAT/Alfa Romeo 2.0 engine and a manual, automatic or tiptronic transmission. Pricing ranges from 122,800 yuan to 189,800 yuan. The Trumpchi was launched as a brand and the brand expanded later with the Guangzhou Auto Trumpchi being renamed to Trumpchi GA5 by the end of 2012 along with the facelift.

As of 2014, the Trumpchi GA5 is powered by a 1.6-liter turbo engine mated to a 5-speed manual transmission or a 5-speed automatic transmission. The maximum engine power of the GA5 is 116.0kW with a maximum horsepower of 158PS and 216.0N·m.

== Trumpchi GA5 PHEV ==
The Trumpchi GA5 PHEV or Trumpchi GA5 REV is a plug-in hybrid EV based on the base Trumpchi GA5 sedan launched on the Chinese car market in 2015. The range extender of the Trumpchi GA5 REV is a 1.0-liter, 4-cylinder petrol engine producing 31 kW (42 hp) powering an electric motor with an output of 94 kW (126 hp) and generates 225 N.m (166 lb-ft) of torque. Top speed is 130km/h. The GA5 PHEV battery has a capacity of 13 kWh and has a nominal rating of 12 kWh, delivering a NEDC range of 70 km (44 miles). The 138 kg / 304 lb battery pack of the GAC Trumpchi GA5 has a total voltage of 350 V, and is guaranteed for 8 years or 150,000 km / 93,750 miles. Combined fuel consumption of the 2015 GAC Trumpchi GA5 based on the NEDC driving cycle is 1.6 L/km (2.56 L/100 mile). Based on the NEDC driving cycle the energy consumption of the 2015 GAC Trumpchi GA5 is 16 kWh/100km.

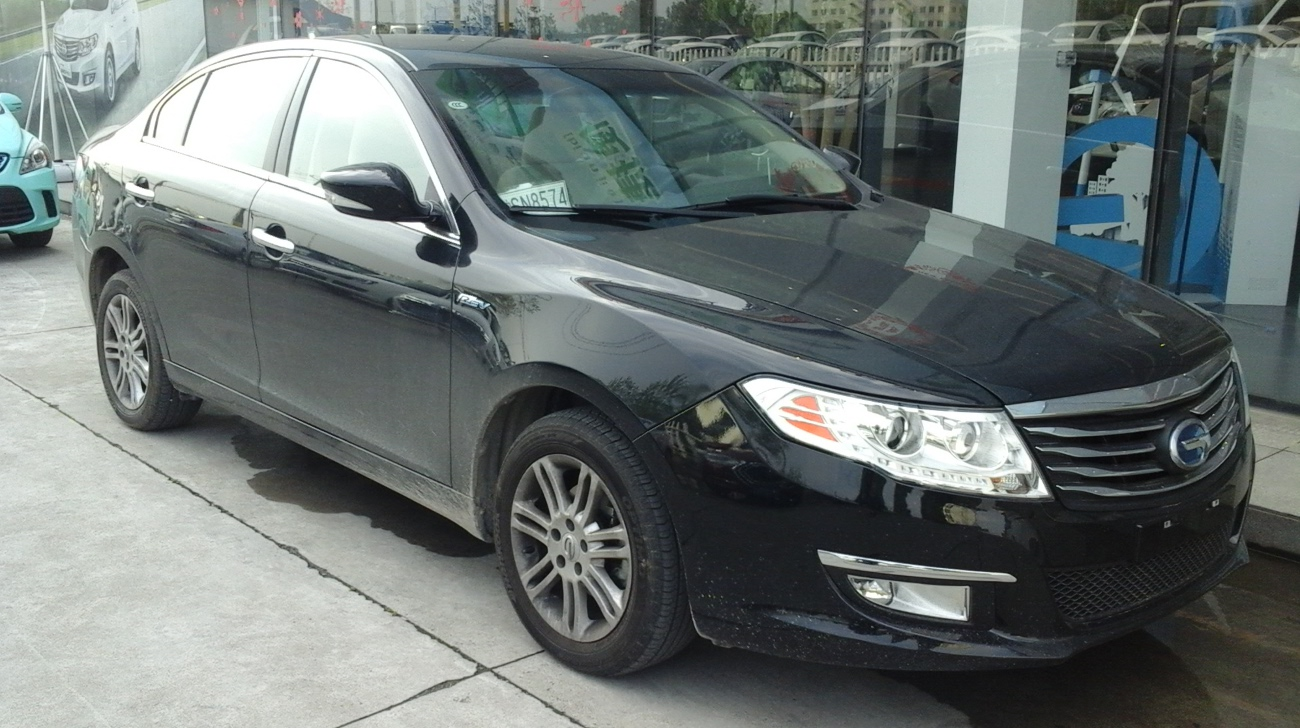
Trumpchi GA5 REV front.

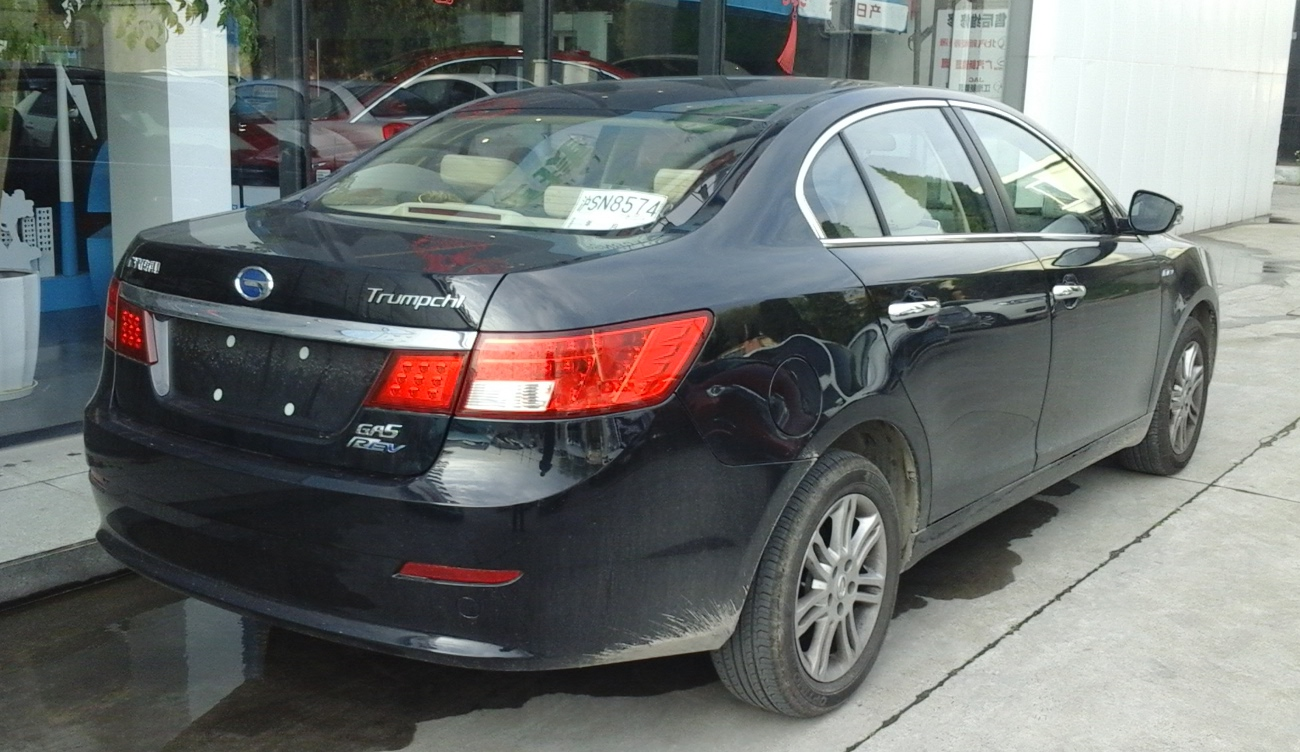
Trumpchi GA5 REV rear.

== See also ==
- List of GAC vehicles
