= Vincent Mauro =

Italian-American soccer referee (1943–2024)

- Born: October 23, 1943; Pratola Serra, Italy
- Died: June 15, 2024 (aged 80); Italy

Domestic
Years	League	Role
1972–1991	Various divisions of American soccer	Referee; Assistant referee

International
Years	League	Role
1985–1991	FIFA listed	Referee

Vincent Mauro (October 23, 1943 – June 15, 2024) was an Italian and American soccer referee who was listed on the FIFA International Referees List between 1985 and 1991.

== Career ==
Mauro was born in Pratola Serra, Campania, Italy, and emigrated to the United States in 1964, settling in Arlington, Massachusetts. He started his refereeing career in 1972 in youth leagues in Massachusetts and gradually ascended through the tournament system until being officialized in the American Soccer League. In 1985, he earned the FIFA badge.

Mauro was appointed to the 1987 FIFA World Youth Championship in Chile and to the men's tournament at the 1988 Summer Olympics in Seoul. That same year he was chosen to oversee matches at the Asian Cup in Qatar and in 1989 served as the American representative at the Copa América in Brazil, where he was an assistant referee in the final between Brazil and Uruguay at Maracanã Stadium, working with Chilean referee Hernán Silva. Mauro was fluent in English and Italian, as well as having learned French in high school and possessing basic knowledge in Spanish and Portuguese.

He was selected in May 1990 to represent the U.S. at the 1990 FIFA World Cup in his native Italy, where he served as both a referee and assistant referee. In the former position, he oversaw a single group stage game between Belgium and South Korea in Verona. As an assistant referee, Mauro worked with Argentine referee Juan Carlos Loustau in the West Germany vs Netherlands round of 16 match and with Mexican referee Edgardo Codesal in the Cameroon vs England quarterfinal in Naples.

After the 1990 FIFA World Cup, Mauro worked in the refereeing committees of New Jersey and New York as well as with other soccer leagues in the area. He returned to his native Italy in the mid-2000s, where he died on June 15, 2024, at the age of 80.
