= Alfa Romeo Bella =

Concept car designed by Bertone

Alfa Romeo 166 Bertone Bella
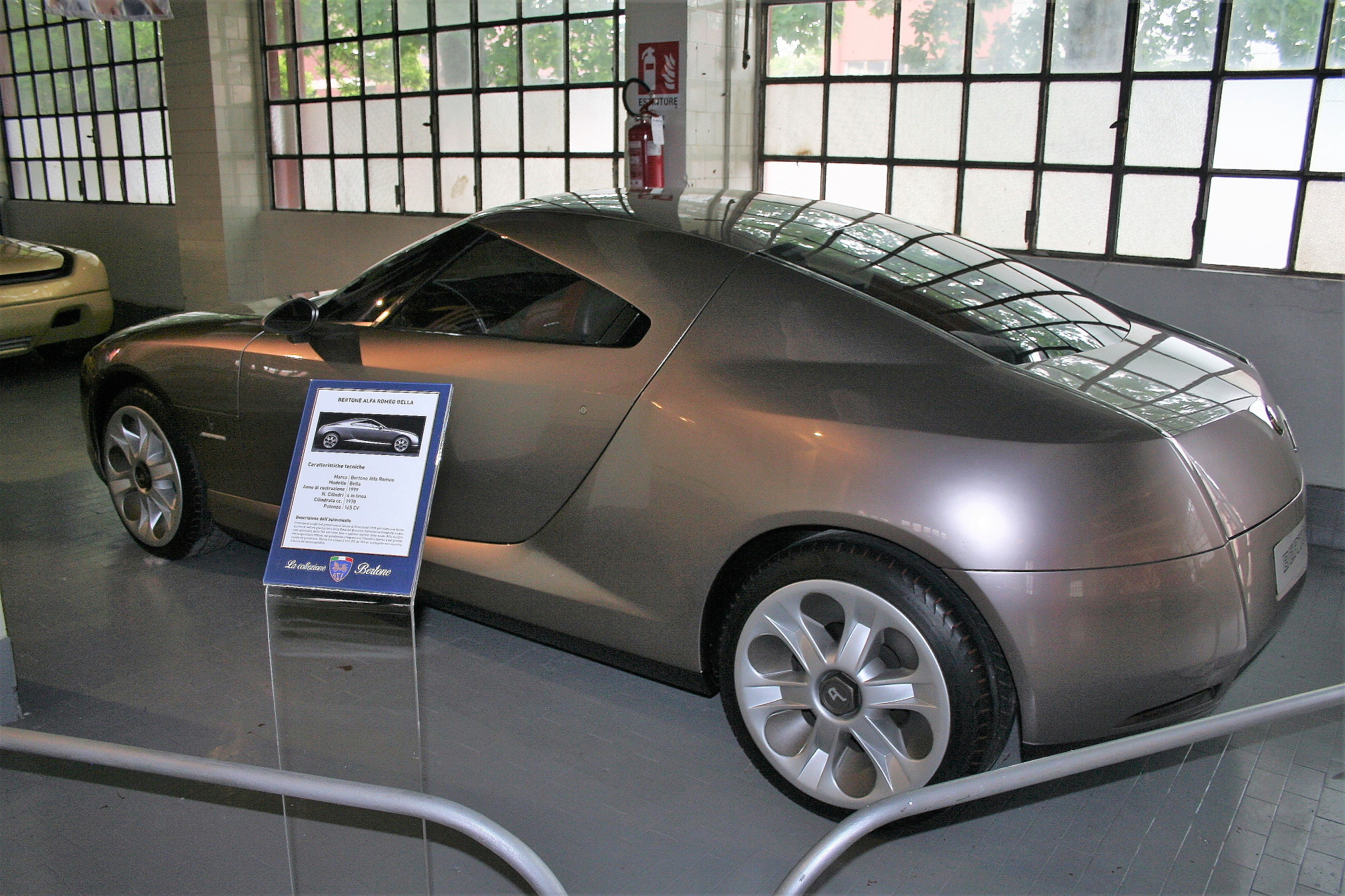

Overview
- Manufacturer: Alfa Romeo
- Production: 1999
- Assembly: Italy
- Designer: Luciano D'Ambrosio at Bertone

Body and chassis
- Class: Concept car
- Body style: 2-door coupé
- Platform: Alfa Romeo 166

Dimensions
- Length: 4,460 mm (175.6 in)
- Width: 1,910 mm (75.2 in)
- Height: 1,320 mm (52.0 in)

The Alfa Romeo Bella is a concept car built by Alfa Romeo in 1999. It was conceived as a possible coupé version of the Alfa Romeo 166, but a production version never appeared.

== Background ==
The Bella debuted at the Geneva Motor Show in 1999. The car's development was a collaboration between Alfa Romeo and Bertone. Based on the Alfa Romeo 166, it was built using a 2.0 L Twin Spark engine but would later receive a 3-liter Busso V6 engine producing 167.8 kW (225 hp).

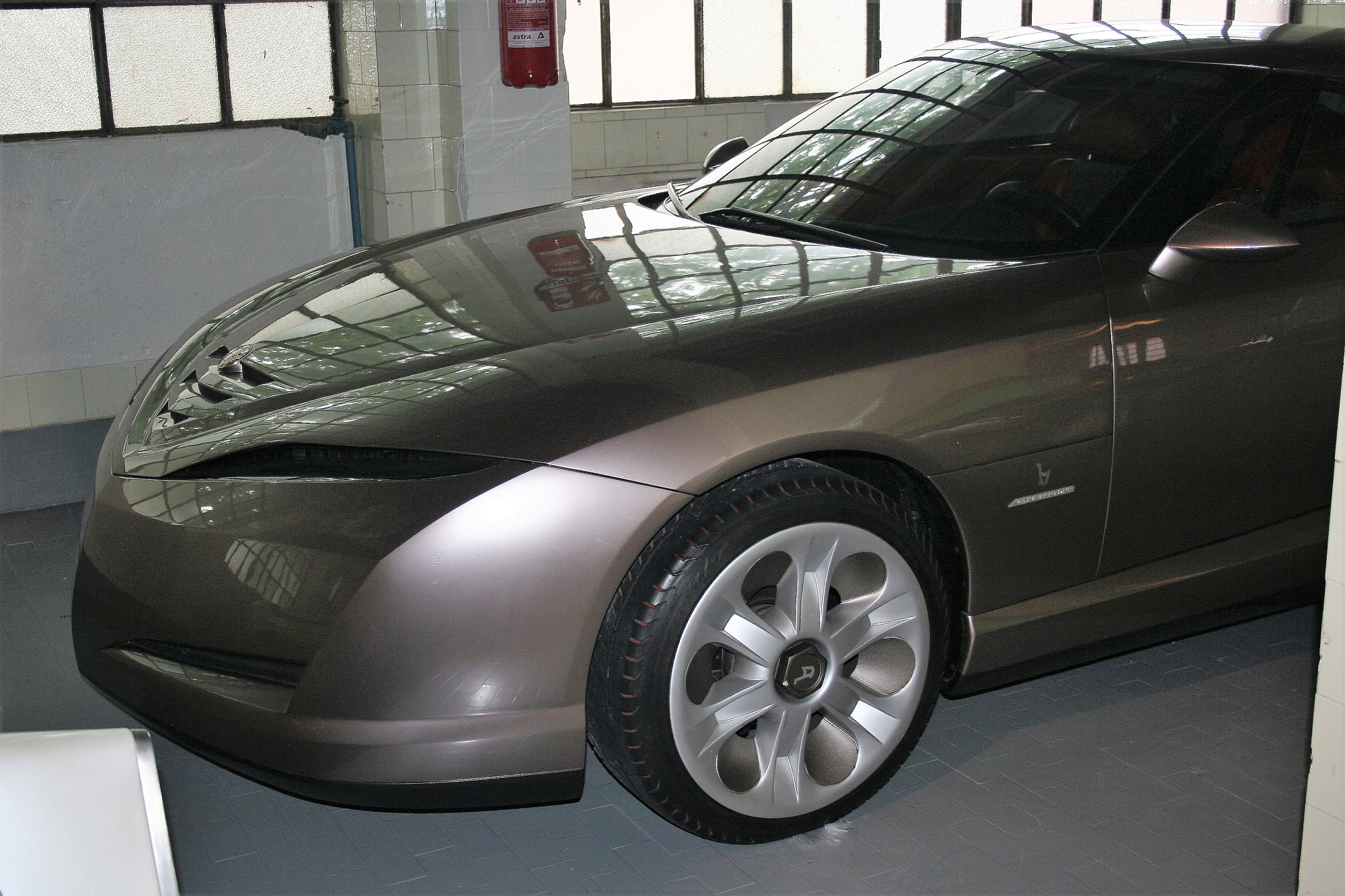
Bella front end

The car was a 2+2, but despite having 4 seats Bertone recognized that many 4-seat sports car owners use the rear seats as luggage space. In the Bella the rear armrest and seatbacks could be folded up to extend the trunk space into the cabin without spoiling the finished appearance of the cabin and concealing the items in the extended trunk.

The car's design was inspired by the Alfa Romeo scudetto, the shape of which seen in the car's hood and informs the rest of the shape. A vestigial trilobo can also be seen in the nose. The integration of the windshield with the side windows gives the cabin an aeronautical appearance.

The interior was trimmed in red leather with contrasting interior details in a metallic finish.
