= Pratola Serra =

- Comune
- Comune di Pratola Serra
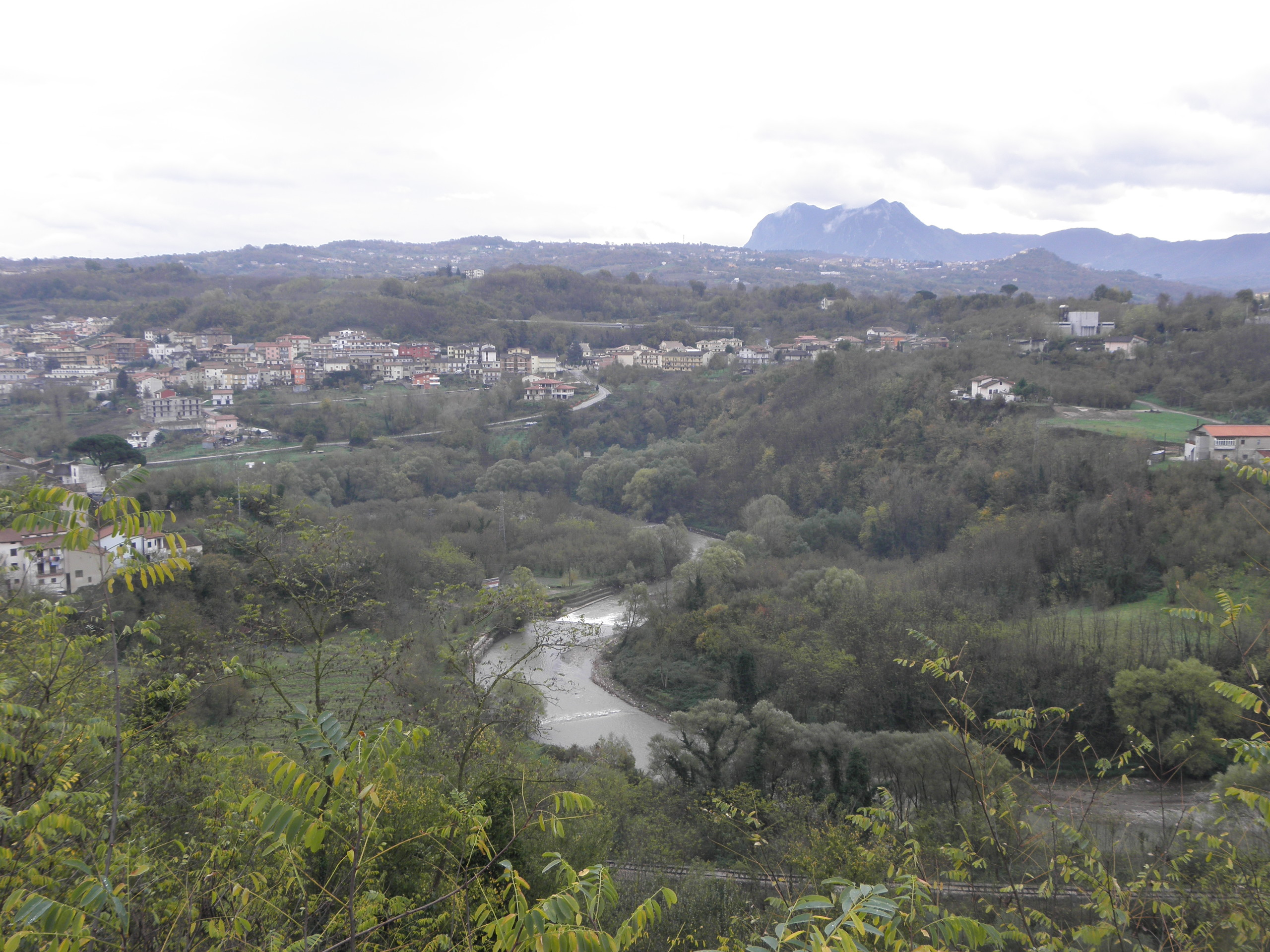
- Pratola Serra seen from Prata Principato Ultra

- Location within Italy Location within Campania
- Coordinates: 40°59′N 14°51′E
- Country: Italy
- Region: Campania
- Province: Avellino (AV)
- Frazioni: Serra di Pratola, San Michele di Pratola, Nocione, Acquaviva, Saudelle, Cocciacavallo

Government
  - Mayor: Gerardo Galdo

Area
  - Total: 8 km^{2} (3.1 sq mi)
- Elevation: 280 m (920 ft)

Population (31 December 2010)
  - Total: 3,700
  - Density: 460/km^{2} (1,200/sq mi)
- Demonym: Pratolani
- Time zone: UTC+1 (CET)
  - Summer (DST): UTC+2 (CEST)
- Postal code: 83039
- Dialing code: 0825
- ISTAT code: 064075
- Patron saint: Madonna Addolorata and San Gerardo
- Saint day: First Sunday in September
- Website: Official website

Pratola Serra is a town and comune in the province of Avellino, Campania, Italy.

The area of the comune spread on the right bank of the Sabato river. The oldest part of the comune is the village of Serra di Pratola that lie on a hill overlooking the Sabato river valley. The village of Pratola was born later stretching along a major road to Apulia. It lies in the valley and later has spread on the nearby hills. The comune was born in 1812 merging the two villages of Pratola and Serra. The village of Pratola since then has become the major town of the comune and it is the seat of the town hall.

A major FIAT engine plant is located in the town, with the town giving its name to a series of modular engines built there.

== Notable people ==
- Vincent Mauro (1943–2024), Italian-American FIFA football referee
