= Alfa Romeo 166 =

Executive car produced by Alfa Romeo

- 2005 Alfa Romeo 166 Twin Spark (facelift)

Overview
- Manufacturer: Alfa Romeo
- Model code: 936
- Production: 1996–2007
- Model years: 1999–2007
- Assembly: Italy: Rivalta, Turin (1998–2002); Mirafiori, Turin (2002–2007)
- Designer: Centro Stile Alfa Romeo: Walter de Silva; Daniele Gaglione (facelift)

Body and chassis
- Class: Executive car (E)
- Body style: 4-door saloon
- Layout: Front-engine, front-wheel-drive
- Platform: Type E
- Related: Lancia Kappa; Alfa Romeo Bella; Trumpchi GA5; Trumpchi GS5

Powertrain
- Engine: Petrol: 2.0 L Twin Spark 16V I4; 2.0 L Busso 12V turbo V6; 2.5 L Busso 24V V6; 3.0 L Busso 24V V6; 3.2 L Busso 24V V6; Diesel: 2.4 L JTD 20V turbo-diesel I5
- Transmission: 5/6-speed manual; 4-speed ZF Q-System automatic; 5-speed Aisin Sportronic automatic

Dimensions
- Wheelbase: 2,700 mm (106.3 in)
- Length: 4,720 mm (185.8 in)
- Width: 1,815 mm (71.5 in); 1,800 mm (70.9 in) (from 2003)
- Height: 1,416 mm (55.7 in)
- Kerb weight: 1,420–1,550 kg (3,130–3,420 lb)

Chronology
- Predecessor: Alfa Romeo 164

The Alfa Romeo 166 (Type 936) is an executive car produced by the Italian automaker Alfa Romeo, between 1996 and June 2007. It is a four-door saloon car with a front-engine, front-wheel-drive layout and replaced the 164 in the marque's model range. The car was designed by Centro Stile Alfa Romeo, under the control of Walter de Silva, and was facelifted in September 2003.

== History ==
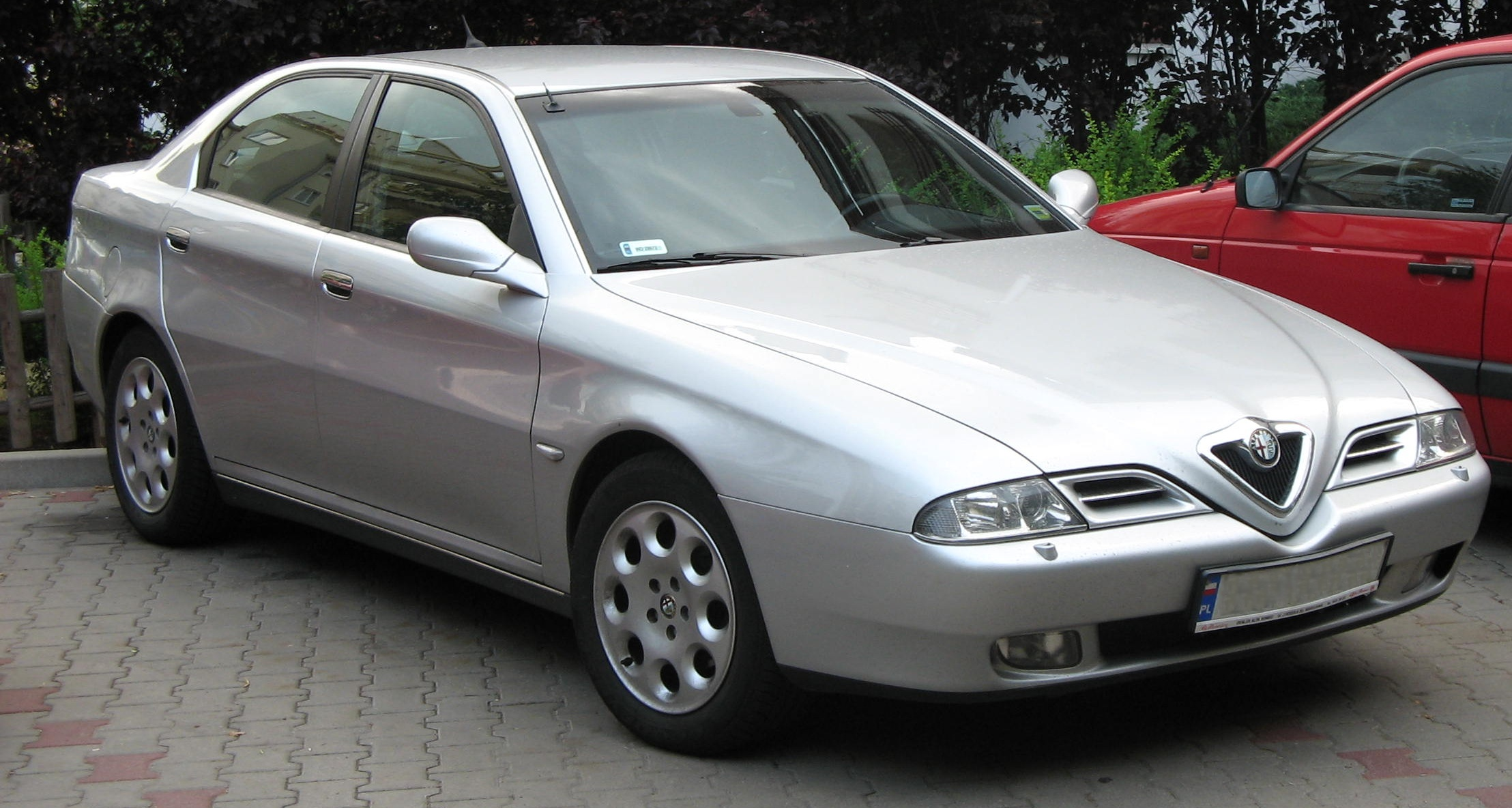
Alfa Romeo 166 (pre-facelift)

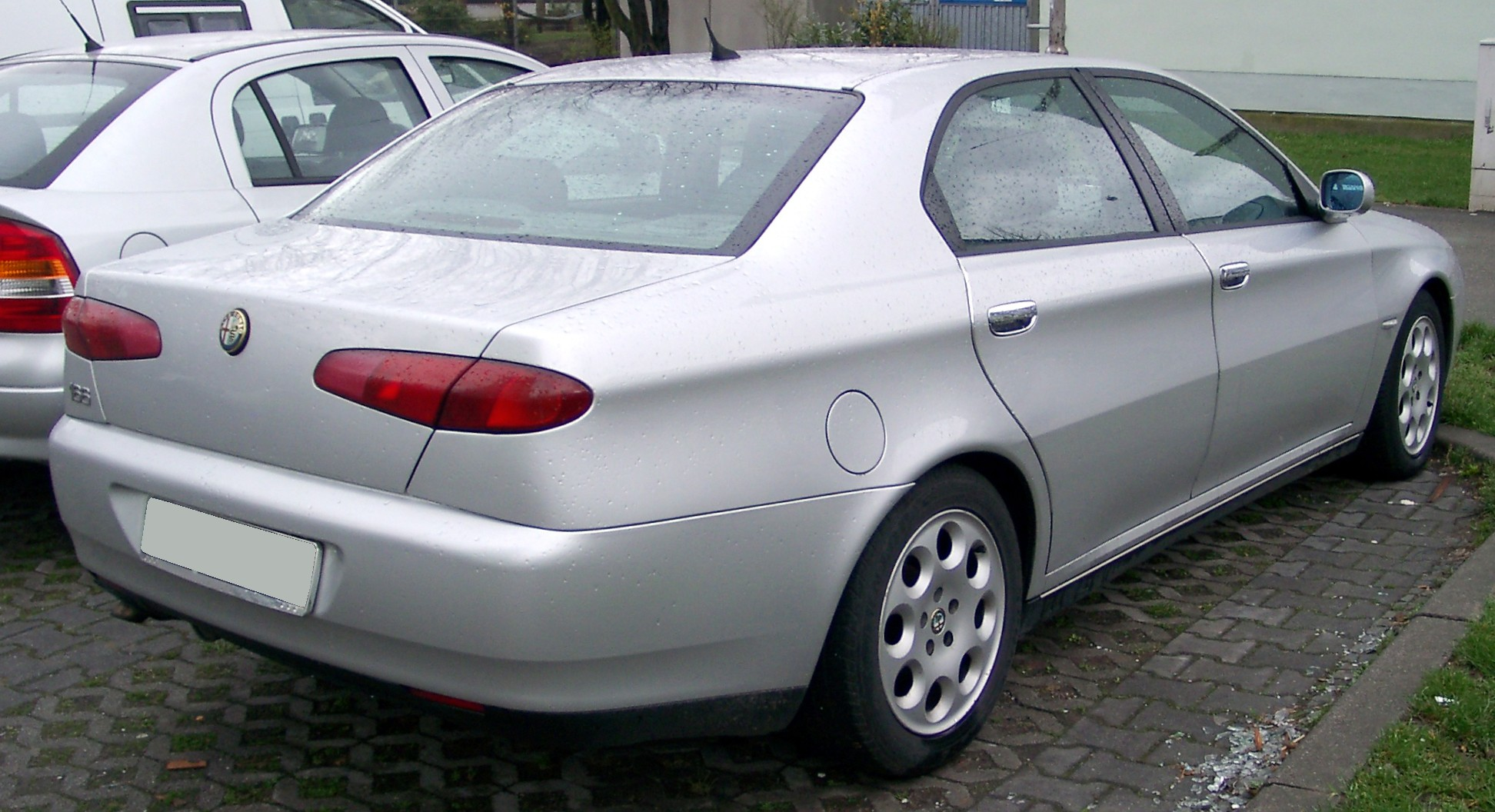
Rear view (pre-facelift)

The 166 served as the replacement for the 164. In order to keep the design fresh, Alfa Romeo made a series of modifications to the Lancia Kappa based underpinnings, radically changing the suspension set up, and also taking a clean paper approach to the interior.

The car was initially available with the following choices of petrol engines: a 2.0-litre Twin Spark 4-cylinder engine rated at 155 PS (114 kW; 153 hp), a 2.5-litre V6 rated at 190 PS (140 kW; 187 hp), a 3.0-litre V6 rated at rated at 226 PS (166 kW; 223 hp) or a 2.0-litre turbocharged V6 rated at 206 PS (152 kW; 203 hp). The Diesel engine options consisted a L5 2.4-litre 10v common rail turbodiesel version rated at 136 PS (100 kW; 134 hp), 140 PS (103 kW; 138 hp) and 150 PS (110 kW; 148 hp), praised for its refinement.

The TS model used a five-speed manual gearbox, whilst the 2.5 and 3.0 had the option of a Sportronic automatic gearbox. The 3.0 V6, L5 2.4, and V6 Turbo were otherwise supplied with a six-speed manual gearbox.

The top models were named "Super" and included a MOMO leather interior, 17" alloy wheels, rain sensitive wipers, cruise control, climate control and ICS (Integrated Control System) with a colour screen. Options included xenon headlamps, GSM connectivity and satellite navigation.

The suspension system consisted of wishbones at the front and a multi-link setup at the rear.

=== Facelift (2003) ===
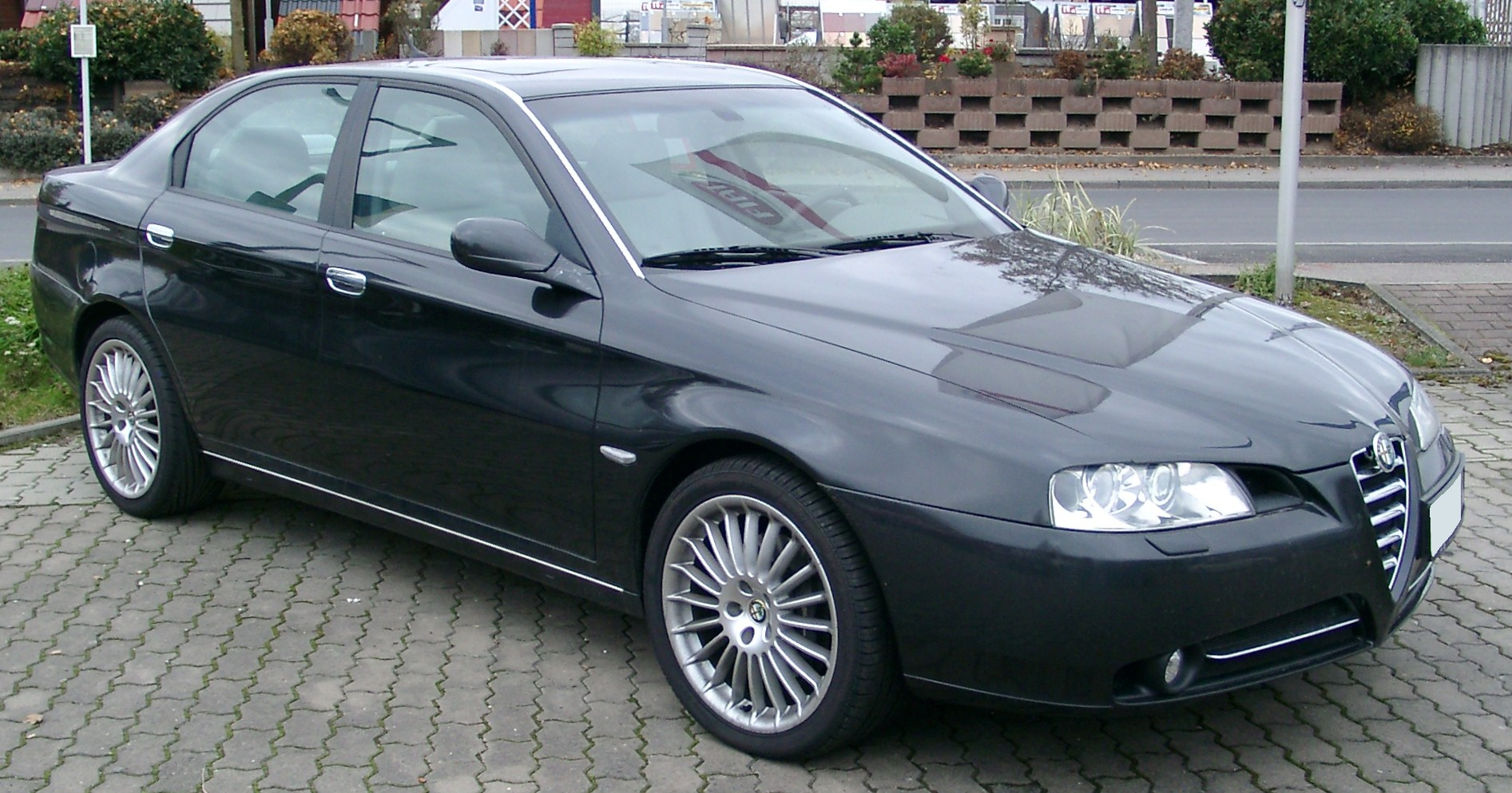
Alfa Romeo 166 (facelift)

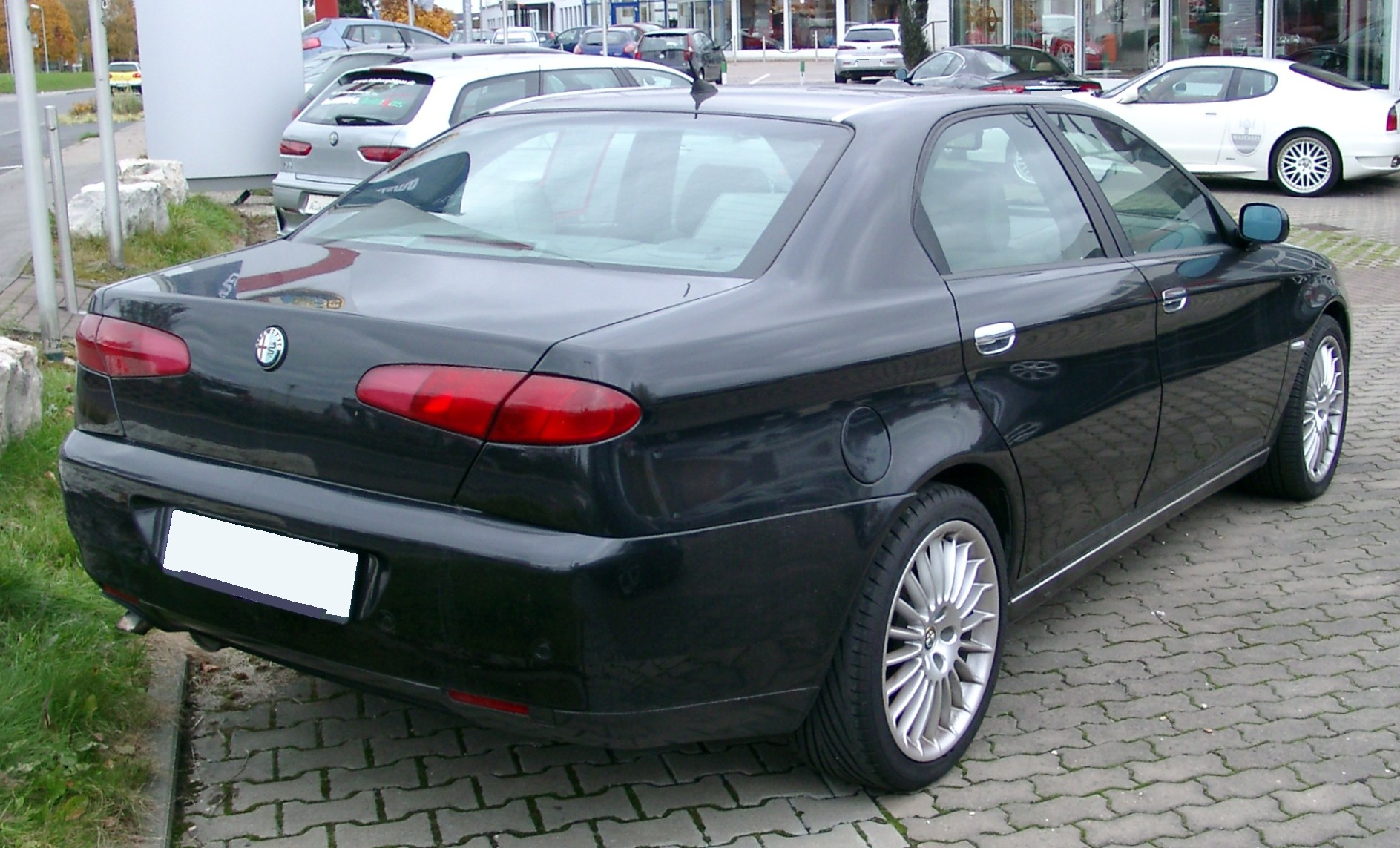
Rear view (facelift)

By the second half of 2001, Centro Stile Alfa Romeo began working on a facelift for the 166. The facelift was designed by the newly hired Daniele Gaglione under the supervision of Wofgang Egger. The facelift of the 166 was unveiled at the Frankfurt Motor Show. The facelift included upgrades to the chassis, interior, and engine range. The new front end resembled the also recently revised 156.

The 2.0-litre V6 Turbo model was dropped because of marketing problems, the 2.5-litre V6 underwent a revision and now had a power output of 188 PS (138 kW; 185 hp). A new 3.2-litre V6 was introduced as a range topping option, rated at 240 PS (177 kW; 237 hp). Both the new 3.2-litre and the 2.0 Twin Spark models now featured the six-speed manual gearbox, whilst the 3.0 model was retained but made available only in the Sportronic form.

The L5 2.4 was re-engineered with Multi-Jet technology which allowed up to five injections per cycle, second stage common rail, with a maximum injection pressure of 1400 bar and four valves per cylinder, to output a class-leading 175 PS (129 kW; 173 hp).

=== End of production ===
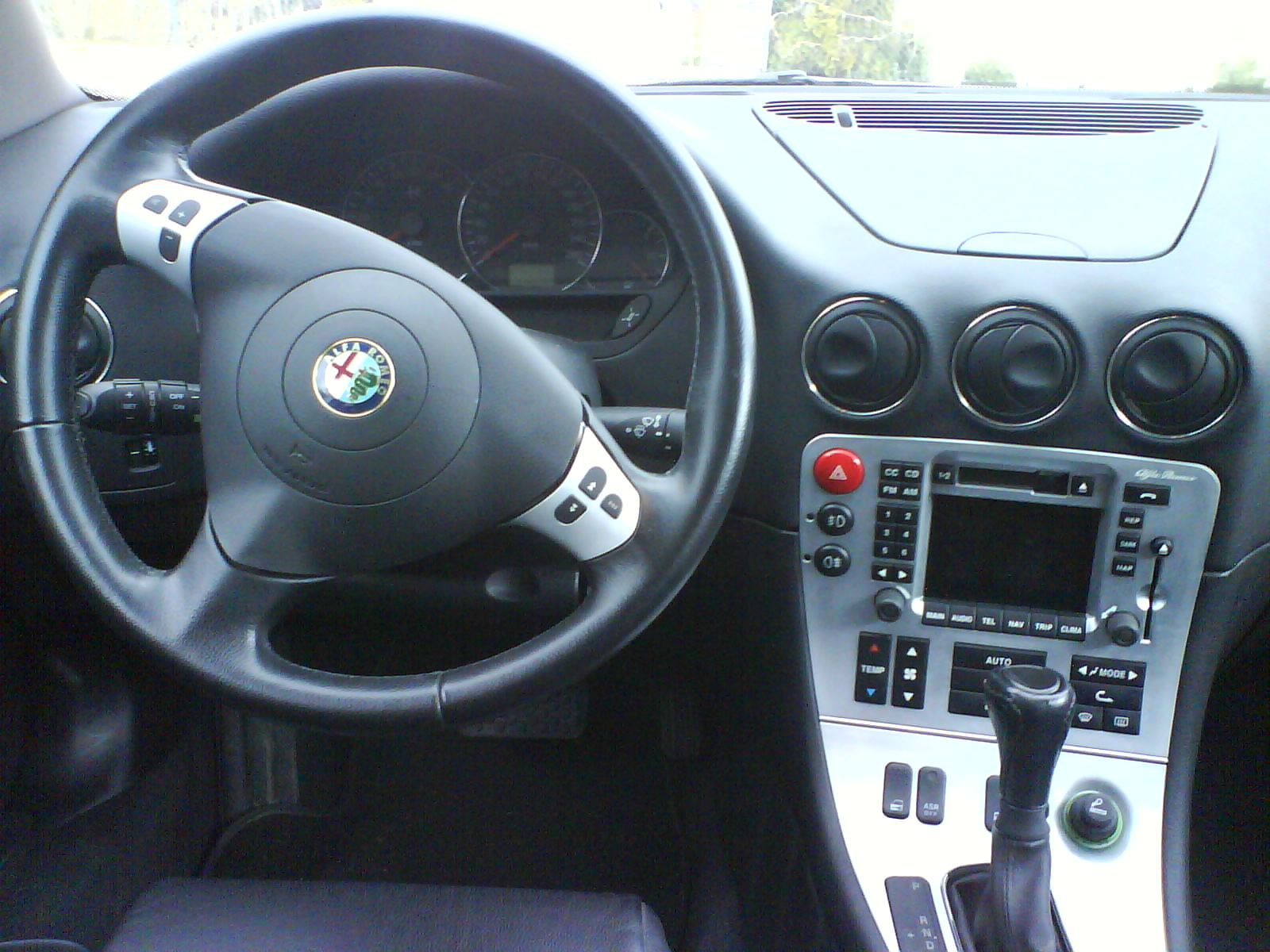
3.0 V6 Sporttronic (interior view)

In October 2005, the Alfa Romeo 166 was officially withdrawn from sale in markets for RHD. Sales of the 166 never grew as Alfa Romeo had hoped, following the facelift in September 2003, and the additional lack of a diesel engine in the United Kingdom, Australian, and Irish markets limited its reach into company car sectors. The 2.4 JTD diesel engine was only available in left-hand drive markets.

In June 2007, the production of the 166 effectively ended, with no direct successor. In September 2008, the platform was sold to the Chinese state-run manufacturer GAC Group. In total, fewer than 100,000 units were made.

In August 2009, Autocar named the 166 as "Britain's Worst Depreciating Used Car", as it held just 14.4% of its original used value after three years.

== Engines ==
Model	Engine	Displacement	Power	Torque	0–100 km/h (0–62 mph), seconds	Top Speed	Note
First generation of engines, MY 1999–2000
2.0 TS	16V I4	1,970 cc	155 PS (114 kW; 153 hp) at 6,400 rpm	187 N⋅m (138 lb⋅ft) at 2,800 rpm	9.6	213 km/h (132 mph)	Euro2
2.0 V6 TB	12V V6	1,996 cc	205 PS (151 kW; 202 hp) at 6,000 rpm	285 N⋅m (210 lb⋅ft) at 2,500 rpm	8.1	237 km/h (147 mph)	Turbo, Italian tax model
2.5 V6	24V V6	2,492 cc	190 PS (140 kW; 187 hp) at 6,200 rpm	222 N⋅m (164 lb⋅ft) at 5,000 rpm	8.4; 9.5 Sportronic	225 km/h (140 mph); 220 km/h (137 mph) Sportronic	Euro2
3.0 V6	24V V6	2,959 cc	226 PS (166 kW; 223 hp) at 6,200 rpm	275 N⋅m (203 lb⋅ft) at 5,000 rpm	7.8; 8.5 Sportronic	243 km/h (151 mph); 237 km/h (147 mph) Sportronic	Euro2
2.4 JTD	10V I5	2,387 cc	136 PS (100 kW; 134 hp) at 4,000 rpm	304 N⋅m (224 lb⋅ft) at 2,000 rpm	9.9	202 km/h (126 mph)	
Second generation of engines, MY 2001–2003
2.0 TS	16V I4	1,970 cc	150 PS (110 kW; 148 hp) at 6,300 rpm	181 N⋅m (133 lb⋅ft) at 3,800 rpm	9.8	211 km/h (131 mph)	Euro3
2.5 V6	24V V6	2,492 cc	188 PS (138 kW; 185 hp) at 6,300 rpm	221 N⋅m (163 lb⋅ft) at 5,000 rpm	8.4; 9.5 Sportronic	225 km/h (140 mph); 220 km/h (137 mph) Sportronic	Euro3
3.0 V6	24V V6	2,959 cc	220 PS (162 kW; 217 hp) at 6,300 rpm	265 N⋅m (195 lb⋅ft) at 5,000 rpm	7.8; 8.6 Sportronic	241 km/h (150 mph); 237 km/h (147 mph) Sportronic	Euro3
2.4 JTD	10V I5	2,387 cc	140–150 PS (103–110 kW; 138–148 hp) at 4,000 rpm	305 N⋅m (225 lb⋅ft) at 1,800 rpm	9.9	210 km/h (130 mph)	
Third generation of engines, MY 2004 Facelift–2007
2.0 TS	16V I4	1,970 cc	150 PS (110 kW; 148 hp) at 6,400 rpm	181 N⋅m (133 lb⋅ft) at 3,800 rpm	9.8	211 km/h (131 mph)	
2.5 V6	24V V6	2,492 cc	188 PS (138 kW; 185 hp) at 6,300 rpm	221 N⋅m (163 lb⋅ft) at 5,000 rpm	8.4	225 km/h (140 mph)	
3.0 V6	24V V6	2,959 cc	220 PS (162 kW; 217 hp) at 6,300 rpm	265 N⋅m (195 lb⋅ft) at 5,000 rpm	8.6 Sportronic	236 km/h (147 mph) Sportronic	
3.2 V6	24V V6	3,179 cc	240 PS (177 kW; 237 hp) at 6,200 rpm	289 N⋅m (213 lb⋅ft) at 4,800 rpm	7.4	245 km/h (152 mph)	
2.4 JTD	10V I5	2,387 cc	150 PS (110 kW; 148 hp) at 4,000 rpm	305 N⋅m (225 lb⋅ft) at 1,800 rpm	9.9	210 km/h (130 mph)	
2.4 JTD M-Jet	20V I5	2,387 cc	175–185 PS (129–136 kW; 173–182 hp) at 4,000 rpm	385 N⋅m (284 lb⋅ft) at 2,000 rpm 330 N⋅m (243 lb⋅ft) at 1,750 rpm (Sportronic)	8.9; 8.9 Sportronic	222 km/h (138 mph); 218 km/h (135 mph) Sportronic	(depending on model year)
