= Trumpchi GS5 =

Chinese compact crossover SUV

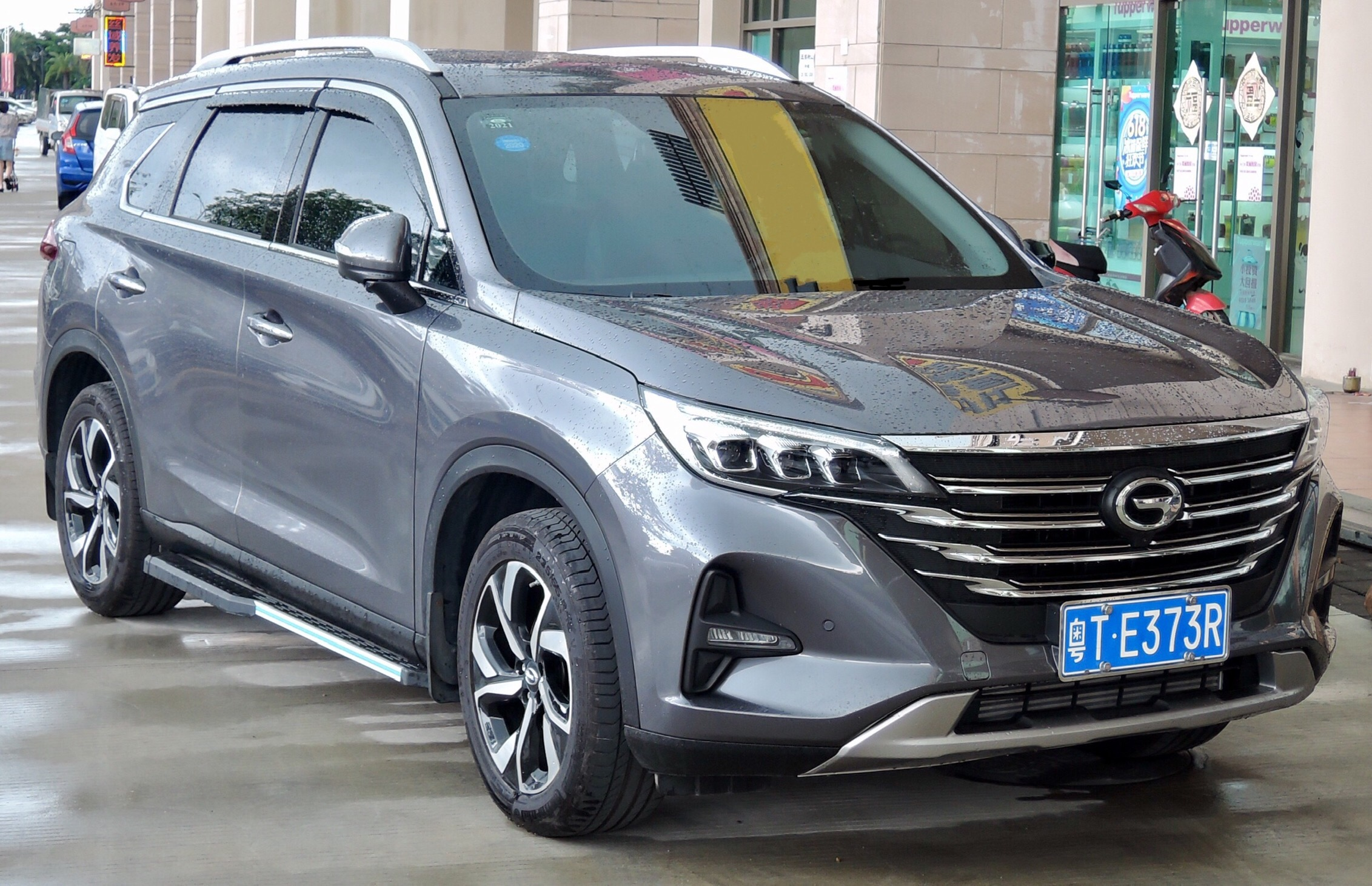
- 2019 Trumpchi GS5

Overview
- Manufacturer: GAC Group
- Production: 2011–2025
- Assembly: China: Guangzhou

Body and chassis
- Class: Compact crossover SUV (C)
- Body style: 5-door SUV
- Layout: Front-engine, front-wheel-drive; Front-engine, all-wheel-drive

The Trumpchi GS5 is a compact crossover SUV produced by GAC Group under the Trumpchi brand. The first generation was sold from 2011 to 2017 with a facelift variant called the GS5 Super launched in 2014, while the second generation model was sold starting in 2018. A facelift for the 2021 model year was launched during the 2021 Shanghai Auto Show, changing the name to Trumpchi GS4 Plus.

== First generation (2011) ==
Trumpchi GS5
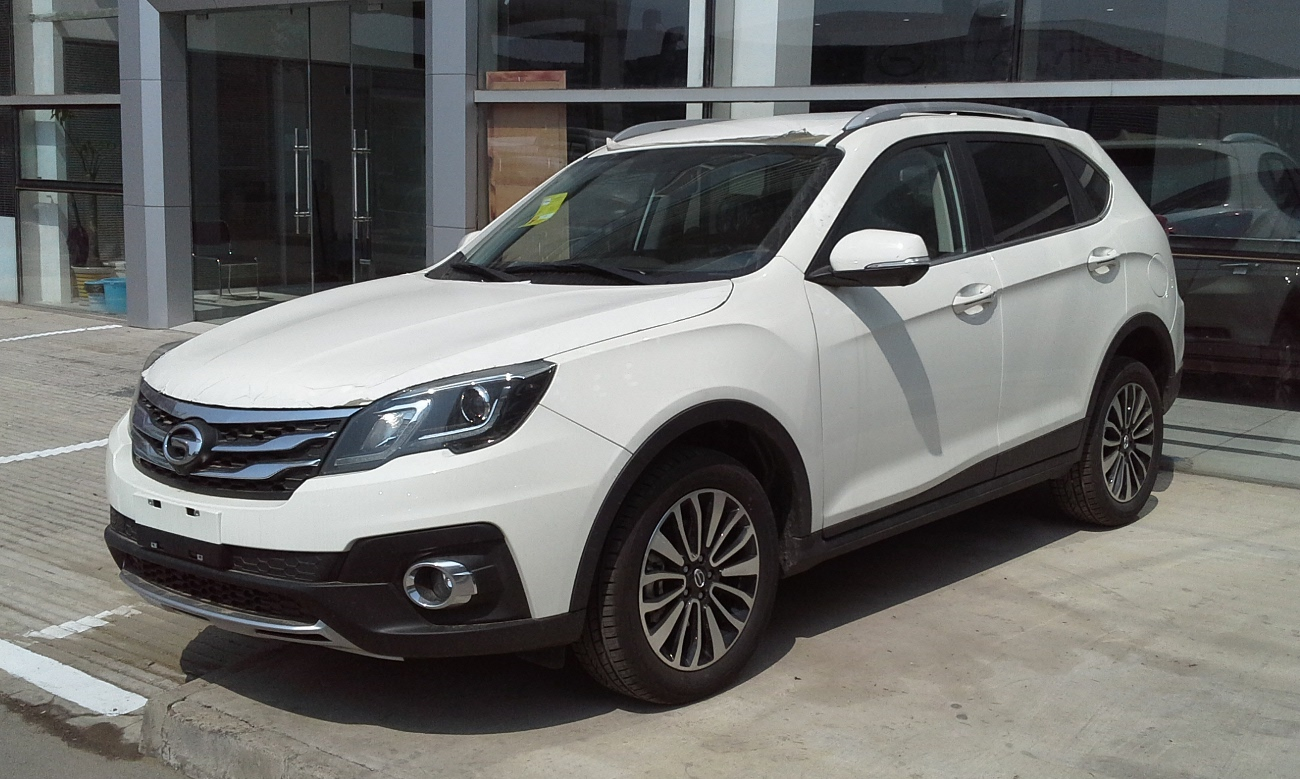
- Trumpchi GS5 Super

Overview
- Also called: Trumpchi GS5S; Trumpchi GS5 Super
- Production: 2011–2017
- Model years: 2012–2017

Body and chassis
- Related: Alfa Romeo 166; Trumpchi GA5

Powertrain
- Engine: Gasoline: 1.8 L 4B18M1 turbocharged I4; 2.0 L 4B20K2 I4; 2.4 L 4B24 I4
- Transmission: 5-speed automatic; 5-speed manual; 7-speed DCT

Dimensions
- Wheelbase: 2,710 mm (106.7 in)
- Length: 4,732 mm (186.3 in)
- Width: 1,854 mm (73.0 in)
- Height: 1,680 mm (66.1 in)

The first generation Trumpchi GS5 debuted during the 2011 Guangzhou Auto Show. Sales started in April 2012.

=== Powertrain ===
Power of the GS5 comes from a 2.0-liter engine with 150 hp (112 kW; 152 PS) and 183 N⋅m (135 lb⋅ft; 19 kg⋅m), mated to a 5-speed manual transmission or 5-speed automatic transmission. A 1.8-liter turbo engine and a 2.4-liter engine was available at a later date.

=== Specifications ===
The Trumpchi GS5 is based on the same platform as the Trumpchi GA5 sedan which is based on the old Alfa Romeo 166, with a few selected engines also supplied by FCA.

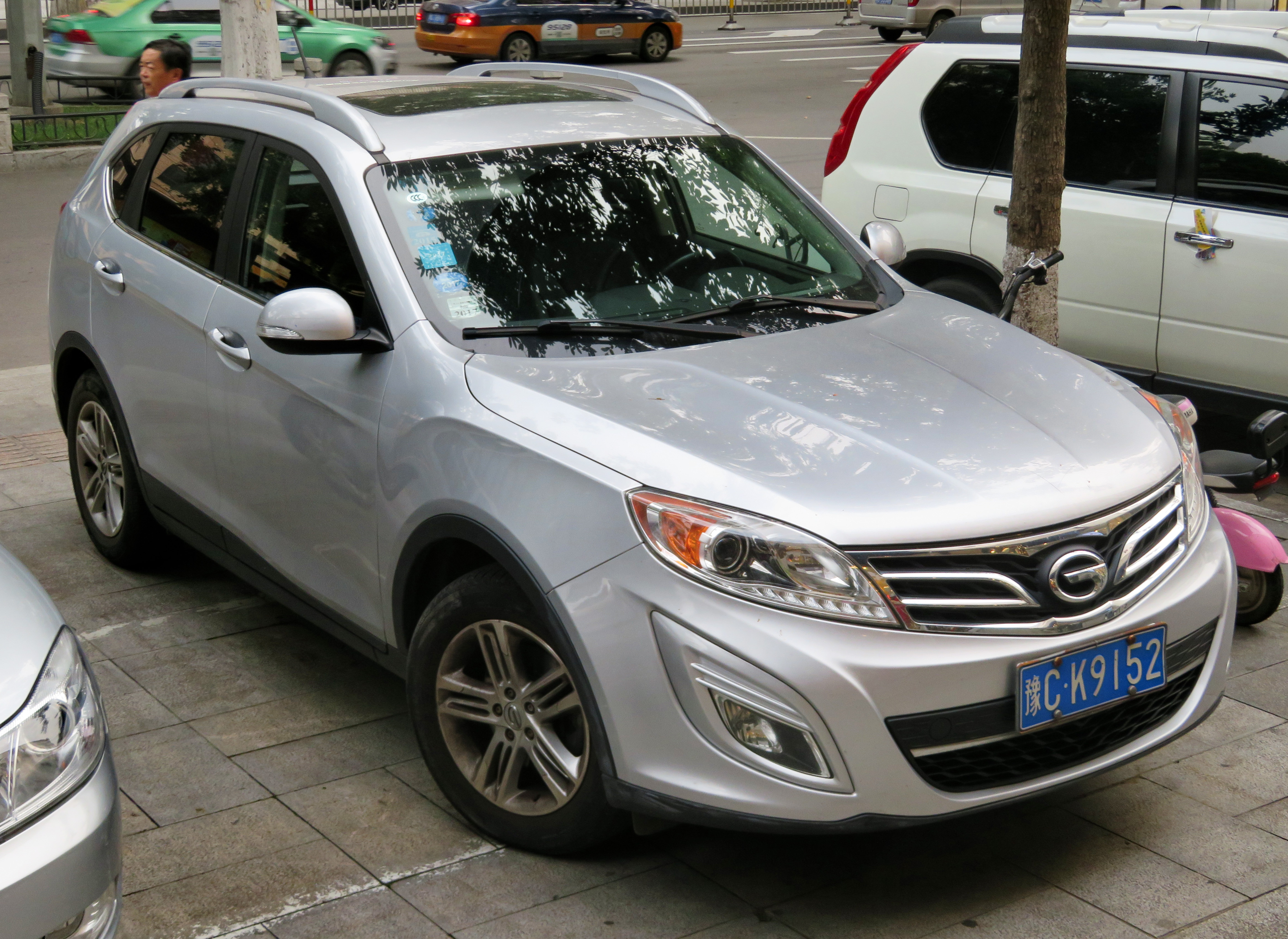
Trumpchi GS5 front (Pre-facelift)

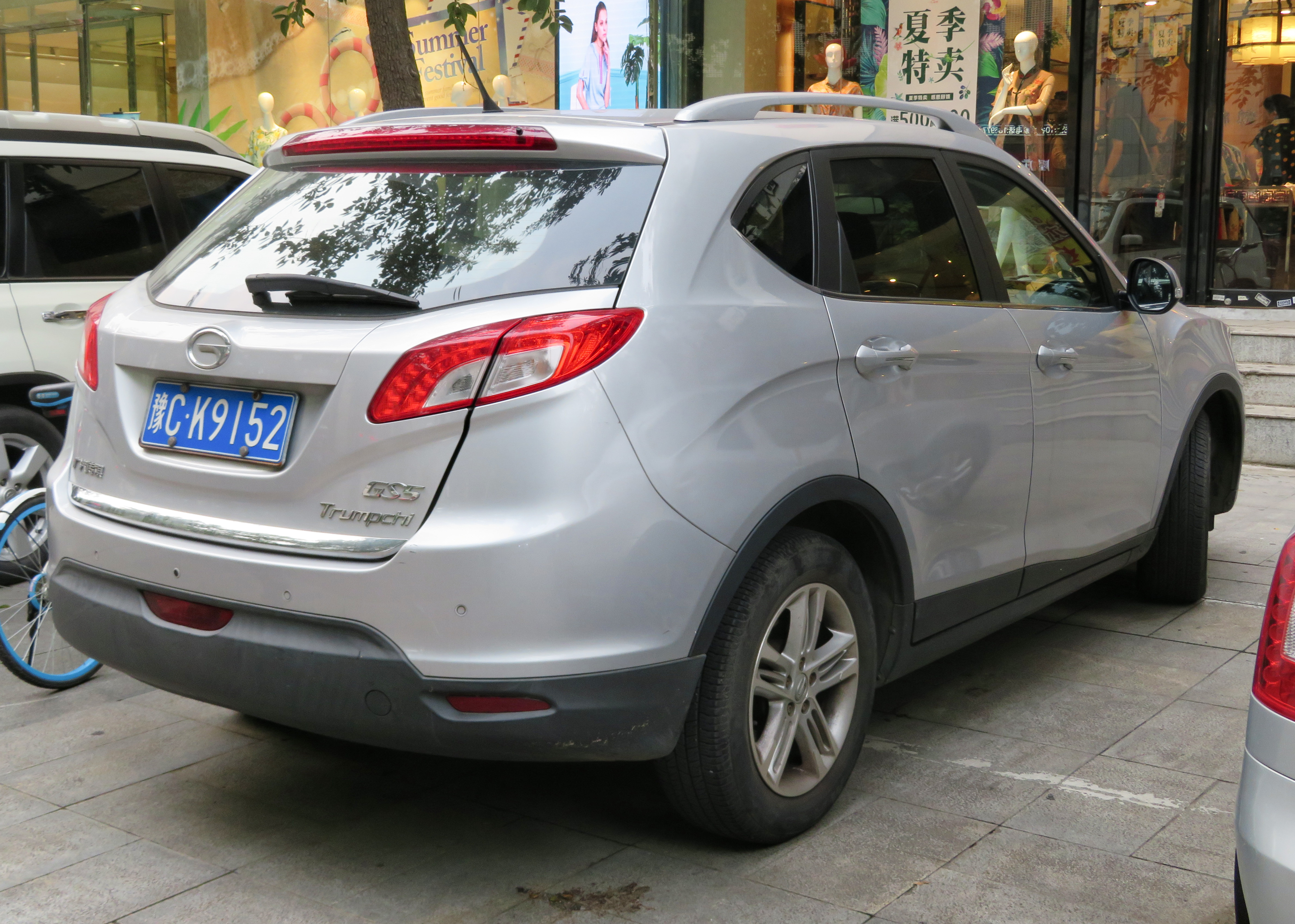
Trumpchi GS5 rear (Pre-facelift)

=== Trumpchi GS5 Super ===
A facelift was conducted in 2014, changing the name to Trumpchi GS5S or Trumpchi GS5 Super, and adding a 7-speed DCT. Price of the Trumpchi GS5 Super starts around 123,800 yuan and ends at around 156,800 yuan.

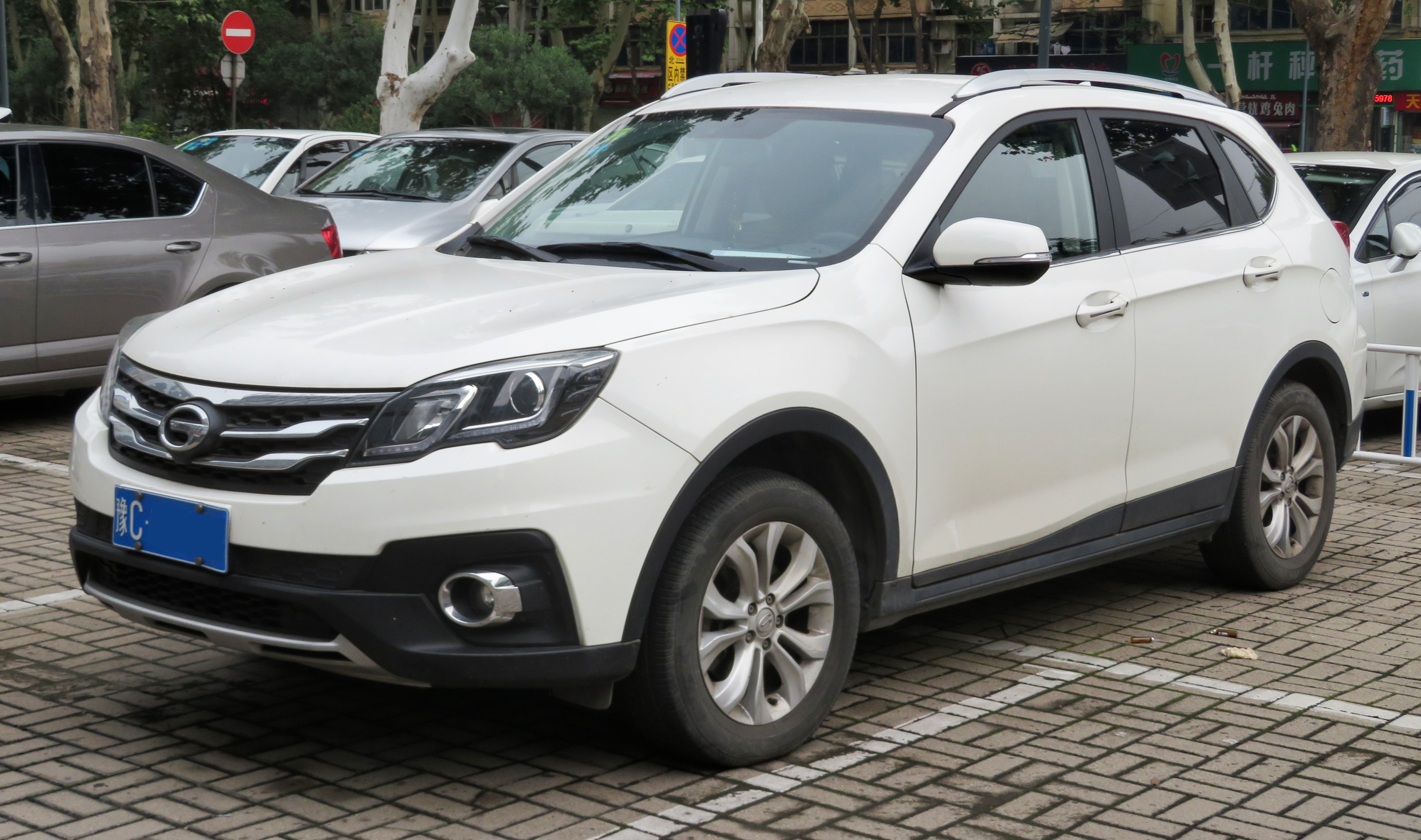
Trumpchi GS5 Super front (Post-facelift)

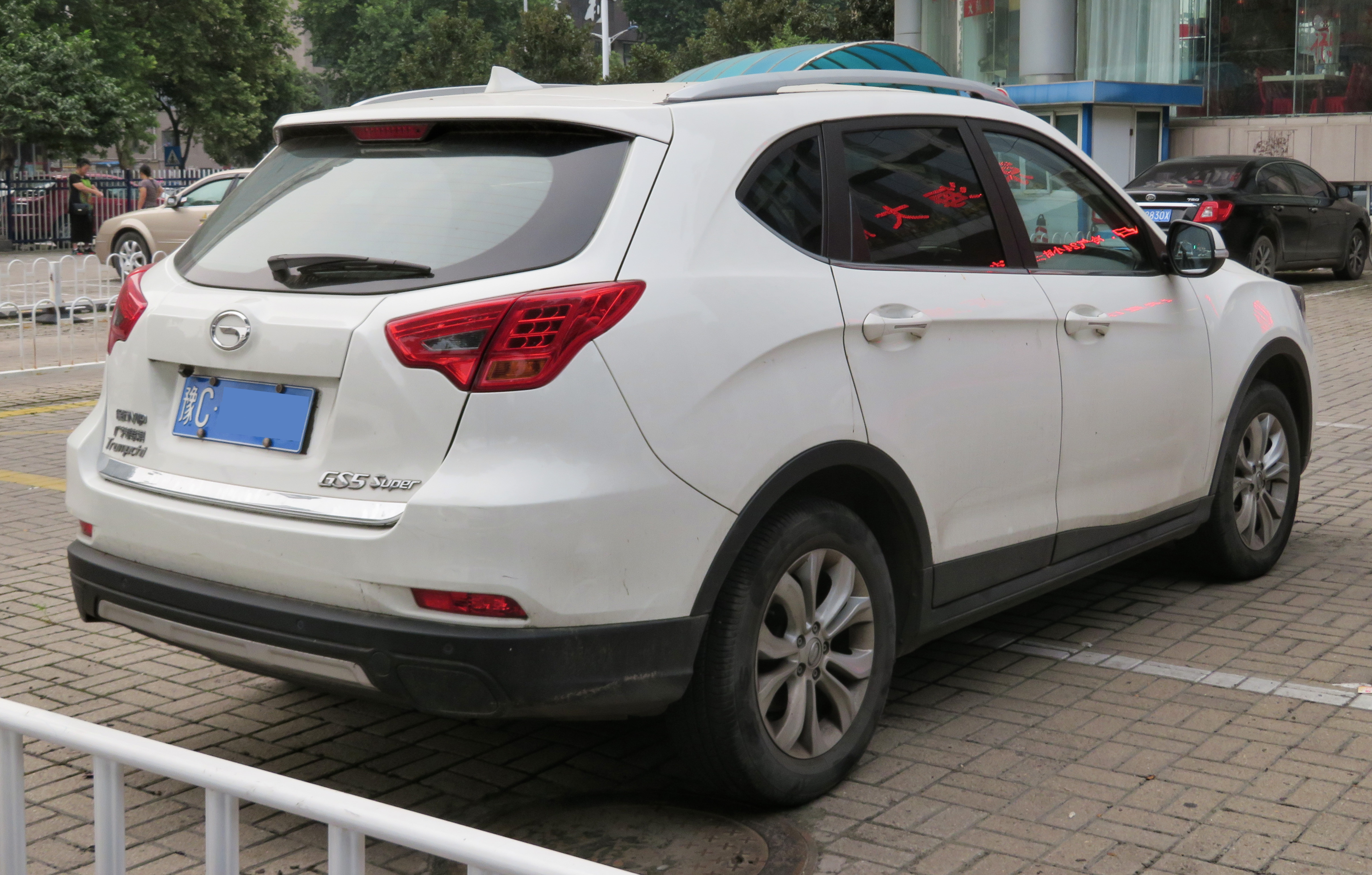
Trumpchi GS5 Super rear (Post-facelift)

=== Recall ===
One million GS5s and other Trumpchi cars were recalled in 2018 because of fuel pump safety issues.

== Second generation (2018) ==
Trumpchi GS5 II
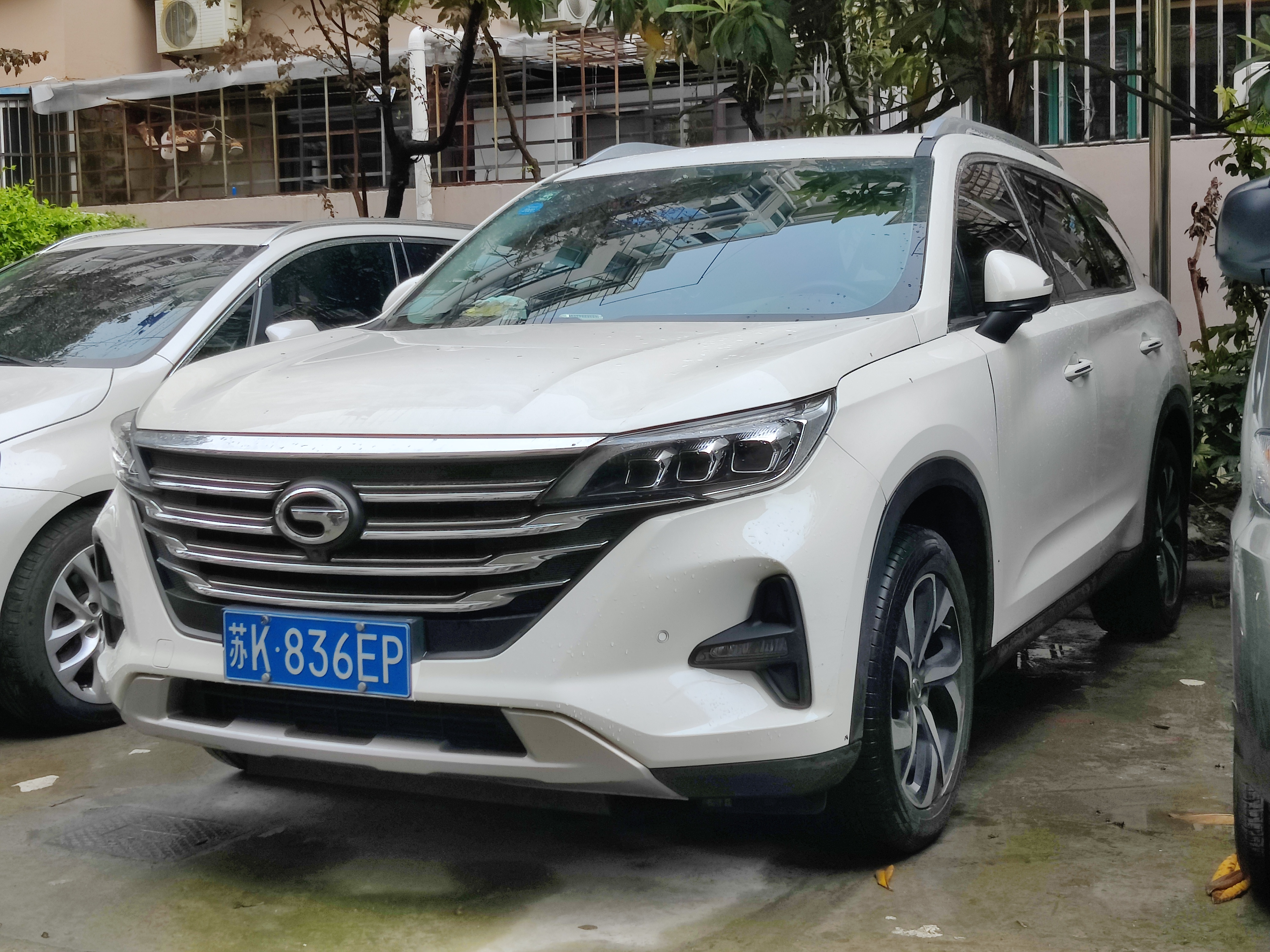
- Trumpchi GS5 II

Overview
- Also called: Dodge Journey (Mexico); GAC GS5
- Production: 2018–2021 (as GS5); 2018–2025 (export); 2021–2025 (as GS4 Plus)
- Model years: 2022–2026 (Dodge Journey)

Powertrain
- Engine: Gasoline: 1.5 L 4A15J1 turbocharged I4
- Transmission: 6-speed Aisin 6AT automatic; 5-speed manual

Dimensions
- Wheelbase: 2,710 mm (106.7 in)
- Length: 4,695 mm (184.8 in)
- Width: 1,885 mm (74.2 in)
- Height: 1,700–1,726 mm (66.9–68.0 in)

Chronology
- Predecessor: Dodge Journey (JC) (Mexico)

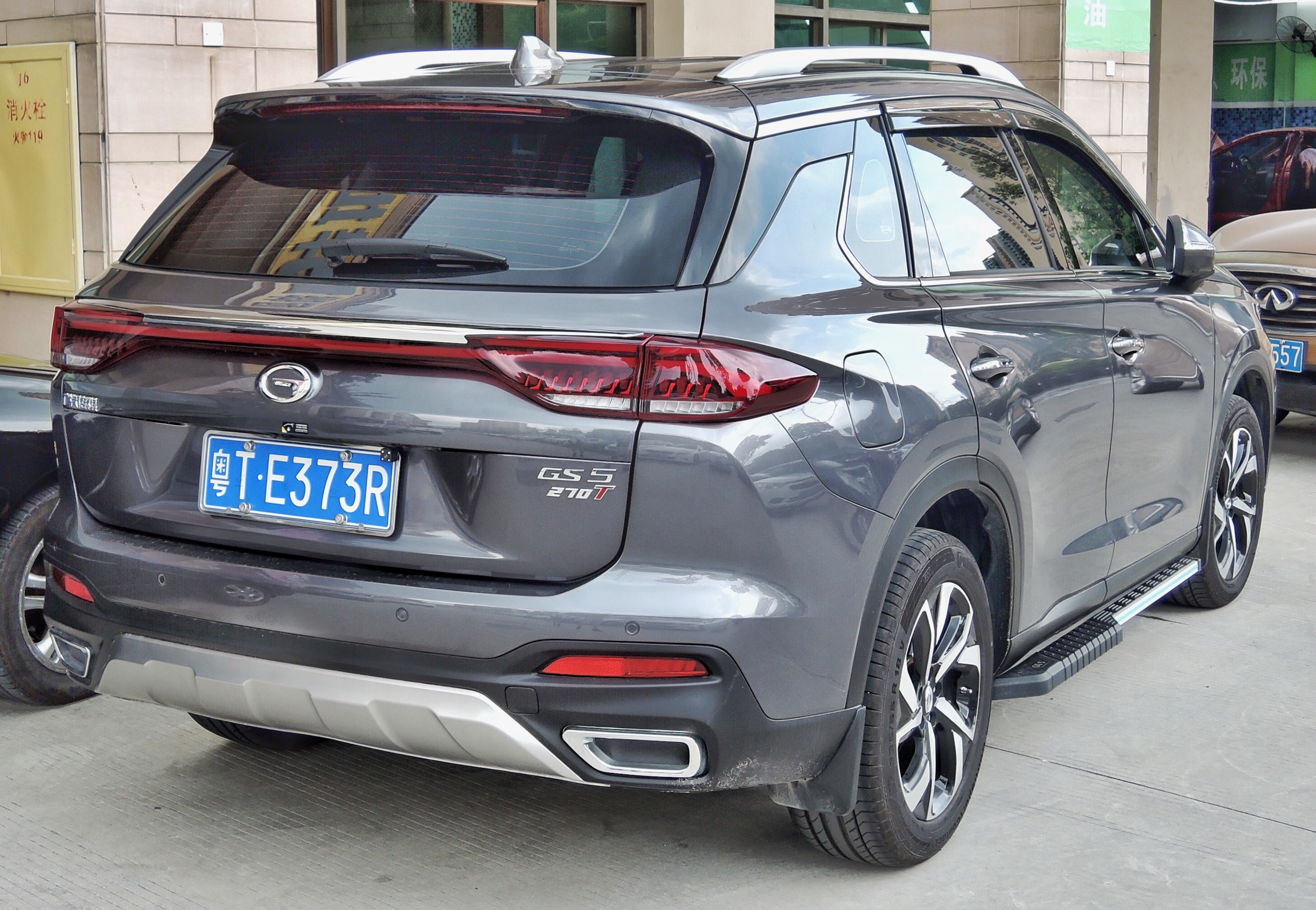
Rear view

The second generation Trumpchi GS5 was unveiled during the 2018 Paris Auto Show.

The second generation GS5 is equipped with the "Trumpchi Cloud Concept 2.0" infotainment system with embedded navigation.

=== Powertrain ===
Powering the second generation GS5 is s a 1.5-liter turbocharged I4 engine producing a maximum 124 kW (166 hp; 169 PS) at 5000 rpm and 265 N⋅m (195 lb⋅ft; 27 kg⋅m) of torque at 4000 rpm. The engine has a fuel consumption of about 33 mpg_{‑US} (7.1 L/100 km; 40 mpg_{‑imp}). Gearbox is a six-speed automatic transmission.

=== Dodge Journey ===
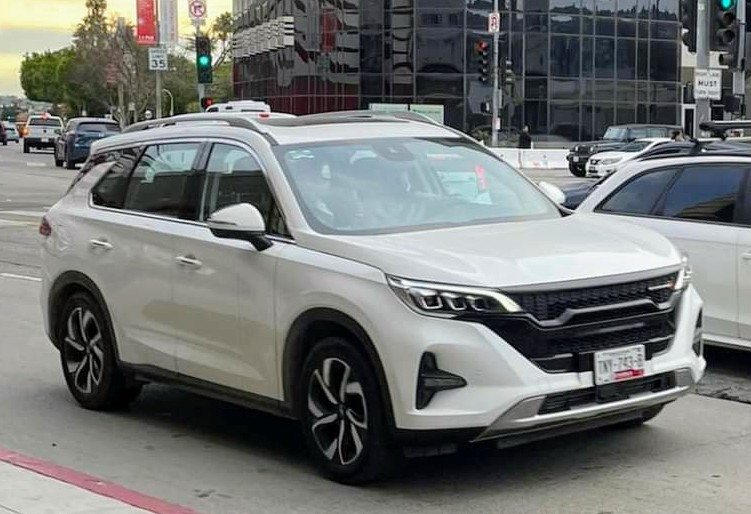
Dodge Journey

The Trumpchi GS5 was sold in the Mexican market under the Dodge brand as the Journey nameplate. It was revealed on 27 September 2021 and arrived in the Mexican Dodge showrooms by November 2021. It was offered in three variants: SXT, Sport, and GT.

The second-generation Journey for the Mexican market was produced in China by GAC Fiat Chrysler instead of being produced in Mexico from the previous generation model by TCA (since 2009–2020). 2026 was the final model year for the Journey, and in May 2026 it was removed from the Dodge Mexico website.

=== Trumpchi GS4 Plus (2021) ===
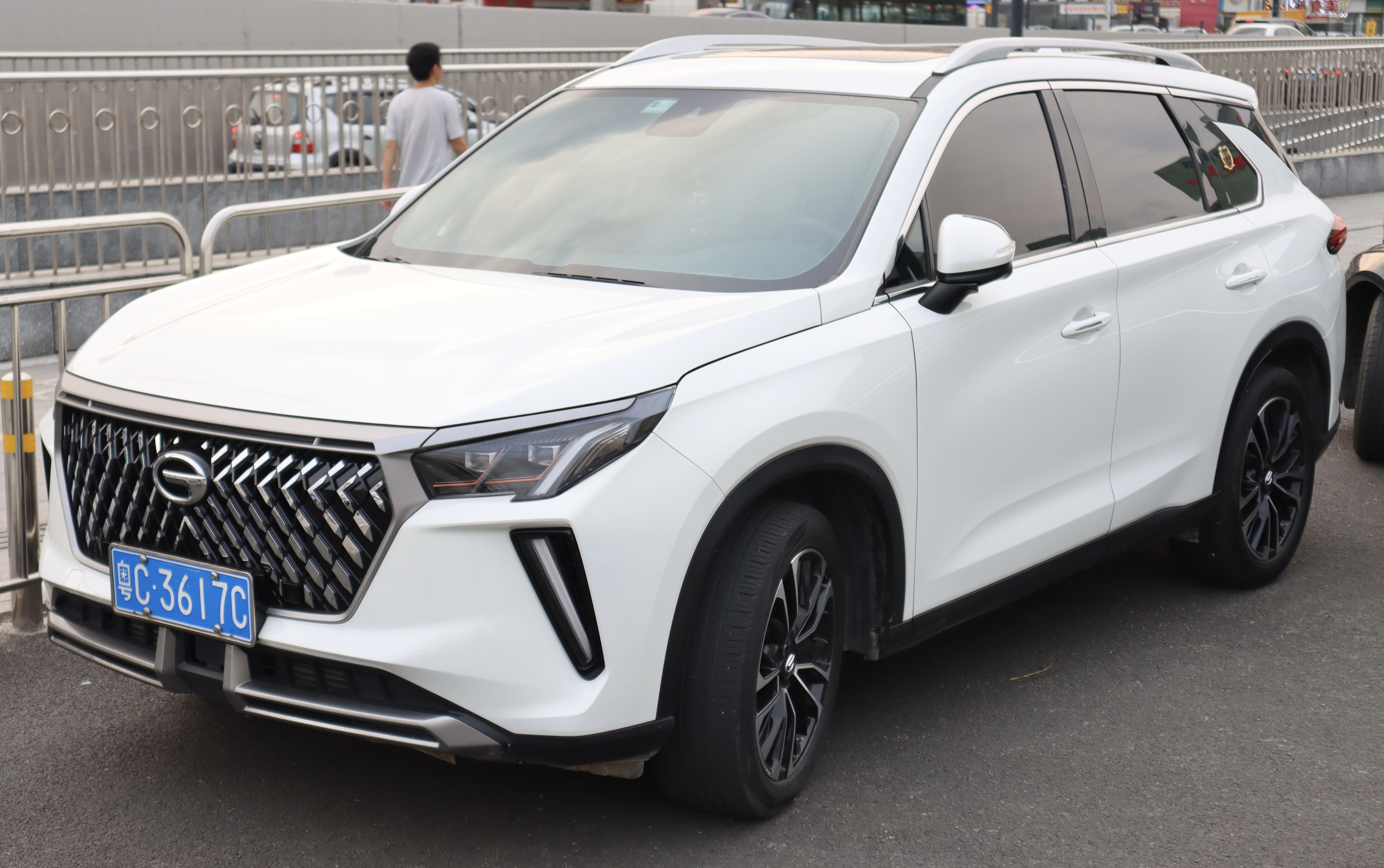
Trumpchi GS4 Plus

The 2021 facelift of the second generation GS5 was renamed to Trumpchi GS4 Plus. It features completely redesigned front and rear ends and restyled 19-inch alloys, while the interior still heavily resembles the interior of the second generation GS5.

== Sales ==
Year	China	Mexico (as Dodge Journey)
2012	24,447	—
2013	65,742	—
2014	76,131	—
2015	26,327	—
2016	7,526	—
2017	1,419	—
2018	14,598	—
2019	47,054	—
2020	18,629	—
2021	9,911	2,209
2022		9,119
2023	3,086	8,191
2024	1	6,248
2025	13	

== See also ==
- List of GAC vehicles
