= Trumpchi GA6 =

Chinese mid-size sedan

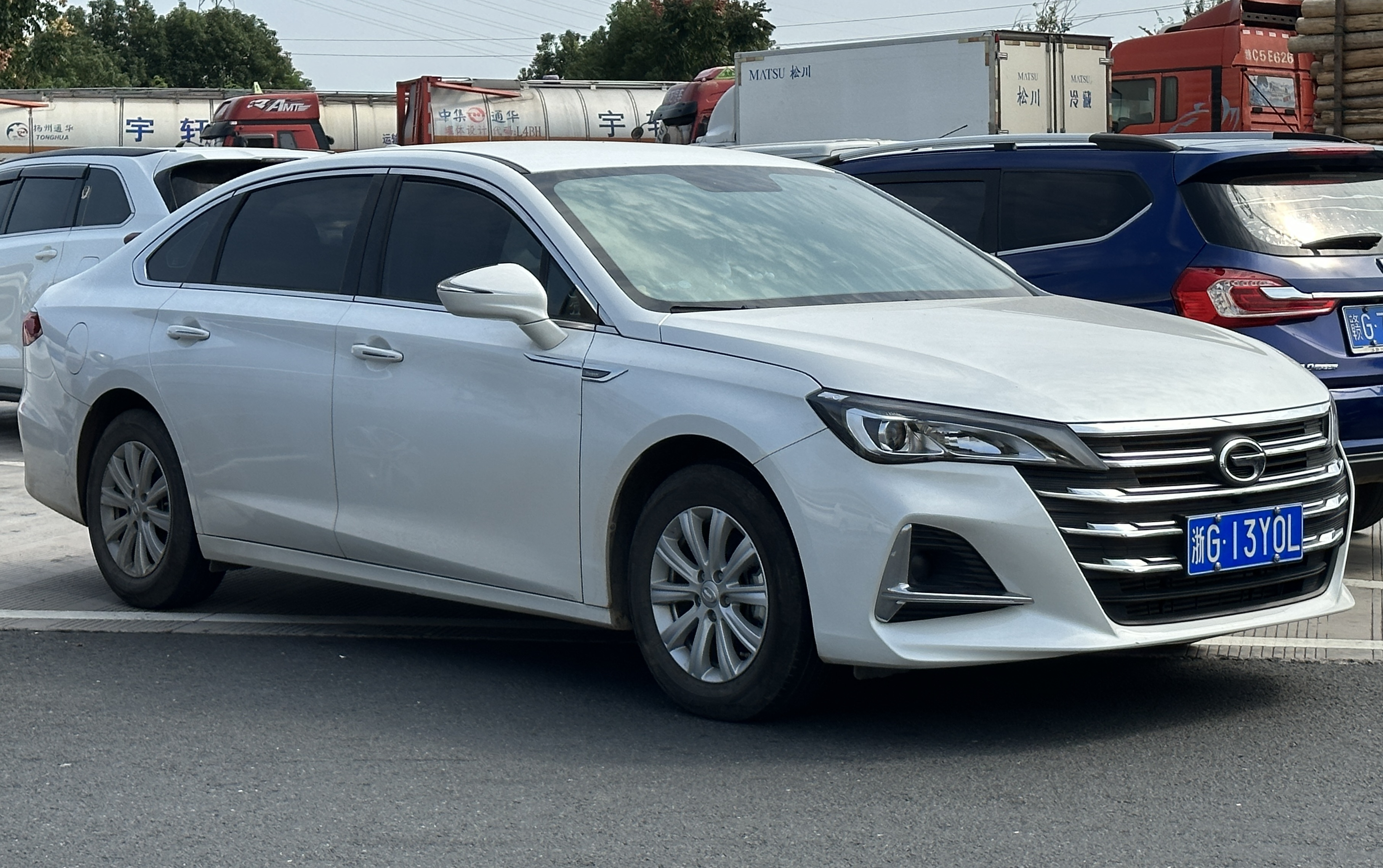
- Trumpchi GA6 second generation

Overview
- Manufacturer: GAC Group
- Also called: GAC GA6
- Production: 2014–2023

Body and chassis
- Class: Mid-size car (D)
- Body style: 4-door sedan
- Layout: Front-engine, front-wheel-drive

The Trumpchi GA6 is a mid-size sedan produced by GAC Group under the Trumpchi brand in China starting from 2014, and under the GAC Motor brand globally.

== First generation (2014) ==
First generation
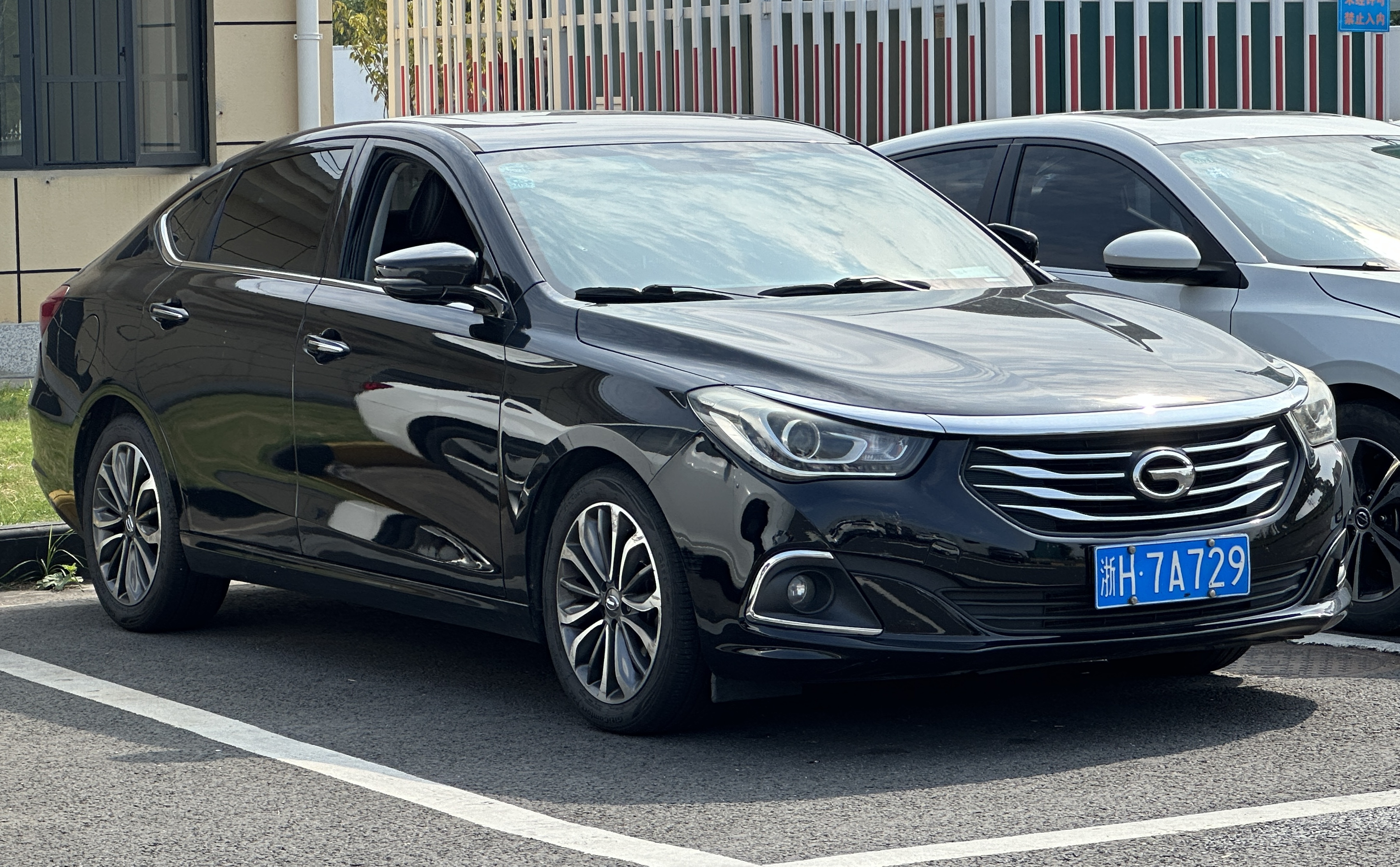
- Trumpchi GA6

Overview
- Production: 2014–2019
- Assembly: Guangzhou, China

Powertrain
- Engine: Petrol: 1.5 L 4B15M1 turbo I4; 1.6 L 4B16M1 turbo I4; 1.8 L 4B18M1 turbo I4
- Transmission: 5-speed manual; 7-speed DCT

Dimensions
- Wheelbase: 2,720 mm (107.1 in)
- Length: 4,850 mm (190.9 in)
- Width: 1,830 mm (72.0 in)
- Height: 1,485 mm (58.5 in)
- Curb weight: 1,480–1,542 kg (3,263–3,400 lb)

The first generation Trumpchi GA6 originally debuted as a concept on the 2014 Beijing Auto Show in the beginning of 2014, and the production version debuted during the 2014 Guangzhou Auto Show by the end of 2014.

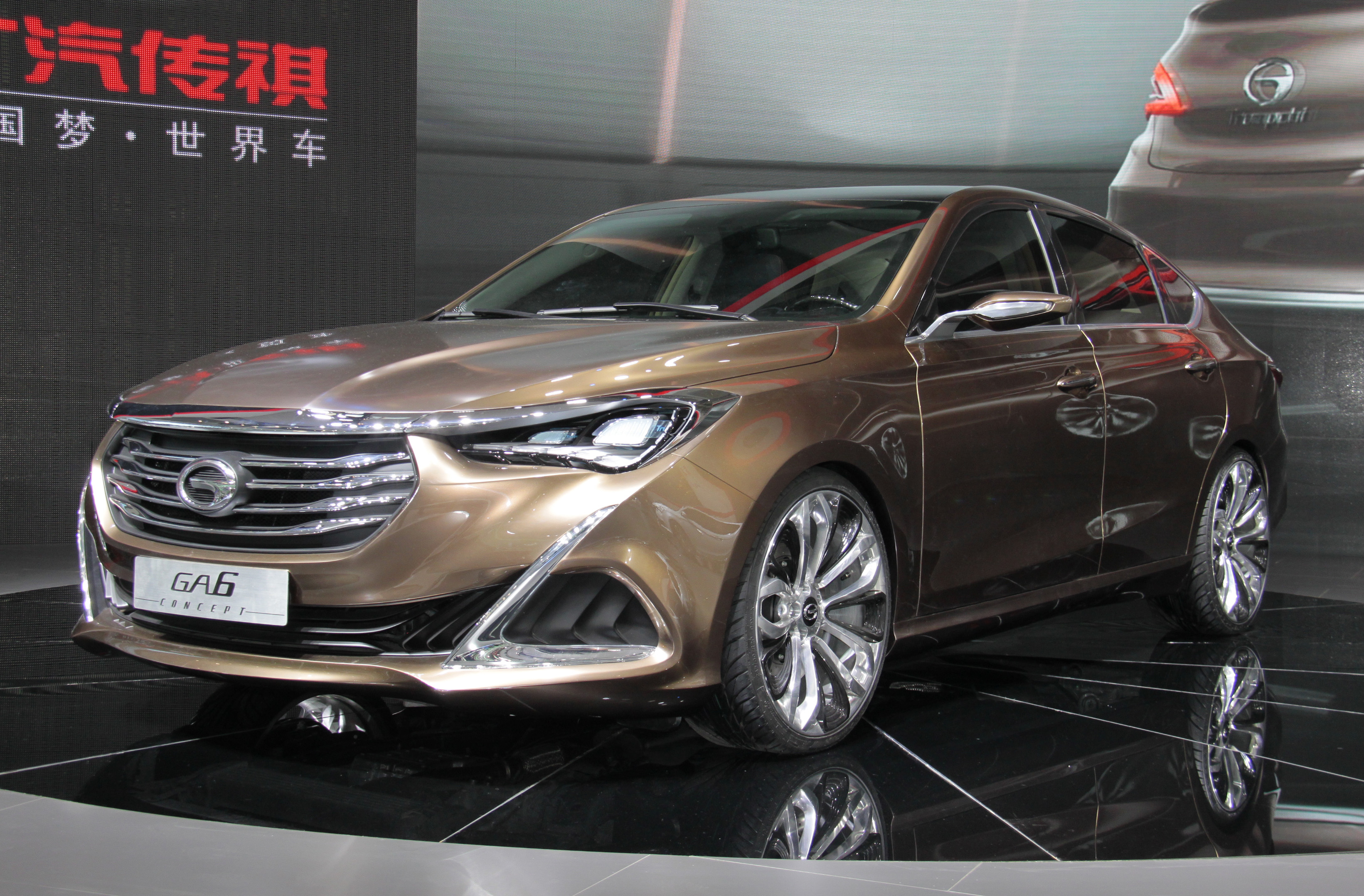
Trumpchi GA6 concept.

At the time, it was the largest sedan produced by GAC. Later in 2015, a concept called the Trumpchi GA6 Limited debuted on the 2015 Detroit Auto Show. The Trumpchi GA6 Limited, also called the Trumpchi GA6 GT, is a concept previewing a possible sporty variant of the Trumpchi GA6 produced by Guangzhou Automobile. Pricing of the GA6 ranges from 116,800 yuan to 196,800 yuan.

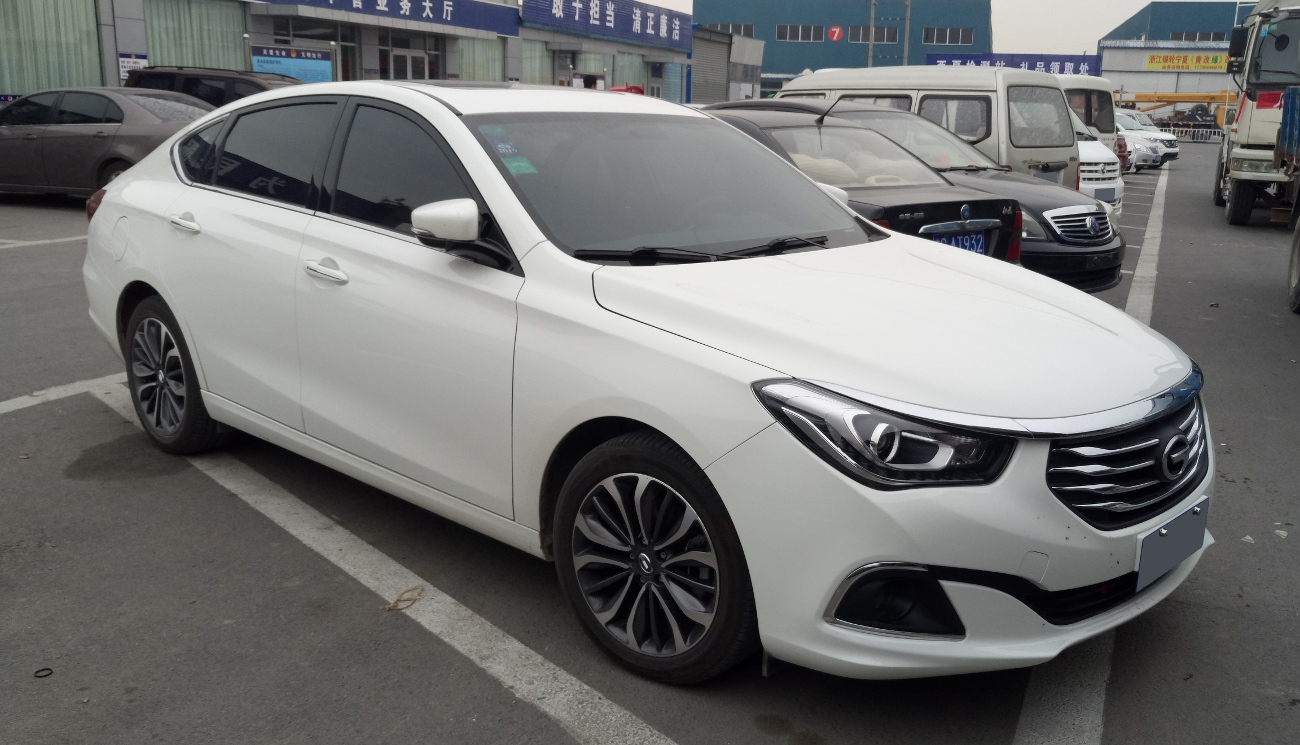
Trumpchi GA6 front.

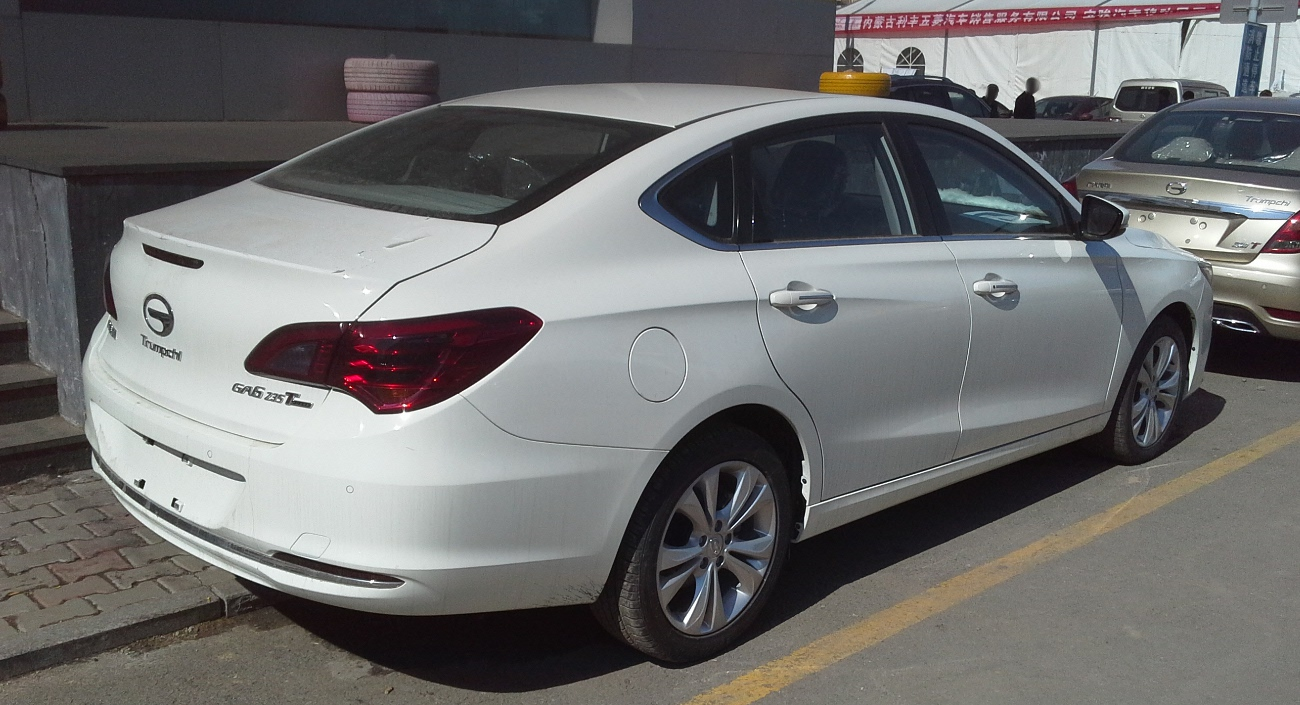
Trumpchi GA6 rear.

=== Powertrain ===
Specs
Model	Years	Transmission	Power at rpm	Torque at rpm	0–100 km/h (0–62 mph) (Official)
1.5 Turbo	2015–2019	5-speed manual 7-speed DCT	112 kW (152 PS; 150 hp) at 5,250 rpm	235 N⋅m (173 lb⋅ft; 24 kg⋅m) at 1,700–5,000 rpm	
1.6 Turbo	2014–2015	5-speed manual	116 kW (158 PS; 156 hp) at 5,250 rpm	216 N⋅m (159 lb⋅ft; 22 kg⋅m) at 1,700–5,000 rpm	10.5s
1.8 Turbo	2014–2015	7-speed DCT	130 kW (177 PS; 174 hp) at 5,250 rpm	242 N⋅m (178 lb⋅ft; 25 kg⋅m) at 1,700–5,250 rpm	9.5s

== Second generation (2019) ==
Second generation
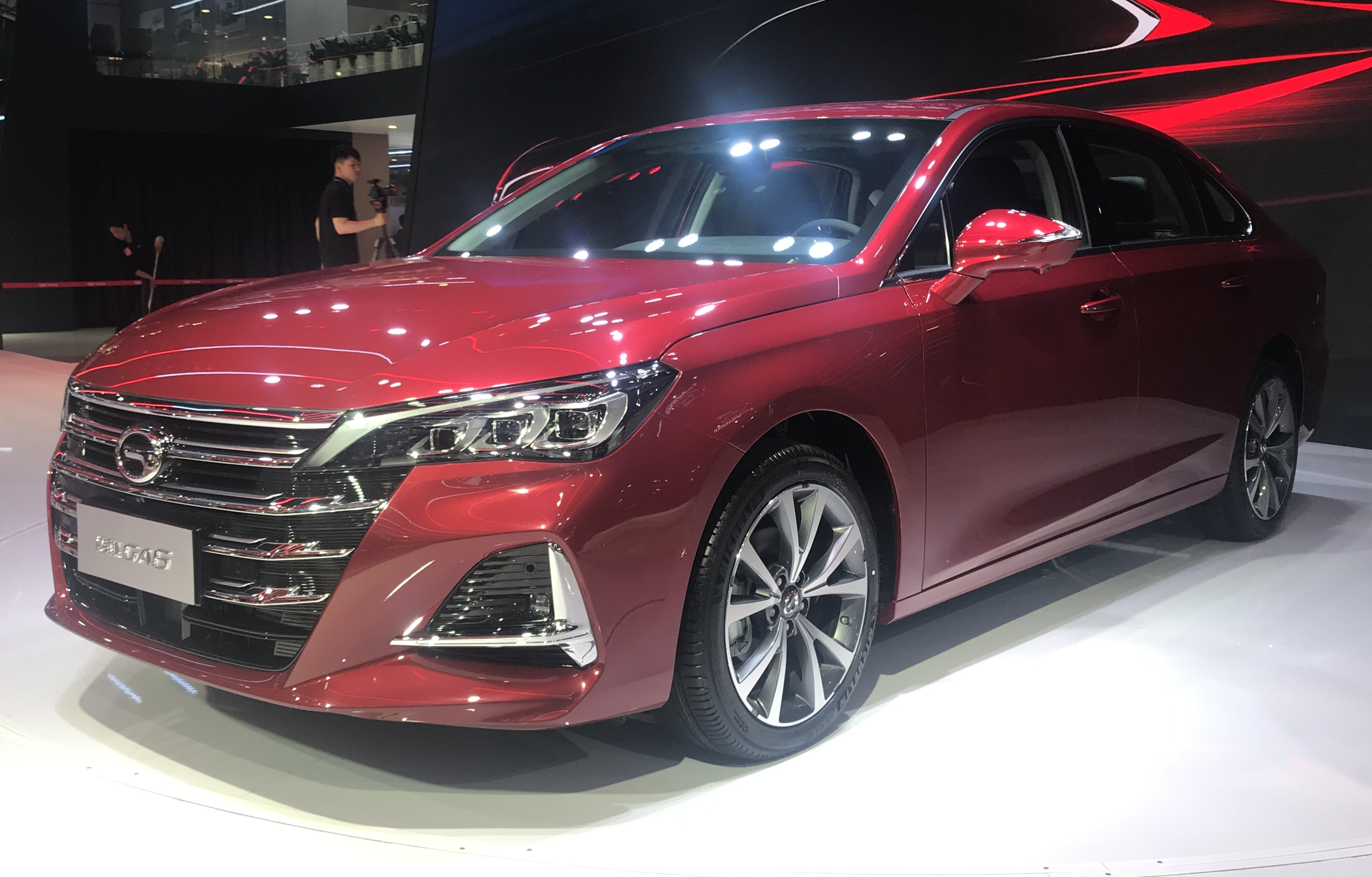
- Trumpchi GA6

Overview
- Production: 2019–2023
- Assembly: Yichang, China

Powertrain
- Engine: Petrol: 1.5 L 4A15J1 turbo I4
- Transmission: 6-speed automatic

Dimensions
- Wheelbase: 2,815 mm (110.8 in)
- Length: 4,891 mm (192.6 in)
- Width: 1,850 mm (72.8 in)
- Height: 1,505 mm (59.3 in)
- Curb weight: 1,455–1,512 kg (3,208–3,333 lb)

The second generation Trumpchi GA6 debuted during the 2019 Shanghai Auto Show in April 2019. The second generation GA6 features the new "Light Sculpture" design language of Trumpchi with the lamps implemented into the front grilles to form the new family front fascia, and full width connected tail lamps are implemented in the rear. The second generation GA6 is equipped with Level 2 semi-autonomous driving assisting system, and is powered by a 1.5 liter turbocharged engine producing 124 kW (169 PS; 166 hp) at 5,000 rpm with 265 N⋅m (195 lbf⋅ft) of torque between 1,700 and 4,000 rpm.

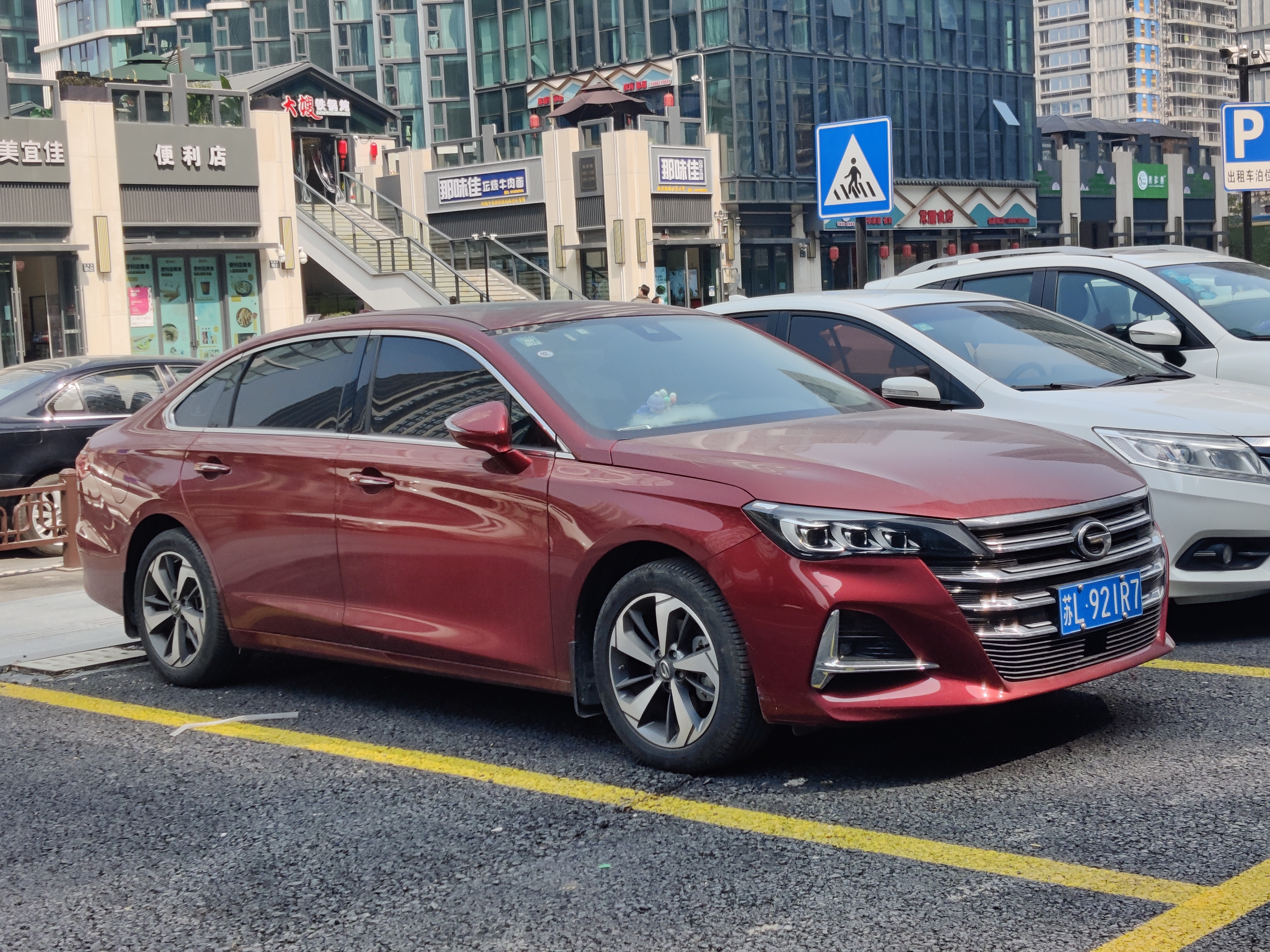
Trumpchi GA6 II front

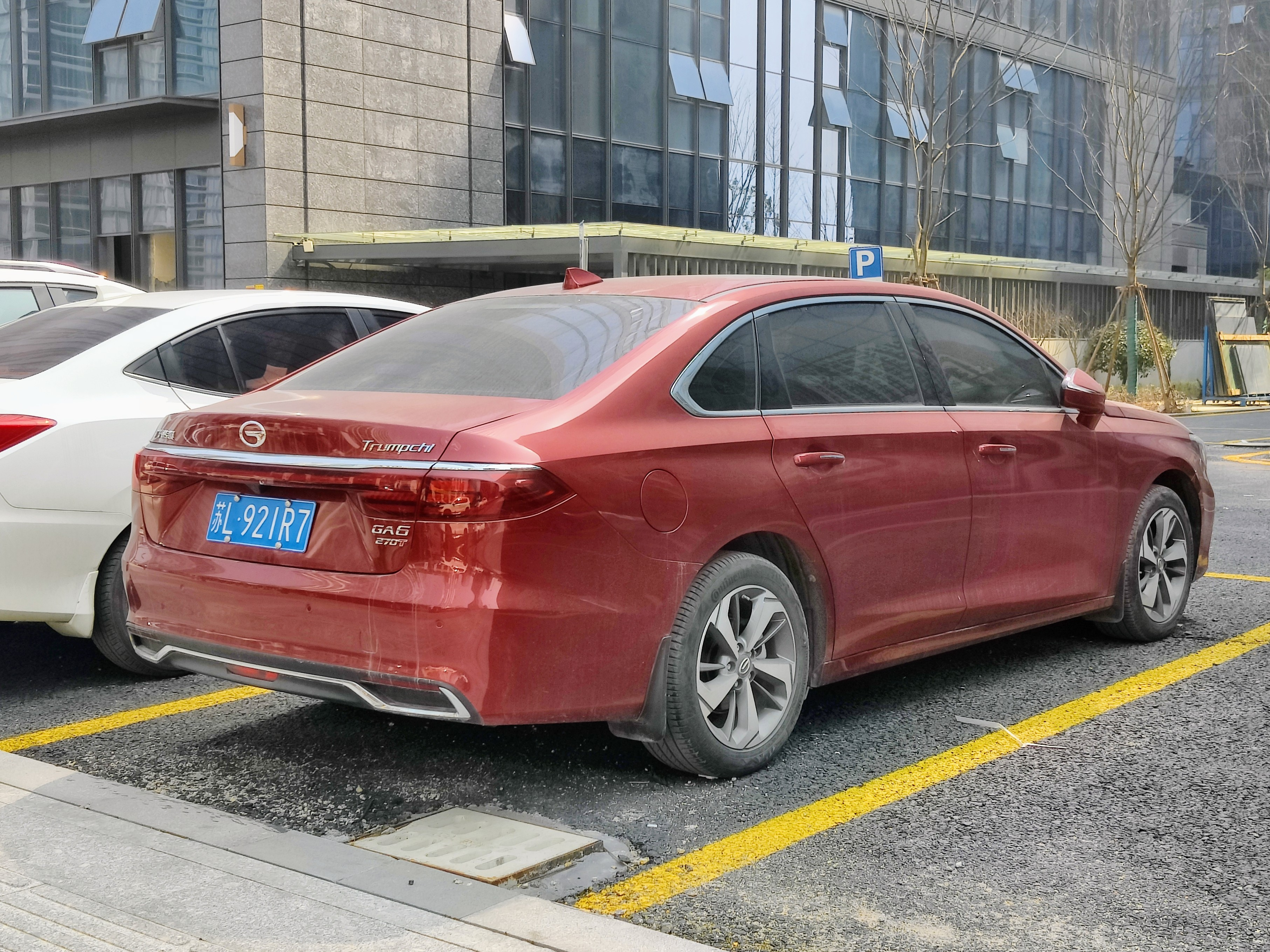
Trumpchi GA6 II rear.

=== Powertrain ===
Specs
Model	Years	Transmission	Power@rpm	Torque@rpm	0–100 km/h (0–62 mph) (Official)	Top speed
GA6	2019–2023	6-speed automatic	124 kW (169 PS; 166 hp) at 5,000 rpm	265 N⋅m (195 lb⋅ft; 27 kg⋅m) at 1,700–4,000 rpm	10.5s	200 km/h (124 mph)

== Sales ==
Year	China
2023	958
2024	7
2025	105

== See also ==
- List of GAC vehicles
