= GAC Enverge =

Chinese compact electric SUV concept

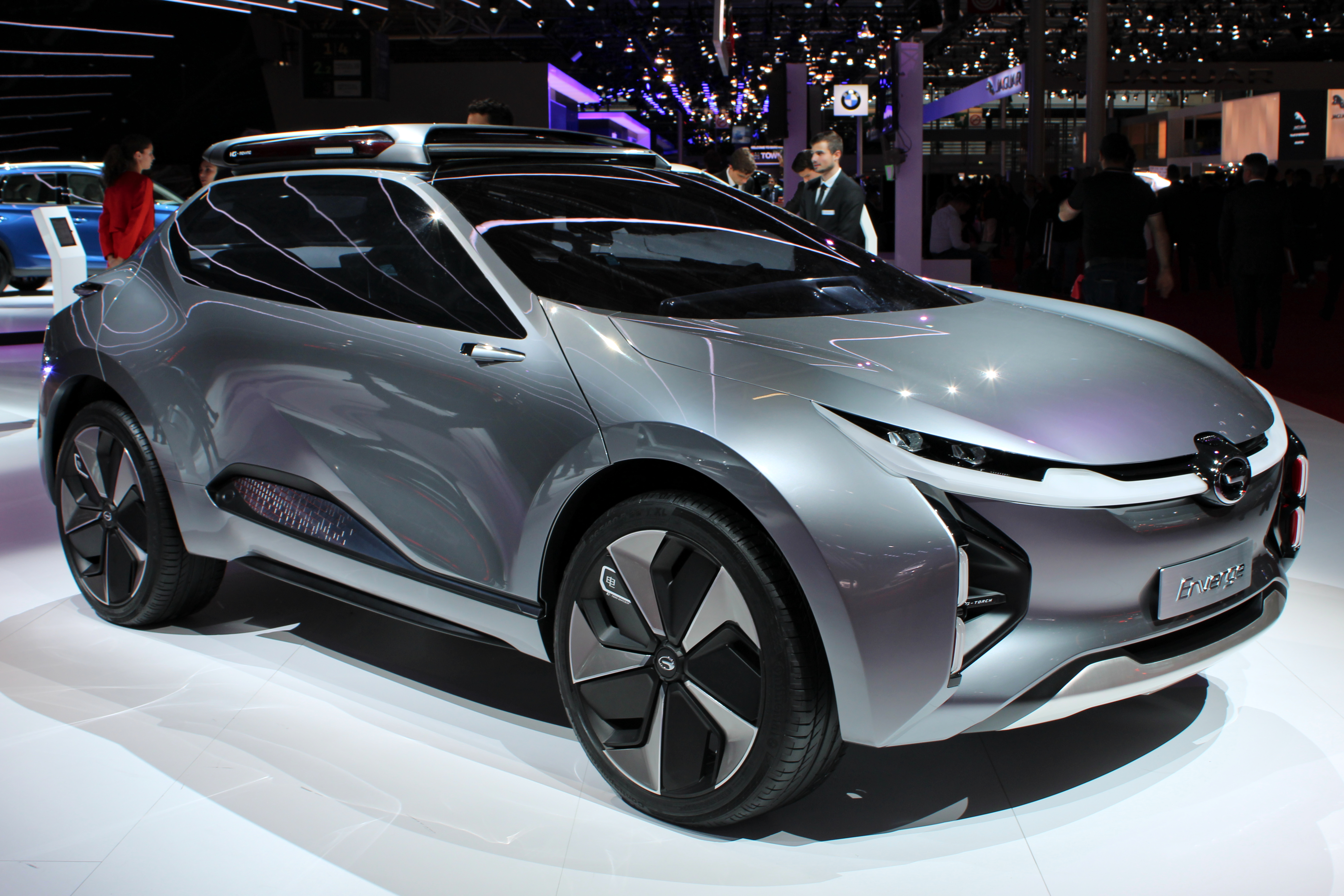
- 2018 Trumpchi Enverge concept at the 2018 Paris Motor Show, front

Overview
- Manufacturer: GAC Group
- Production: 2018

Body and chassis
- Class: Compact SUV
- Body style: 3-door hatchback

Powertrain
- Battery: 71 kWh battery

The GAC Enverge is an electric compact SUV concept revealed by Chinese automobile manufacturer GAC Group at the 2018 North American International Auto Show.

== Overview ==
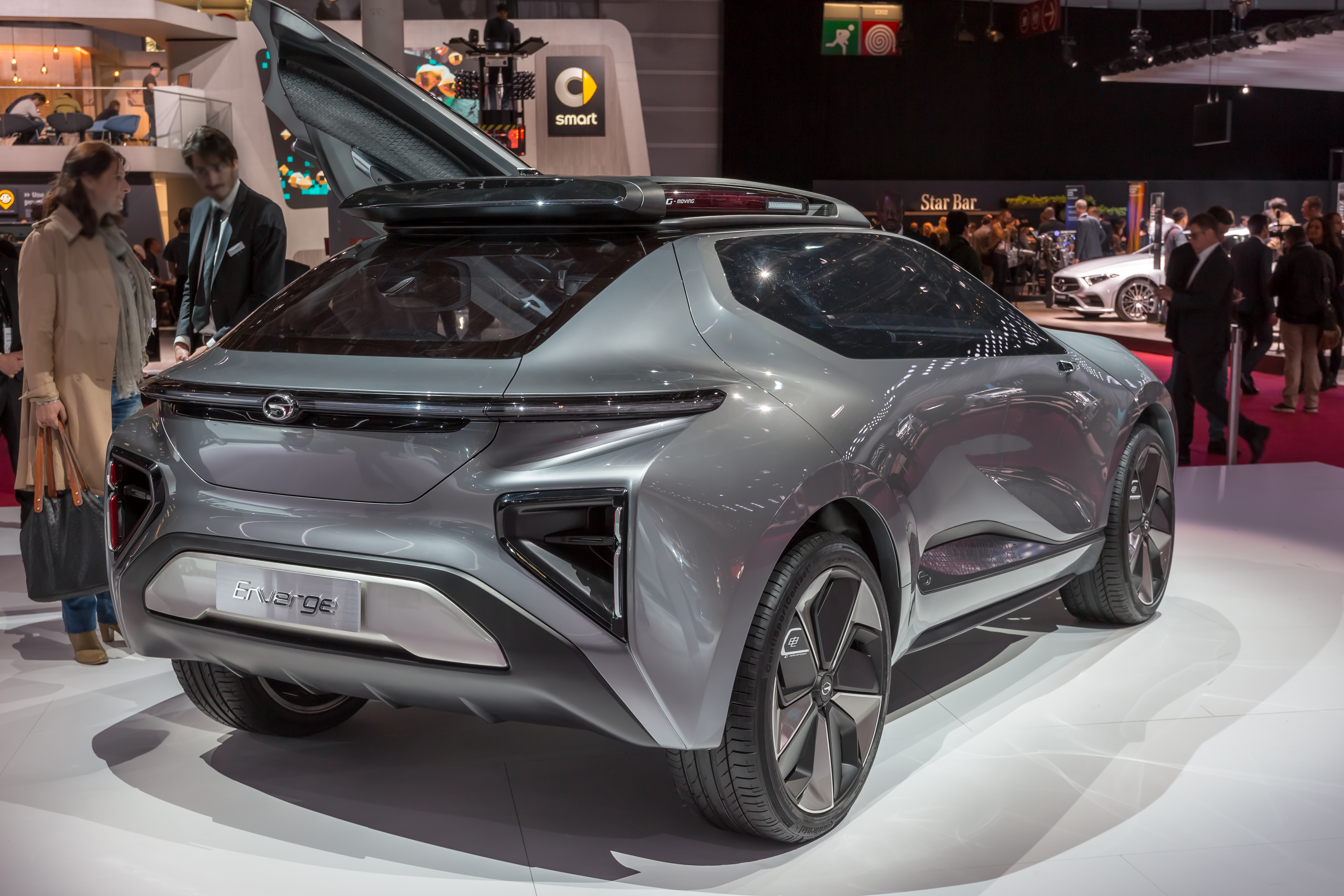
Rear view

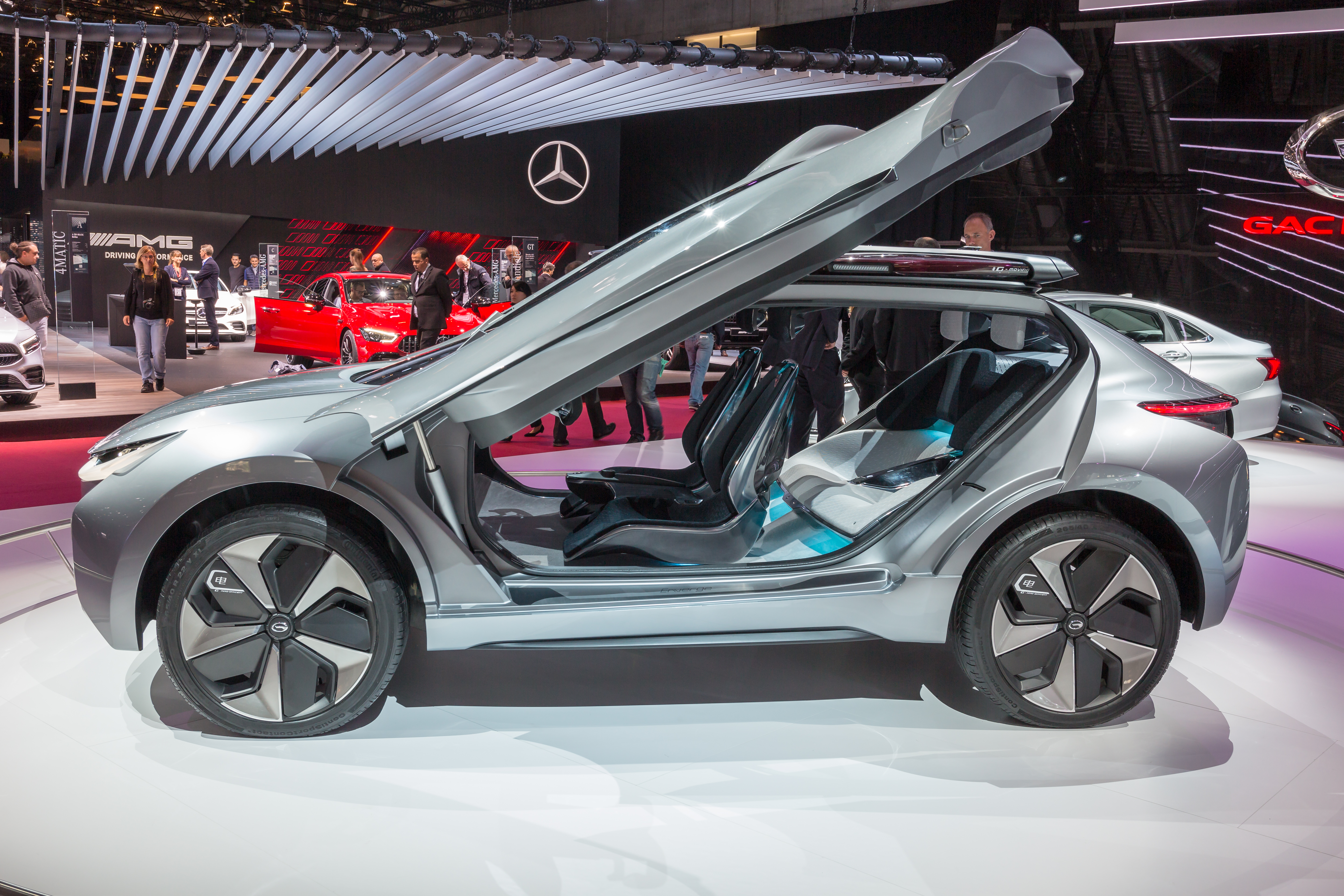
Side view with doors open

The GAC Enverge concept was first shown at the 2018 North American International Auto Show in Detroit, Michigan, United States alongside an array of Trumpchi brand models, which were revealed to preview GAC's potential 2019 entry into the U.S. car market. The Enverge made a European debut at the 2018 Paris Motor Show alongside the second-generation Trumpchi GS5 compact crossover SUV.

== Specifications ==
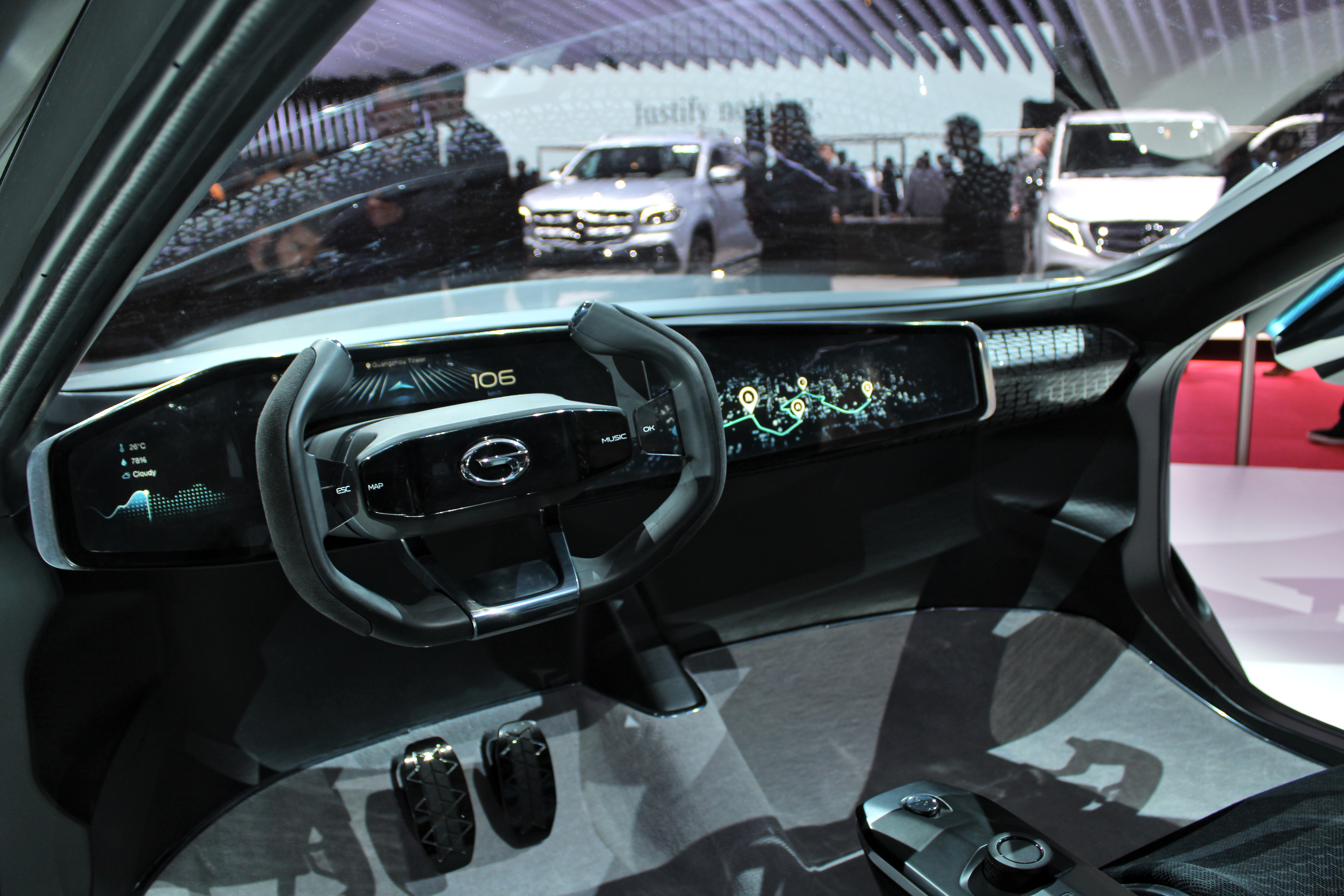
Interior

=== Battery ===
The GAC Enverge concept is powered by a 71 kWh battery, giving the car a range which GAC claims to be over 370 mi (600 km). The car can receive 240 mi (390 km)-worth of charge in 20 minutes.

=== Design ===
The Enverge has two scissor doors and a 2+2 seating layout.
