= Trumpchi GA8 =

Chinese full-size sedan

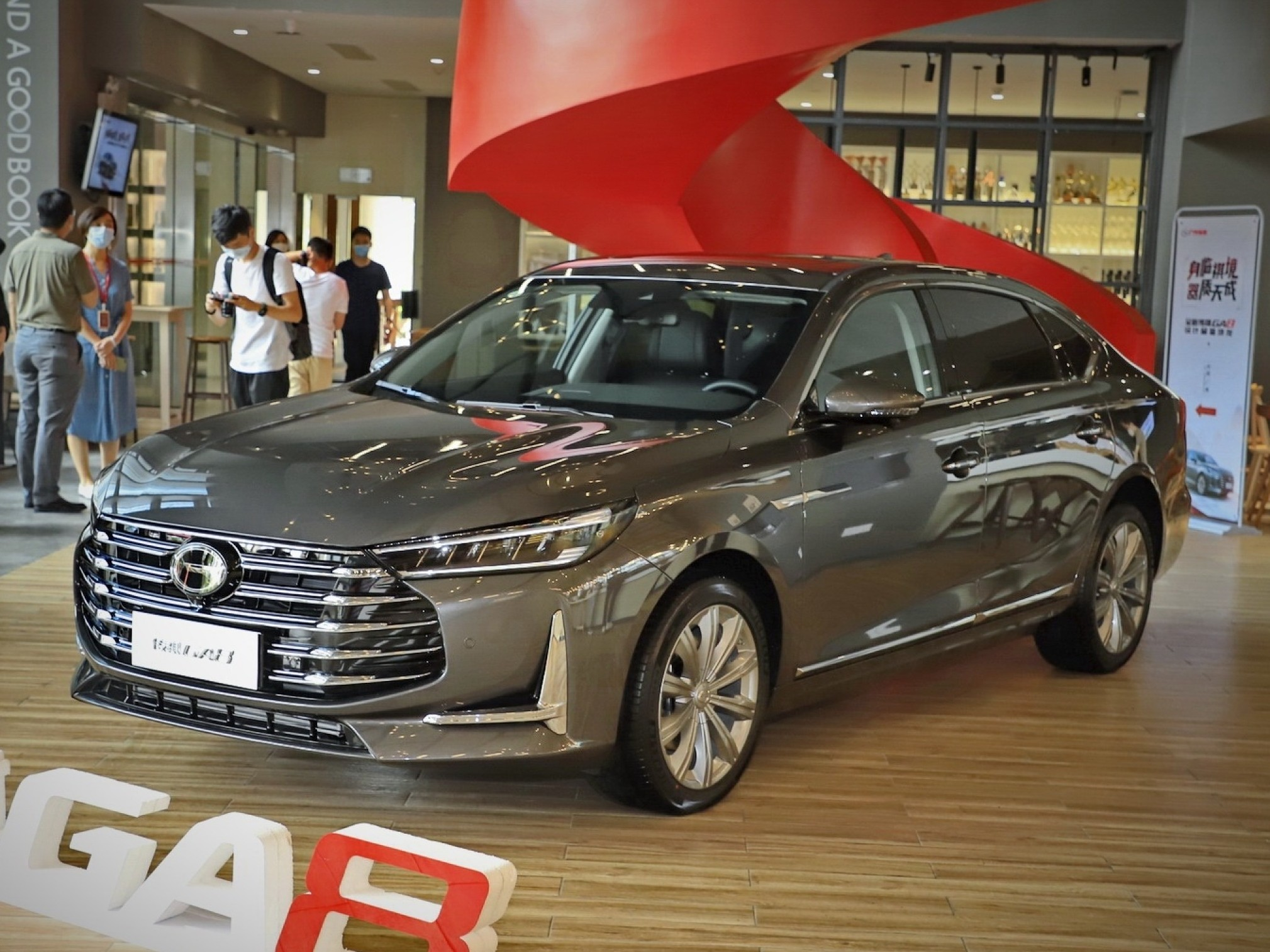
- Trumpchi GA8 II

Overview
- Manufacturer: Trumpchi (GAC)
- Also called: GAC GA8
- Production: 2016–2023

Body and chassis
- Class: Full-size car
- Body style: 4-door sedan
- Layout: Front-engine, front-wheel-drive

The Trumpchi GA8 is a full-size/executive sedan produced by GAC Group under the Trumpchi brand in China and the GAC Motor brand globally.

== First generation (2016) ==
Trumpchi GA8
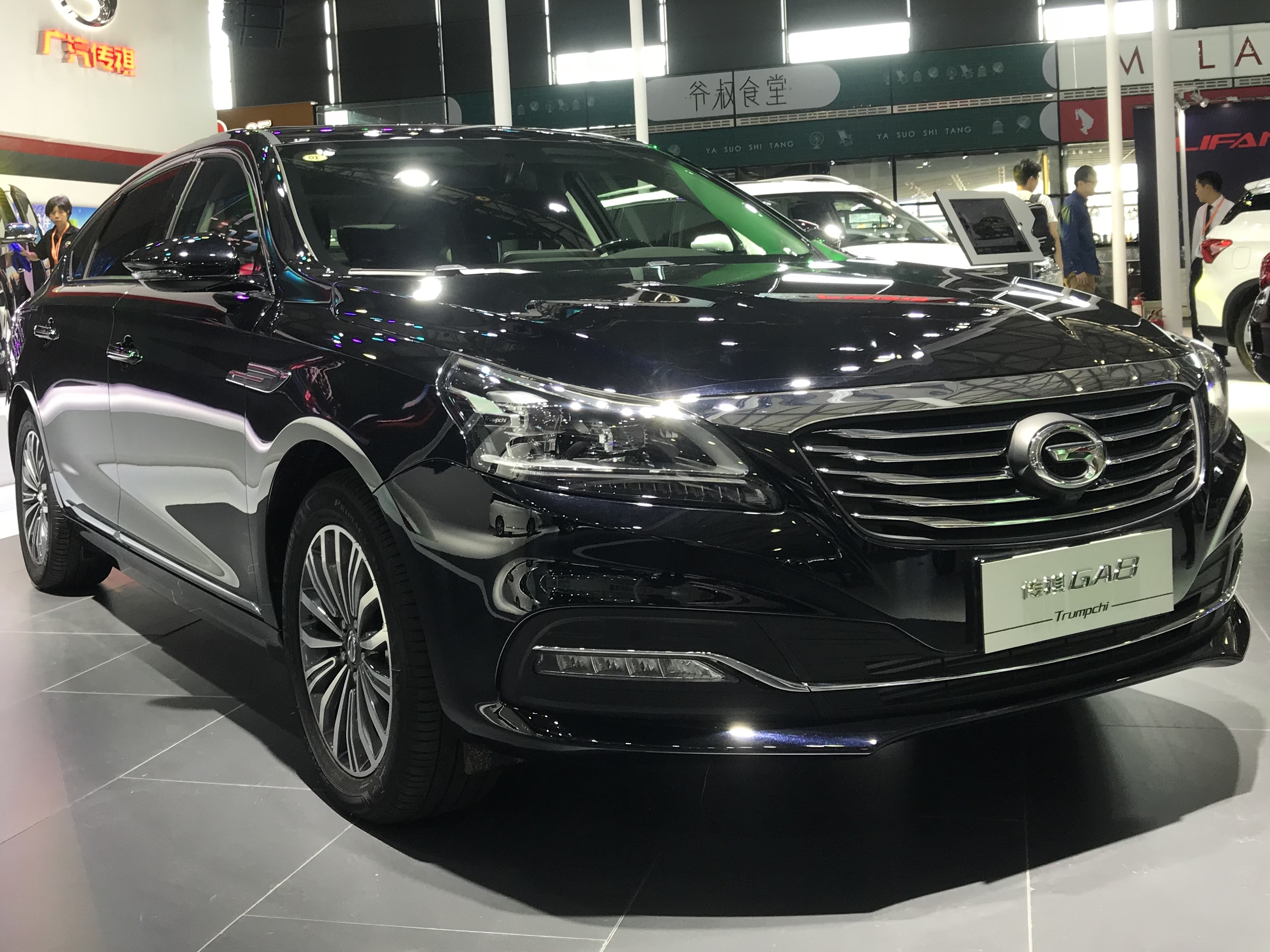

Overview
- Manufacturer: GAC Group
- Also called: GAC GA8
- Production: 2016–2019
- Assembly: Guangzhou, China

Body and chassis
- Class: Full-size car / Executive car (E)
- Body style: 4-door sedan
- Layout: Front-engine, front-wheel-drive

Powertrain
- Engine: Petrol: 1.8 L 4B18M2 turbo I4; 2.0 L 4B20M1 turbo I4
- Power output: 138 kW (188 PS; 185 hp) (1.8 L); 145 kW (197 PS; 194 hp) (2.0 L)
- Transmission: 6-speed Aisin automatic

Dimensions
- Wheelbase: 2,907 mm (114.4 in)
- Length: 5,003 mm (197.0 in)
- Width: 1,910 mm (75.2 in)
- Height: 1,508 mm (59.4 in)
- Curb weight: 1,705–1,810 kg (3,759–3,990 lb)

Previewed by the Trumpchi GA8 concept during the 2015 Shanghai Auto Show, the production version debuted in April 2016.

Pricing of the GA8 ranges from 149,800 yuan to 259,800 yuan.

The GA8 is powered by a 2.0-litre turbo four-cylinder engine with 197 hp (200 PS; 147 kW) and 300 N⋅m (30.6 kg⋅m; 221 lb⋅ft), mated to a six-speed automatic transmission. 0 to 100 km/h (0 to 62 mph) acceleration is 7.9 seconds and top speed is 225 km/h (140 mph). The GA8 2.0-litre turbo is designated as the 320T. A 1.8-litre turbo engine was also available.

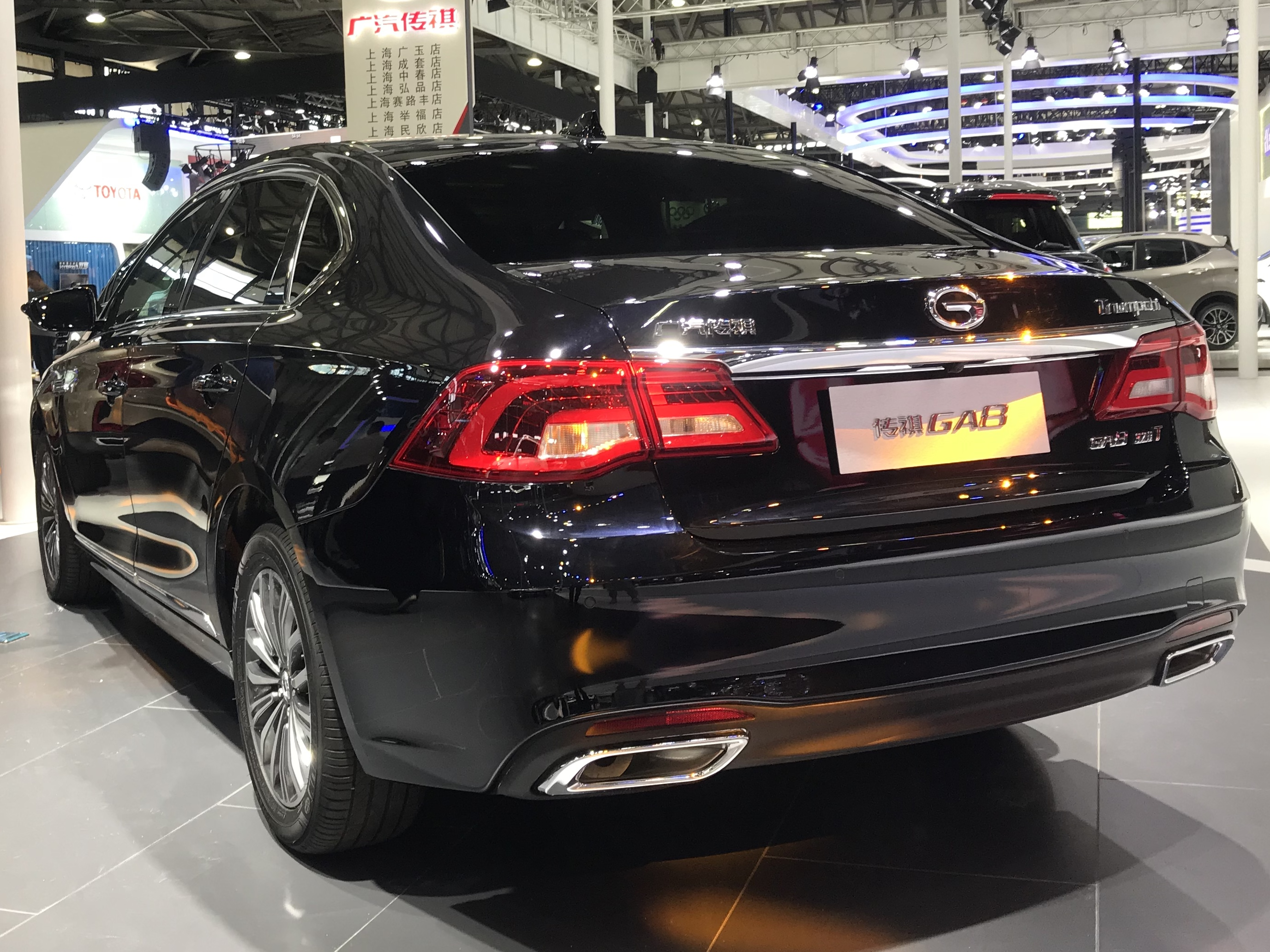
Trumpchi GA8 rear

=== Powertrain ===
Specs
Model	Years	Transmission	Power@rpm	Torque@rpm	0–100 km/h (0–62 mph) (Official)	Top speed
GA8	2017–2020	6-speed automatic	138 kW (188 PS; 185 hp) at 5,500 rpm	280 N⋅m (207 lb⋅ft; 29 kg⋅m) at 1,750–4,500 rpm		
GA8	2016–2020	6-speed automatic	145 kW (197 PS; 194 hp) at 5,200 rpm	320 N⋅m (236 lb⋅ft; 33 kg⋅m) at 1,750–4,000 rpm	7.9s	225 km/h (140 mph)

== Second generation (2020) ==
Trumpchi GA8
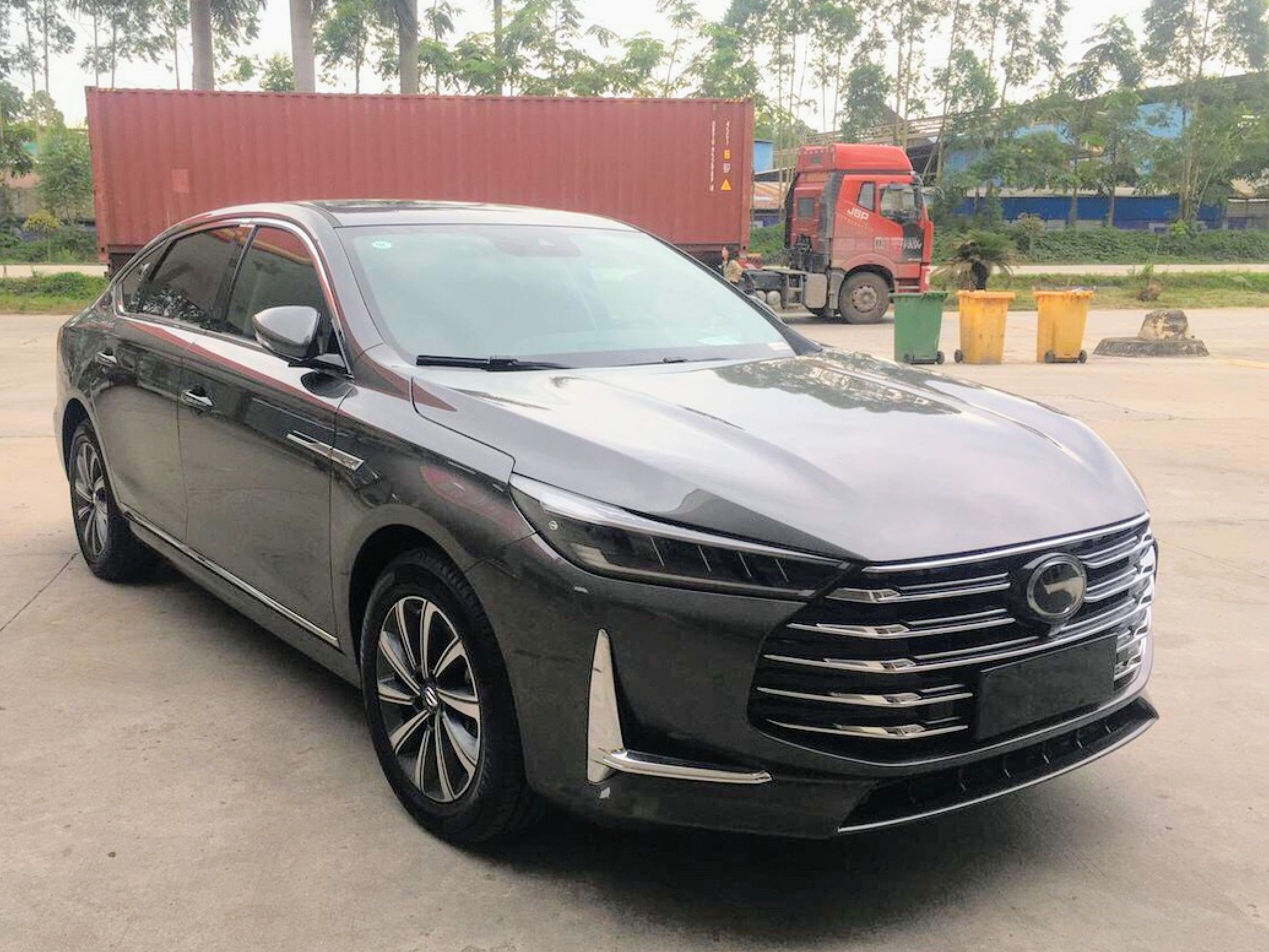
- Trumpchi GA8 II

Overview
- Manufacturer: GAC Group
- Also called: GAC GA8
- Production: 2020–2023
- Assembly: Guangzhou, China
- Designer: Xiao Lin

Body and chassis
- Class: Full-size car/Executive car (E)
- Body style: 4-door sedan
- Layout: Front-engine, front-wheel-drive

Powertrain
- Engine: Petrol: 2.0 L 4B20J1 turbo I4
- Power output: 185 kW (252 PS; 248 hp)
- Transmission: 6-speed Aisin automatic

Dimensions
- Wheelbase: 2,900 mm (114.2 in)
- Length: 5,003 mm (197.0 in)
- Width: 1,868 mm (73.5 in)
- Height: 1,505 mm (59.3 in)
- Curb weight: 1,705–1,730 kg (3,759–3,814 lb)

The second generation of GA8 was revealed during the 2020 Beijing Auto Show. Both the exterior and interior was redesigned. The updated interior features a redesigned dashboard with a minimalist design. Most of the buttons were moved above the center airconditioning vents. A digital upgrade was also added, with the analog instrument cluster being replaced by a 12.3-inch display and beside it is a 12.3-inch touchscreen infotainment system in the center.

The second generation GA8 is equipped with the Trumpchi third-generation 390T engine. The turbocharged 2.0-litre engine produces 185 kW (252 PS; 248 hp) and 390 N⋅m (39.8 kg⋅m; 288 lb⋅ft) torque, mated to a 6-speed automatic transmission. According to GAC, the top speed is 210 km/h (130 mph) and has a fuel economy of 7.8 L/100 km (12.8 km/L; 36.2 mpg_{‑imp}; 30.2 mpg_{‑US}). The range-topping model of GA8 retails for 226,800 yuan in China.

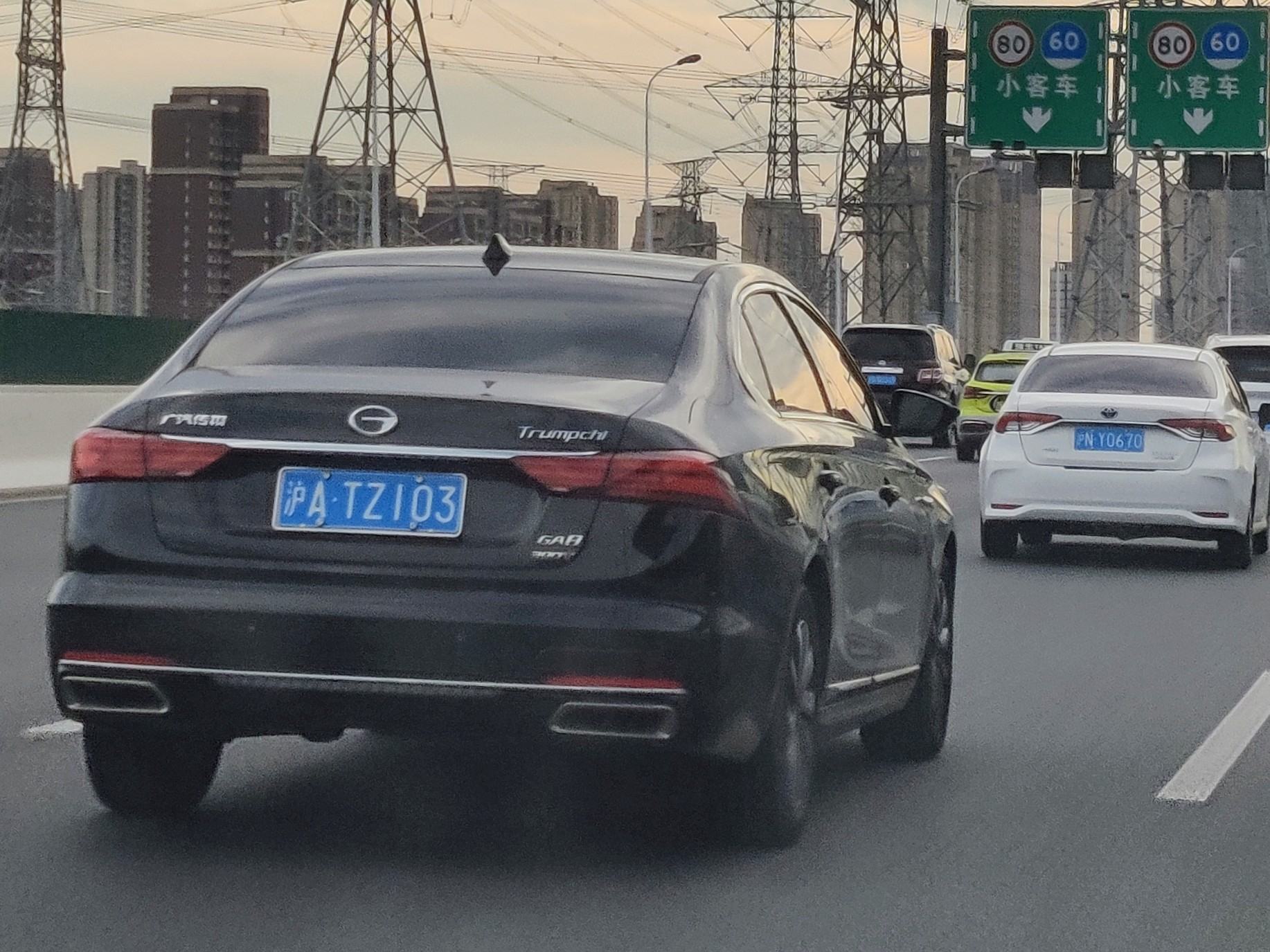
Trumpchi GA8 2021MY rear

=== Powertrain ===
Specs
Model	Years	Transmission	Power@rpm	Torque@rpm	0–100 km/h (0–62 mph) (Official)	Top speed
GA8	2020–2023	6-speed automatic	185 kW (252 PS; 248 hp) at 5,250 rpm	390 N⋅m (288 lb⋅ft; 40 kg⋅m) at 1,750–4,000 rpm	7.8s	210 km/h (130 mph)

== Sales ==
Year	China
2023	243
2024	1

== See also ==
- List of GAC vehicles
