= GAC Yue 7 =

Plug-in hybrid mid-size SUV

Overview
- Manufacturer: GAC Motor
- Model code: T75
- Also called: Trumpchi Yue 7; GAC XT80 (GCC)
- Production: 2026–present
- Assembly: China: Guangzhou

Body and chassis
- Class: Mid-size SUV
- Body style: 5-door SUV
- Layout: Front-engine, front-wheel-drive; Front-engine, all-wheel-drive
- Chassis: Unibody

Powertrain
- Engine: Petrol plug-in hybrid: 1.5 L 4A15J4 turbo I4
- Electric motor: 205 kW TZ210XYT751 PMSM (front); 220 kW TZ220XYYX11 PMSM (rear)
- Transmission: 2-speed DHT
- Battery: 28.3 kWh LFP Zenergy; 45.975 kWh NMC CATL
- Electric range: 116–189 km (72–117 mi) (WLTP); 161–261 km (100–162 mi) (CLTC)

Dimensions
- Wheelbase: 2,900 mm (114.2 in)
- Length: 4,999–5,045 mm (196.8–198.6 in)
- Width: 2,004 mm (78.9 in)
- Height: 1,916–1,933 mm (75.4–76.1 in)
- Curb weight: 2,330–2,510 kg (5,137–5,534 lb)

The GAC Yue 7, also called the Trumpchi Yue 7 (Chinese: 传祺越7; pinyin: chuánqí yuè 7) in China or GAC XT80 in export markets, is a plug-in hybrid mid-size SUV produced by GAC Group under the Trumpchi brand in China.

== Overview ==
The Yue 7 was first teased with official camouflaged pictures of the vehicle undergoing cold-weather testing on 6 April 2026, with GAC mentioning its T75 codename. The Yue 7 made its debut at the 2026 Beijing Auto Show, with additional information revealed in June 2026 through MIIT filings. Pre-orders for the model opened on 2 September 2026, and it went on sale later that month on 22 September.

Development for the project was approved on 22 November 2024, with a total project budget of CN¥ 512.65 million (US$74.48 million).

Unibody chassis with front double wishbone and five-link independent rear suspension geometries. The top variant is equipped with continuous damping control and dual-chamber air suspension with variable ground clearance between 180–270 mm (7.1–10.6 in), enabling approach and departure angles of 33° and 35° compared to the steel spring version's 30° and 33°, respectively; all variants have a breakover angle of 26°. GAC Trumpchi says the chassis has 38,000N·m/° torsion stiffness which is supplemented with 2200MPa A-pillar reinforcements. The standard all-wheel drive variant is rated for a wading depth of 700 mm (27.6 in), increasing to 780 mm (30.7 in) for the top variant. The all-wheel drive variants have a maximum gradeability of 75%, while the parking brake is rated for 70%.

The 1.1-meter panoramic remote display serving as the instrument panel at the base of the windshield, supplemented by a cluster of3 small gauge style displays located behind the steering wheel, and a 15.6-inch central infotainment touchscreen, powered by a Qualcomm Snapdragon 8838 SoC and running the ADiGO 7.0 operating system. The rear seats are power adjustable fore and aft by 170 mm (6.7 in) and can recline to up to 127°. It has an openable panoramic sunroof with sunshade and a 5.7 L (0.20 cu ft) refrigerator compartment with a temperature range of −6–50 °C (21–122 °F). It has a 1.9 m (6.2 ft) long bed mode which can be activated with one button press and without the need to remove seat headrests. The interior has 8 magnetic accessory attachment points and two 220-volt household power outlets, and the vehicle has 37 expansion interfaces in total.

The standard variants have a basic Level 2 ADAS system with a sensor suite consisting of one mmWave radar, 5 cameras, and 12 ultrasonic sensors. The top variant has an advanced ADAS system capable of NOA in urban and highway conditions, and has a sensor suite consisting of a 192-line roof-mounted LiDAR, 3 mmWave radars, 11 cameras, and 12 ultrasonic sensors.

== Powertrain ==
The Yue 7 is available exclusively with GAC Trumpchi's GMC 3.0 plug-in hybrid powertrain.

All variants use a 1.5-liter turbocharger inline-4 petrol engine outputting 161 hp (120 kW; 163 PS) (167 hp (125 kW; 169 PS) gross rating) at 5,500 rpm and 245 N⋅m (181 lb⋅ft) of torque from 2,500–4,000 rpm, and is paired with a 2-speed series-parallel DHT driving the front wheels alongside a 275 hp (205 kW; 279 PS) permanent magnet synchronous motor. All-wheel drive variants add a 295 hp (220 kW; 299 PS) permanent magnet motor to the rear axle, for a total of 570 hp (425 kW; 578 PS). The all-wheel drive variants have a maximum wheel torque of 10,000 N⋅m (7,376 lb⋅ft) with rear locking differential standard with optional front axle differential lock, plus a virtual center differential lock.

The base front-wheel drive variant uses a 28.3 kWh LFP battery which provides 116 km (72 mi) of WLTP electric range and can recharge from 30–80% in 18 minutes. All other variants use a 46.0 kWh NMC battery supplied by CATL which provides up to 189 km (117 mi) of WLTP electric range and can recharge from 30–80% in 15 minutes.

Specifications
Battery		Engine		Motor		Electric range		30–80% charge	0–100 km/h (62 mph)	Top speed	Kerb weight
Type	Weight	Power	Torque	Power	Torque	WLTP	CLTC	30–80% charge	0–100 km/h (62 mph)	Top speed	Kerb weight
28.3 kWh LFP Zenergy	255 kg (562 lb)	161 hp (120 kW; 163 PS) at 5,500 rpm	245 N⋅m (181 lb⋅ft) at 2,500–4,000 rpm	205 kW (275 hp; 279 PS)	360 N⋅m (266 lb⋅ft)	116 km (72 mi)	161 km (100 mi)	18 min	7.5 sec	200 km/h (124 mph)	2,330 kg (5,137 lb)
45.975 kWh NMC CATL	278 kg (613 lb)	161 hp (120 kW; 163 PS) at 5,500 rpm	245 N⋅m (181 lb⋅ft) at 2,500–4,000 rpm	205 kW (275 hp; 279 PS)	360 N⋅m (266 lb⋅ft)	189 km (117 mi)	261 km (162 mi)	15 min	7.5 sec	200 km/h (124 mph)	2,510 kg (5,534 lb)
45.975 kWh NMC CATL	278 kg (613 lb)	161 hp (120 kW; 163 PS) at 5,500 rpm	245 N⋅m (181 lb⋅ft) at 2,500–4,000 rpm	425 kW (570 hp; 578 PS)	745 N⋅m (549 lb⋅ft)	188 km (117 mi)	259 km (161 mi)	15 min	4.2 sec	200 km/h (124 mph)	2,510 kg (5,534 lb)
