= GAC Trumpchi =

Chinese automotive brand by GAC Group

GAC Trumpchi 广汽传祺
- Product type: Automobile
- Current owner: GAC Motor
- Country: China
- Introduced: December 2010; 15 years ago
- Related brands: Aion
- Markets: Asia; Africa; South America
- Website: gac-motor.com

GAC Trumpchi (Chinese: 广汽传祺; pinyin: Guǎngqì Chuánqí) is an automotive brand established by Chinese automaker GAC Group in 2010. The Trumpchi name is used within the domestic Chinese market, while vehicles are marketed internationally under the GAC Motor brand.

== Name ==
The brand's Western name is derived from its Chinese name, chuánqí (传祺), which means "spreading good fortune" and is a homophone for "legendary" (传奇). The resemblance to the name of U.S. President Donald Trump is coincidental.

Following the 2016 U.S. presidential election, the company reportedly considered changing its name for the American market due to the unexpected public response. Executives were surprised by the negative reactions received at the 2017 Detroit Auto Show and on social media. As a result, the brand was eventually renamed and is marketed as GAC Motor outside China.

== History ==
GAC began the construction of facilities to produce vehicles for a new own-brand automotive marque in 2008. The first Trumpchi model to go into production, the Trumpchi GA5 sedan, a four-door mid-size saloon car model based on the platform of the Alfa Romeo 166, went into mass production in September 2010. The first 500 Trumpchi sedans produced were delivered to the organizing committee of the 2010 Asian Games in October 2010.

The Trumpchi Sedan was formally unveiled to the public at Auto Guangzhou in December 2010, and public sales of the vehicles began in the same month. The Trumpchi GS5, a sport utility vehicle based on the same platform as the Trumpchi Sedan, was launched in March 2012.

The production version of the Trumpchi GA3 compact sedan was unveiled at the Shanghai Auto Show in April 2013.

In 2017, GAC planned to enter the United States auto market by late 2019 with the Trumpchi brand being launched in that country as GAC Motor due to the Trumpchi name used in the domestic Mainland Chinese auto market sounding too similar to US President Donald Trump and the Trump Organization as the Trumpchi name would most likely be targeted by potential lawsuits and other potential legal action filed in court by Trump and the Trump Organization against GAC for allegedly infringing and violating patents and trademarks regarding the "Trump" name that Trump and his Trump Organization hold sole exclusive rights to. The first vehicle planned to be launched in the US was slated to be the GAC GS8 SUV. The plans to launch GAC Motor in the United States was eventually cancelled due to the US-China trade war and US tariffs on Chinese products.

== Models ==
=== Current models ===
==== Sedan ====
- Empow (2021–present), compact sedan

==== SUV ====
- Emkoo (2023–present), compact SUV
- GS3 (2017–present), subcompact SUV
- GS4 (2015–present), compact SUV
- GS8 (2016–present), mid-size SUV
  - ES9 (2023–present), mid-size SUV, PHEV variant of GS8 II
- Xiangwang S7 (2025–present), mid-size SUV, PHEV
- Xiangwang S9 (2025–present), full-size SUV, PHEV
- Yue 7 (2026–present), full-size off-road SUV, PHEV

==== MPV ====
- E8 / Xiangwang E8 (2023–present), mid-size MPV, HEV/PHEV
- M6/M6 Pro (2018–present), compact MPV
- M8 / Xiangwang M8 (2017–present), full-size MPV, ICE/PHEV
  - E9 (2023–present), PHEV variant of M8
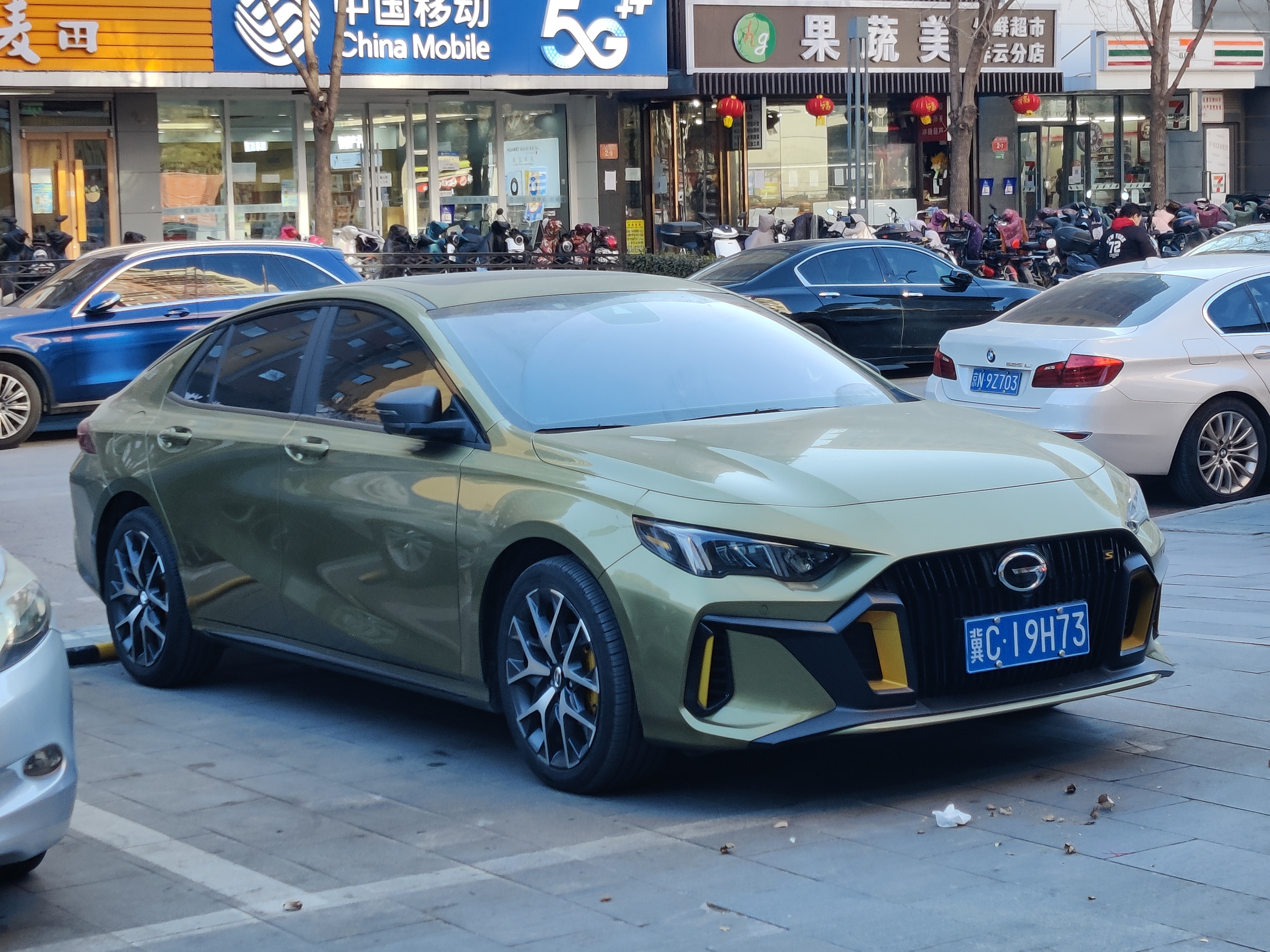
Trumpchi Empow

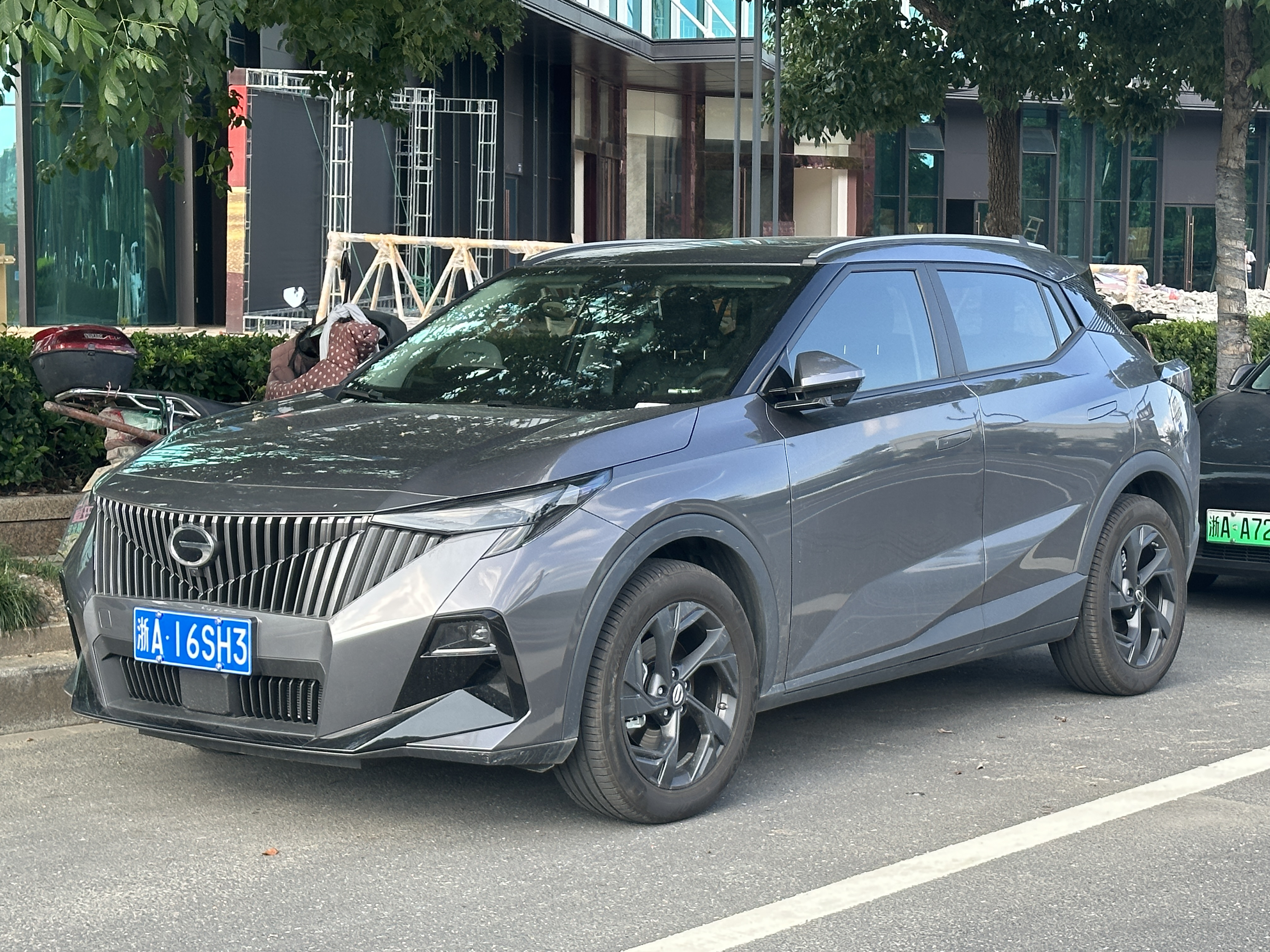
Trumpchi GS3 II

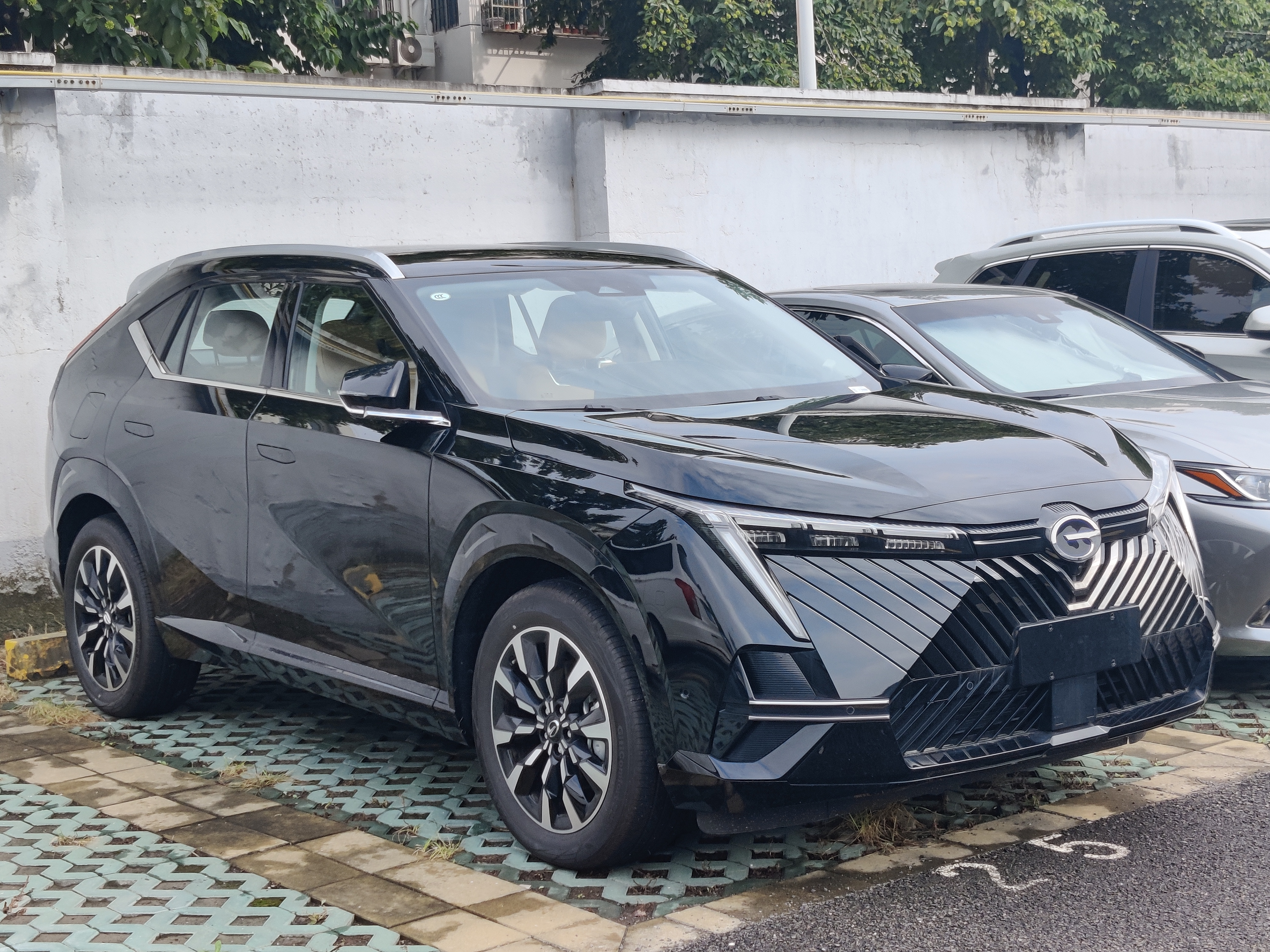
Trumpchi Emkoo

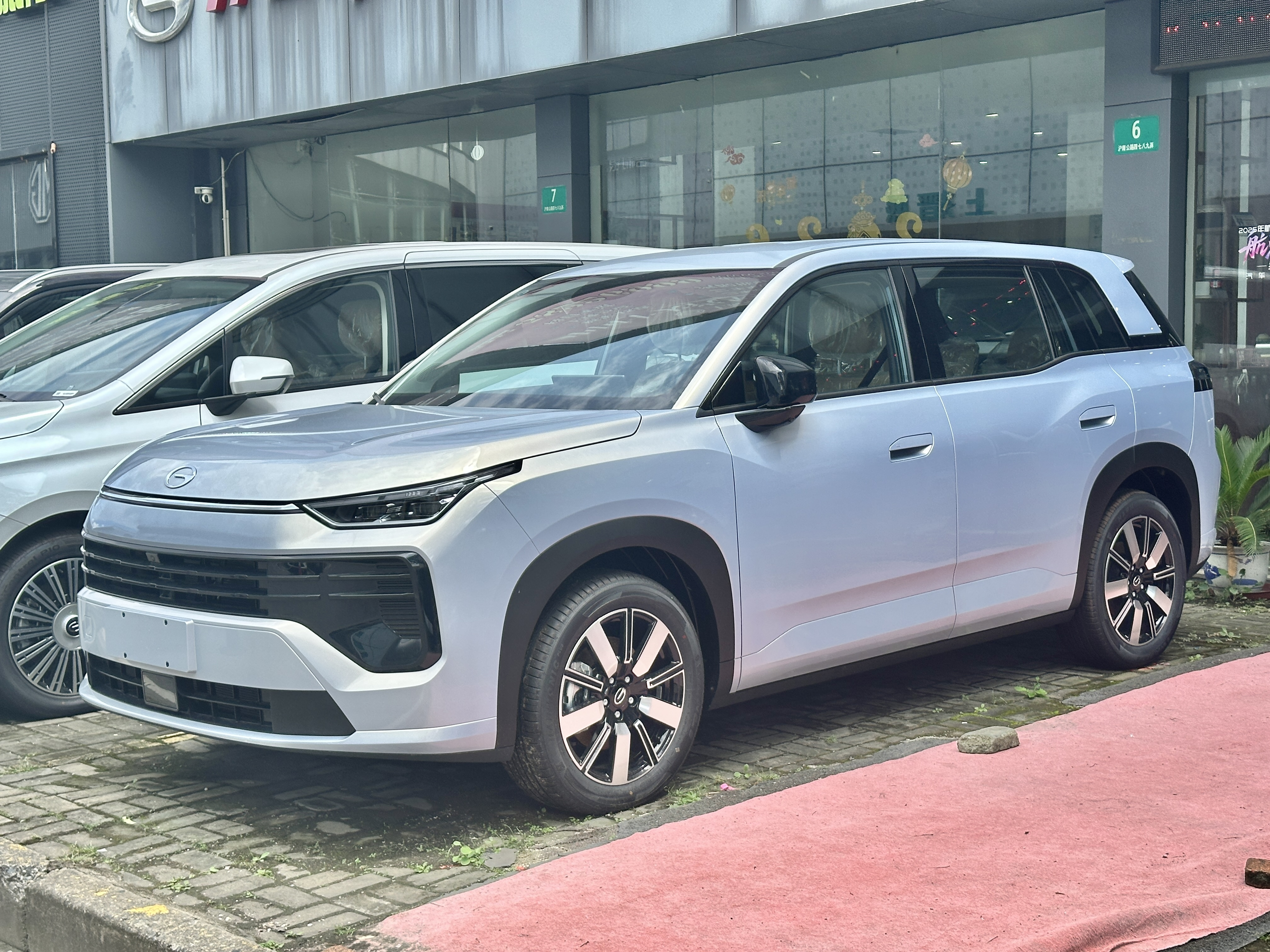
Trumpchi GS4 V

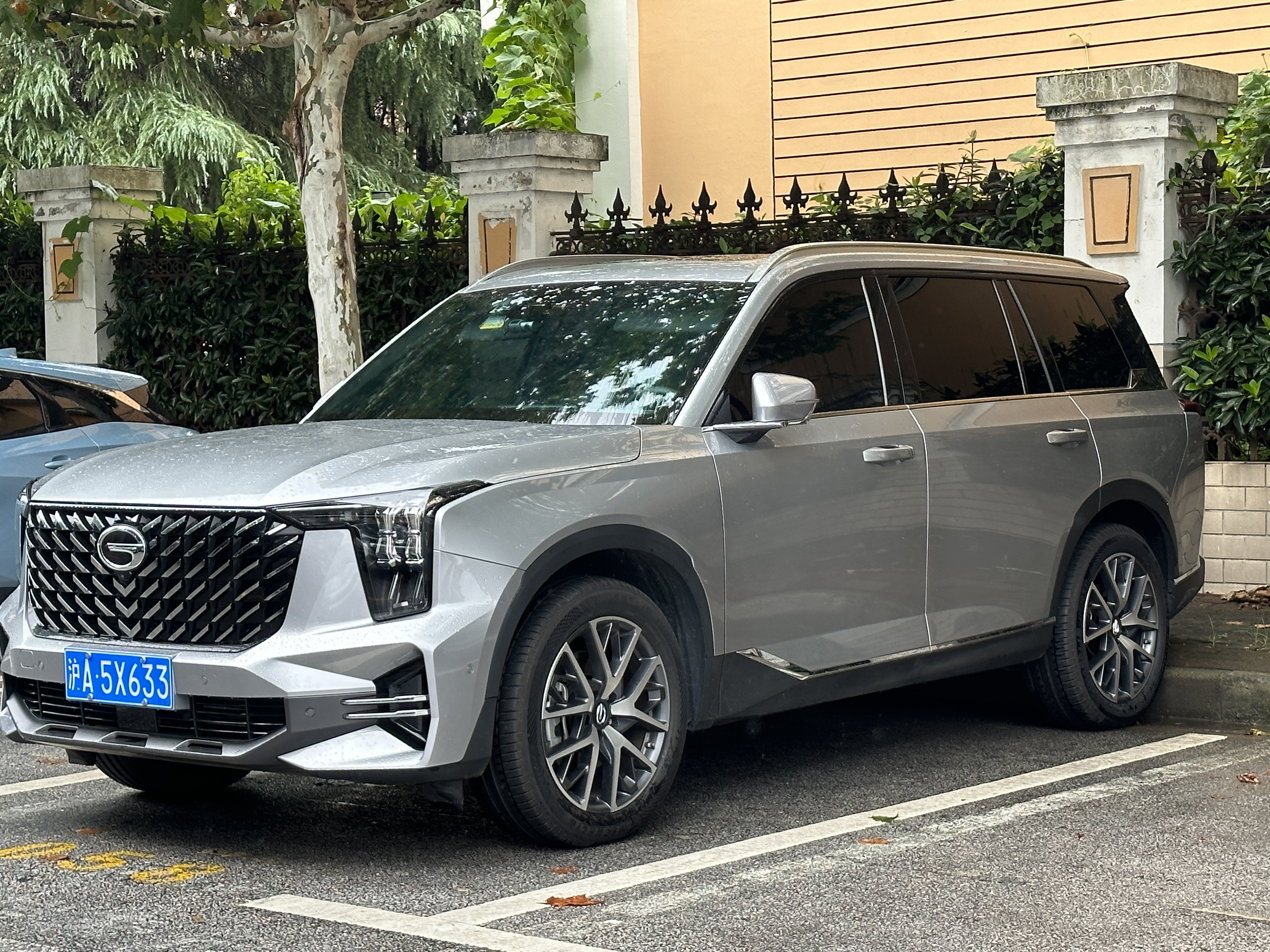
Trumpchi GS8 II

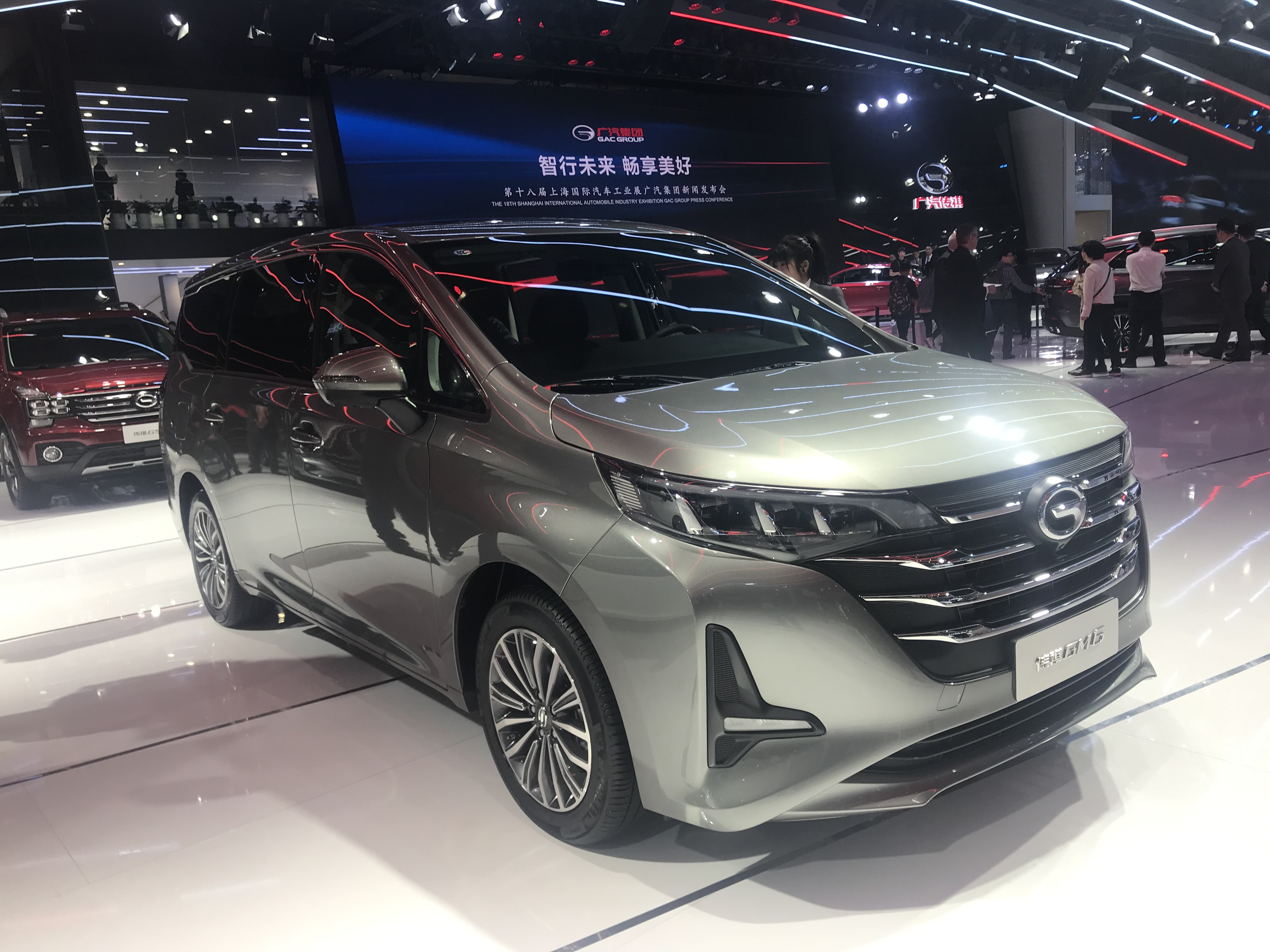
Trumpchi M6

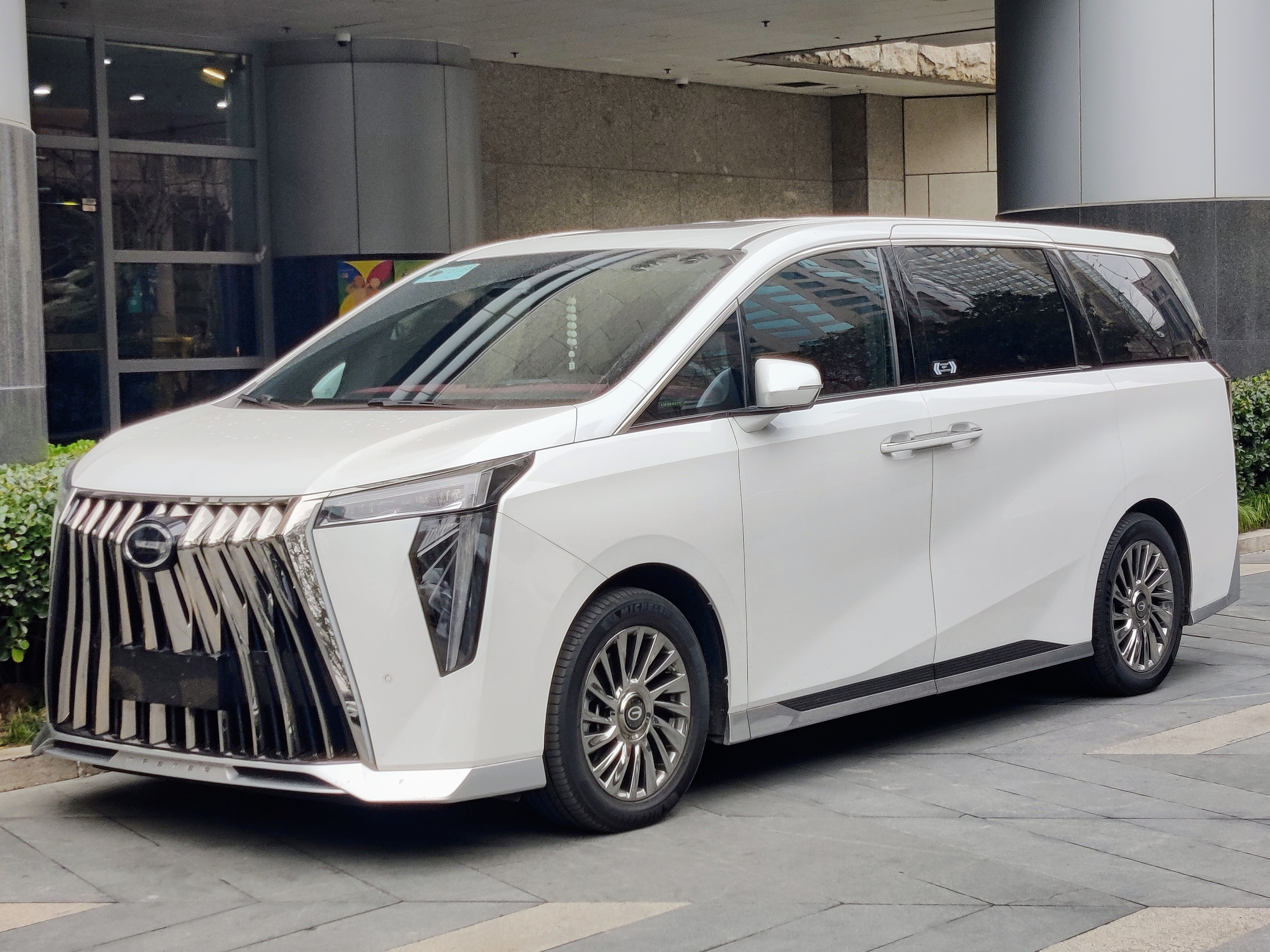
Trumpchi M8 II

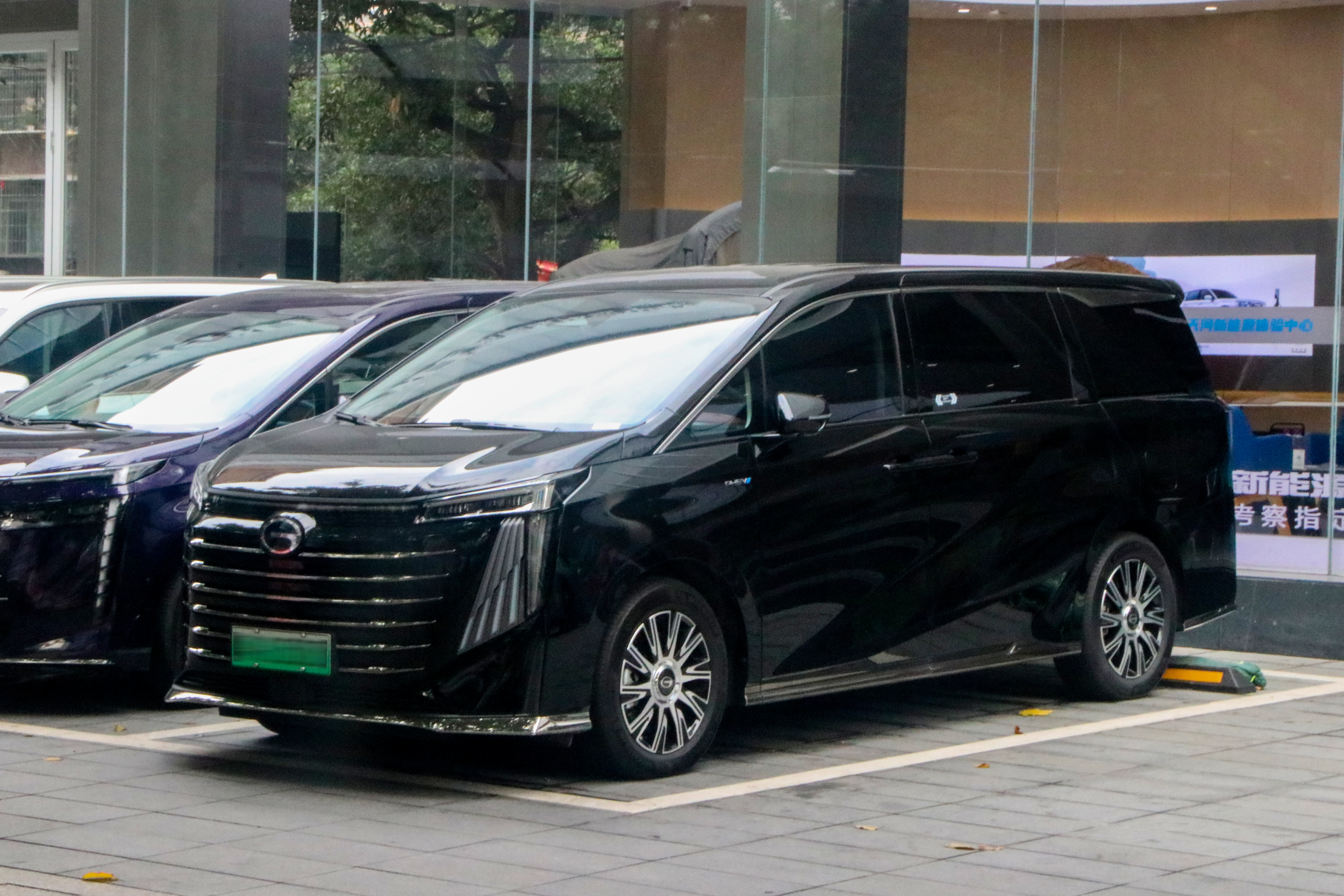
Trumpchi E9

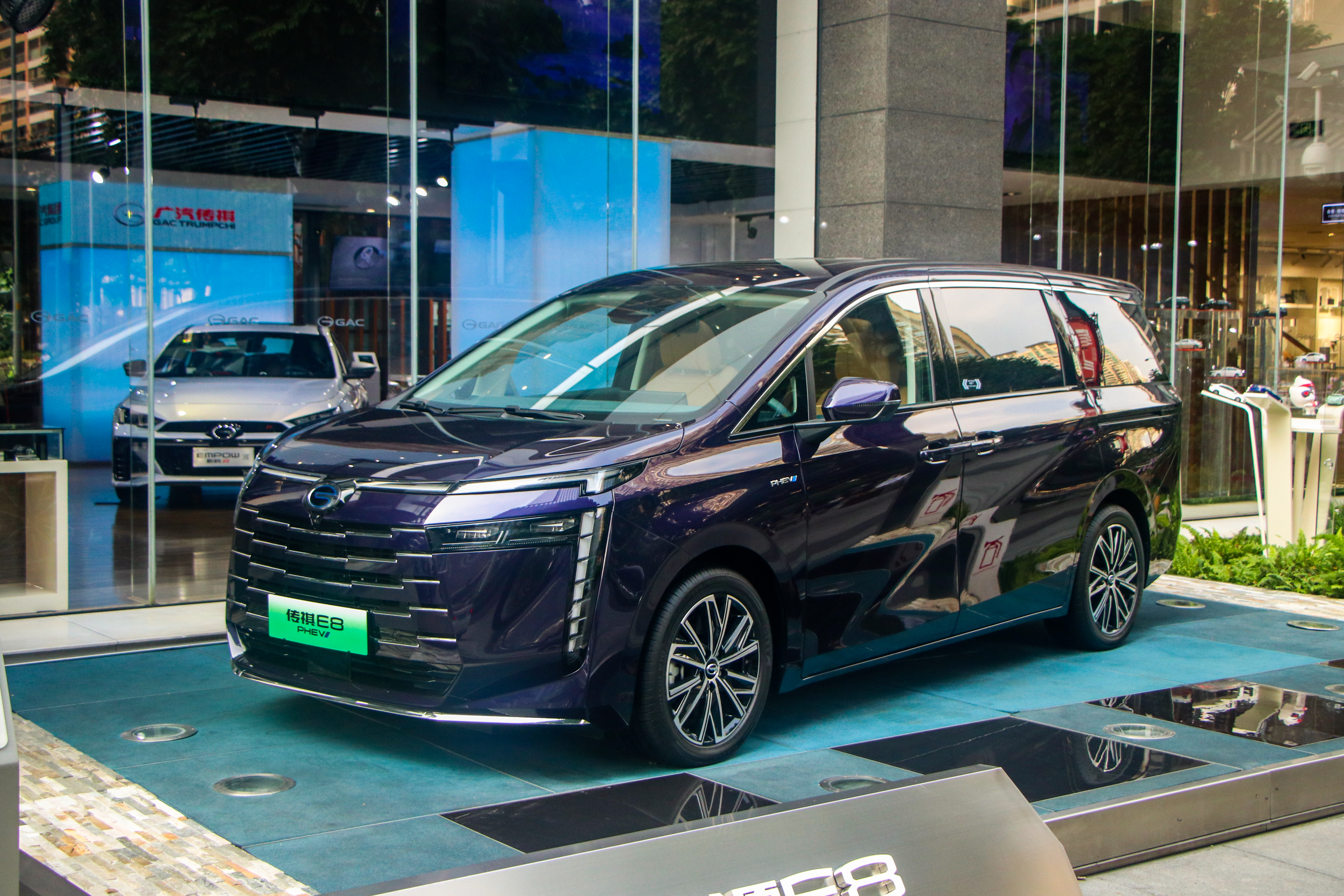
Trumpchi E8

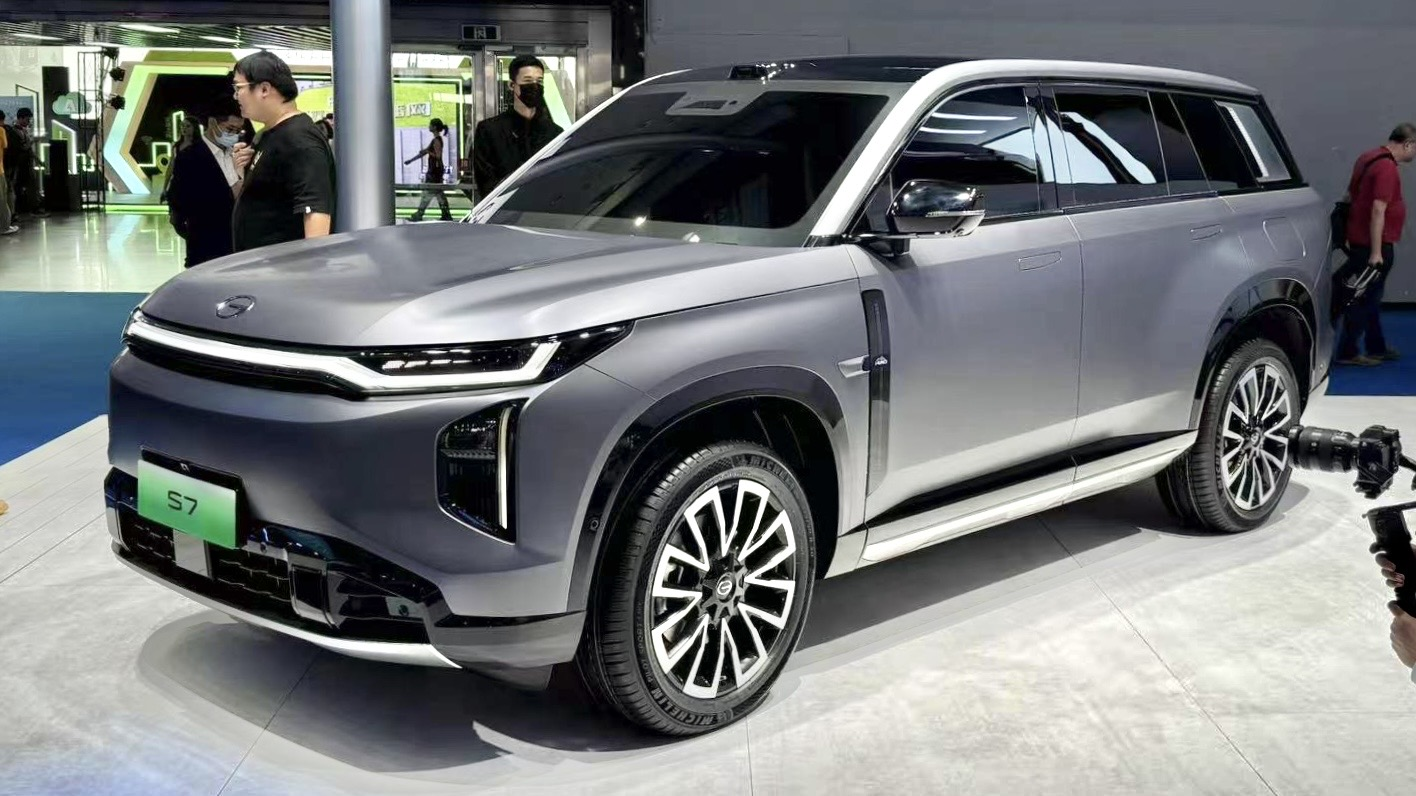
Trumpchi Xiangwang S7

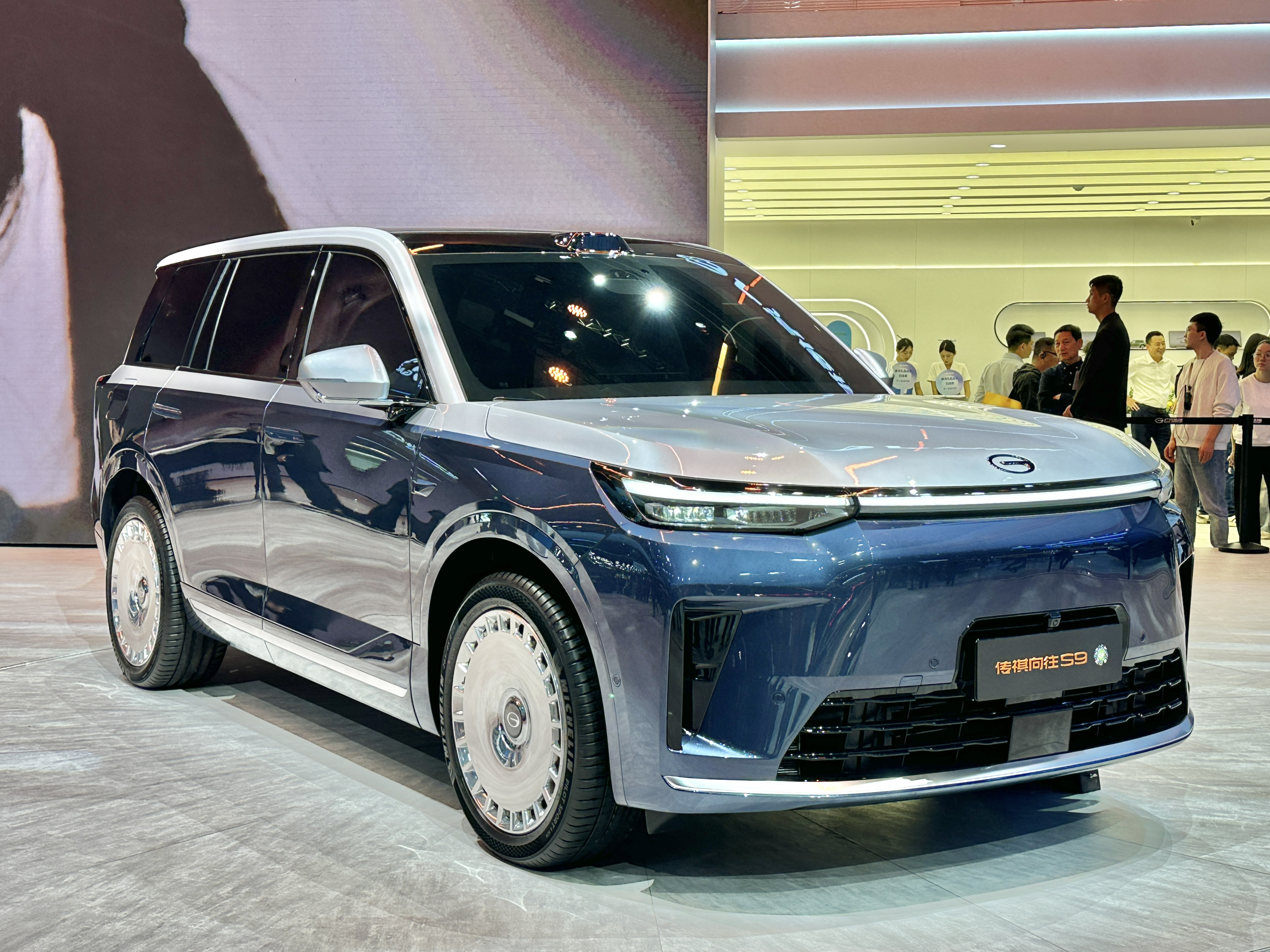
Trumpchi Xiangwang S9

=== Discontinued models ===
==== Sedan ====
- GA3 (2013–2014), subcompact sedan succeeded by the GA3S
  - GA3S (2014–2019), subcompact sedan replacing the GA3
    - GA3S PHEV (2016–2019), PHEV variant of the GA3S
- GA4 (2018–2022), compact sedan replacing the GA5
- GA5 (2010–2018), compact sedan succeeded by the GA4
  - GA5 PHEV (2014–2018), PHEV variant of the GA5
- GA6 (2014–2023), mid-size sedan
- GA8 (2015–2023), full-size sedan

==== SUV ====
- GE3 (2017–2020), electric variant of the GS3
- GS4 PHEV (2017–2022), PHEV variant of the GS4
- GS4 EV (2017–2019), compact SUV, electric variant of the GS4
- GS4 Coupe (2019–2023), compact fastback SUV variant of the GS4
- GS4 Plus (2021–2025), compact SUV
- GS5 (2011–2021), compact SUV, later renamed as GS4 Plus
- GS5S (2014–2018), compact SUV
- GS7/GS8S (2017–2021), mid-size SUV
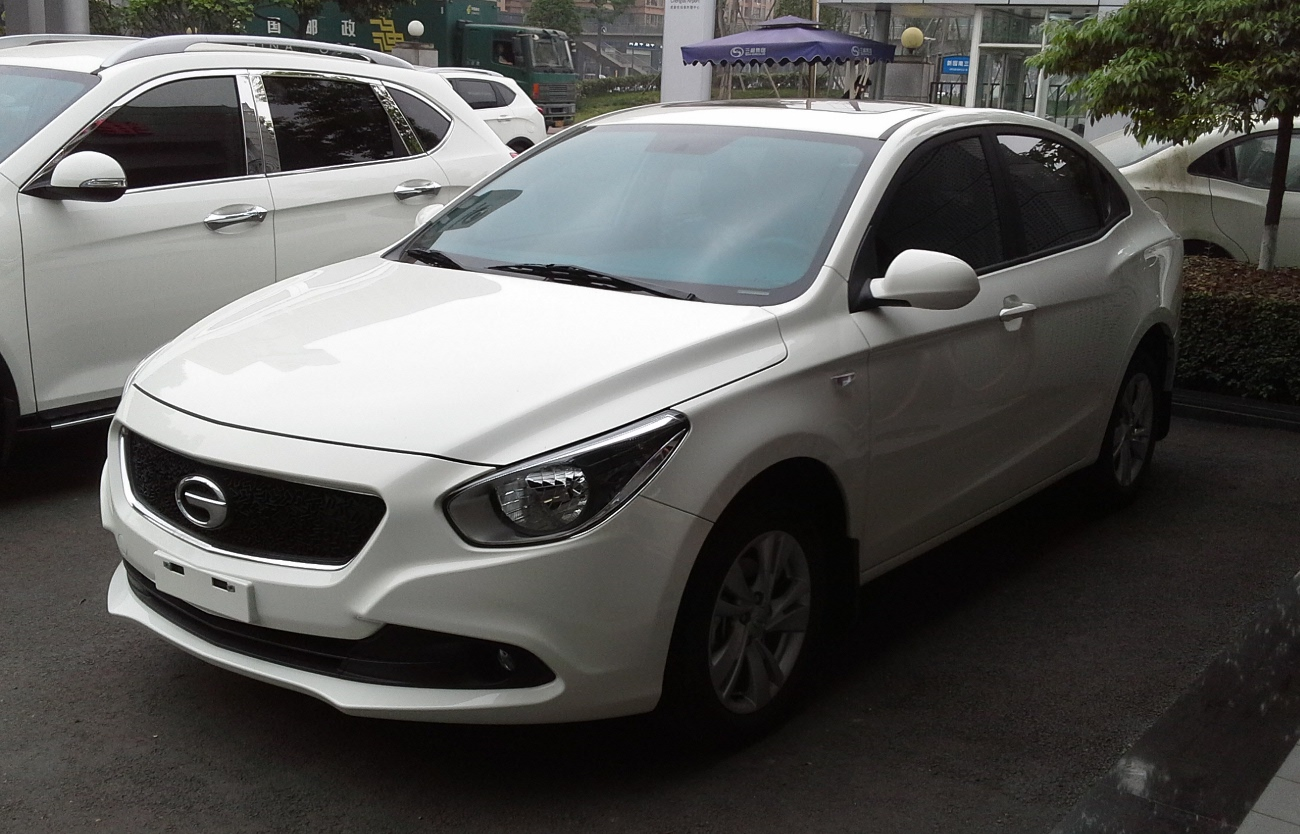
Trumpchi GA3

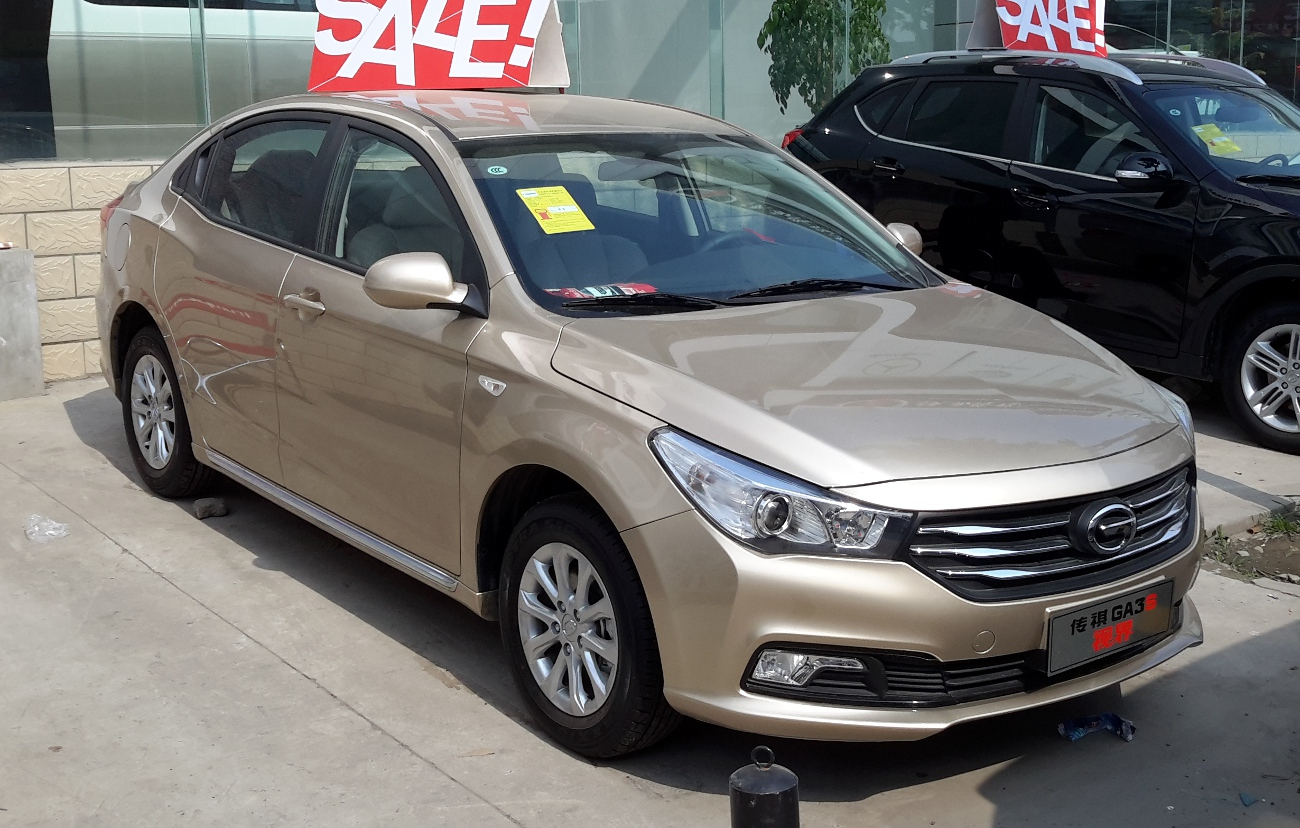
Trumpchi GA3S

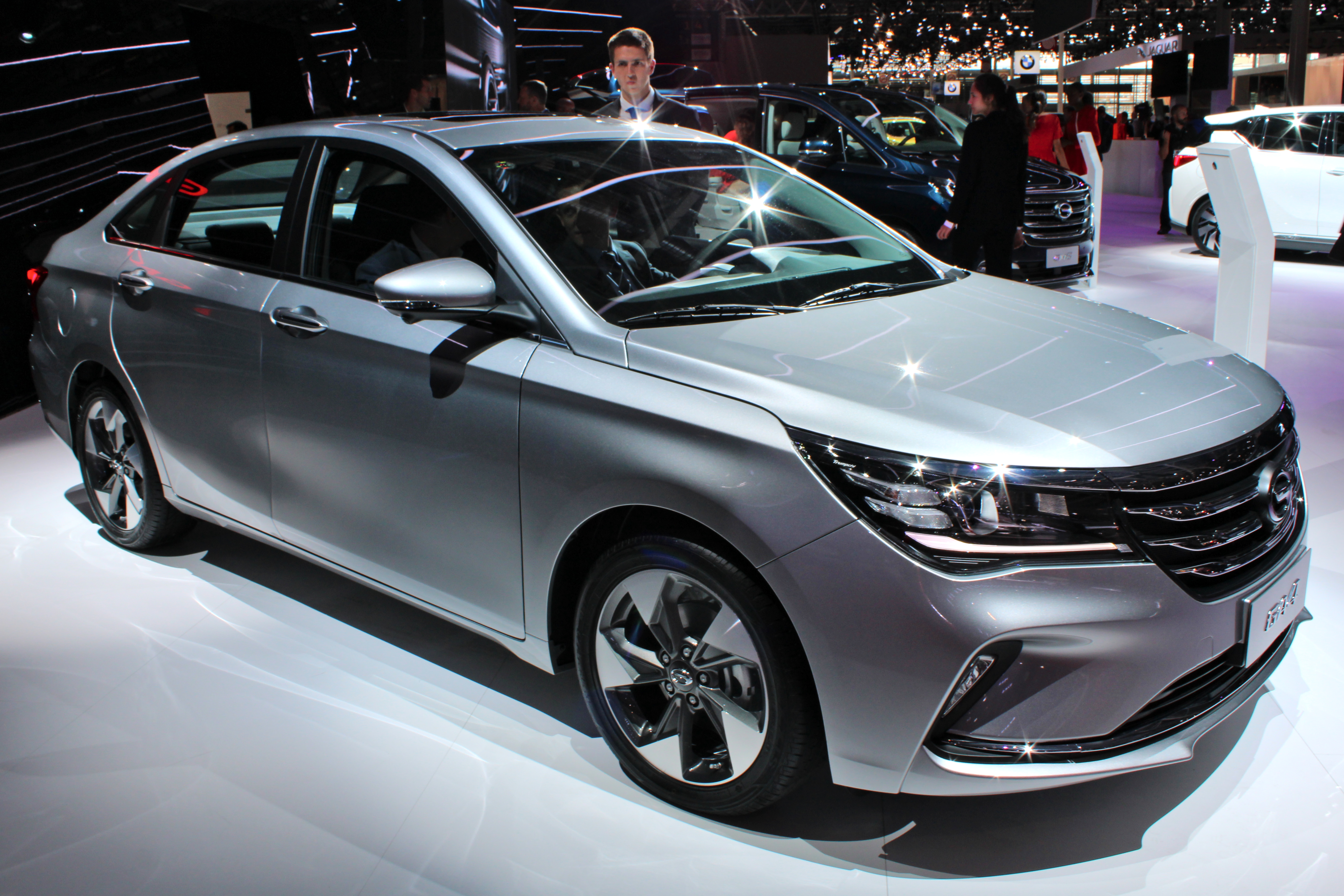
Trumpchi GA4

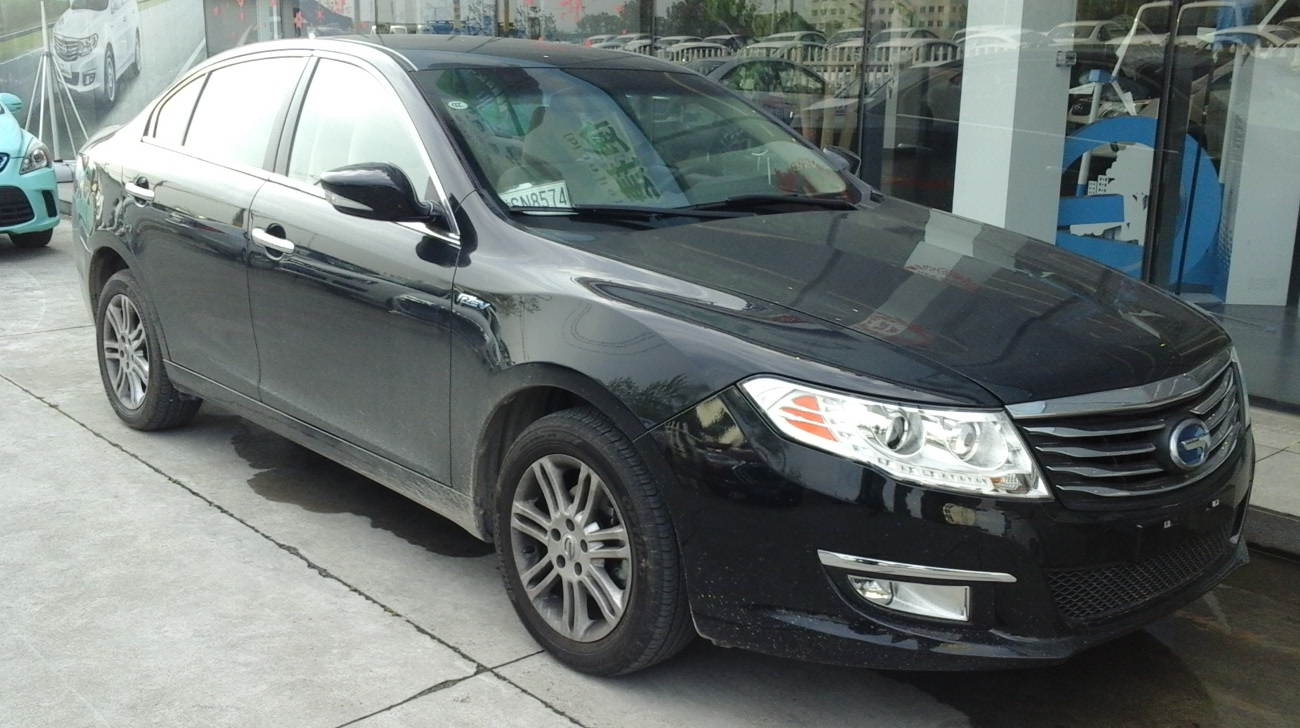
Trumpchi GA5

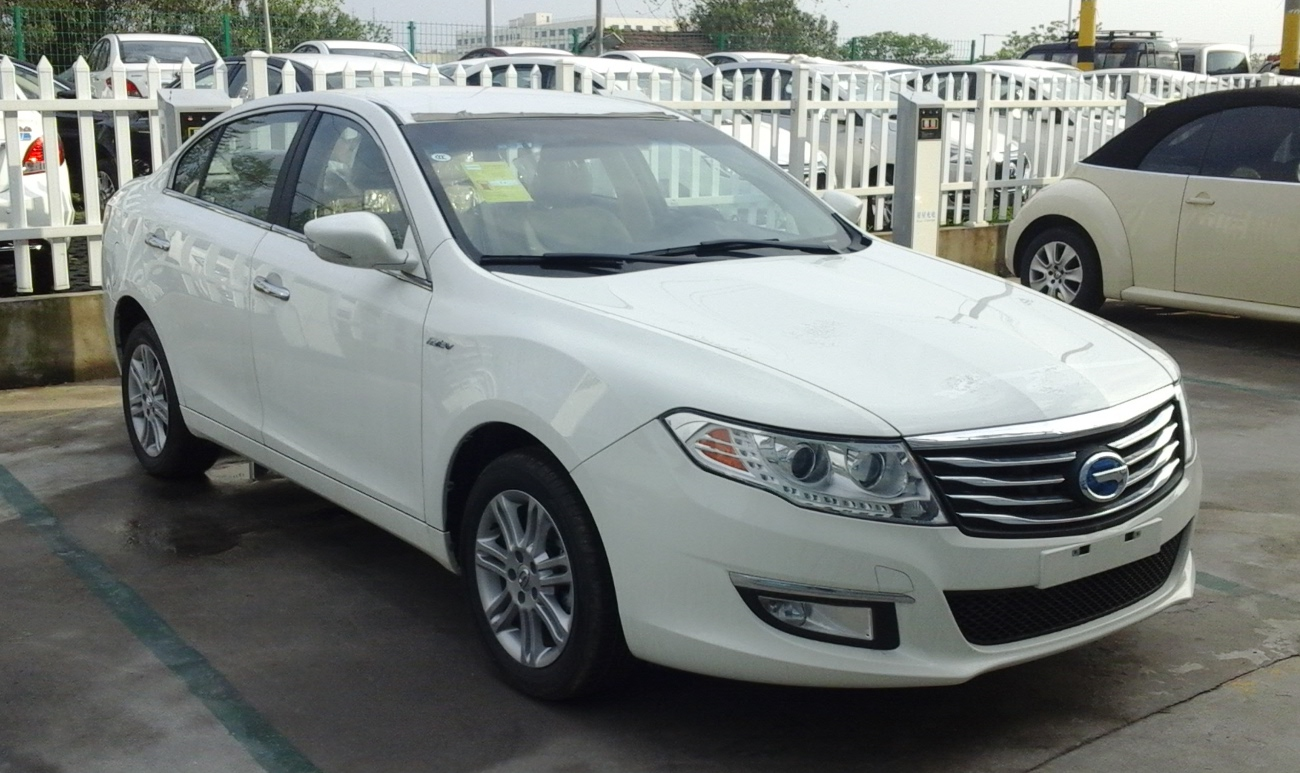
Trumpchi GA5 REV

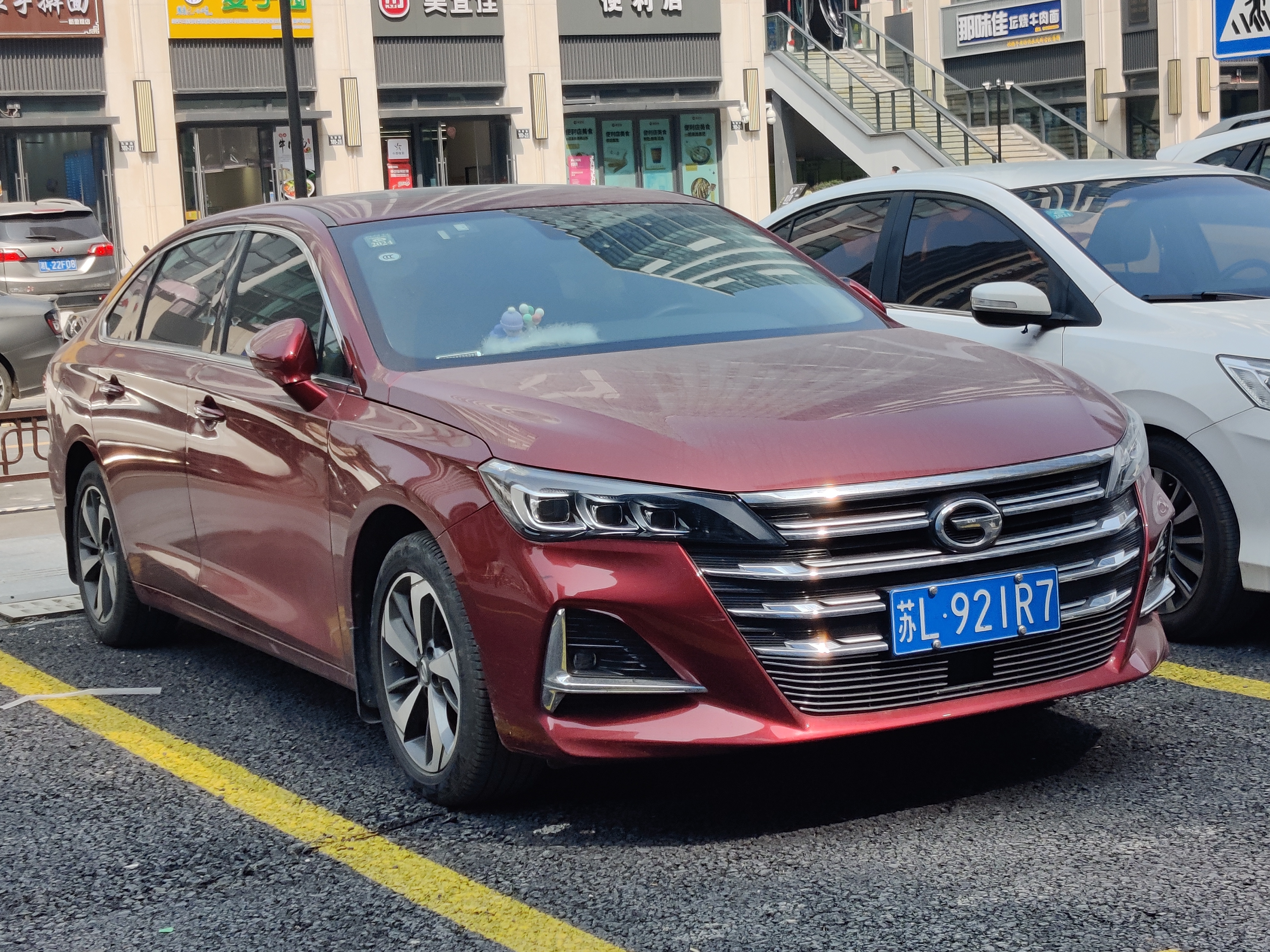
Trumpchi GA6 II

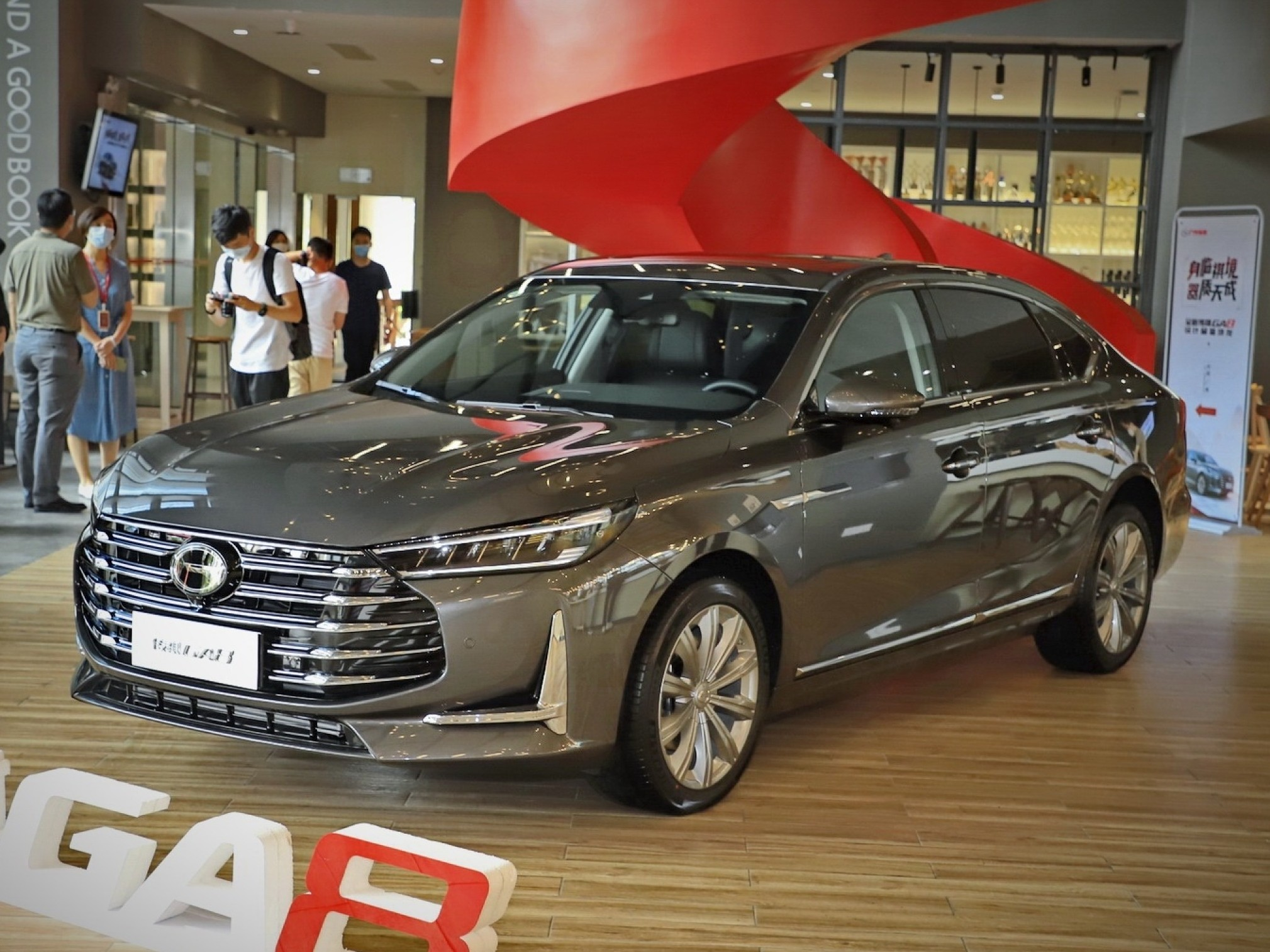
Trumpchi GA8 II

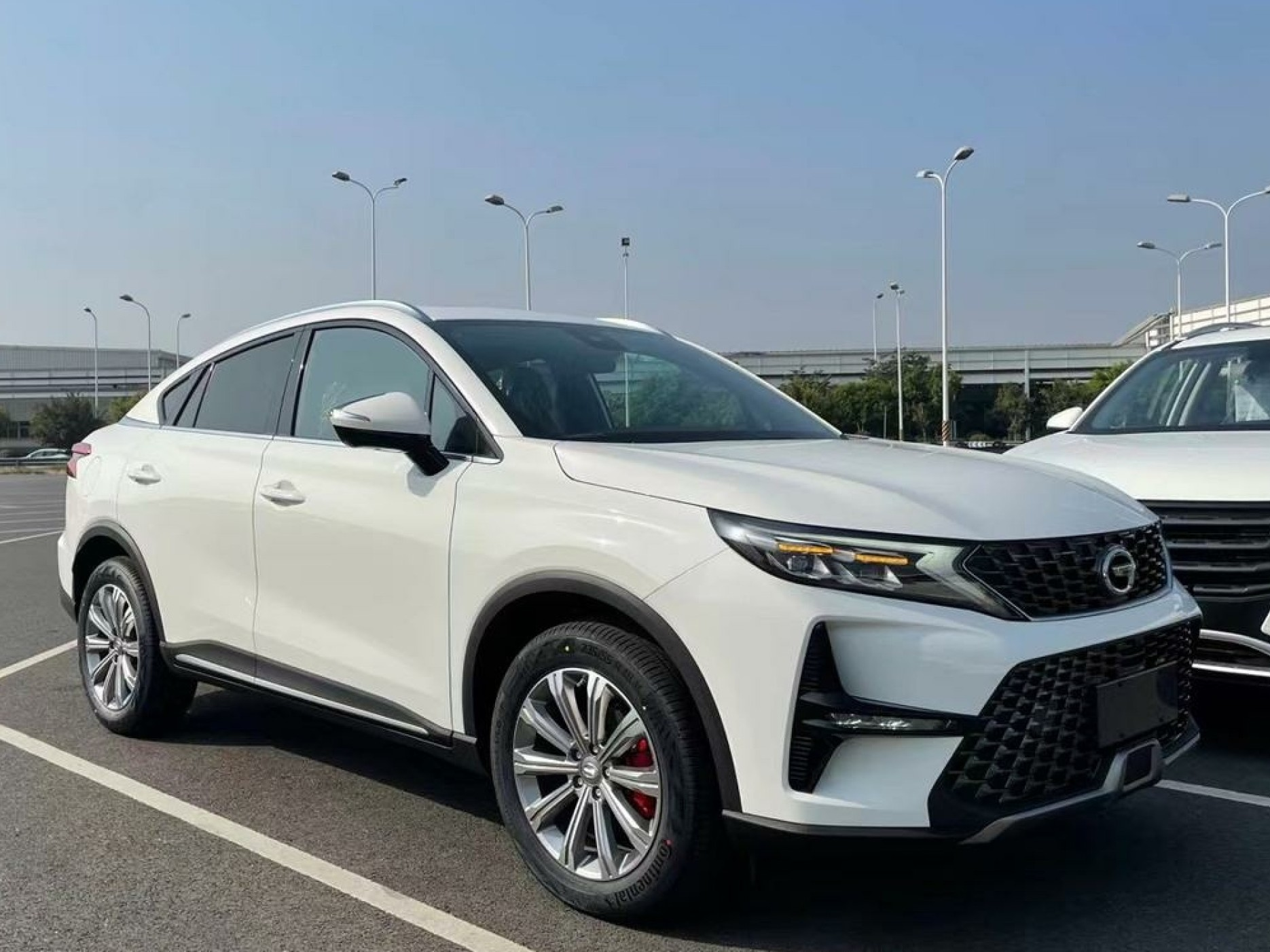
Trumpchi GS4 Coupe

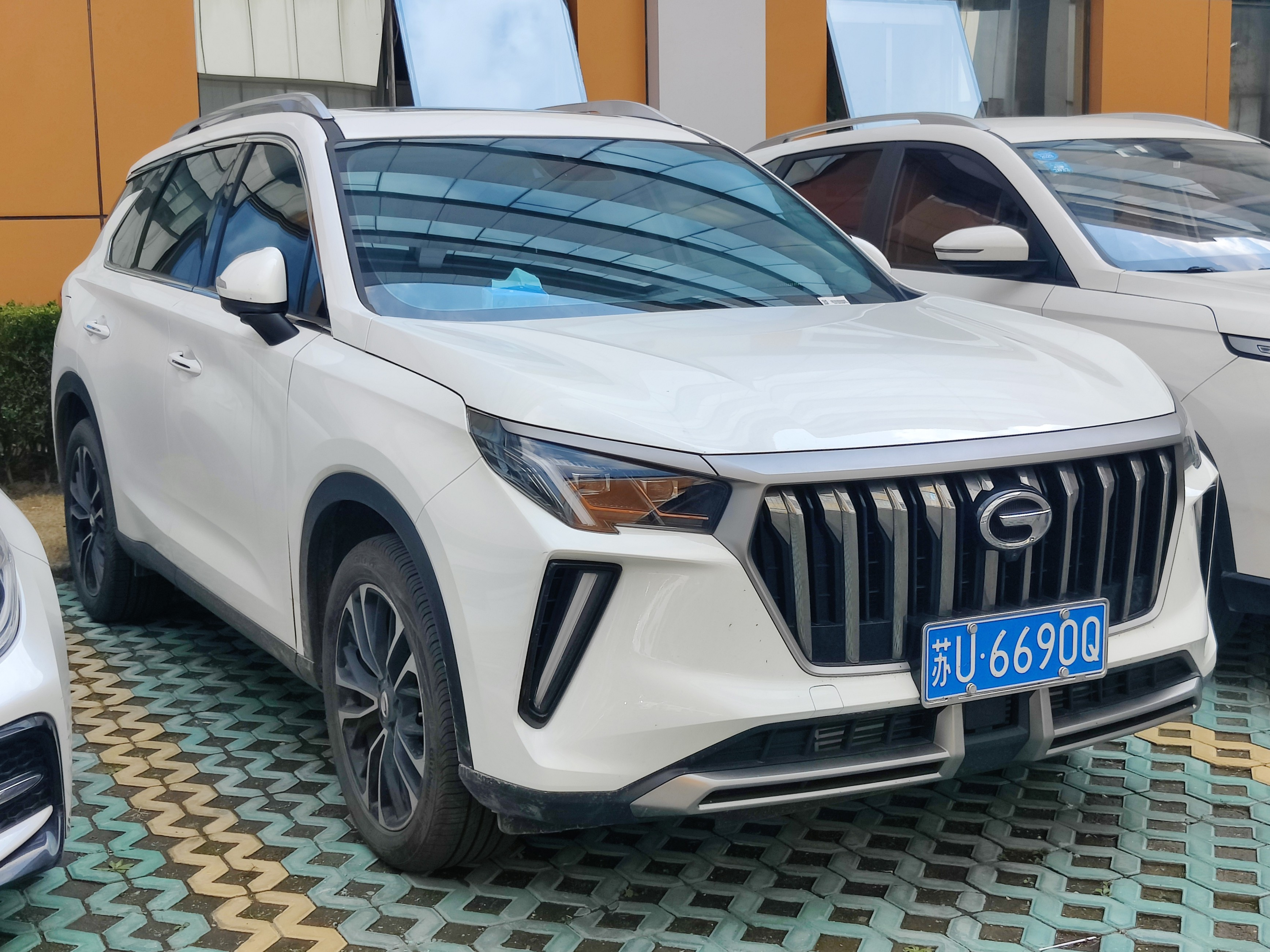
Trumpchi GS4 Plus

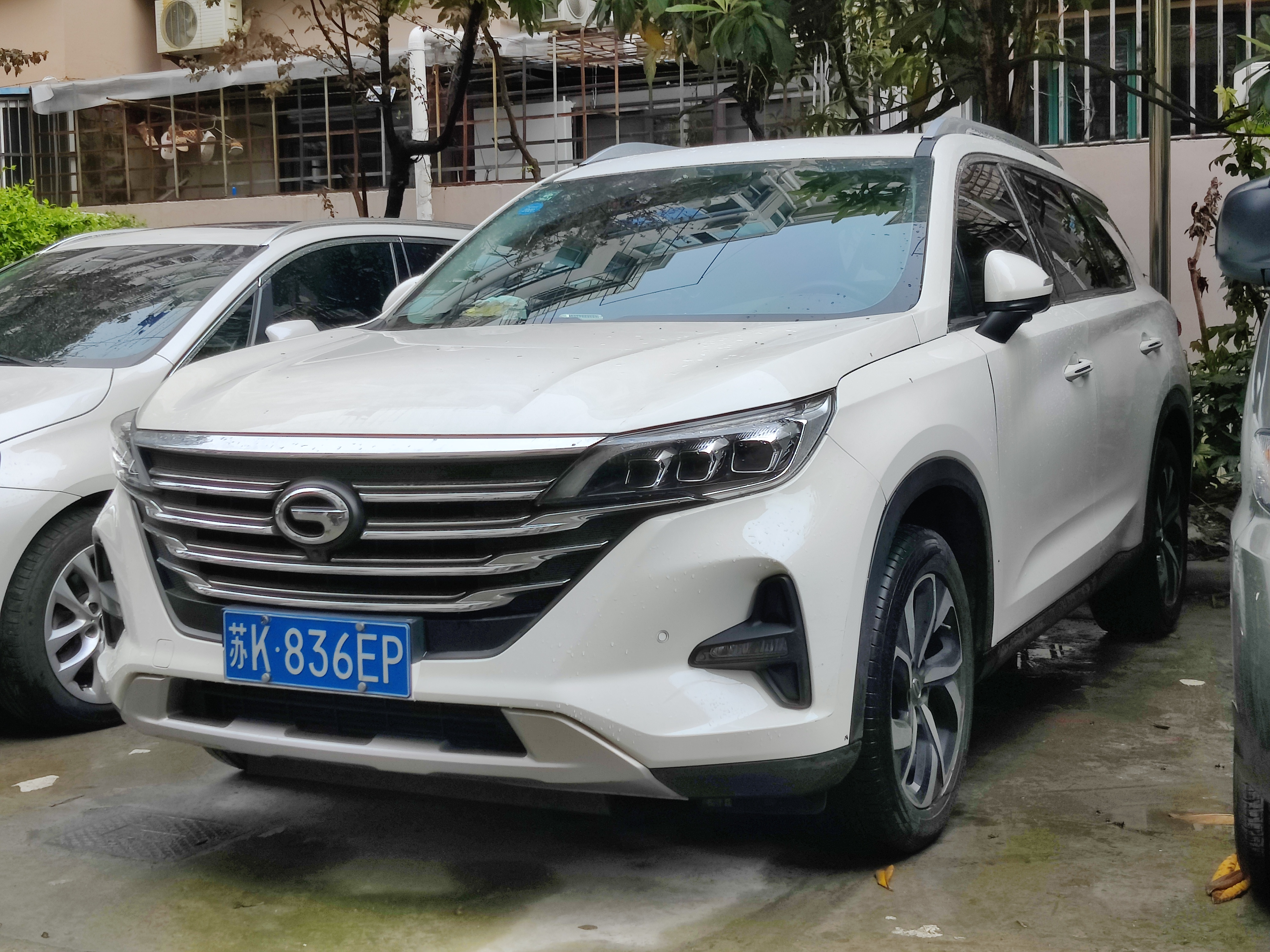
Trumpchi GS5 II

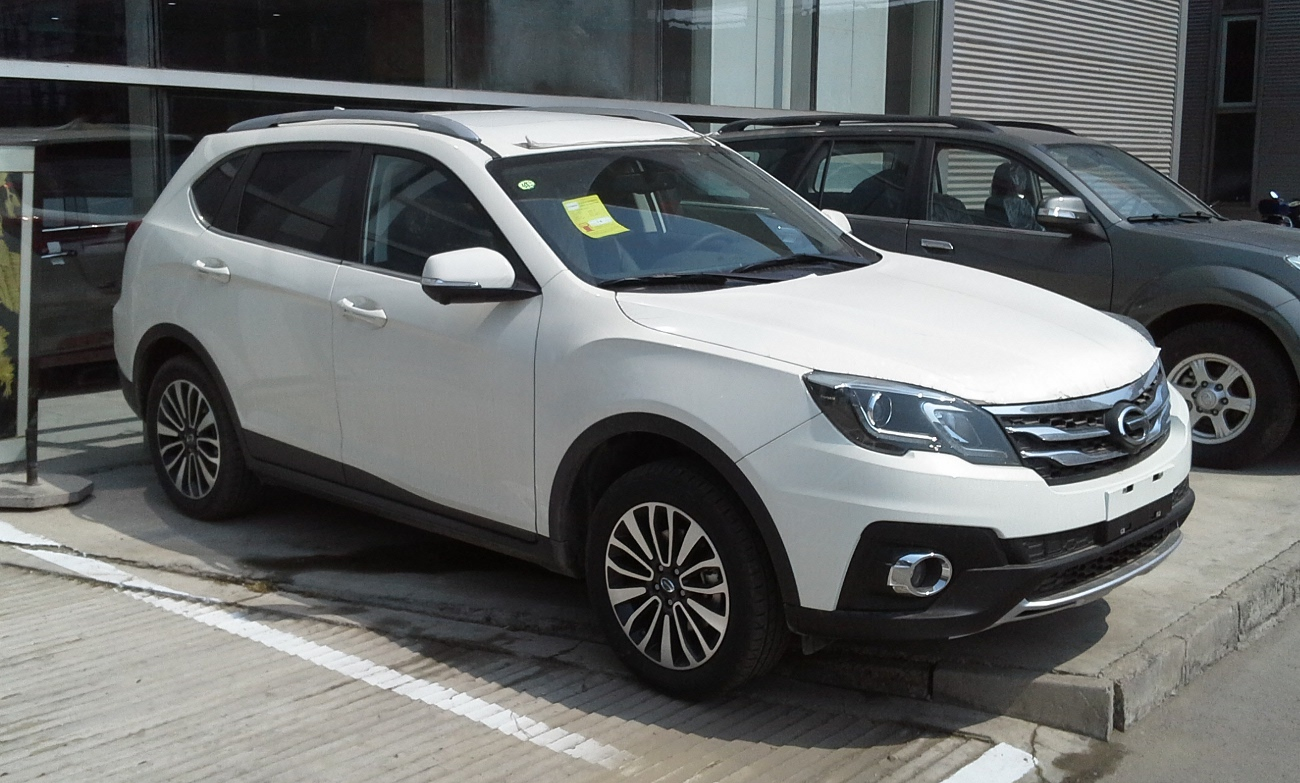
Trumpchi GS5 Super

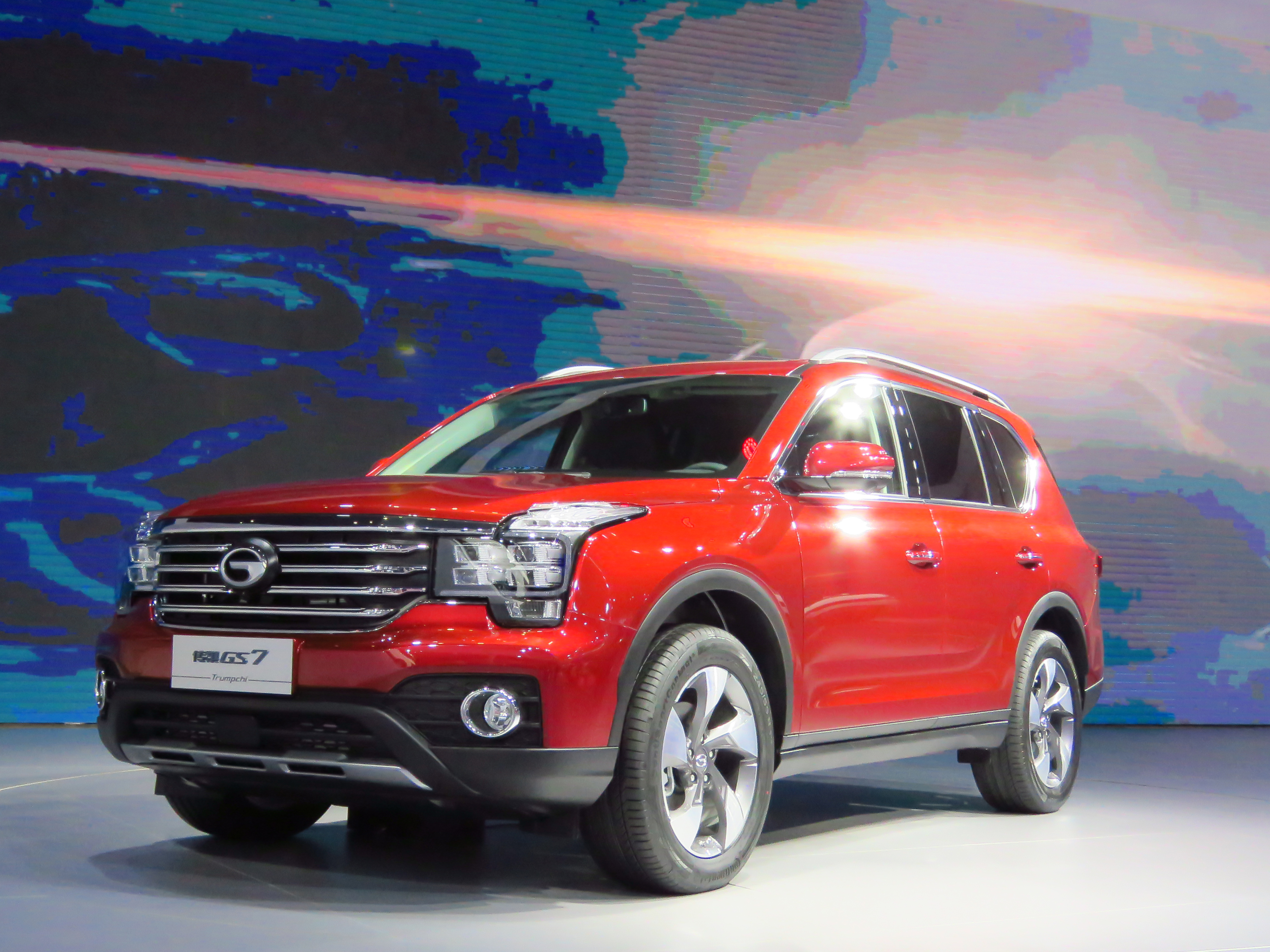
Trumpchi GS7

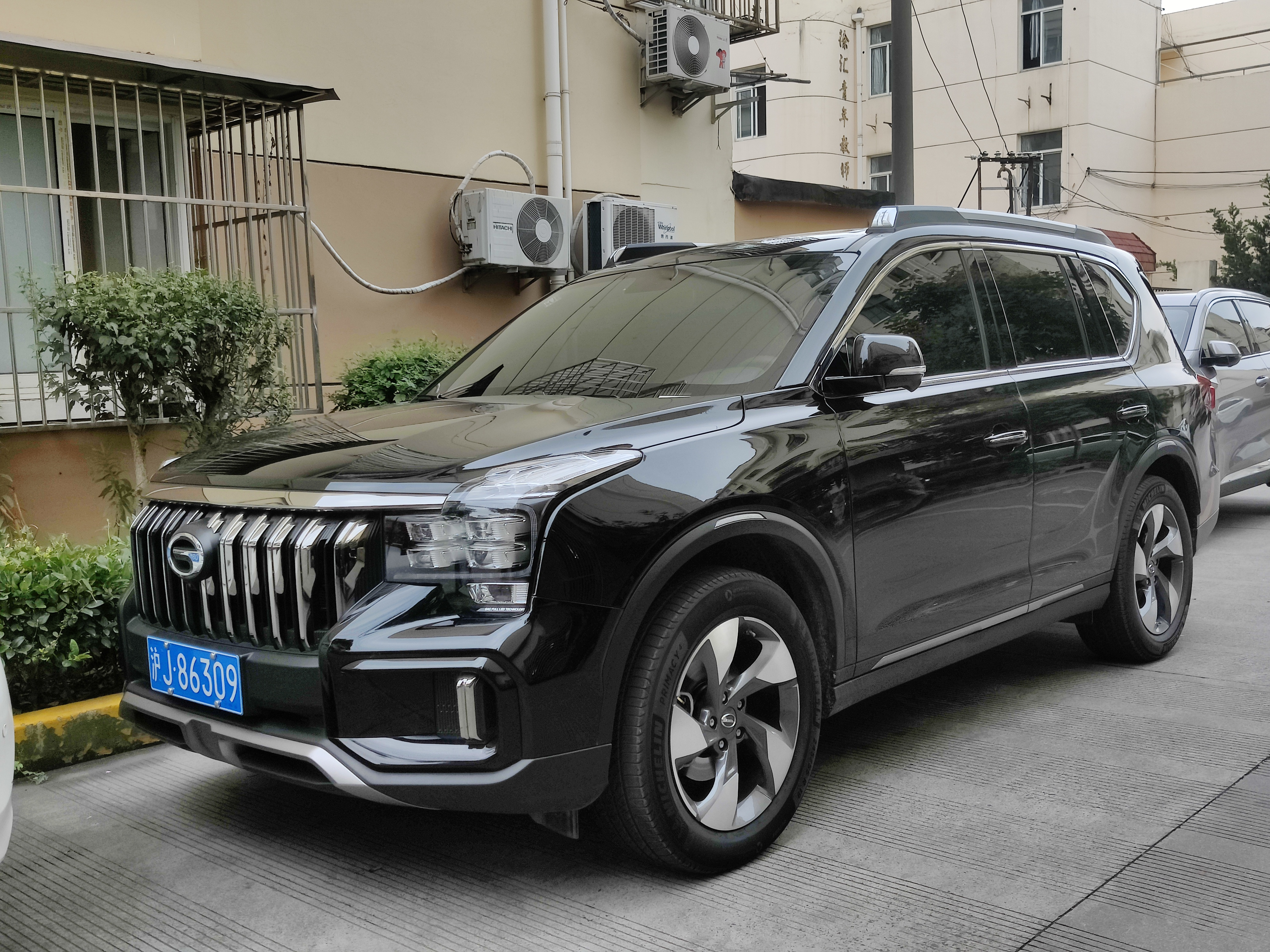
Trumpchi GS8S

=== Concept vehicles ===
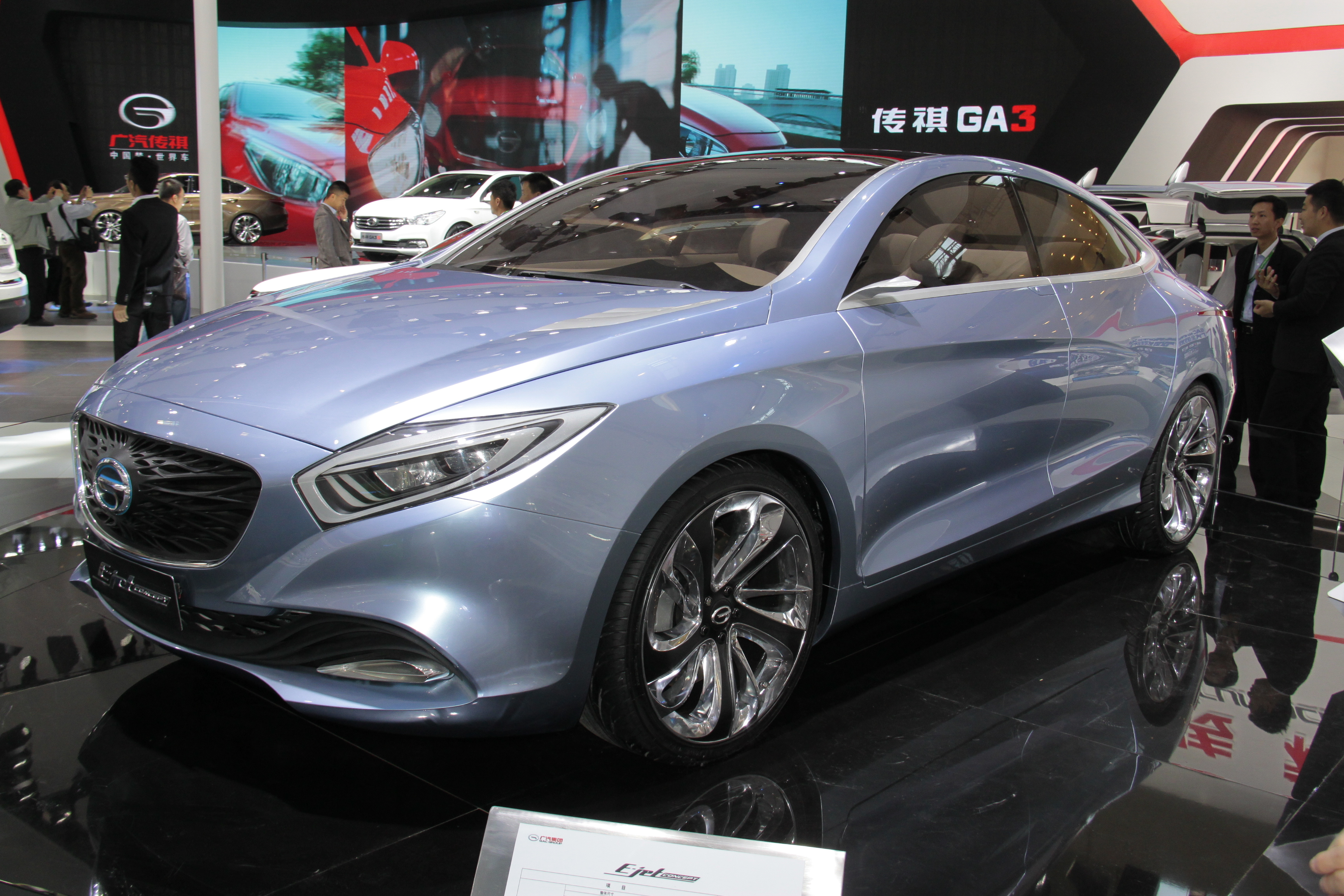
- The Trumpchi NEV E-Jet extended range hybrid electric sedan concept
  2ALL (2018), a city car
- 2U (2018), a city car
- 2US (2018), a city car
- E-Jet (2014), a subcompact sedan
- E-Linker (2011), a subcompact hatchback
- EnLight (2016), a sports car
- Enpulse (2020), a sports car
- Time (2021) a full-size sedan
- EnSpirit (2017), a compact SUV
- Entranze (2019), a compact MPV
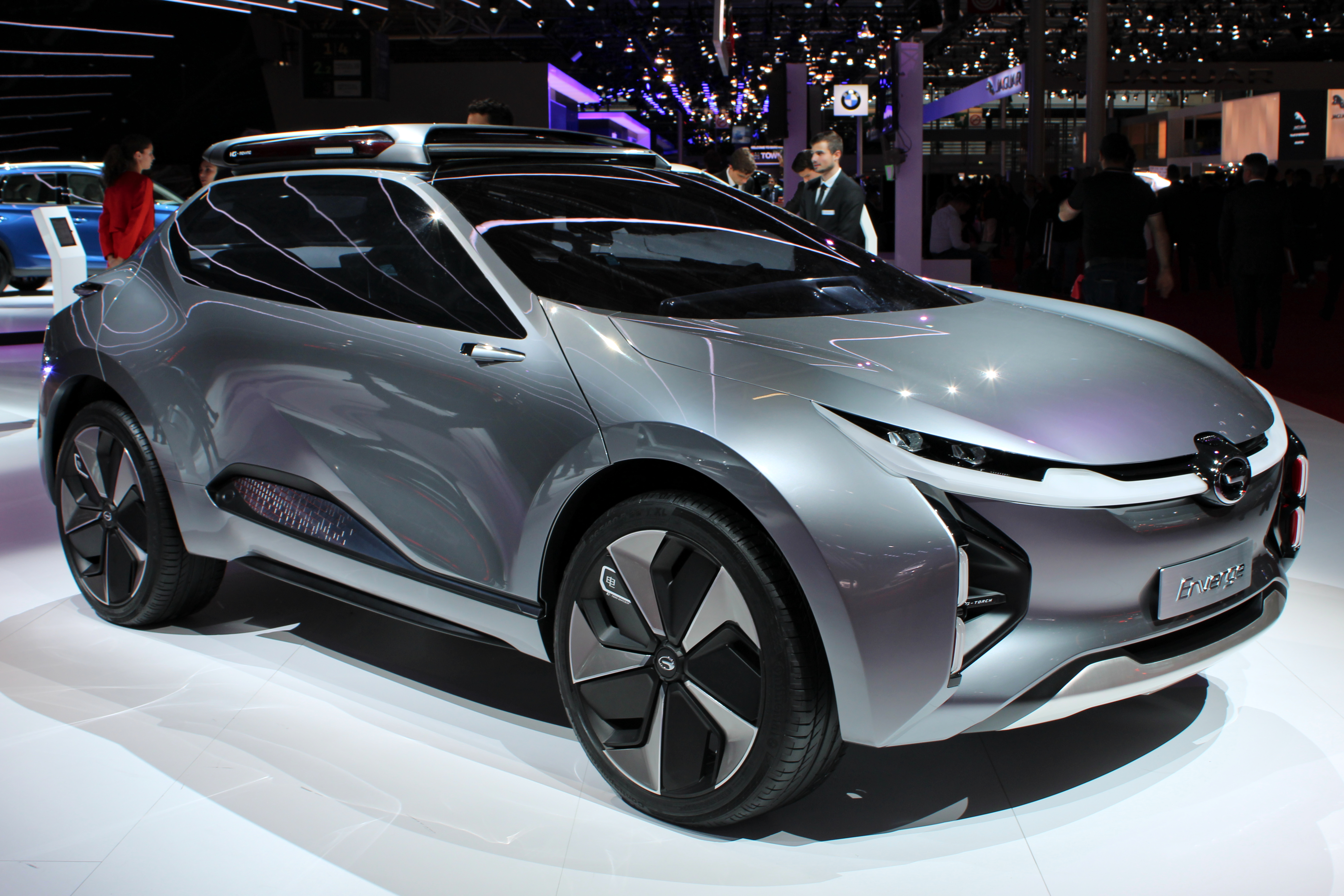
  Concept Enverge
- Enverge (2018), a compact SUV
- GA6 concept (2014), a mid-size sedan
- i-Lounge (2015), a minivan
- iSPACE (2017), a subcompact MPV
- Space Concept (2022), a Minivan
- Moca (2020), a subcompact car
- VIP Lounge (2009), a compact sedan
- WitStar (2015), a compact SUV
- X-Power (2009), a compact SUV

== Sales ==
In 2011, 17,000 Trumpchi vehicles were sold in China, the only market in which they were then available. A total of around 32,000 Trumpchi vehicles were sold in 2012.

In September 2012, GAC announced that exports of Trumpchi cars to markets including Eastern Europe, the Middle East, South America and Southeast Asia would begin in 2013.

On 28 December 2021, GAC launched fully-imported CBU model Trumpchi GS3 Power in Malaysia through WTC Automotive.

== See also ==
- Automobile manufacturers and brands of China
- List of automobile manufacturers of China
