= GAC GS7 =

GAC GS7 can refer to 2 vehicles by GAC Trumpchi:

- GAC GS7, renamed Trumpchi GS7 for export markets
- GAC GS7, renamed Trumpchi Xiangwang S7 for export markets
