= UMO =

UMO can refer to:

- Unknown Mortal Orchestra, a psychedelic rock band from New Zealand
- United Macedonian Organisation: Ilinden–Pirin, a Macedonian organization in Bulgaria
- University of Maine at Orono (unofficial abbreviation)
- Mozilla Add-ons, a website formerly referred to as UMO (from update.mozilla.org)
- UMO Jazz Orchestra, a Finnish big band
- UMO 5, a battery electric compact electric SUV
- UMO 8, a mid-size crossover SUV
- University of Mount Olive, a private Christian University located in Mount Olive, North Carolina, USA
- Umo Eno (born 1964), Nigerian politician and clergy
