= Trumpchi Xiangwang S9 =

Full-size crossover SUV

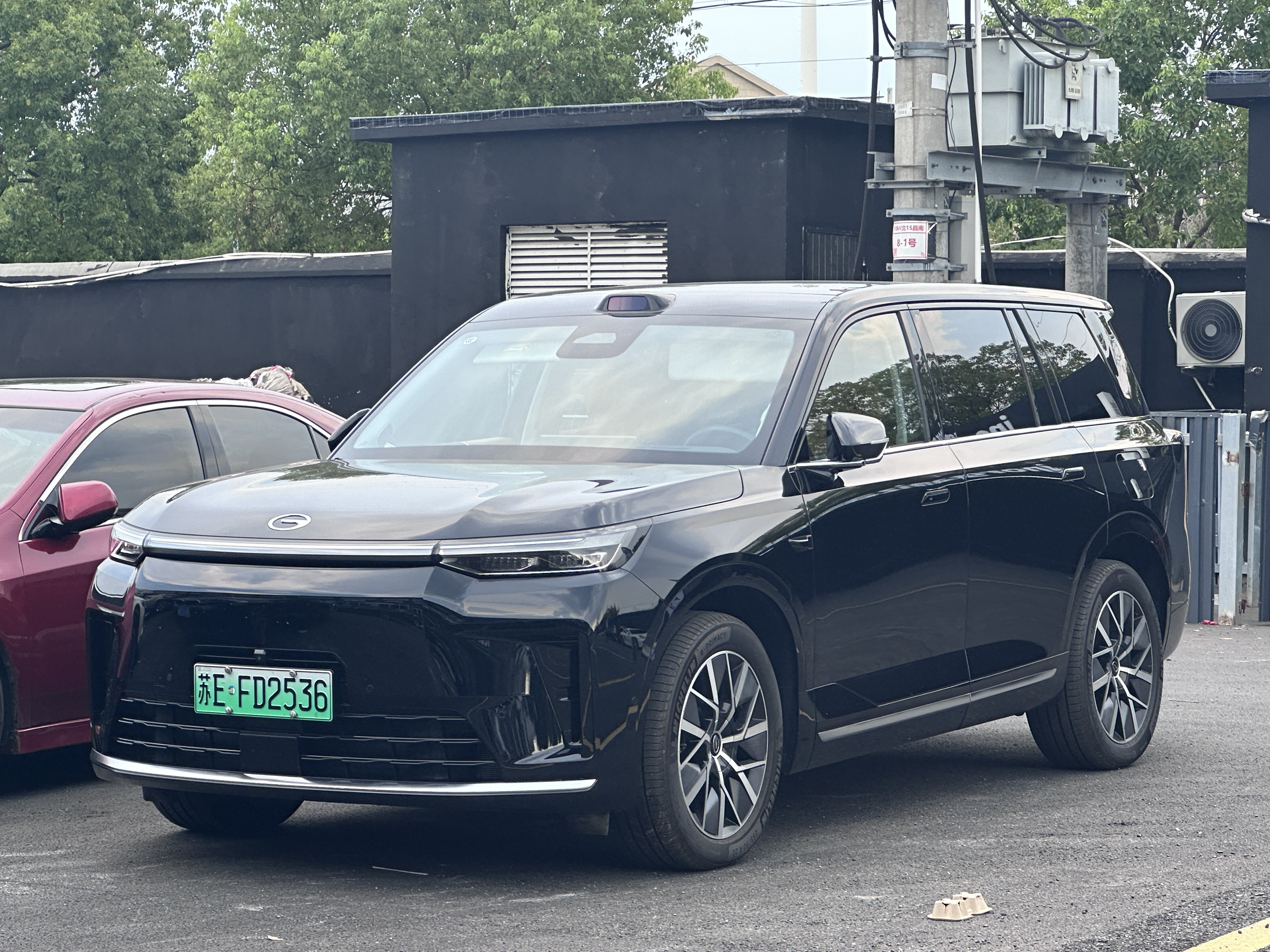
- Trumpchi Xiangwang S9 (Qiankun Max)

Overview
- Manufacturer: GAC Motor
- Also called: GAC S9 (Russia)
- Production: 2025–present
- Assembly: China: Guangzhou

Body and chassis
- Class: Full-size crossover SUV
- Body style: 5-door SUV
- Layout: Front-engine, front-wheel-drive; Front-engine, all-wheel-drive
- Related: Trumpchi Xiangwang S7; Trumpchi GS8/ES9

Dimensions
- Wheelbase: 2,930 mm (115.4 in)
- Length: 5,060 mm (199.2 in)
- Width: 1,950 mm (76.8 in)
- Height: 1,760 mm (69.3 in)
- Curb weight: 2,365 kg (5,214 lb)

The Trumpchi Xiangwang S9 (Chinese: 向往S9) is a full-size crossover SUV produced by GAC Group under the Trumpchi brand in China.

== Overview ==
The Xiangwang S9 was presented in April 2025 at the Shanghai Auto Show. It is was launched in China in September 2025. Being one of the first products of the Xiangwang series, the Xiangwang S9 is a hybrid SUV heavily based on the second generation Trumpchi GS8 equipped with Huawei technology.

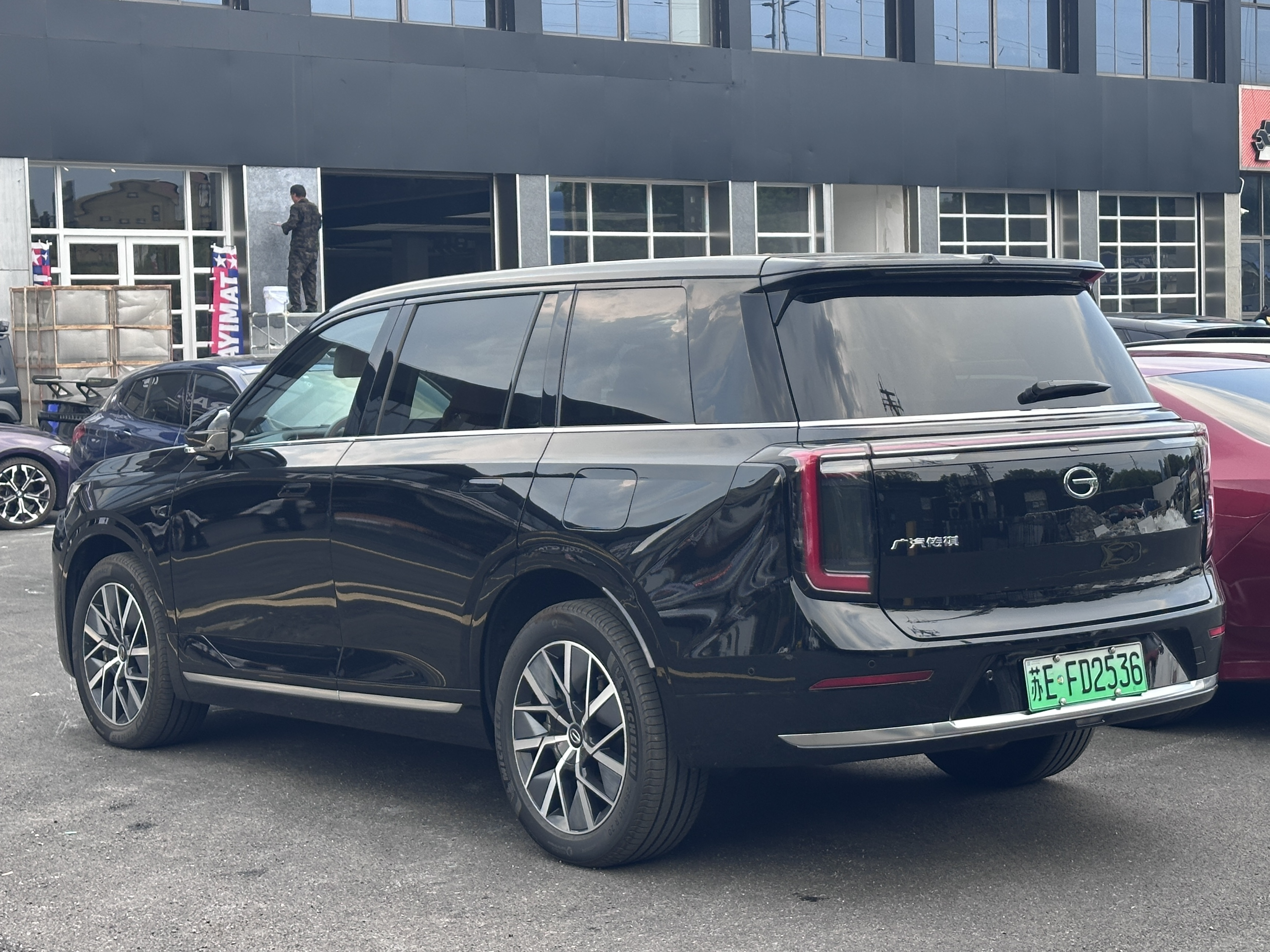
Rear view

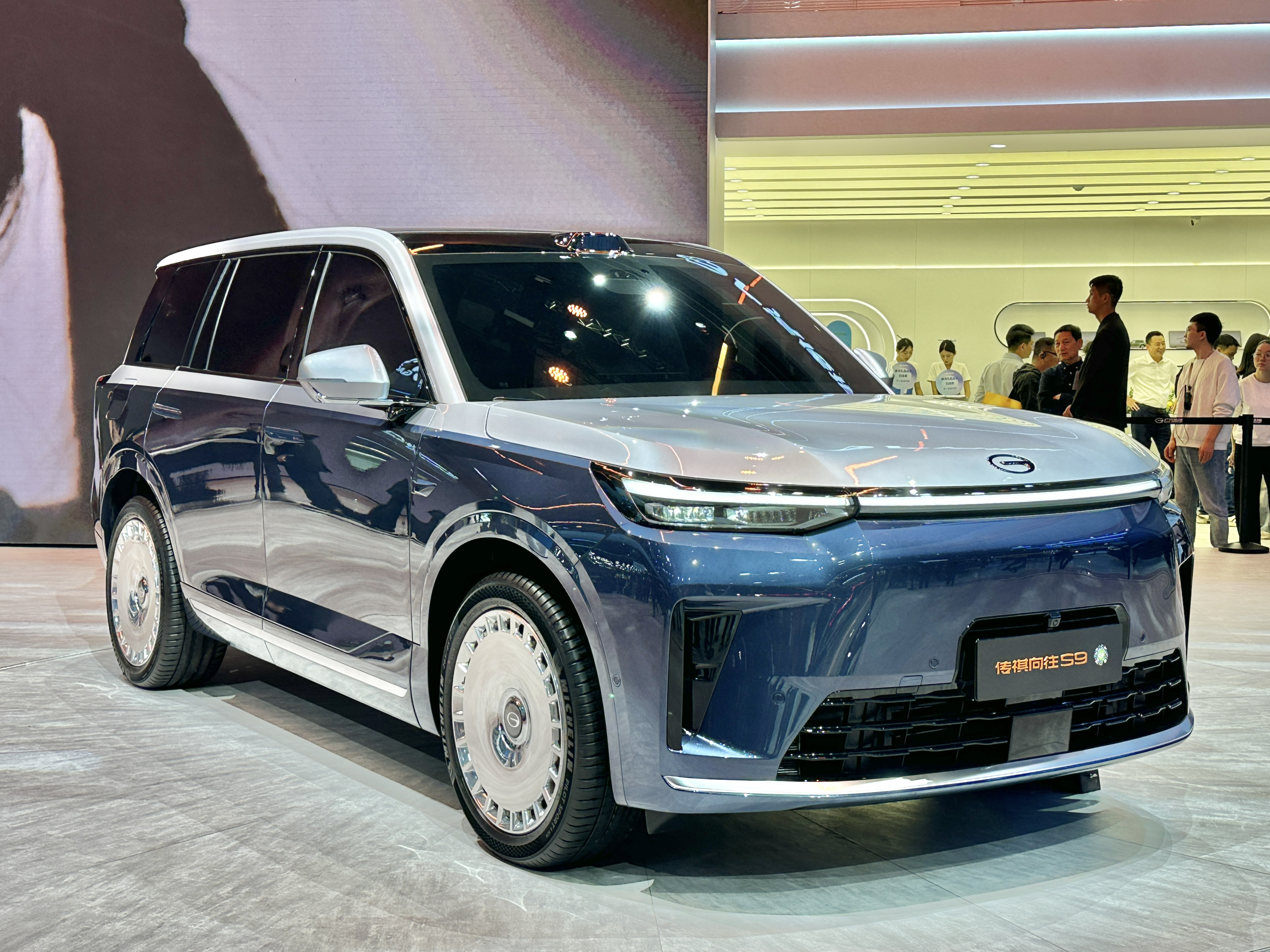
Trumpchi Xiangwang S9 (Qiankun Ultra)

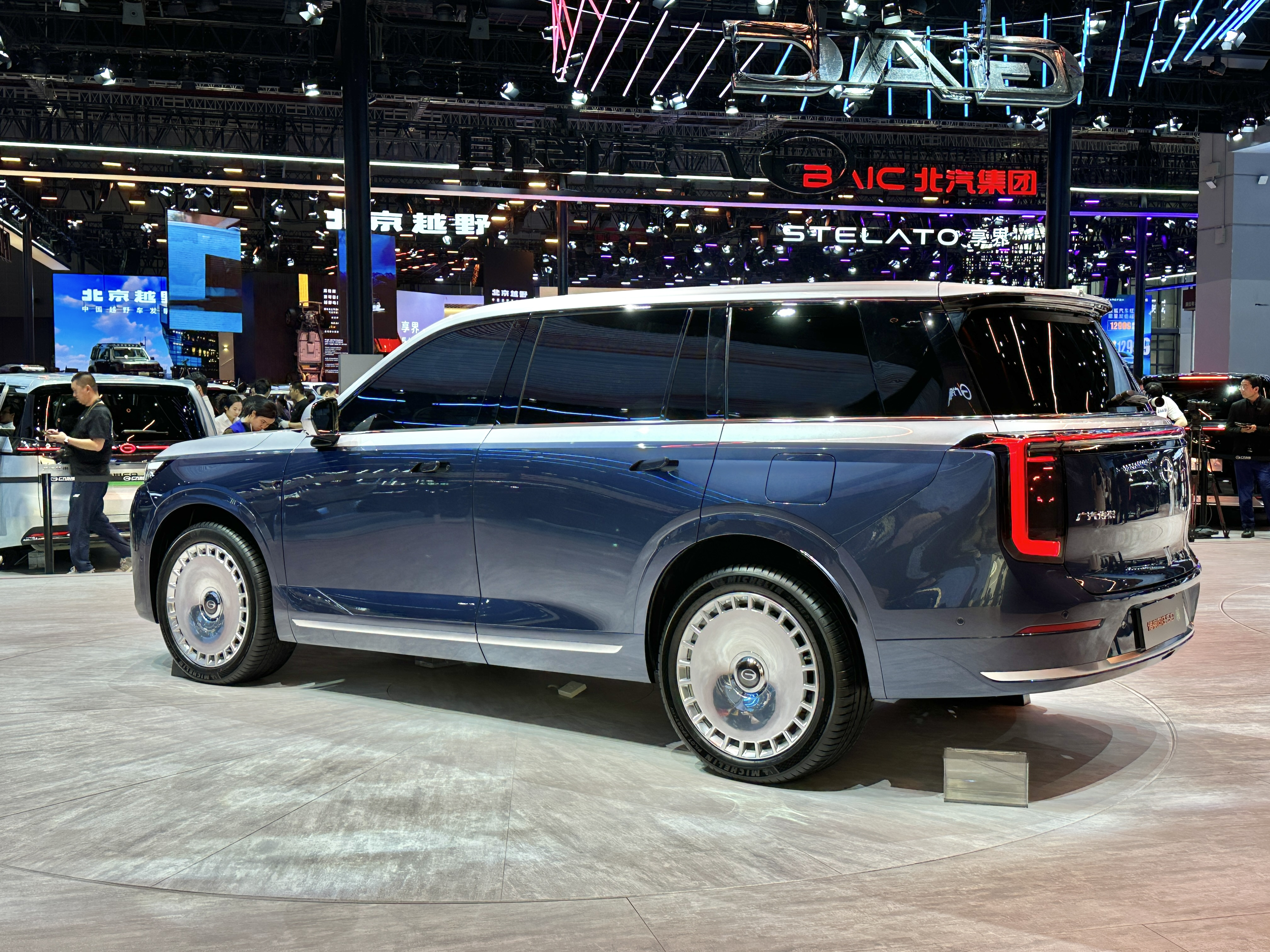
Rear view

== Specifications ==
The Xiangwang S9 is 5.06 meters long, 1.95 meters wide, and 1.76 meters high. It is available as a five-seater with two rows of seats or as a six-seater with three rows of seats. A two-tone paint finish is optionally available. A lidar sensor is installed in the front part of the roof. There are three screens in total in the vehicle. A 12.3-inch instrument panel is installed behind the steering wheel. A 15.6-inch touchscreen for the infotainment system is located in the center console. A 17.3-inch screen can be extended from the roof for rear passengers.

The SUV is powered by a plug-in hybrid system with a turbocharged 1.5-liter gasoline engine combined with two electric motors. A lithium-ion battery with an energy content of 44.5 kWh enables an electric range of 252 km according to the Worldwide Harmonized Light Vehicles Test Procedure (CLTC) cycle. The engine produces 160 horsepower, while the electric motor of the base model produces 231 hp, resulting in an all-wheel-drive combined total output of 392 horsepower. The top of the trim models has a combined total output of 501 horsepower.

== Sales ==
Year	China
2025	2,025
