= Trumpchi GS8 =

Chinese mid-size SUV

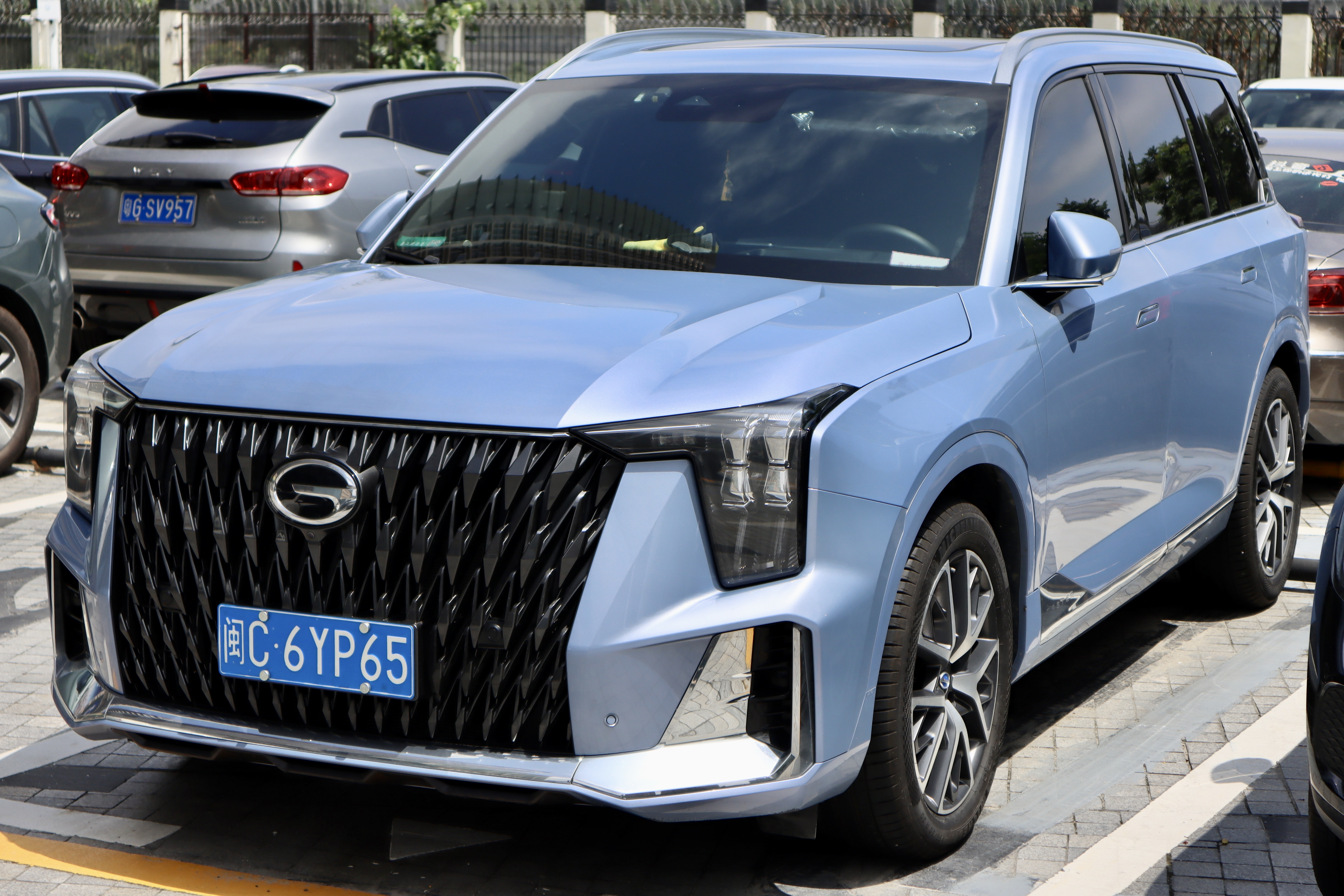
- 2022 Trumpchi GS8

Overview
- Manufacturer: Trumpchi (GAC Group)
- Also called: GAC GS8
- Production: 2016–present
- Model years: 2016–present
- Assembly: China: Guangzhou

Body and chassis
- Class: Mid-size SUV
- Body style: 5-door SUV
- Layout: Front-engine, front-wheel-drive; Front-engine, all-wheel-drive

The Trumpchi GS8 is a mid-size SUV produced by GAC Group under the Trumpchi brand in China and the GAC Motor brand globally.

The first generation was launched in 2016, and spawned a slightly smaller 5-seater variant dubbed the Trumpchi GS7. The Trumpchi GS7 received a facelift in April 2020 and was renamed the Trumpchi GS8S. The second generation GS8 was unveiled in 2021 with a longer, wider body and a longer wheelbase compared to the first generation model.

== First generation (2016) ==
Trumpchi GS8
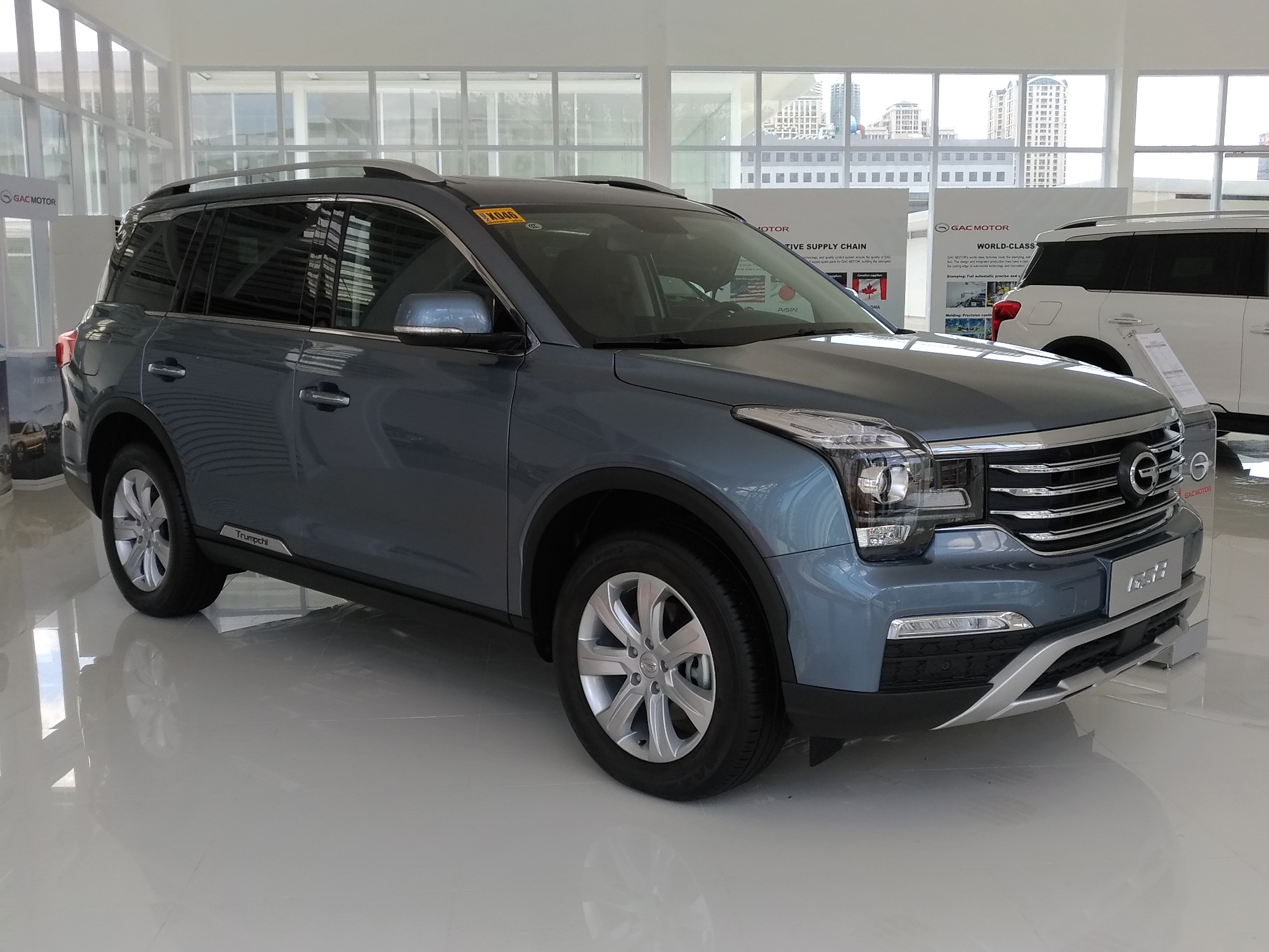
- GAC GS8 GE (Philippines)

Overview
- Production: 2016–2022
- Model years: 2016–2021
- Designer: Fan Zhang

Body and chassis
- Related: Trumpchi GS7

Powertrain
- Engine: Gasoline: 2.0 L 4B20M1 turbo I4
- Transmission: 6-speed Aisin AWTF-80 SC automatic

Dimensions
- Wheelbase: 2,800 mm (110.2 in)
- Length: 4,810–4,835 mm (189.4–190.4 in)
- Width: 1,910 mm (75.2 in)
- Height: 1,770 mm (69.7 in)
- Curb weight: 1,840–1,990 kg (4,057–4,387 lb)

Designed by former Mercedes-Benz designer Fan Zhang, it debuted at the 2016 Beijing Auto Show as Trumpchi's largest vehicle in its product lineup and later at the Detroit Auto Show.

The Trumpchi GS8 is powered by a 2.0-litre turbocharged four-cylinder engine producing 148 kW (201 PS; 198 hp) at 5,200 rpm and 320 N⋅m (236 lb⋅ft; 33 kg⋅m) of torque between 1,750 and 4,000 rpm, the engine is paired with a six-speed automatic gearbox sending the power to either the front wheels or all four wheels. The full designation of the GS8 is Trumpchi GS8 320T. Pricing starts at 163,800 yuan and ends at 259,800 yuan ($24,200 – 38,000).

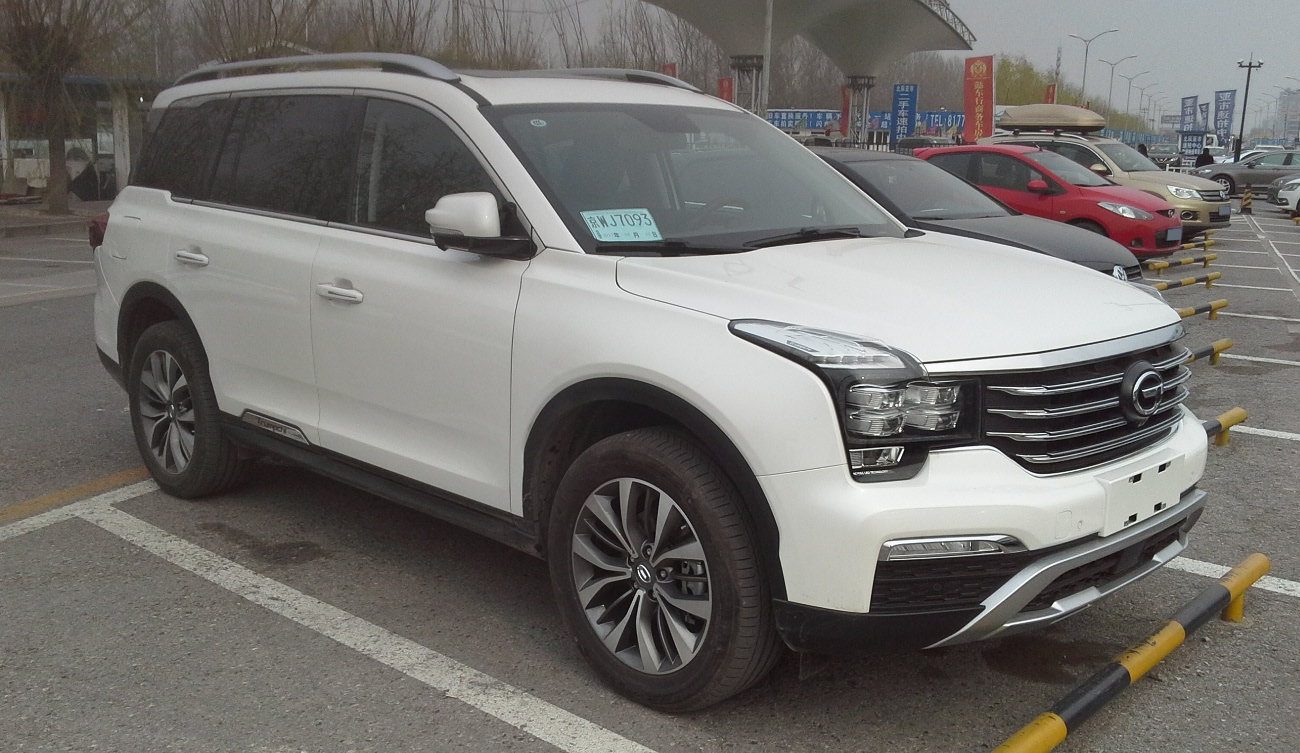
Trumpchi GS8 front

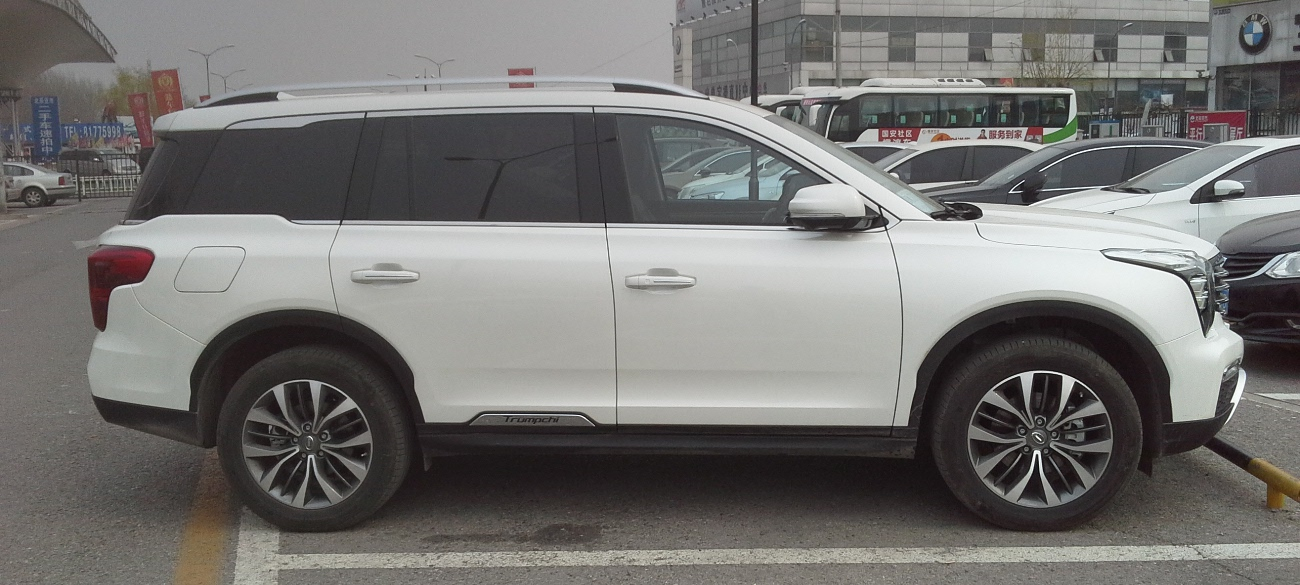
Trumpchi GS8 side profile

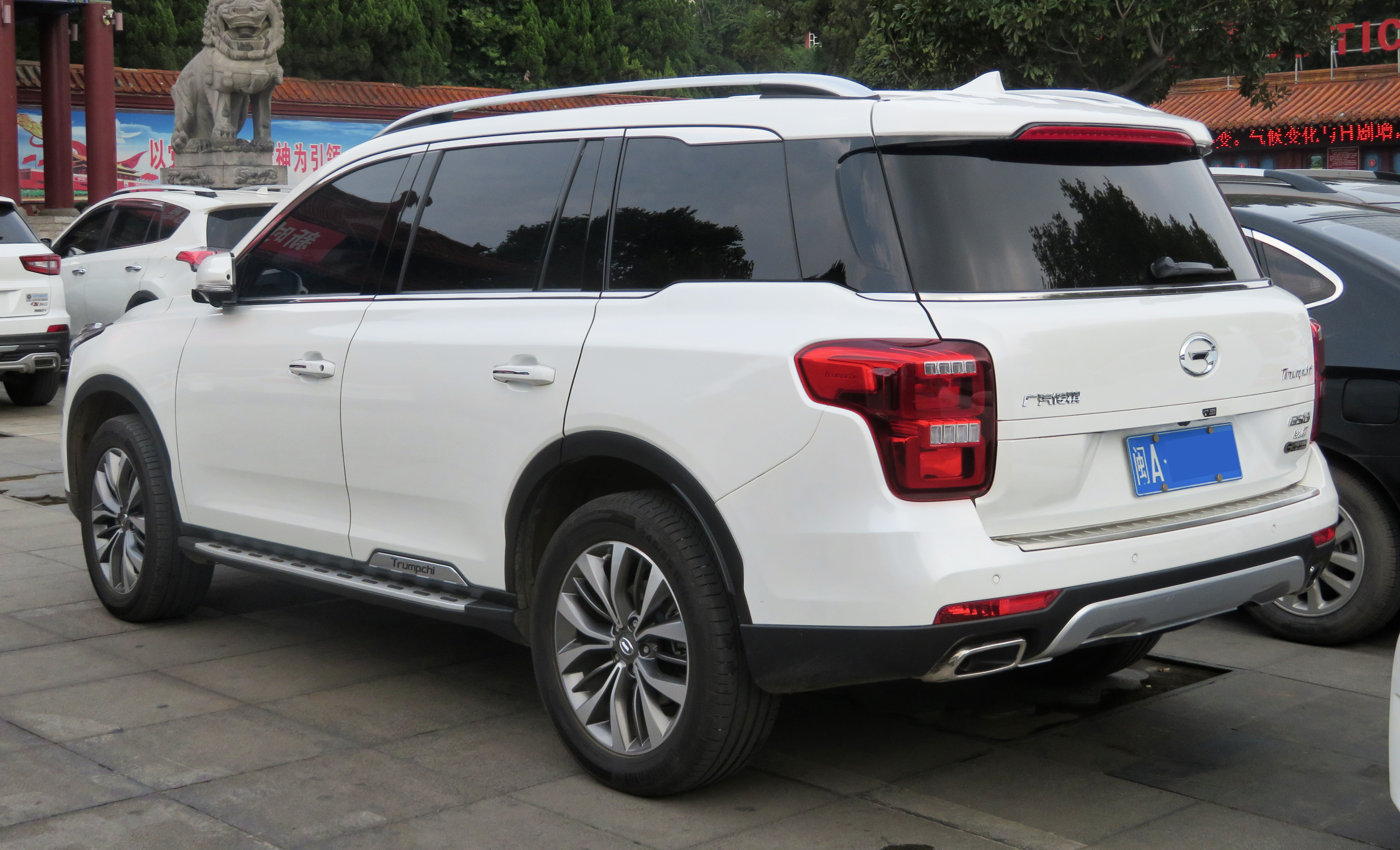
GAC GS8 GE rear

=== Overseas markets ===
GAC Group launched their GAC Motor brand and the GS8 SUV, in Russia, on December 9, 2019.

In Lebanon, the GS8 is sold by Bazerji Motors Sal and comes with 2.0 engine and 4WD and back up camera and parking sensor.

GAC Group was initially slated to launch the GS8 in the United States by late 2019, however announcement were delayed to their sales plans to the first half of 2020, during the 2019 Detroit Auto Show. On May 22, 2019, due to the worsening China-US trade tensions, the parent company of Trumpchi brand: Guangzhou Automobile Group Co., decided to indefinitely postpone their US market plans.

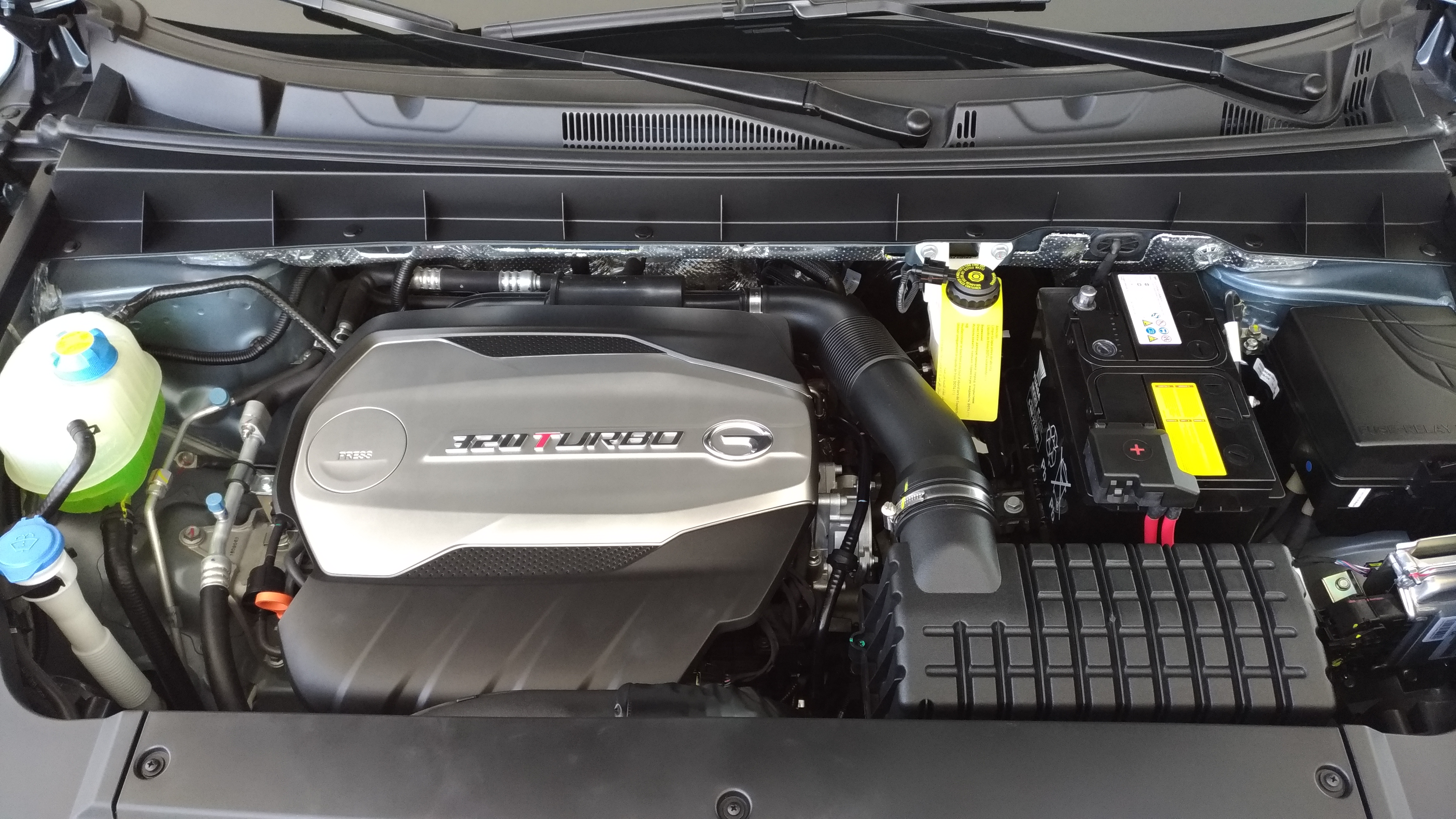
GAC GS8 GE engine bay (Philippines)

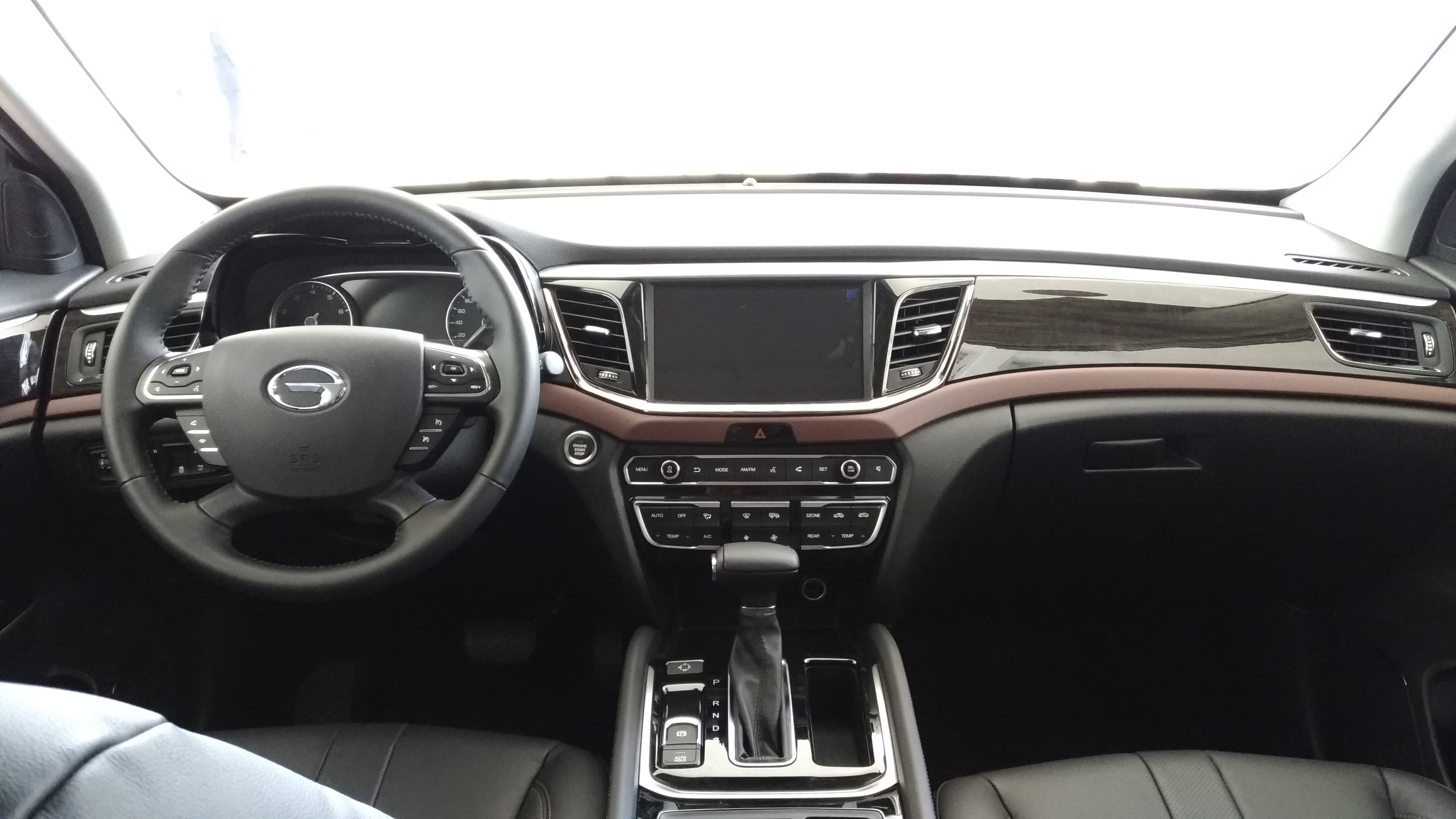
GAC GS8 GE interior (Philippines)

=== Trumpchi GS8S ===
The Trumpchi GS8S was launched in April 2020. Essentially a facelifted GS7, the GS8S sits slightly below the regular GS8 as a 5-Seater Trumpchi GS8.

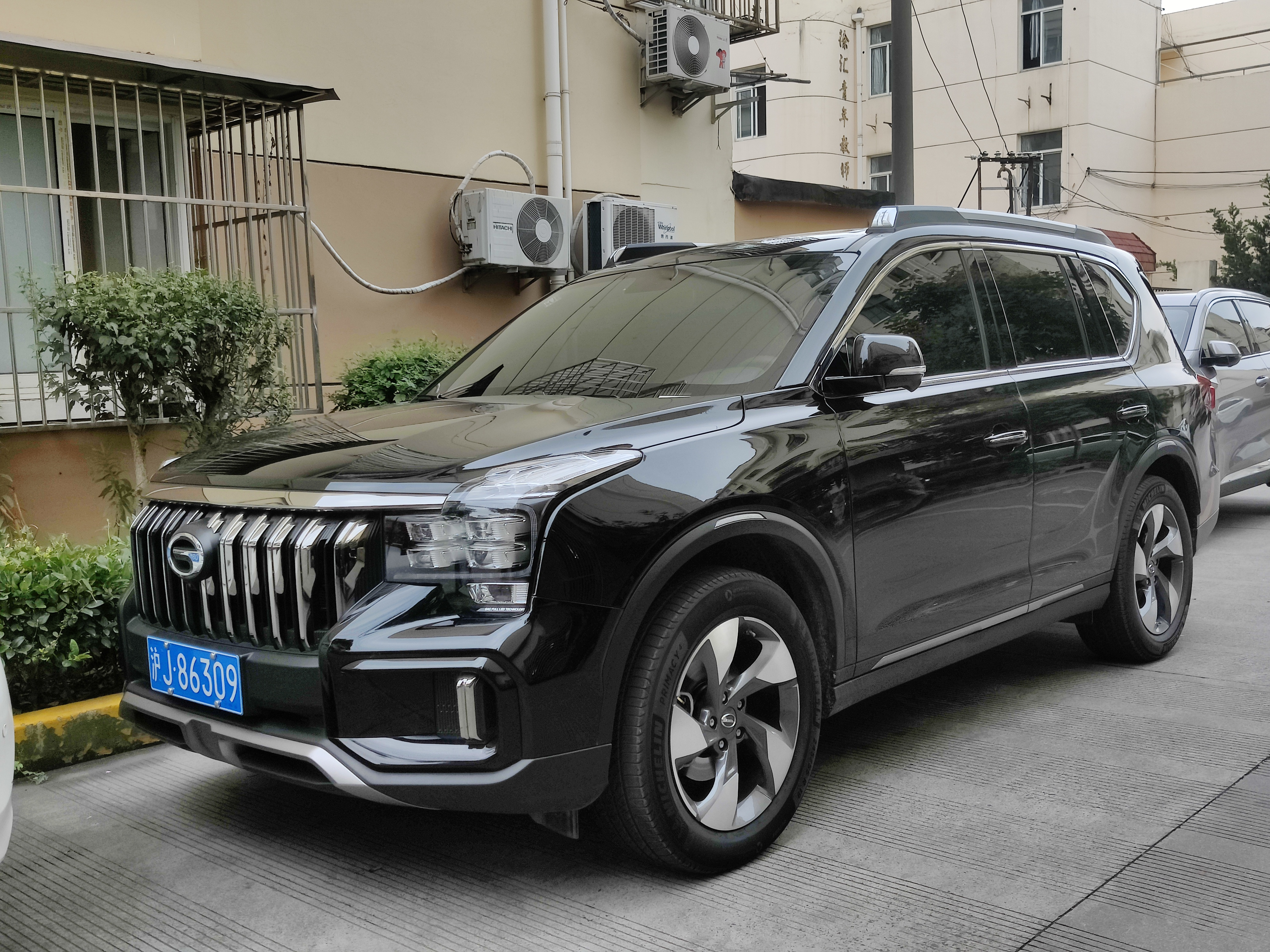
Trumpchi GS8S front.

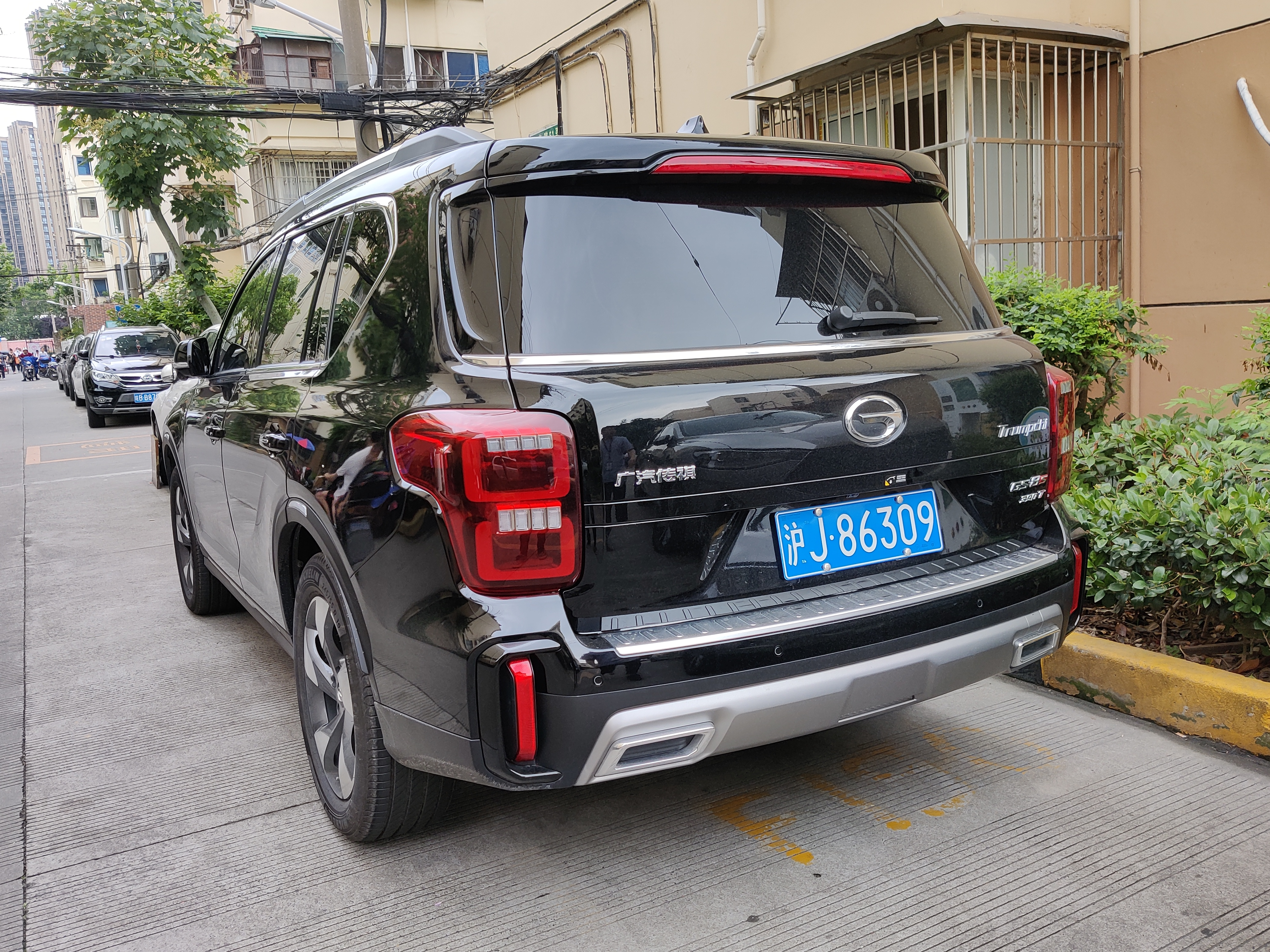
Trumpchi GS8S rear.

=== Powertrain ===
Specs
Model	Years	Transmission	Power@rpm	Torque@rpm	0–100 km/h (62 mph)	Top speed
GS8	2016–2021	6-speed automatic	148 kW (201 PS; 198 hp) at 5,200 rpm	320 N⋅m (236 lb⋅ft; 33 kg⋅m) at 1,750–4,000 rpm	11.5s (FWD); 12.0s (AWD)	185 km/h (115 mph)

== Second generation (2021) ==
Trumpchi GS8 II
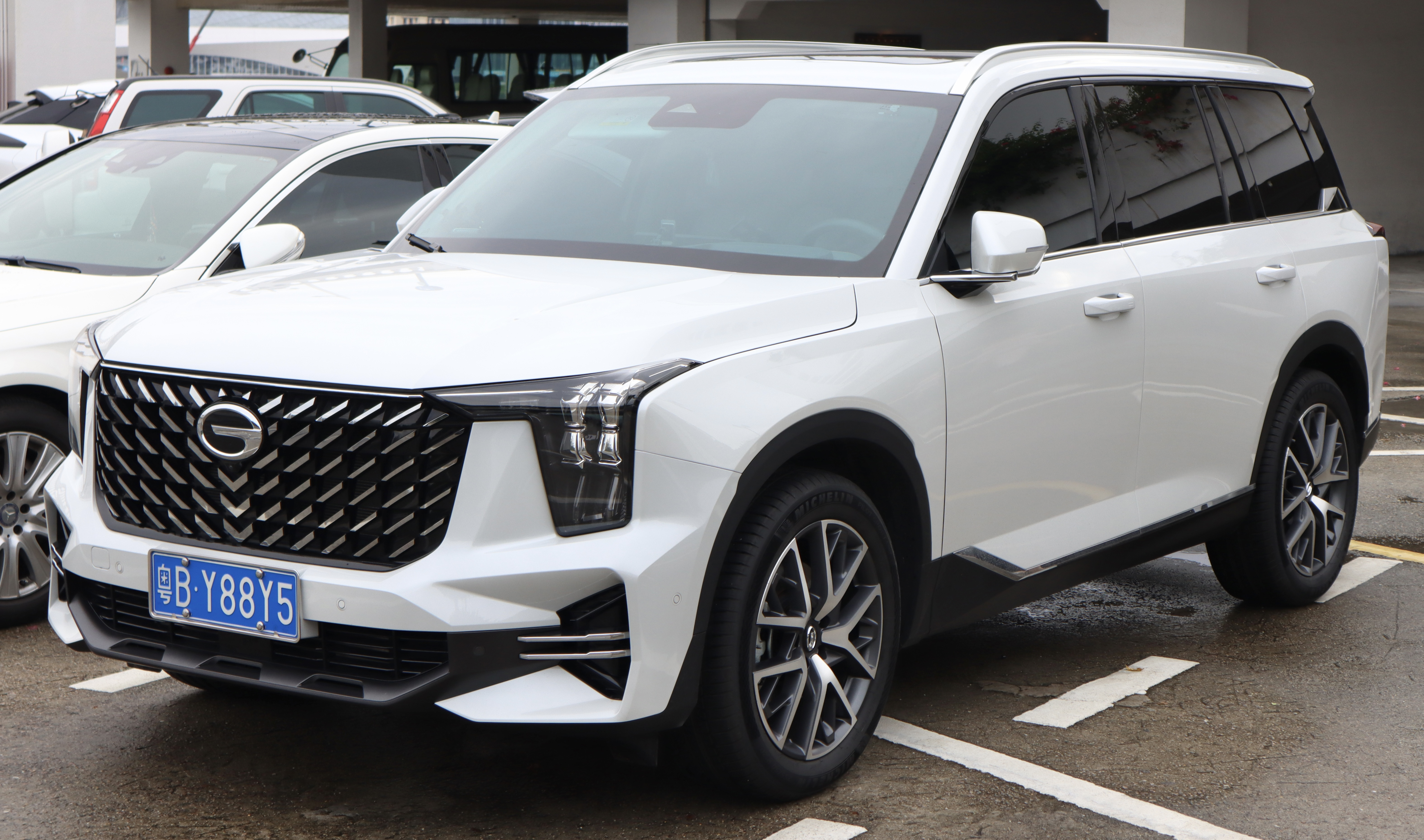

Overview
- Also called: Trumpchi ES9 (Plug-in hybrid); Itala 61 (Italy)
- Production: 2021–present
- Model years: 2021–present
- Designer: Darcy Gu

Body and chassis
- Platform: GPMA-L; i-GPMA (for ES9)
- Related: Trumpchi Xiangwang S9

Powertrain
- Engine: Gasoline: 2.0 L 4B20J1 turbo I4; Gasoline hybrid: 2.0 L 4B20J2 turbo I4
- Electric motor: 650V Permanent Magnet Synchronous Motor: 40 kW (54 PS; 54 hp) (GS8 Hybrid); 134 kW (182 PS; 180 hp) (ES9 PHEV)
- Power output: 185 kW (252 PS; 248 hp) (GS8 2.0T); 174 kW (237 PS; 233 hp) (GS8 Hybrid); 274 kW (373 PS; 367 hp) (ES9 PHEV)
- Transmission: 8-speed Aisin AWF8F35 automatic; Toyota e-CVT; 2-speed DHT
- Hybrid drivetrain: Power-split Hybrid (GS8 Hybrid); PHEV (ES9 PHEV)
- Battery: 1.6 kWh (6.5 Ah / 244.8V) NiMH (GS8 Hybrid); 25.57 kWh NMC (ES9 PHEV)
- Electric range: 110 km (68 mi) (WLTC, ES9); 143 km (89 mi) (CLTC, ES9)

Dimensions
- Wheelbase: 2,920 mm (115.0 in)
- Length: 4,980 mm (196.1 in) (GS8); 5,015–5,110 mm (197.4–201.2 in) (GS8 Hybrid/ES9)
- Width: 1,950 mm (76.8 in)
- Height: 1,780 mm (70.1 in)
- Curb weight: 1,850–2,030 kg (4,079–4,475 lb) (GS8); 2,120 kg (4,674 lb) (GS8 Hybrid); 2,220 kg (4,894 lb) (ES9)

The second generation GS8 was unveiled in July 2021. The powertrain of the second generation GS8 is a 2.0 liter turbo engine mated to a 8-speed automatic transmission, with a maximum output of 185 kW (248 hp; 252 PS) and a maximum torque of 400 N⋅m (295 lb⋅ft; 41 kg⋅m). A hybrid version powered by a 2.0 litre engine is also available with Toyota-sourced THS.

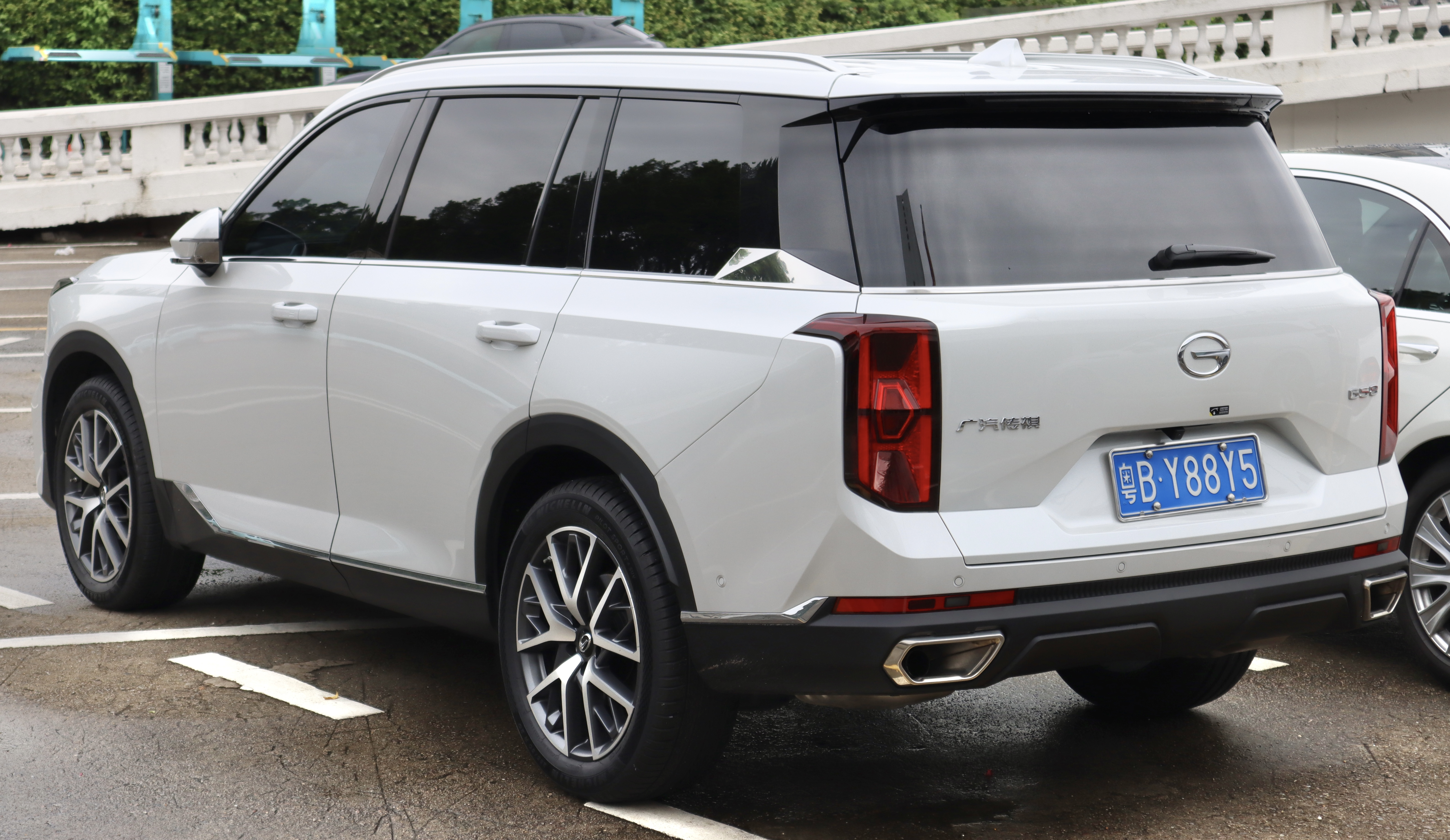
Trumpchi GS8 II rear

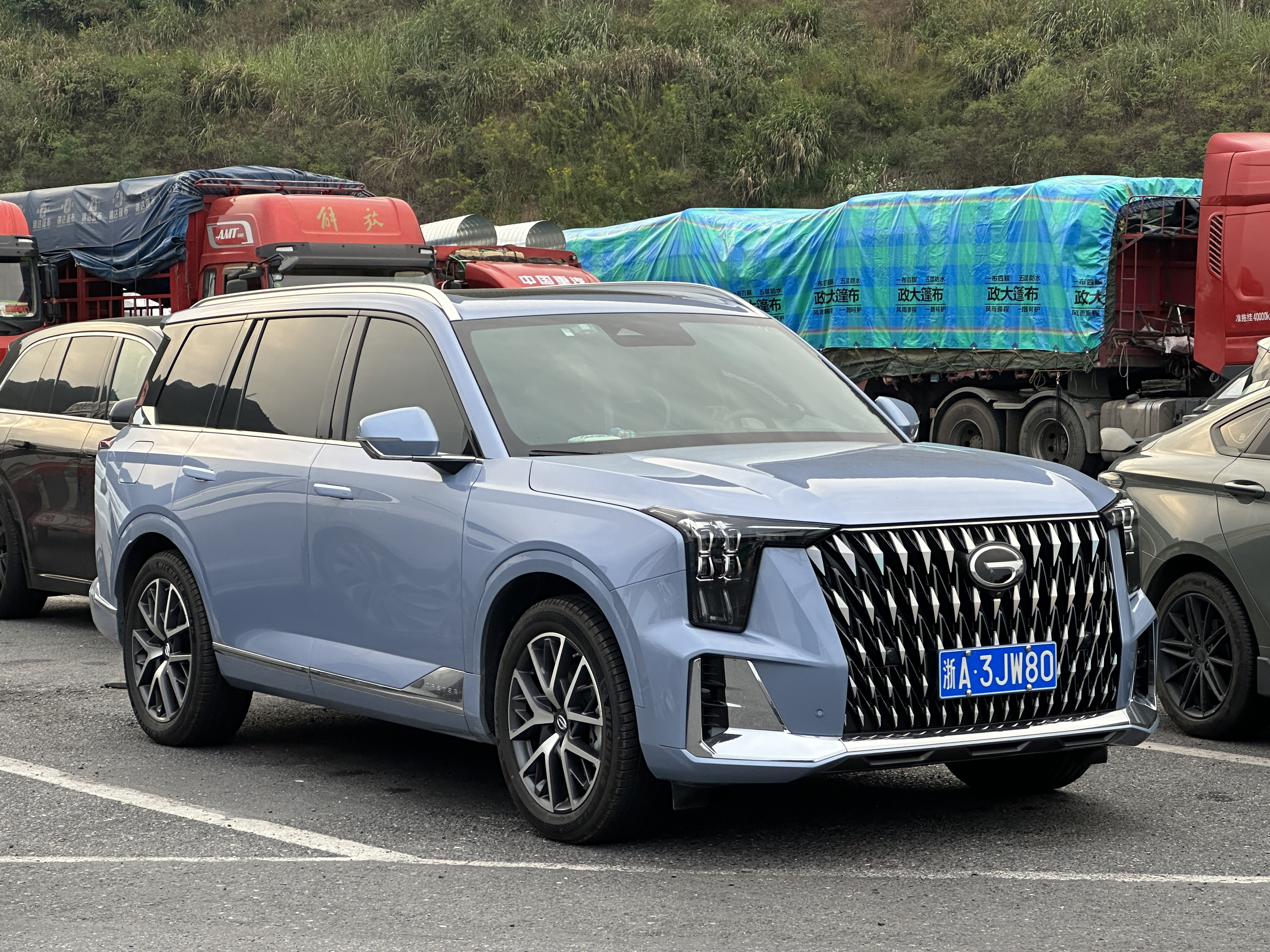
Trumpchi GS8 II with an alternative front end design

=== Trumpchi ES9 ===
The Trumpchi ES9 is the PHEV variant of the second generation Trumpchi GS8. The ES9 features a 2.0-liter turbocharged engine paired with a single electric motor with a 2-speed DHT transmission, reaching a combined power of 274 kW (373 PS; 367 hp) with 630 N⋅m (465 lbf⋅ft) of torque.

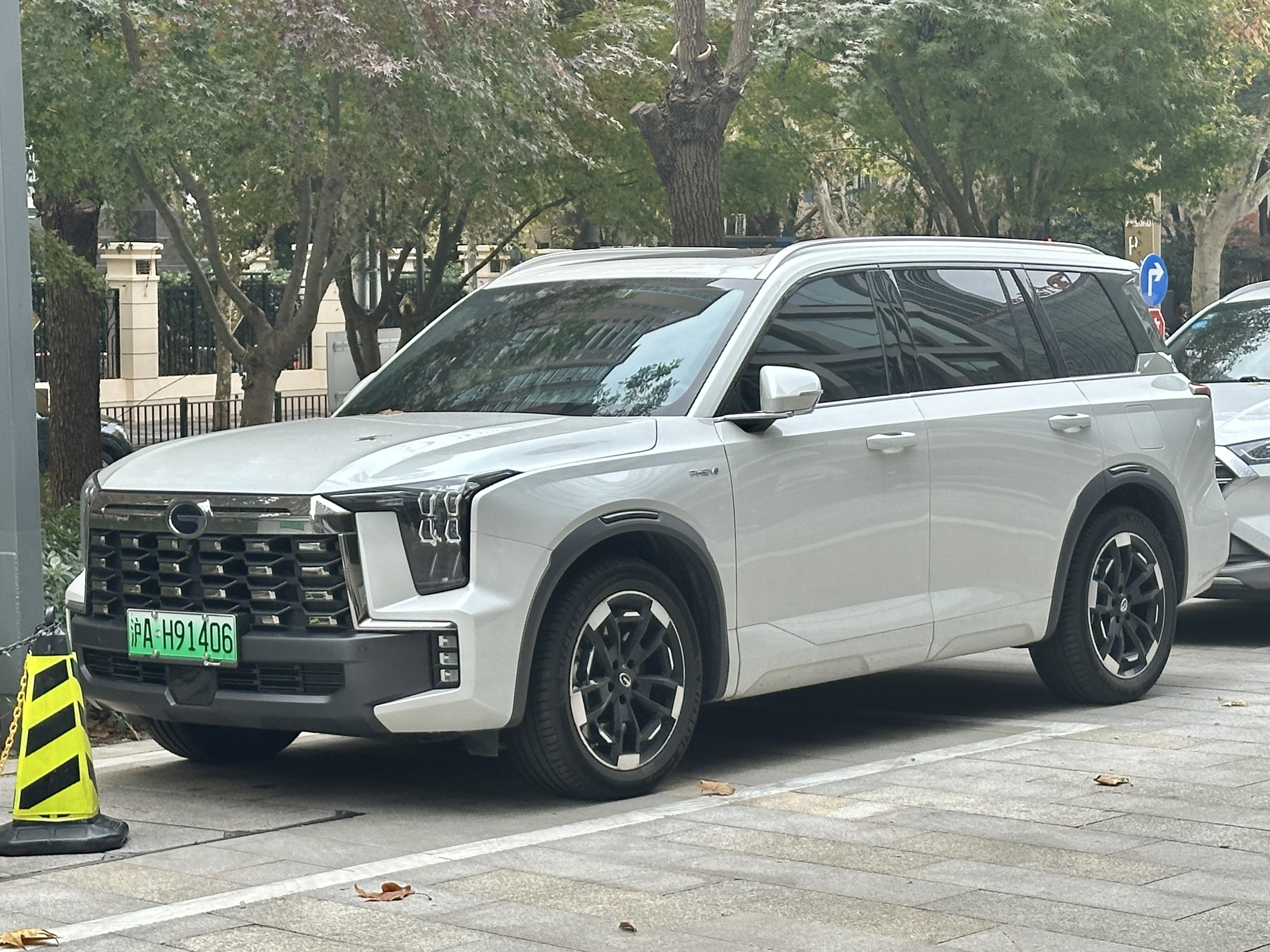
Trumpchi ES9

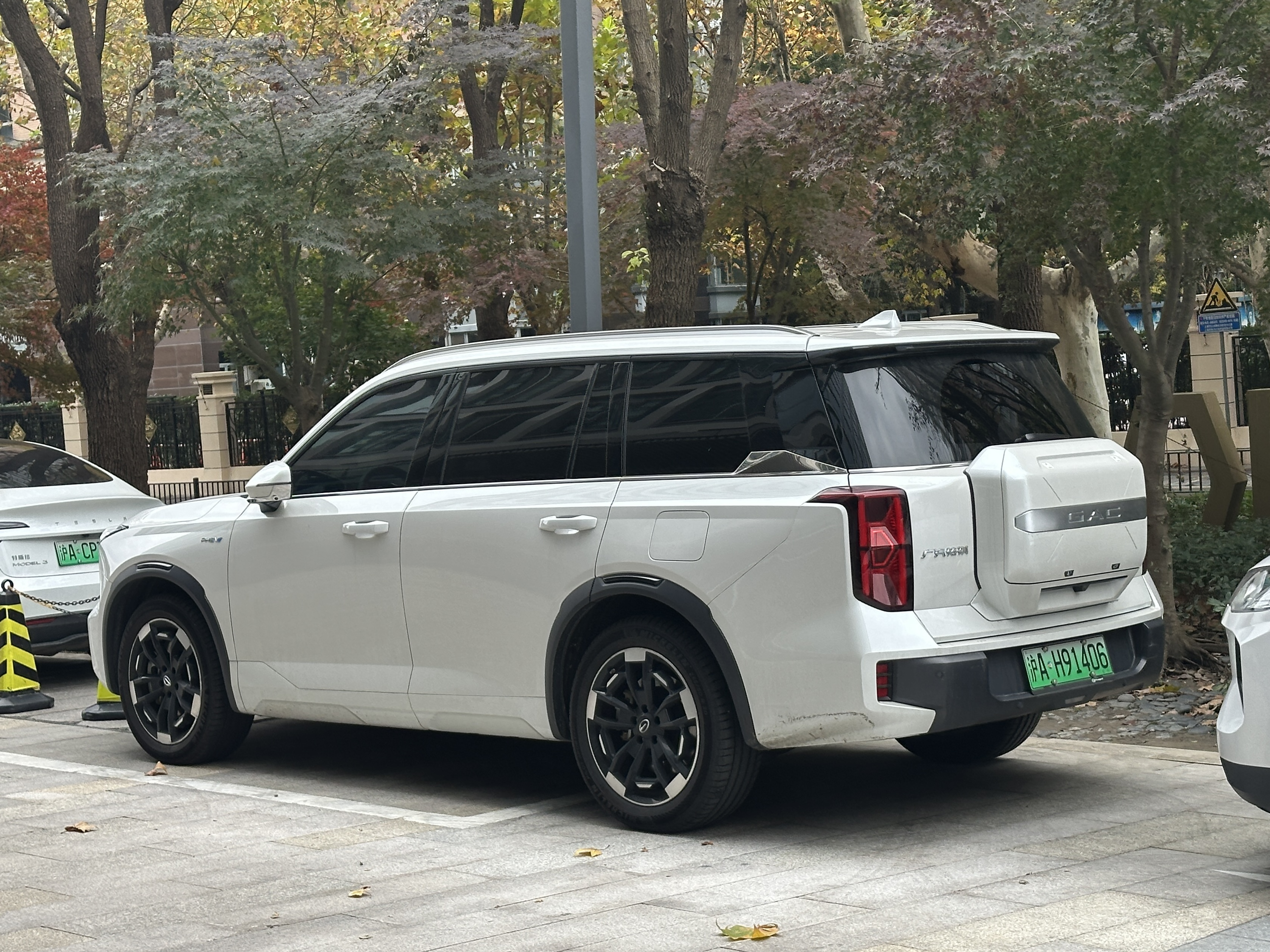
Trumpchi ES9 rear

=== Powertrain ===
Specs
Model	Years	Transmission	Power@rpm	Torque@rpm	0–100 km/h (62 mph)	Top speed
Petrol
GS8	2021–present	8-speed automatic	185 kW (252 PS; 248 hp) at 5,250 rpm	400 N⋅m (295 lb⋅ft; 41 kg⋅m) at 1,750–4,000 rpm		210 km/h (130 mph) (FWD); 200 km/h (124 mph) (AWD)
Hybrid
GS8 Hybrid	2021–present	CVT	174 kW (237 PS; 233 hp)	391 N⋅m (288 lb⋅ft; 40 kg⋅m)	6.9s	190 km/h (118 mph)
Plug-in Hybrid
ES9	2023–present	2-speed DHT	274 kW (373 PS; 367 hp)	630 N⋅m (465 lb⋅ft; 64 kg⋅m)	8.0s	180 km/h (112 mph)

== Sales ==
Year	China		
Year	GS8	ES9	Xiangwang S9
2023	33,528	4,372	—
2024	22,756	8,542	—
2025	26,881	1,336	2,025

== See also ==
- List of GAC vehicles
