= Trumpchi GS7 =

Chinese mid-size SUV

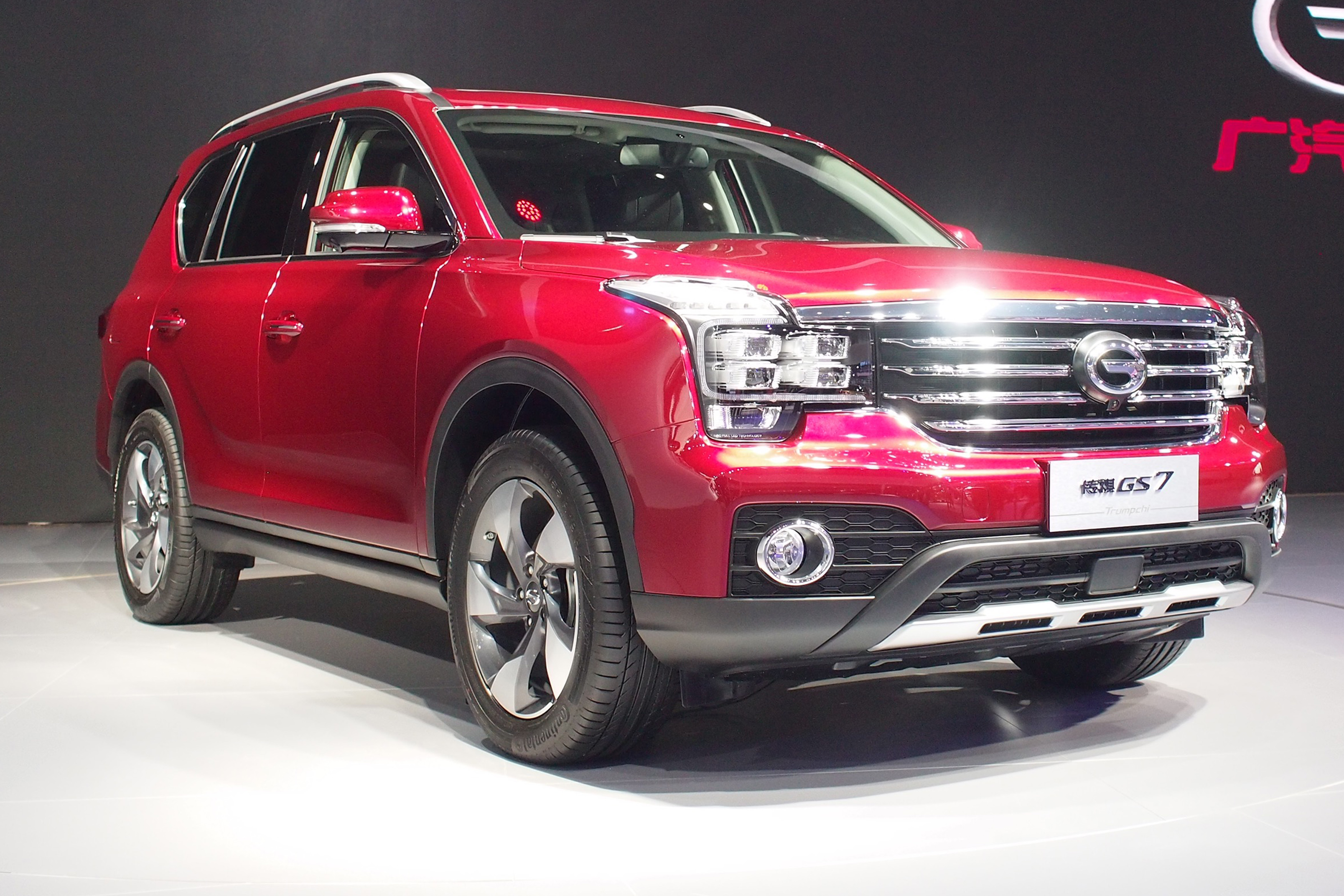
- Trumpchi GS7

Overview
- Manufacturer: GAC Group
- Also called: GAC GS7; Trumpchi GS8S
- Production: 2017–2021
- Assembly: Guangzhou, China

Body and chassis
- Class: Mid-size crossover SUV
- Body style: 5-door SUV
- Layout: Front-engine, front-wheel-drive; Front-engine, all-wheel-drive
- Related: Trumpchi GS8

Powertrain
- Engine: 1.8 L turbo I4 (gasoline); 2.0 L turbo I4 (gasoline)
- Transmission: 6-speed automatic

Dimensions
- Wheelbase: 2,720 mm (107.1 in)
- Length: 4,730 mm (186.2 in)
- Width: 1,910 mm (75.2 in)
- Height: 1,770 mm (69.7 in)

Chronology
- Successor: Trumpchi Xiangwang S7

The Trumpchi GS7, later the Trumpchi GS8S, is a mid-size crossover SUV produced by GAC Group under the Trumpchi brand in China and the GAC Motor brand globally.

== Overview ==
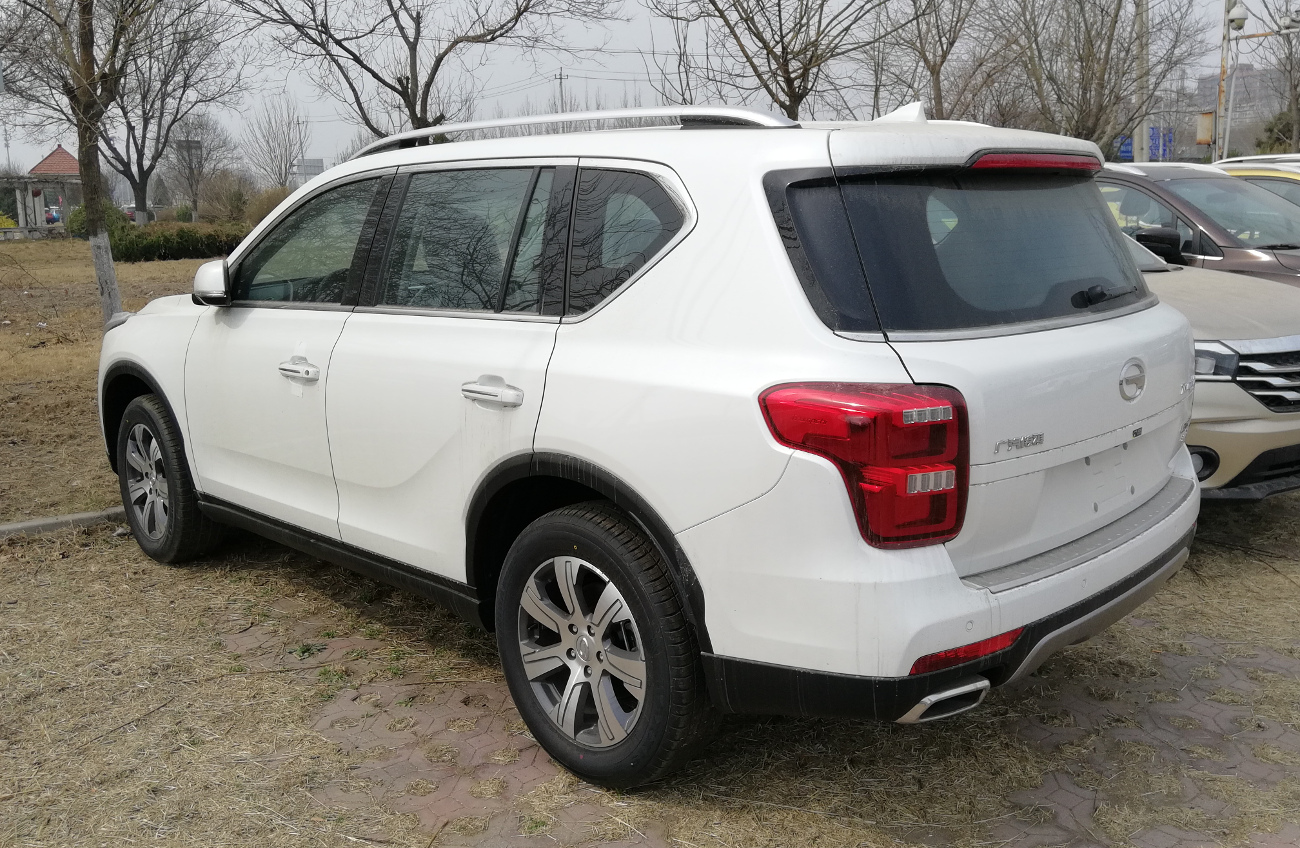
Trumpchi GS7 rear

Being essentially the smaller five-seater version of the larger seven-seater Trumpchi GS8, the GS7 has been redesigned from the C-pillar onward to the rear to differentiate from the larger GS8. The GS7 had a worldwide debut during the Detroit Auto Show, and was launched in China in June 2017 with pricing starting from 155,800 yuan to 230,000 yuan.

As of 2018, the GS7 is powered by the 2.0-litre four-cylinder turbo engine and six-speed automatic transmission developed in-house by GAC. The 2.0-litre multi-port injected inline-4 engine includes auto start/stop and delivers 198 hp (201 PS; 148 kW) and 320 N⋅m (236 lb⋅ft) of torque. The AWD system is also offered which includes a requisite terrain response knob, featuring sand, trail, snow, and normal scenario settings.

=== Trumpchi GS8S ===
The Trumpchi GS8S was launched in April 2020. Essentially a facelifted GS7, the GS8S sits slightly below the regular GS8 as a 5-seater Trumpchi GS8, the exterior difference being the front and rear parts with the later model having a redesigned and more aggressive front grille. It is powered by a redesigned 2.0-litre direct-injection turbocharged engine. The engine produces a maximum power of 252 PS (249 hp; 185 kW) and peak torque of 390 N⋅m (39.8 kg⋅m; 288 lb⋅ft) and meets the China-6 emission standards. Transmission is a 6-speed automatic gearbox.

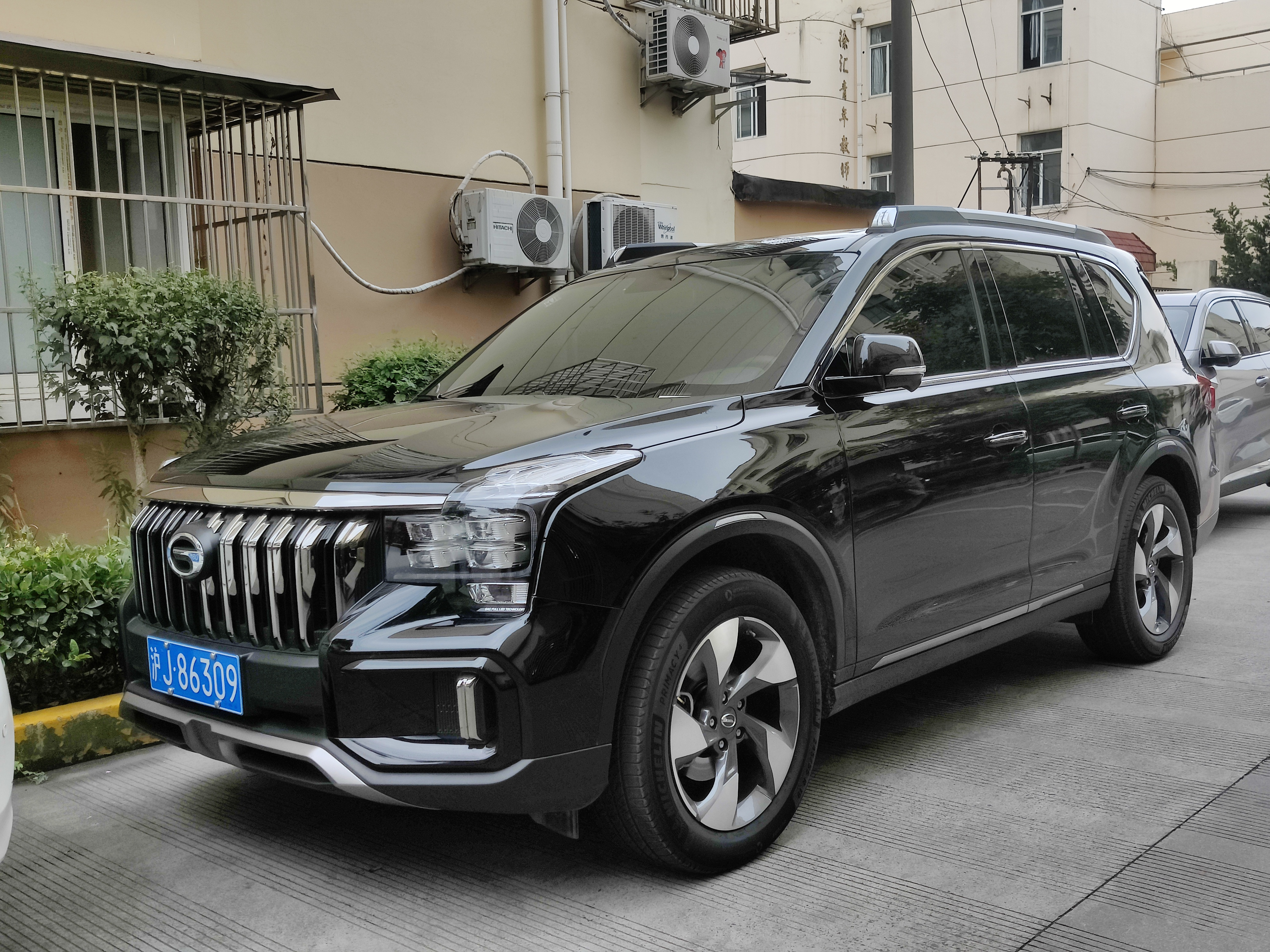
Trumpchi GS8S front.

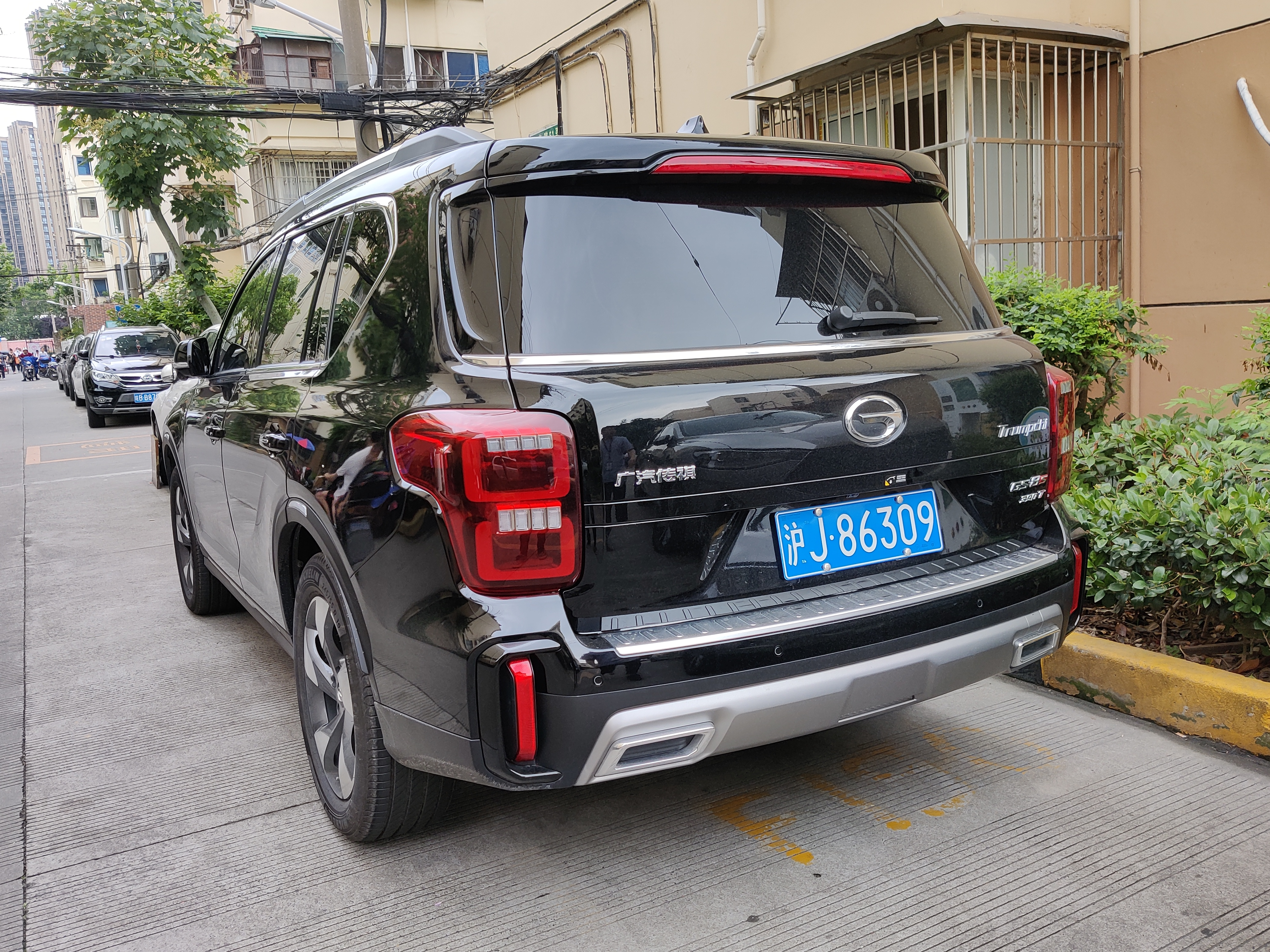
Trumpchi GS8S rear.

== See also ==
- List of GAC vehicles
