= Trumpchi Xiangwang S7 =

Mid-size crossover SUV

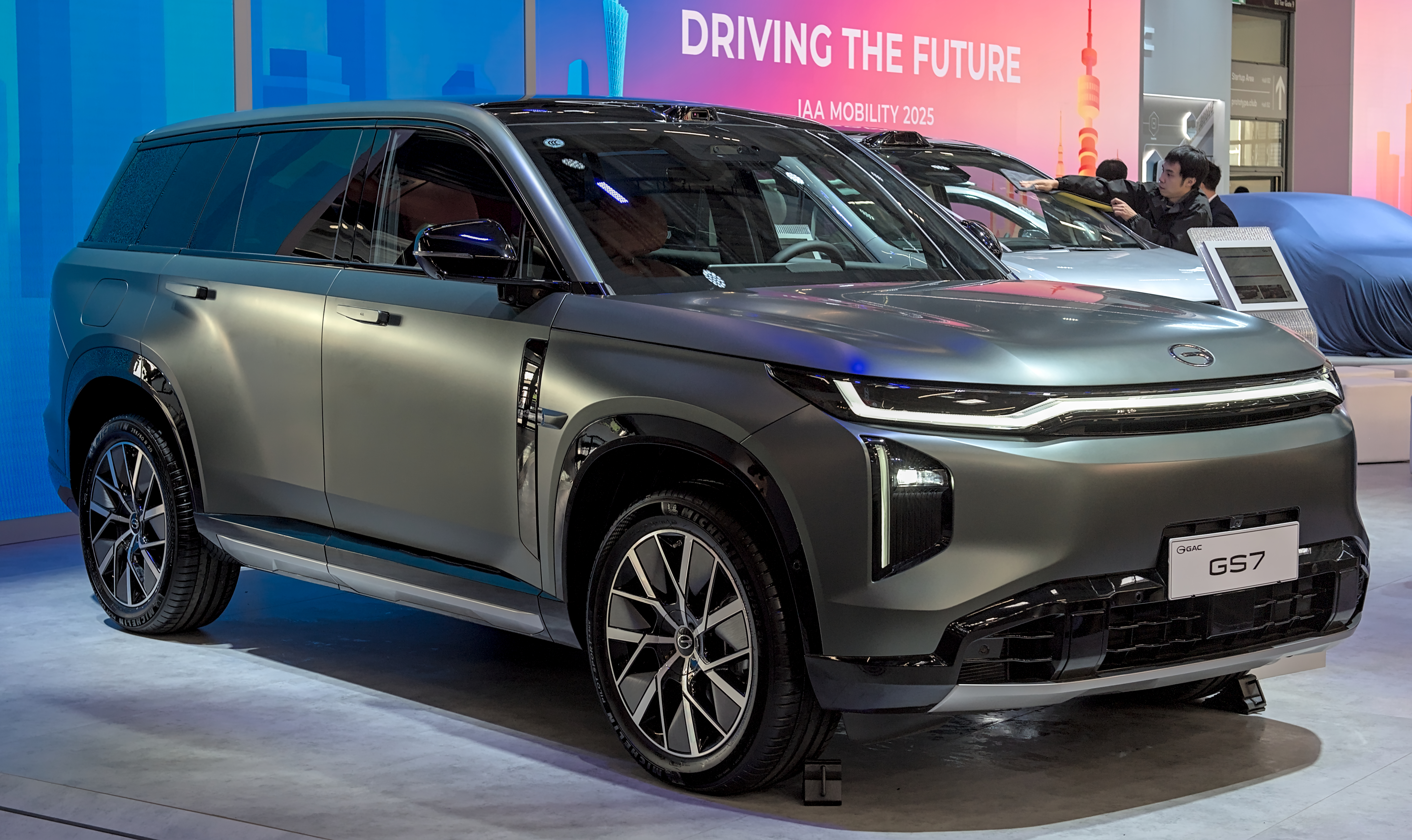

Overview
- Manufacturer: GAC Motor
- Also called: GAC GS7 (export); UMO 8 (Russia)
- Production: 2025–present
- Assembly: China: Guangzhou

Body and chassis
- Class: Mid-size crossover SUV
- Body style: 5-door SUV
- Layout: Front-engine, front-wheel-drive; Front-engine, all-wheel-drive
- Platform: EV+
- Related: Trumpchi Xiangwang S9

Dimensions
- Wheelbase: 2,880 mm (113.4 in)
- Length: 4,900 mm (192.9 in)
- Width: 1,950 mm (76.8 in)
- Height: 1,780 mm (70.1 in)
- Curb weight: 2,030–2,260 kg (4,475–4,982 lb)

Chronology
- Predecessor: Trumpchi GS7

The Trumpchi Xiangwang S7 (Chinese: 向往S7) is a mid-size crossover SUV produced by GAC Group under the Trumpchi brand in China.

== Overview ==
The Xiangwang S7 was presented in November 2024 at the Guangzhou Auto Show. It has been sold on the Chinese market since March 2025.

Rear view

Interior

== Specifications ==
The five-seater vehicle is 4.90 meters long, 1.95 meters wide, and 1.78 meters high. It is designed as a plug-in hybrid. It combines a turbocharged 1.5-liter gasoline engine with one or two electric motors. A lithium iron phosphate battery with an energy content of 21.3 or 36.3 kWh enables an electric range of up to 205 km according to the Worldwide Harmonized Light Vehicles Test Procedure (CLTC) driving cycle. The top speed is 185 km/h.

== Sales ==
| Year | China |
|---|---|
| 2025 | 13,529 |
