= GAC Motor =

Chinese automobile company

GAC Motor Co., Ltd.
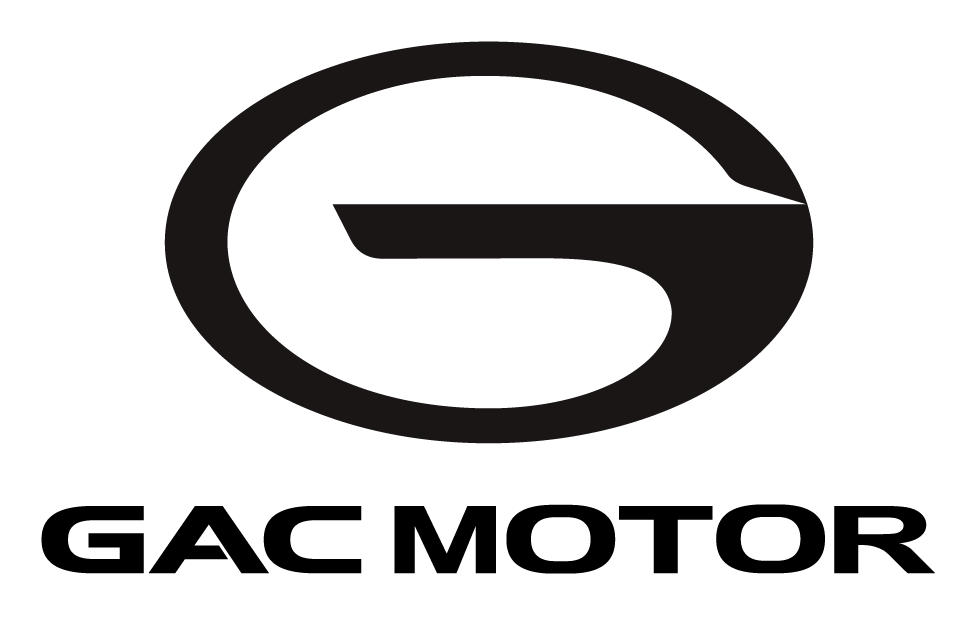
- Logo used internationally except China
- Native name: 广汽传祺汽车有限公司
- Founded: July 21, 2008; 18 years ago
- Headquarters: Guangzhou, China
- Parent: GAC Group
- Website: gac-motor.com

GAC Motor Co., Ltd. (Chinese: 广汽传祺汽车有限公司; lit. 'GAC Trumpchi Automotive Co. Ltd.'), sometimes simply as GAC, is a Chinese automobile manufacturing company founded in 2008, with headquarters in Guangzhou. Wholly owned by GAC Group, it focuses on making complete vehicles, auto parts and their trading.

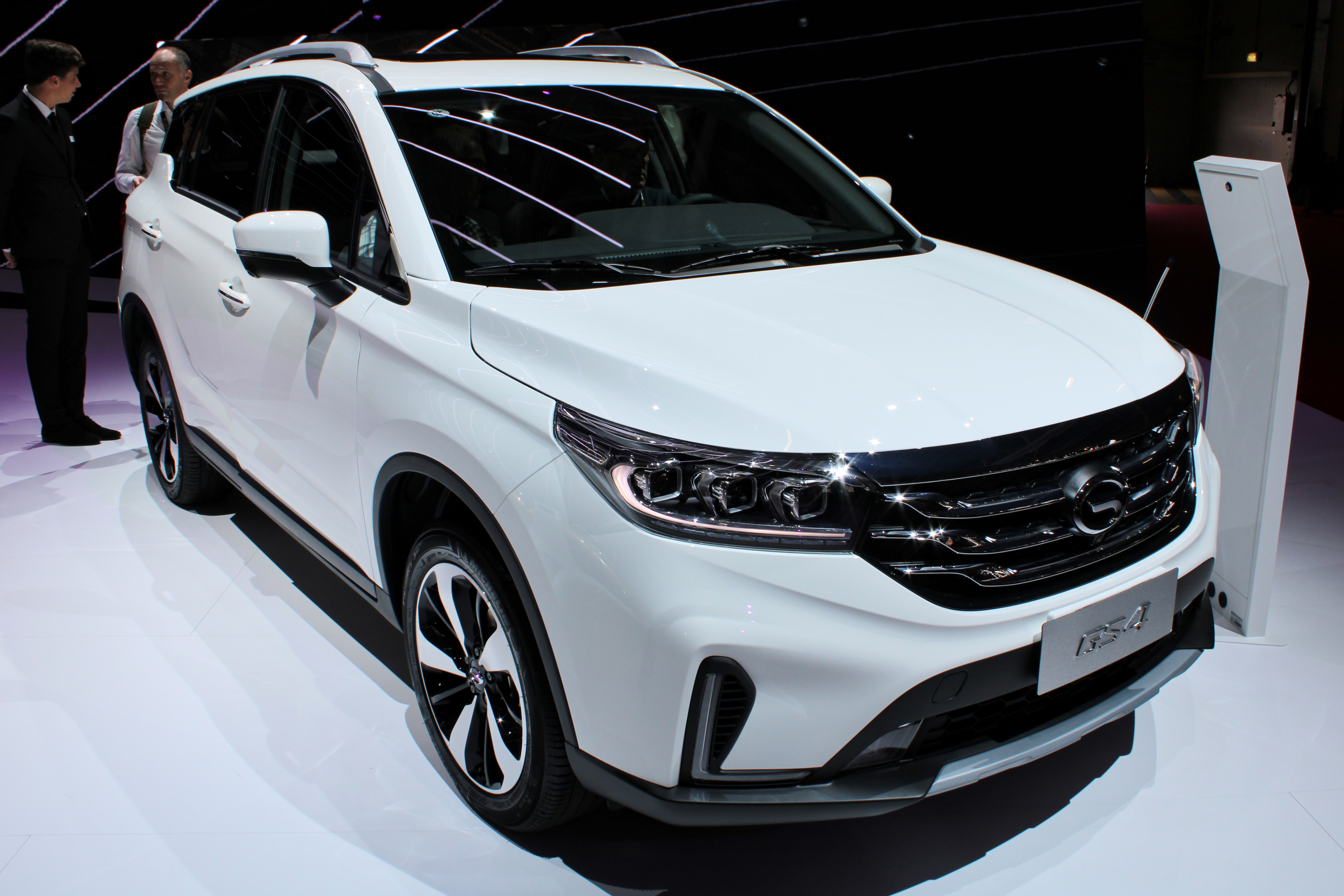
GAC GS4

GAC Motor made its first foray into overseas markets in 2013. As of November 2021, it has entered the markets of the Middle East, Europe, Latin America, Asia and Africa. In addition, the company set up exclusive distributors in several countries.

== History ==
GAC Motor set up the International Business Department to arrange its overseas export operations in 2013. In the same year, it participated in the Detroit Auto Show for the first time as the only Chinese automaker.

It introduced the GA6 in 2014. The company rolled out its first 7-seat SUV, the GS8, in 2016. In January 2017, it premiered three new models at the Detroit Auto Show, the GS7, the GE3 and the EnSpirit plug-in hybrid concept. In the same year, GAC Motor opened a R&D center in Silicon Valley.

It stepped into Russia in December 2019.

In July 2024, GAC Motor announced operation in Brazil.

In July 2024, the company's Chinese name changed from 广汽乘用车有限公司 (lit. GAC Passenger Car Co. Ltd.) to 广汽传祺汽车有限公司 (lit. GAC Trumpchi Automotive Co., Ltd.).

== Products ==
- GAC Smilodon, mid-size pickup truck
