= Hyptec GT =

Battery electric executive sedan

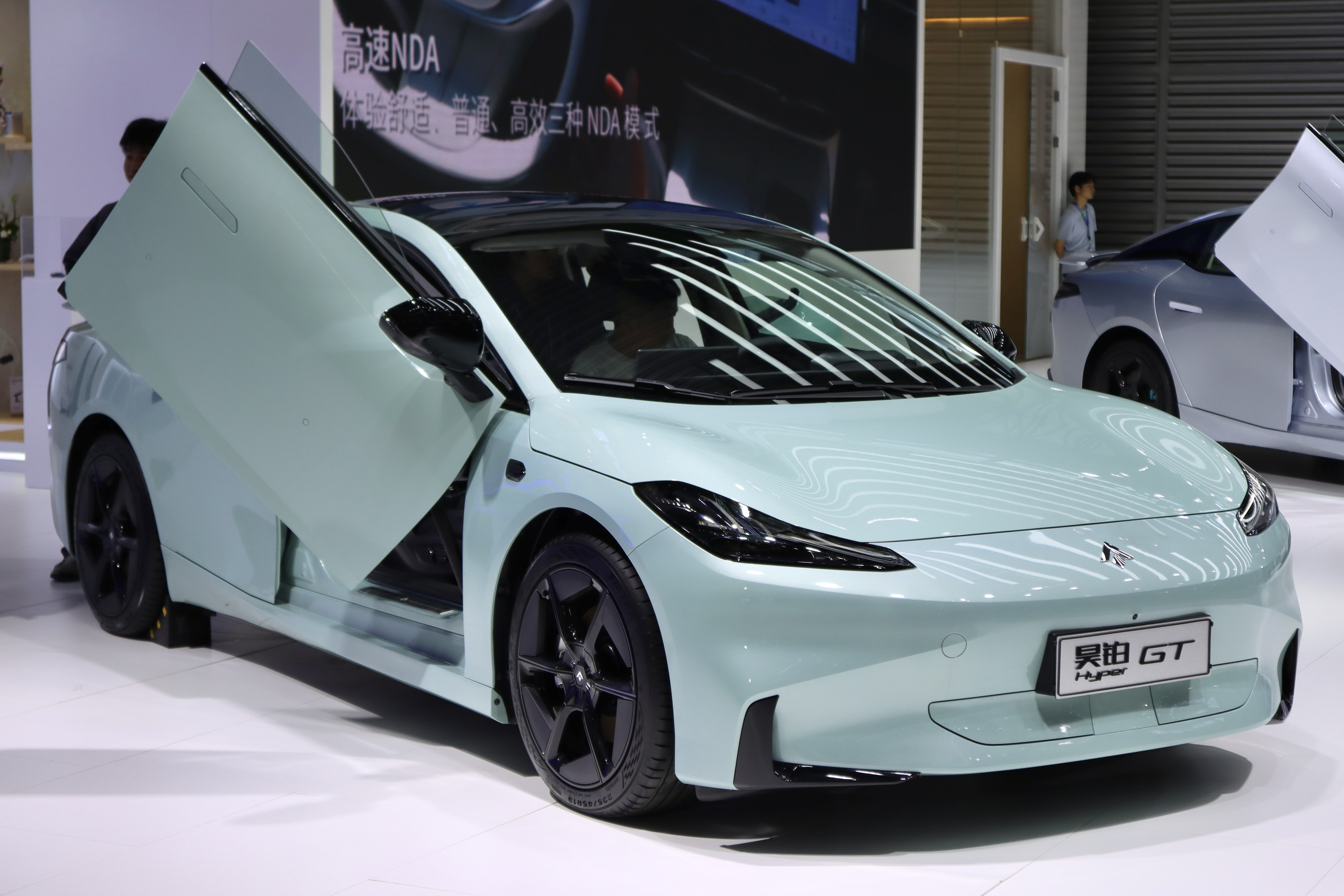

Overview
- Manufacturer: GAC Aion
- Production: 2023–present

Body and chassis
- Class: Executive car (E)
- Layout: Rear-motor, rear-wheel drive

The Hyptec GT (Chinese: 广汽昊铂GT; pinyin: Guǎngqì Hàobó GT) or previously Hyper GT and the succeeding Aion Ray 7 is a battery electric executive sedan produced by Chinese automobile manufacturer GAC Aion and sold under its premium electric vehicle brand Hyptec and later, Aion. When the Hyptec GT production starts, it was the second vehicle of the Hyptec series after the Hyptec SSR sports car.

In August 2024, GAC Aion was announced the renaming of the Hyper brand's English name to Hyptec.

== Hyptec GT ==
Hyptec GT
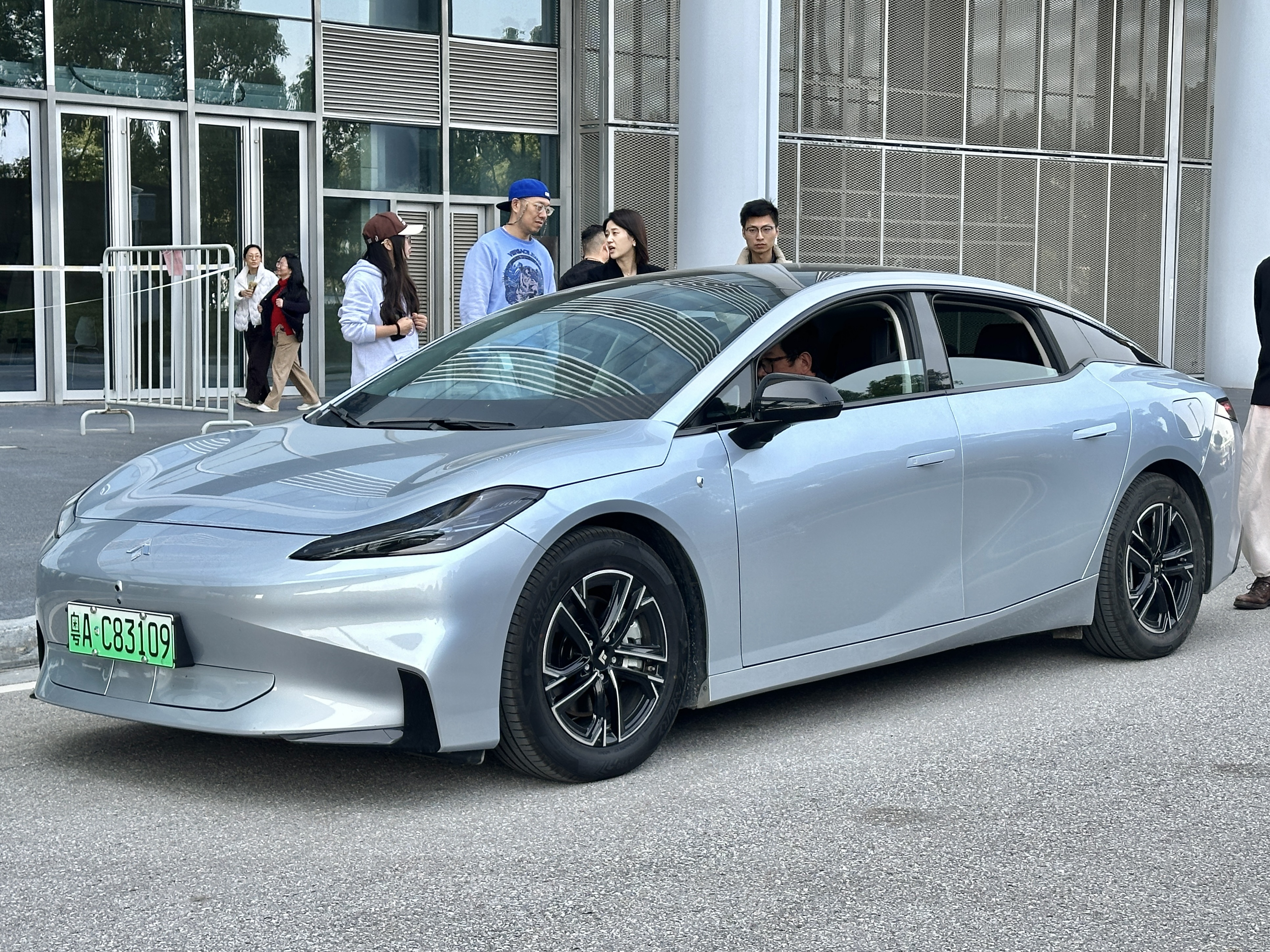

Overview
- Manufacturer: GAC Aion
- Also called: Hyper GT (2023–2024)
- Production: 2023–present
- Assembly: China: Guangzhou
- Designer: Xiaolin Xu

Body and chassis
- Class: Executive car (E)
- Body style: 4-door sedan
- Layout: Rear-motor, rear-wheel drive
- Platform: AEP 3.0
- Doors: Scissor doors (front for specific variants); Conventional doors
- Related: Toyota bZ7

Powertrain
- Electric motor: Permanent magnet synchronous
- Power output: 180–250 kW (245–340 PS; 241–335 hp)
- Battery: 60 kWh NMC Eve Energy; 60 kWh LFP Eve Energy; 70 kWh LFP CALB; 70 kWh NMC Eve Energy; 80 kWh NMC Yaoneng; 80 kWh NMC Eve Energy
- Electric range: 560–710 km (348–441 mi)

Dimensions
- Wheelbase: 2,920 mm (115.0 in)
- Length: 4,886 mm (192.4 in)
- Width: 1,917 mm (75.5 in)
- Height: 1,449 mm (57.0 in)
- Curb weight: 1,780–2,110 kg (3,924–4,652 lb)

The Hyptec GT was revealed on 30 December 2022 at Auto Guangzhou. It is planned to begin production and go on sale in October 2023.

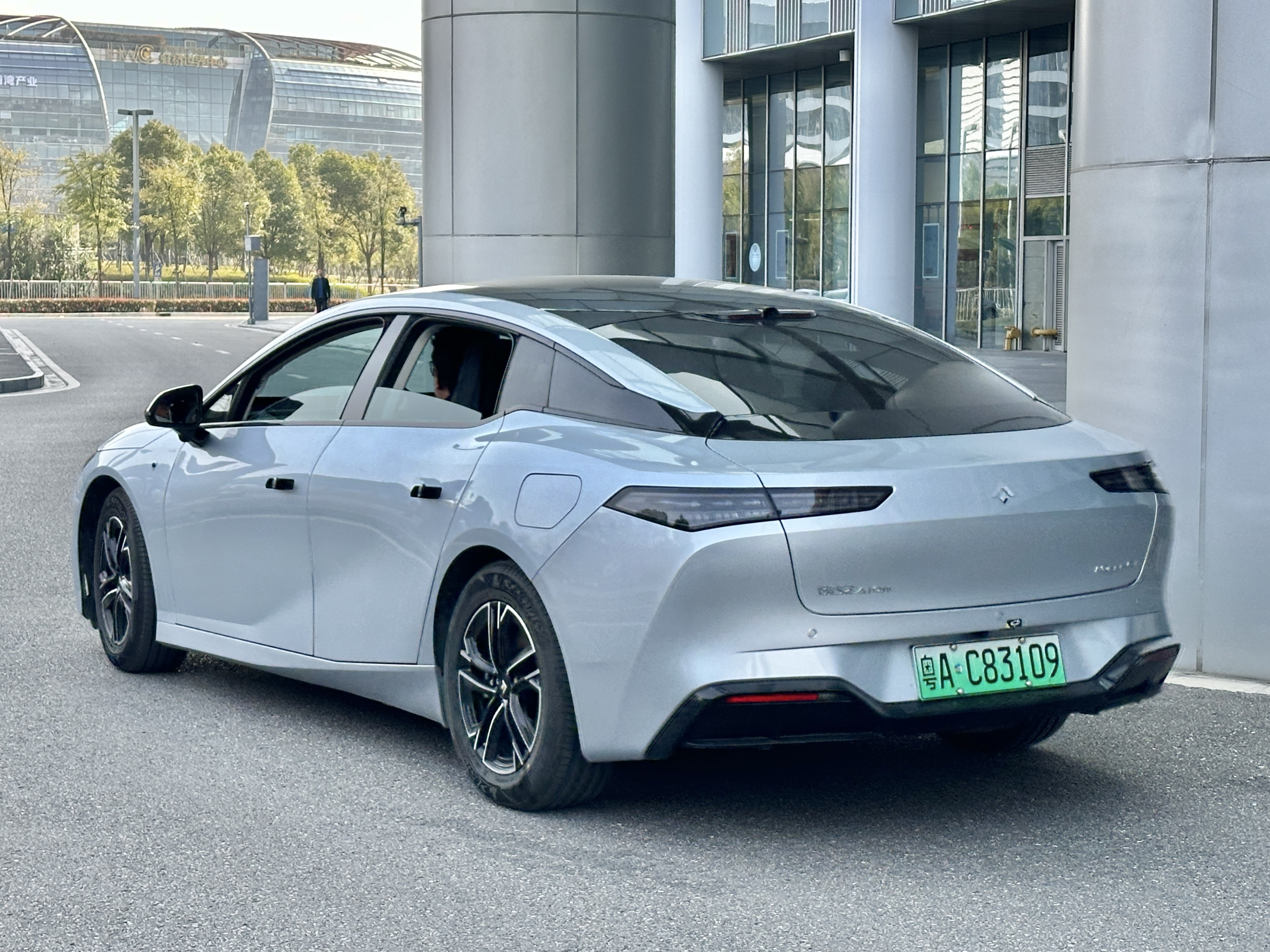
Rear view

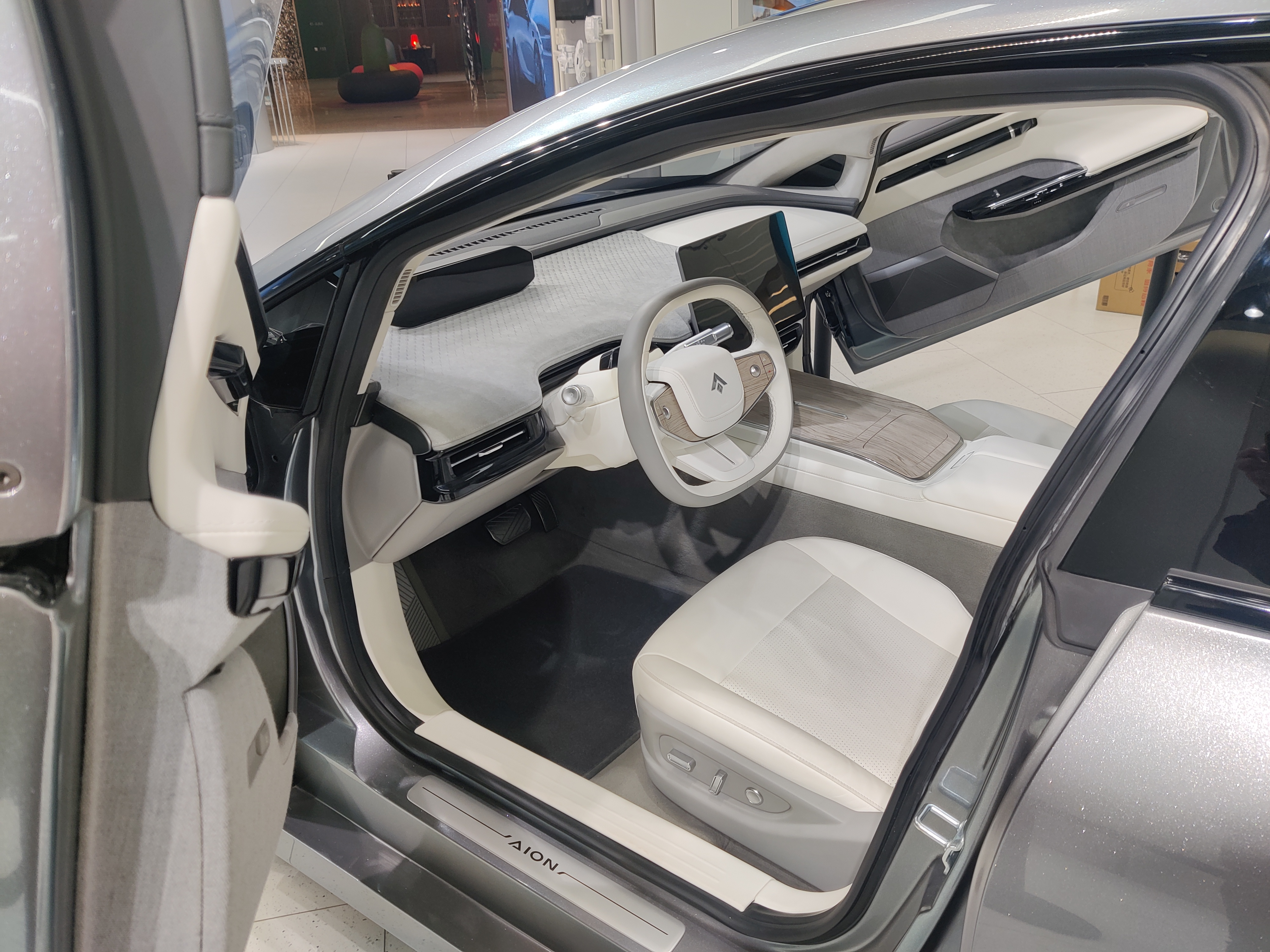
Interior

According to Hyptec, when production of the Hyptec GT begins, it will have the lowest-ever wind resistance coefficient of any mass-production car at 0.19 C_{d}. The GAC research and development team used aerodynamic design cues featured in previous concepts such as the GAC ENO.146 and TIME to achieve the low drag coefficient of the Hyptec GT.

The Hyptec GT is based on GAC's AEP 3.0 platform.

=== Powertrain ===
The GT is available only in rear-wheel drive, with either a 180 kW (245 PS; 241 hp) or 250 kW (340 PS; 335 hp) permanent magnet synchronous motor. The 80 kWh NMC battery pack is supplied by Yaoneng New Energy, a joint venture between Geely and Farasis. It has a top speed of 180 km/h (112 mph).

Specs
Years	Battery		Layout	Power	Torque	Range	30–80% charge	0–100 km/h (62 mph)	Kerb weight
Years	Type	Weight	Layout	Power	Torque	CLTC	30–80% charge	0–100 km/h (62 mph)	Kerb weight
2023–present	60 kWh NMC Eve Energy	403 kg (888 lb)	RWD	180 kW (245 PS; 241 hp)	355 N⋅m (262 lb⋅ft)	560 km (348 mi)	30 min	6.5 s	1,780 kg (3,924 lb)
2025–present	60.046 kWh LFP Eve Energy	434 kg (957 lb)	RWD	180 kW (245 PS; 241 hp)	355 N⋅m (262 lb⋅ft)	560 km (348 mi)		6.5 s	1,870 kg (4,123 lb)
2023–2024	70.05 kWh LFP CALB	498 kg (1,098 lb)	RWD	180 kW (245 PS; 241 hp)	355 N⋅m (262 lb⋅ft)	600 km (373 mi)	35 min	6.5 s	1,880 kg (4,145 lb)
2024–present	70.803 kWh NMC Eve Energy	444 kg (979 lb)	RWD	180 kW (245 PS; 241 hp)	355 N⋅m (262 lb⋅ft)	630 km (391 mi)		6.5 s	1,880 kg (4,145 lb)
2023–2025	80.062 kWh NMC Yaoneng	490 kg (1,080 lb)	RWD	250 kW (340 PS; 335 hp)	430 N⋅m (317 lb⋅ft)	710 km (441 mi)	22 min	4.9 s	1,920 kg (4,233 lb)
2025–present	83.326 kWh LFP Eve Energy	605 kg (1,334 lb)	RWD	250 kW (340 PS; 335 hp)	430 N⋅m (317 lb⋅ft)	710 km (441 mi)	22 min	4.9 s	2,110 kg (4,652 lb)

=== Safety ===
C-NCAP (2021) test results 2023 Hyper GT 560 Technology
Category		%
Overall:	5 /5 stars	89.9%
Occupant protection:		94.76%
Vulnerable road users:		68.29%
Active safety:		91.22%

== Aion Ray 7 ==
Aion Ray 7

Overview
- Manufacturer: GAC Aion
- Production: 2026–present
- Assembly: China: Guangzhou

Body and chassis
- Class: Executive car (E)
- Body style: 4-door sedan
- Layout: Rear-motor, rear-wheel drive

Powertrain
- Electric motor: 180 kW TZ180XYC01 PMSM
- Power output: 242 hp (180 kW; 245 PS)
- Battery: 45.58 kWh LFP GAC Inpow; 62.98 kWh LFP CATL
- Electric range: 530–702 km (329–436 mi) (CLTC)

Dimensions
- Wheelbase: 2,920 mm (115.0 in)
- Length: 4,960 mm (195.3 in)
- Width: 1,900 mm (74.8 in)
- Height: 1,455 mm (57.3 in)
- Curb weight: 1,720–1,855 kg (3,792–4,090 lb)

In July 2026, Aion announced that a new series named "Ray" would be launched, with the first model being the Ray 7, a restyled variant of the Hyptec GT to be sold at a significantly lower price point. The Ray 7 was launched on 12 November 2026. Based on the same platform, the chassis is optimized via chip-level integrated drive and braking architecture. Resulted in what Aion claims to be a super chassis.

The Ray 7 has a drag coefficient of 0.22C_{d}.

The Ray 7 has double wishbone front and five-link independent rear suspension geometries, with adaptive dampers standard with the larger battery. The top trim level is equipped with a Huawei DriveONE electromechanical braking system and iTrack torque control system.

The interior features an 8.8-inch digital instrument cluster and a 15.6-inch 2.5K-resolution central infotainment touchscreen, and is powered by a Qualcomm Snapdragon 8295P chip with 24GB of RAM and 128GB of UFS storage. It has a 67-watt USB-C charging port and 50-watt active-cooled wireless charging pad. It comes standard with a 7-speaker sound system, which can be optionally upgraded to a 1,440-watt 17-speaker sound system.

It has an optional GAC GSD ADAS system using WeRide's driving model with a sensor suite consisting of one Huawei 192-line roof-mounted LiDAR, 3 4D mmWave radars, 11 cameras, and 12 ultrasonic sensors. It is capable of Level 2 supervised autonomous driving in highway and urban conditions.

Rear view

Interior

=== Powertrain ===
The Ray 7 is available exclusively as with a battery electric powertrain. All variants use a Huawei DriveONE permanent magnet synchronous motor drive unit powering the rear axle outputting 242 hp (180 kW; 245 PS) and 235 N⋅m (173 lb⋅ft) of torque. It is equipped with either a 45.6 kWh LFP battery pack supplied by GAC subsidiary Inpow providing 530 kilometres (329 mi) of range, or a 63.0 kWh LFP pack supplied by CATL providing 702 kilometres (436 mi) of range; both are capable of recharging 30–80% within 22 minutes. The performance package available with the larger battery is equipped with high-performance tires and has a lower range of 600 kilometres (373 mi).

Specifications
Battery		Motor		Range	30–80% charge	0–100 km/h (62 mph)	Top speed	Kerb weight
Type	Weight	Power	Torque	CLTC	30–80% charge	0–100 km/h (62 mph)	Top speed	Kerb weight
45.58 kWh LFP Inpei	327 kg (721 lb)	242 hp (180 kW; 245 PS)	235 N⋅m (173 lb⋅ft)	530 km (329 mi)	22 min	7.4 s	180 km/h (112 mph)	1,720 kg (3,792 lb)
62.98 kWh LFP CATL	440 kg (970 lb)	242 hp (180 kW; 245 PS)	235 N⋅m (173 lb⋅ft)	702 km (436 mi)	21 min	6.9 s	180 km/h (112 mph)	1,855 kg (4,090 lb)
62.98 kWh LFP CATL	440 kg (970 lb)	242 hp (180 kW; 245 PS)	235 N⋅m (173 lb⋅ft)	600 km (373 mi)	21 min	6.9 s	180 km/h (112 mph)	1,855 kg (4,090 lb)

=== Sales ===
Year	China
2023	3,592
2024	5,542
2025	2,745
