= Hyptec =

Chinese electric car brand owned by GAC Aion

- Formerly: Hyper (2022–2024)
- Type: Brand
- Industry: Automotive
- Founded: September 2022; 3 years ago
- Headquarters: Guangzhou, China
- Area served: China; Southeast Asia
- Key people: Zhang Fangyou
- Products: Electric vehicles
- Parent: GAC Aion

Chinese name
- Simplified Chinese: 广汽昊铂
- Hanyu Pinyin: Guǎngqì Hàobó
- Website: hyptec.com

Hyptec (Chinese: 广汽昊铂; pinyin: Guǎngqì Hàobó) is a Chinese electric vehicle brand owned by GAC Aion, the electric vehicle subsidiary of GAC Group. It was founded in 2022 under the name Hyper, before it was renamed in 2024. The brand serves as a premium product line of GAC Aion, which uses the Aion brand for mass-market electric vehicles.

The name "Hyptec" derives from a combination of the words "hyper" and "technology".

== History ==
In September 2022, GAC Aion presented its plans to expand its portfolio with a new brand called Hyper. It was created to fill the niche of more expensive, more technically advanced and more luxurious electric cars.

Hyper's first product is the Hyper SSR hypercar. Production of the SSR began in October 2023. In 2023, the Hyper lineup was further expanded with a second model, the Hyper GT sedan, which was first revealed through a set of images in December 2022 and went on sale in July 2023. In October of the same year, the mid-size SUV coupe Hyper HT debuted, with sales beginning in the domestic market in November 2023. In August 2024, the brand name was changed from Hyper to Hyptec.

In December 2025, GAC Group launched the reform of its own brand BU (Business Unit), with Hyptec and Aion BU being the first to be established, and the two brands were incorporated into the same business unit for unified operation.

== Products ==
- Hyptec A800 (2026–present), full-size sedan, EREV
- Hyptec SSR (2023–present), sports car, BEV
- Hyptec GT (2023–present), mid-size Sedan, BEV
- Hyptec HT (2023–present), mid-size SUV, BEV
  - Hyptec S600 (2026–present), EREV/BEV
- Hyptec HL (2025–present), full-size SUV, BEV
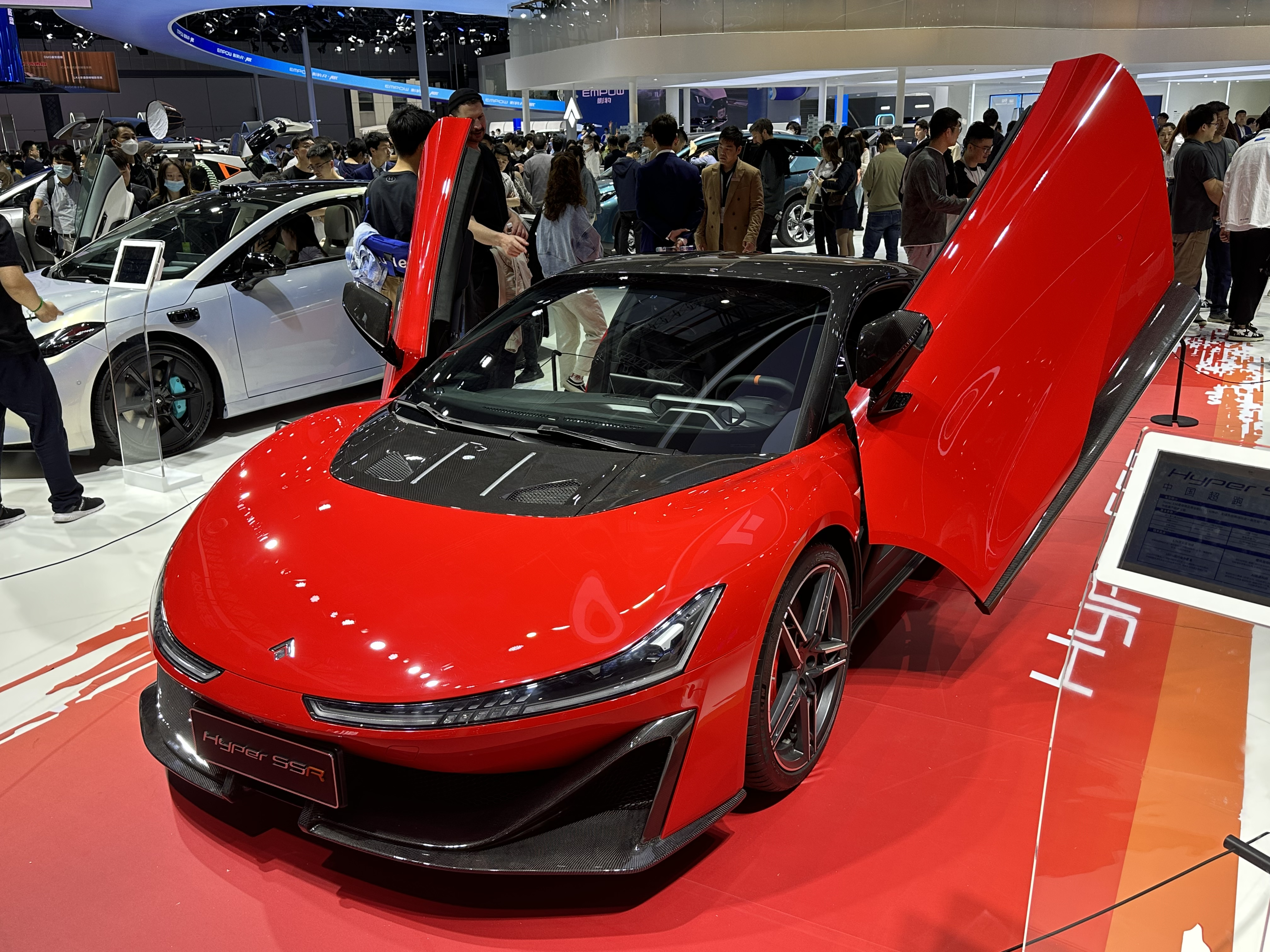
Hyptec SSR

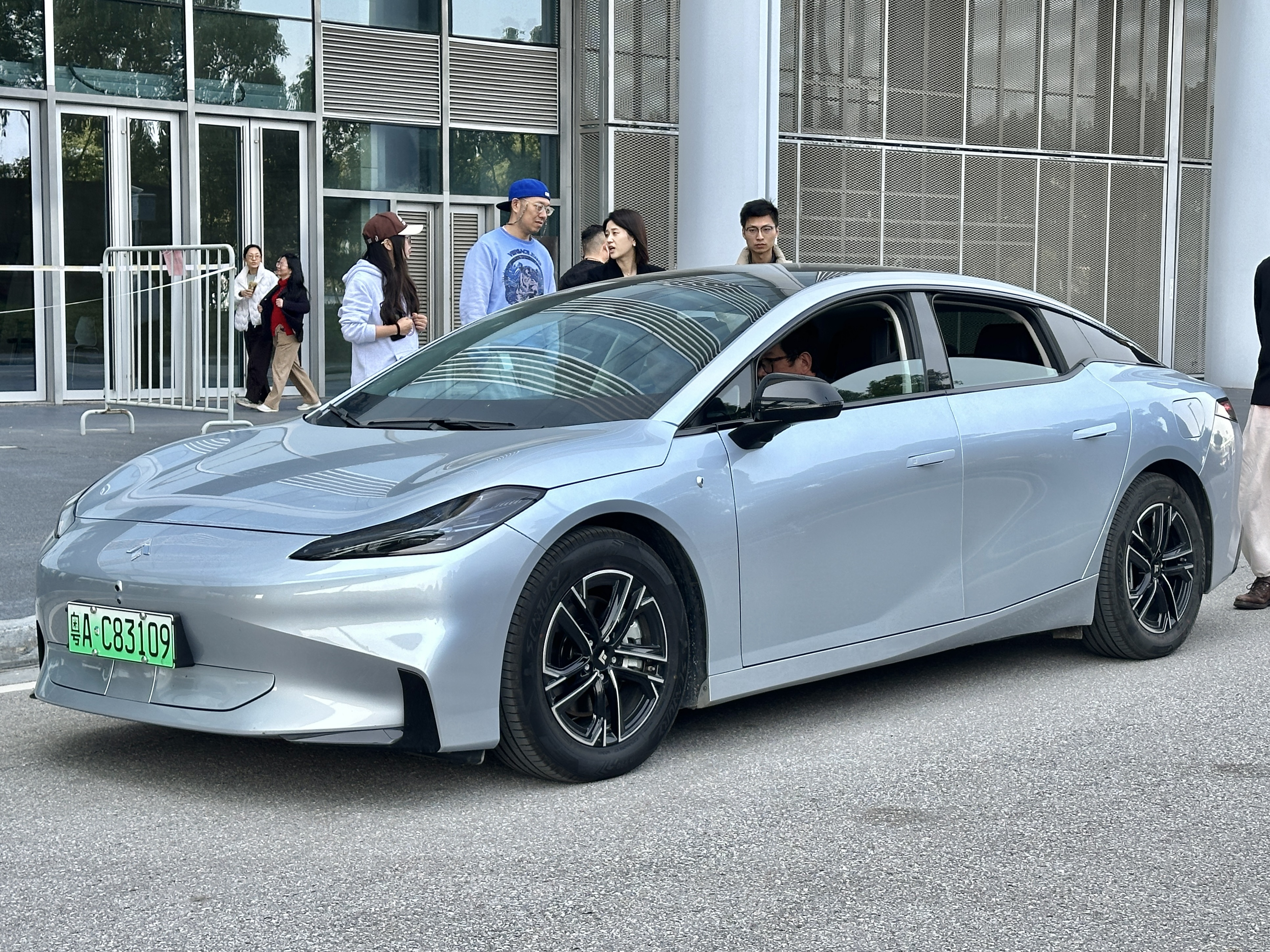
Hyptec GT

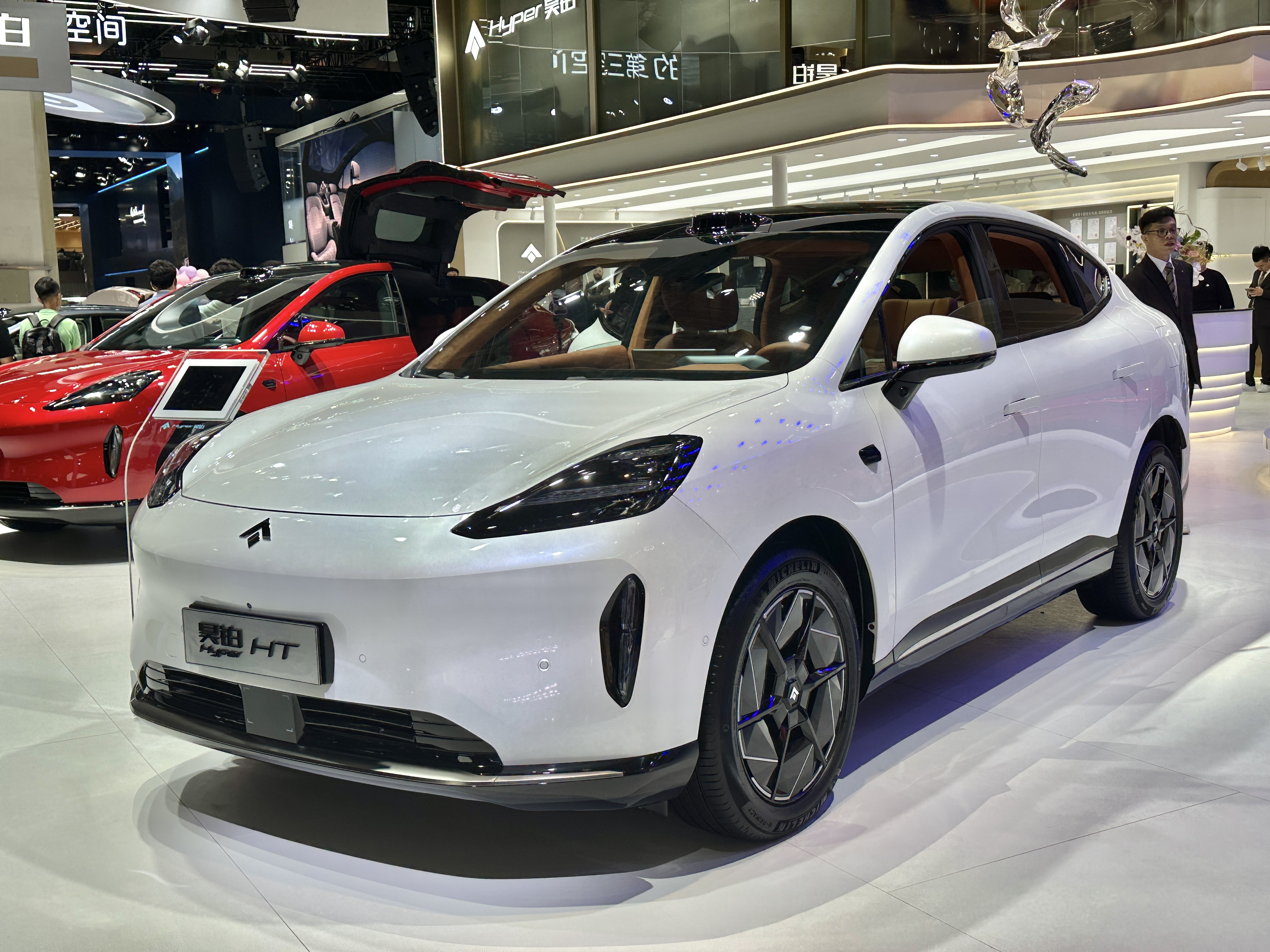
Hyptec HT

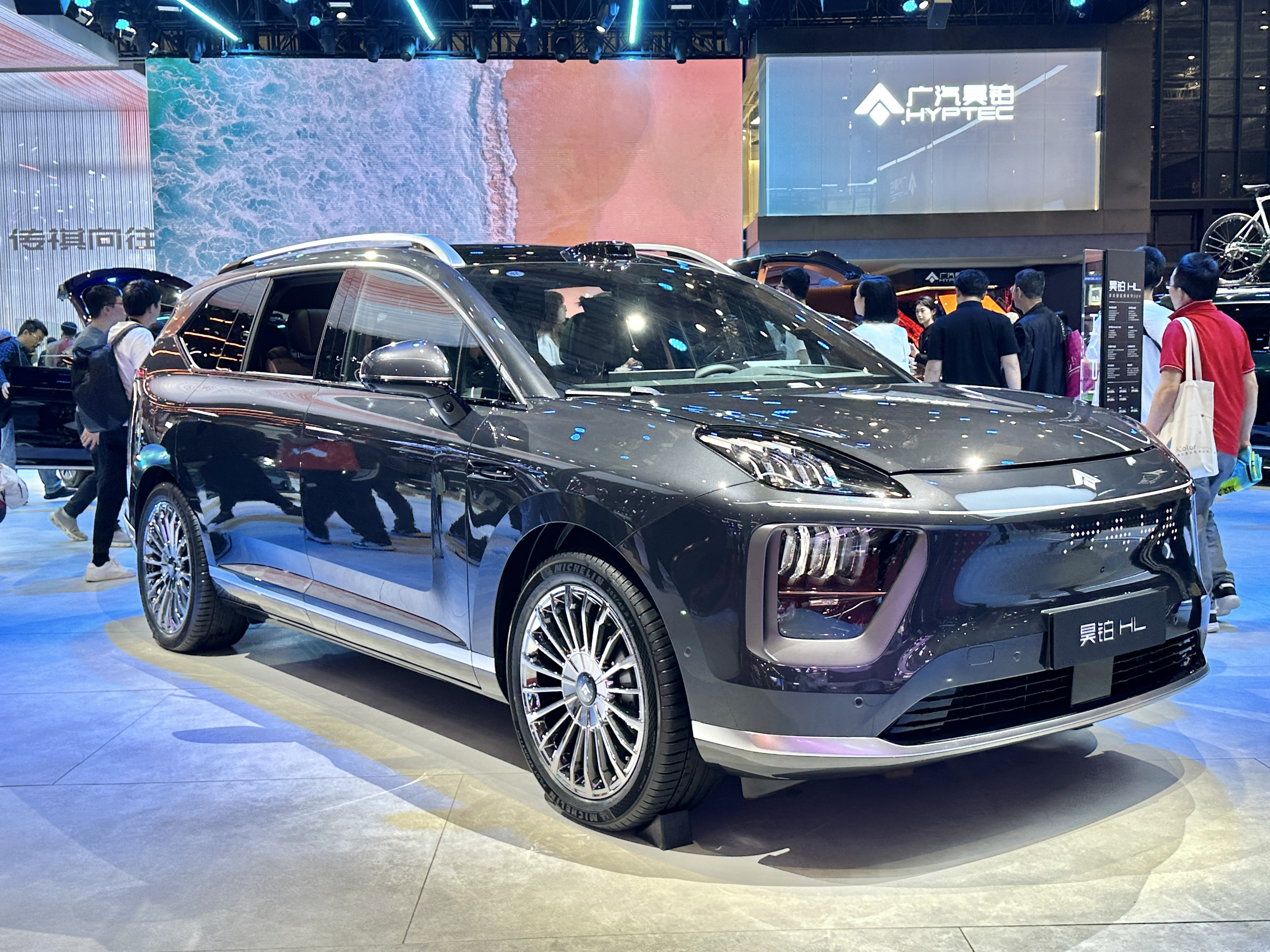
Hyptec HL

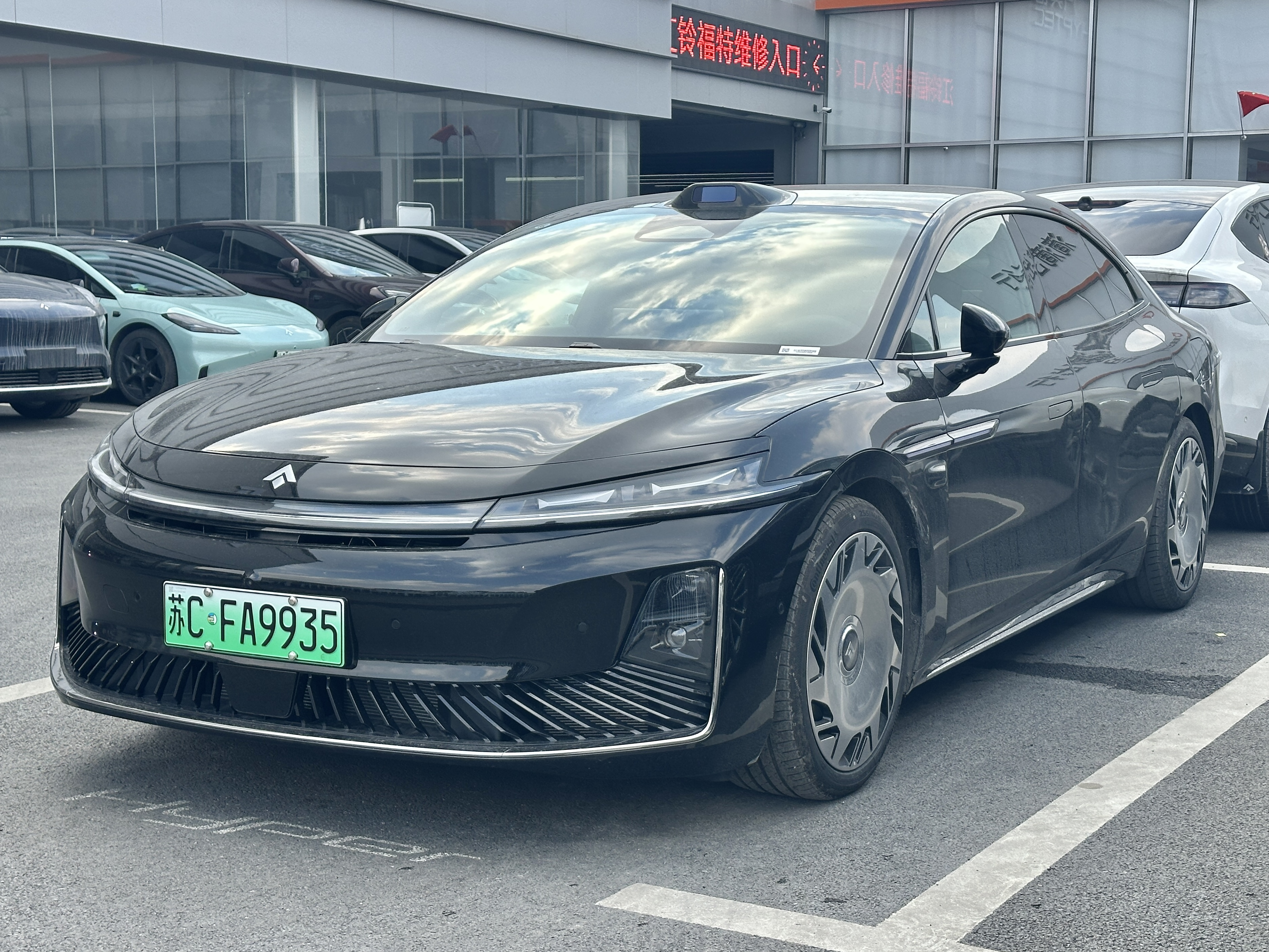
Hyptec A800

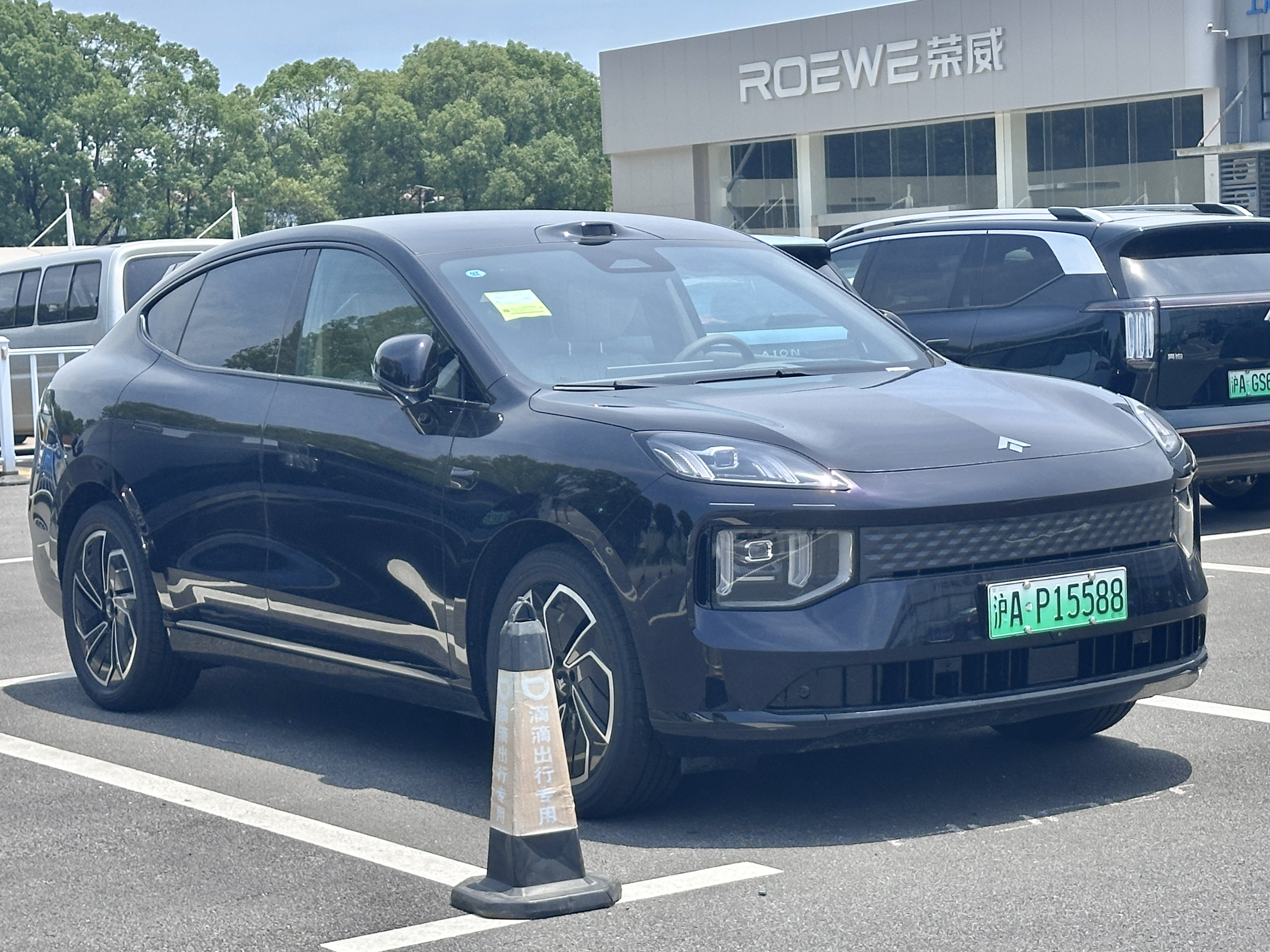
Hyptec S600

=== Concept cars ===
- Hyptec Earth Shooting Brake, Auto Shanghai 2025
