= Hyptec A800 =

Range-extended full-size sedan

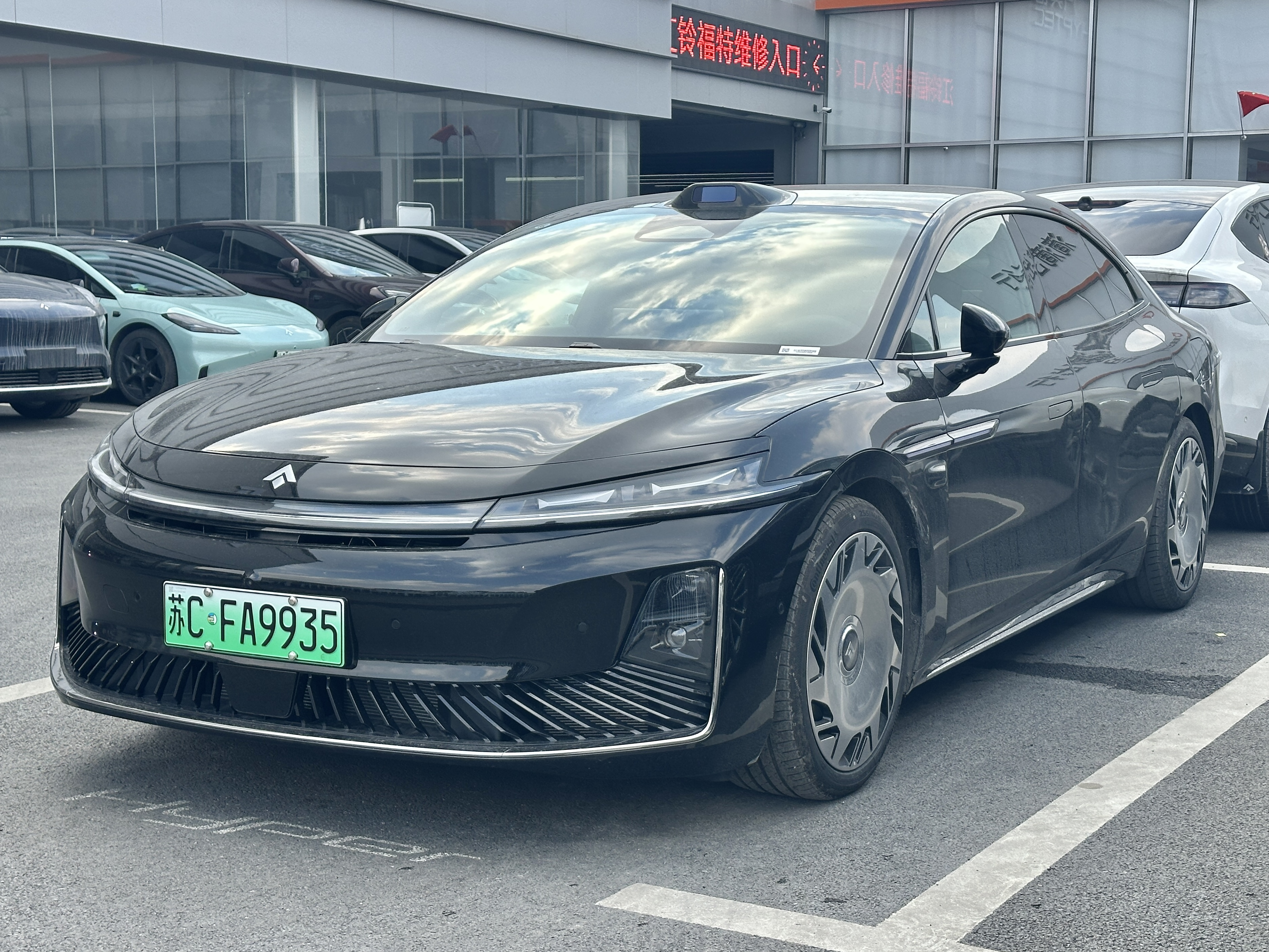

Overview
- Manufacturer: GAC Aion
- Production: 2026–present
- Assembly: China: Guangzhou

Body and chassis
- Class: Full-size car (E)
- Body style: 4-door sedan
- Layout: Front-engine, rear-motor, rear-wheel-drive
- Related: Toyota bZ7

Powertrain
- Engine: Petrol EREV: 1.5 L turbo I4
- Power output: 158 hp (118 kW; 160 PS) (engine); 340 hp (250 kW; 340 PS) (motor)
- Hybrid drivetrain: Series hybrid (EREV)
- Battery: 35.03 kWh LFP
- Range: At least 1,200 km (746 mi)
- Electric range: 178 km (111 mi)

Dimensions
- Wheelbase: 3,020 mm (118.9 in)
- Length: 5,130 mm (202.0 in)
- Width: 1,966 mm (77.4 in)
- Height: 1,500 mm (59.1 in)
- Curb weight: 2,245–2,400 kg (4,949–5,291 lb)

The Hyptec A800 (Chinese: 广汽昊铂A800; pinyin: Guǎngqì Hàobó A800) is a range-extended full-size sedan produced by GAC Aion and sold under the Hyptec brand. The vehicle is the sister model of Toyota bZ7.

== Overview ==
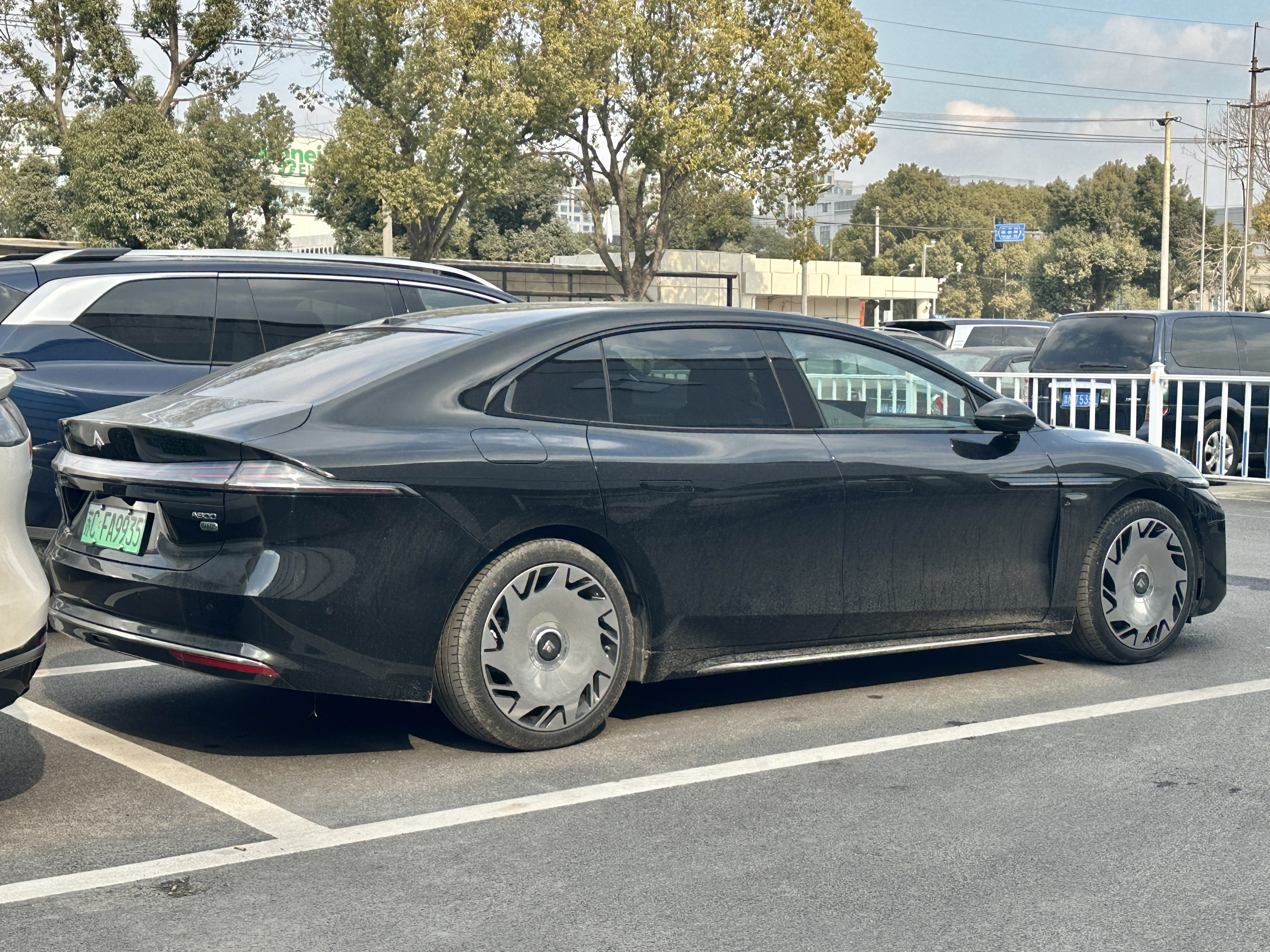
Rear view

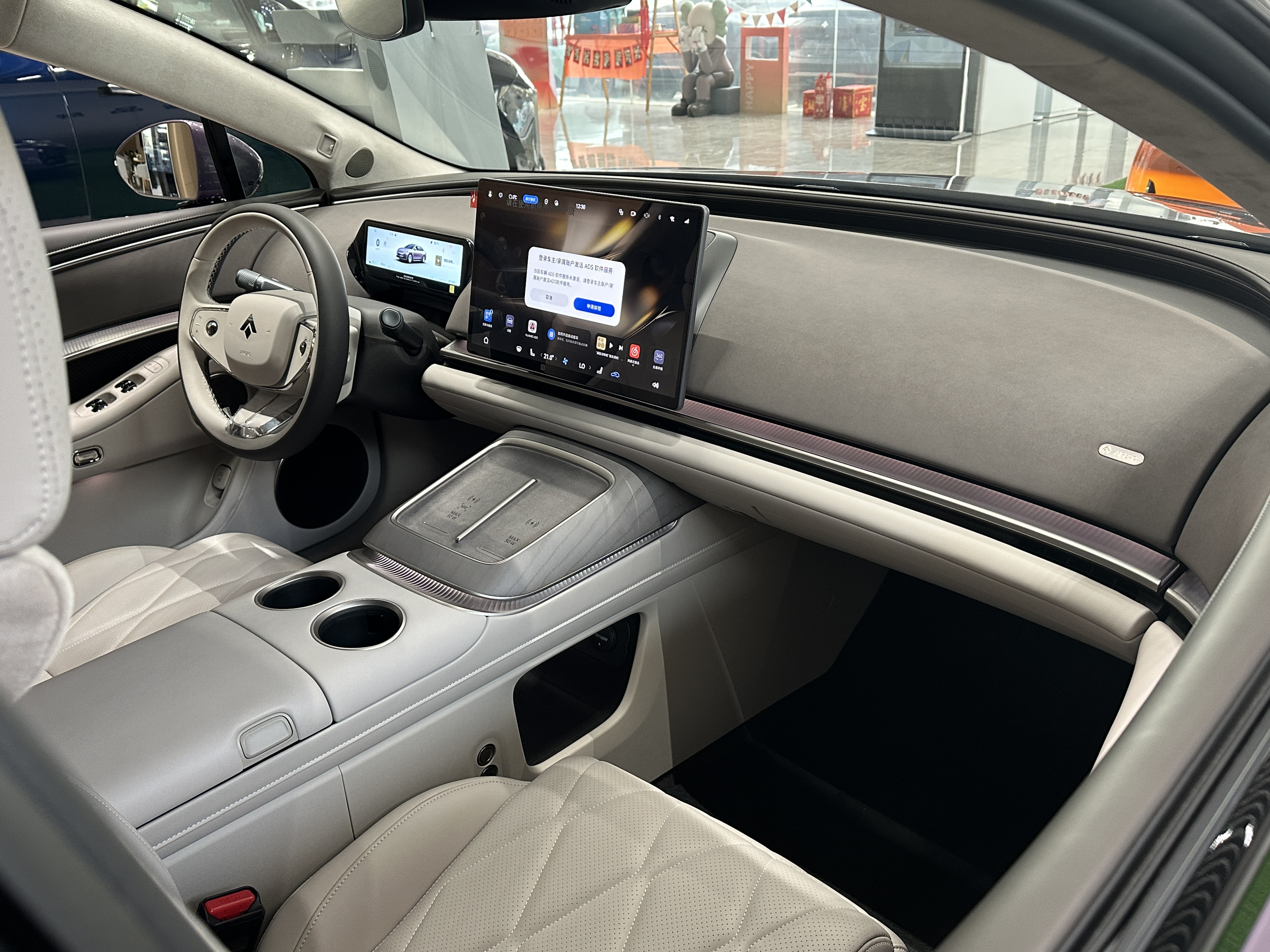
Interior

The Hyptec A800 is positioned as a mid-to-large sedan and uses a range-extender hybrid powertrain. Despite being positioned as a mid-to-large sedan, its dimensions place the A800 into the full-size class. The A800 is classified as a 4-door sedan and has a 5-seater configuration.

It was previewed as the Trumpchi 1 Concept that was first revealed on 25 September 2024 and is also the first model co-developed by GAC and Huawei.

The production version was unveiled at the 2025 Chengdu Auto Show. It will compete with cars like the Stelato S9, Xiaomi SU7, and the Avatr 12. It uses technology developed by Huawei. Pre-sales opened in December 2025. and sales commenced on 4 March 2026.

=== Design ===
The Hyptec A800 uses a fastback sedan roofline. A 6-meter through-type light strip is present on the front end and is claimed to be the longest light strip used on the exterior of a production car. A fastback design is paired with multi-spoke rims and hidden door handles. The taillights utilize 3 full-width light bars and the logo of Huawei's Qiankun ADS system is present below the "A800" badge.

=== Features ===
The interior features a 10.25-inch LCD instrument cluster, a 14.6-inch central touchscreen, and a 27-inch Windshield heads-up display. It is equipped with the HarmonySpace 5 infotainment system that is used by the central touchscreen. The front seats offer 8-way power adjustment, heating, ventilation, and three massage modes. Rear seats offer 4-way power adjustment and heating. The headlights are X-Pixel headlights produced by Huawei. The Qiankun 4 Ultra advanced driver-assistance system, also made by Huawei, is utilized.

== Powertrain ==
The Hyptec A800 uses a 1.5 liter turbocharged inline 4 producing 158 horsepower (118 kW; 160 PS) as a generator. It is paired with a 35.03 kWh lithium iron phosphate battery that gives the A800 a pure electric range of 178 kilometres (111 mi) and a combined range of over 1,200 kilometres (746 mi). It has a fuel consumption figure of 5.74L/100 km, which is roughly 41 MPG. The electric motor in the A800 produces 340 horsepower (250 kW; 340 PS).

== Sales ==
Year	China
2025	192
