= GAC Aion =

Chinese electric vehicle manufacturer

GAC Aion New Energy Automobile Co., Ltd.
- Native name: 广汽埃安新能源汽车股份有限公司
- Formerly: GAC New Energy Automobile Co., Ltd.
- Type: Subsidiary
- Industry: Automotive
- Founded: 28 July 2017; 9 years ago
- Headquarters: Guangzhou, China
- Area served: China; Southeast Asia; Mexico; Qatar
- Key people: Gu Huinan (General Manager); Xu Zhongmin (Deputy General Manager)
- Products: Electric cars
- Production output: ▼374,884 vehicles (2024)
- Brands: Aion; Hyptec
- Parent: GAC Group
- Subsidiaries: Hycan (20.54%); Aion Auto UK
- Website: aion.com.cn

GAC Aion New Energy Automobile Co., Ltd., trading as GAC Aion (Chinese: 广汽埃安; pinyin: Guǎngqì Āiān), is a Chinese electric vehicle manufacturer headquartered in Guangzhou, China. A subsidiary of GAC Group, it was established in 2017 as the GAC New Energy Automobile. Its current name was adopted in November 2020. It produces battery electric vehicles under the eponymous Aion brand and the premium Hyptec brand.

As of 2023, GAC Aion is the third-largest battery electric vehicle brand after Tesla and BYD Auto, both in China and globally by producing 480,003 vehicles.

== History ==
GAC New Energy Automobile Co., Ltd. was established on 28 July 2017 as a subsidiary of GAC Group to develop connected new energy vehicles. Aion was introduced as an electric vehicle sub-brand under GAC New Energy in 2018. The first model, the Aion S, was shown to the public in November at Auto Guangzhou. In 2019, GAC announced 12 new models, which eventually included the LX, V, and Y.

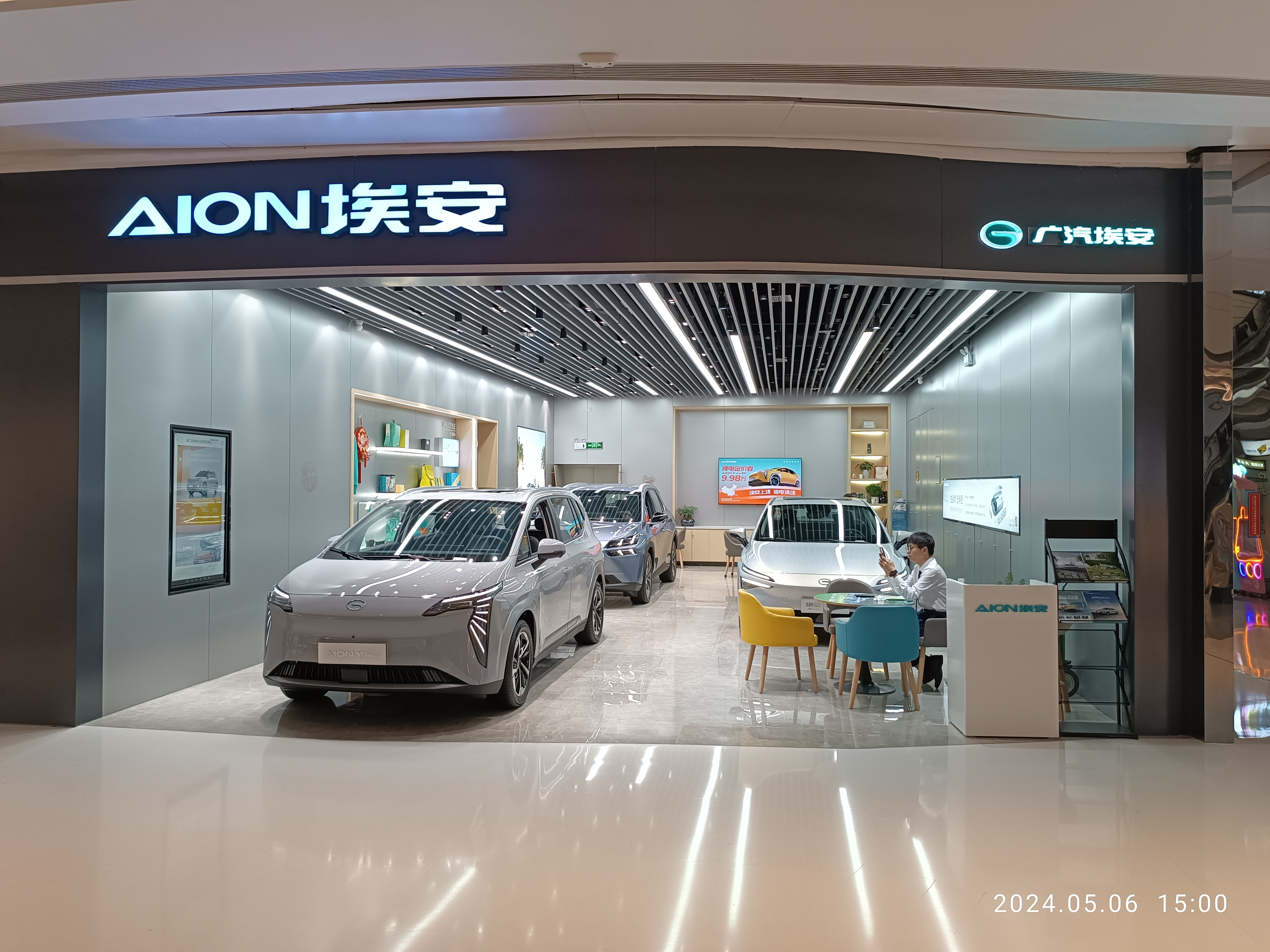
An Aion showroom in a mall in Shenzhen

In November 2020, GAC New Energy was renamed to GAC Aion, and became an independent operation separate from other GAC operations.

In 2021, GAC Aion announced that the Aion V would be equipped with a graphene battery that can charge from 0 to 80% in 8 minutes, adding 70 kWh of charge. In 2021, GAC Aion announced A480 charging station, 480 kW, 1000 V. 35.1kWh (30-80%) charge to the new Aion V 6C in less than 5 minutes and 0-80% charge in 8 minutes. In July 2021, GAC Group announced that GAC Aion will jointly develop a medium-to-large pure electric SUV "AH8" with Huawei.

In September 2022, GAC Aion revealed a new brand logo. The company also introduced a new premium brand called Hyper (Chinese: 昊铂; pinyin: Hàobó) and its first product, the Hyper SSR. In August 2024, GAC Aion renamed the Western name of the brand to Hyptec.

In October 2023, GAC Group announced that it would take over 100% ownership of GAC's Changsha plant, which had been jointly operated with Mitsubishi Motors under GAC Mitsubishi. Starting in May 2024, the plant will have an annual capacity of 200,000 electric vehicles for the Aion brand.

In August 2025, GAC Group announced that its controlling subsidiary, GAC Aion, invested 600 million yuan in Huawang Automotive. Upon completion of the capital increase, GAC Group directly holds 71.43% of the equity in Huawang and indirectly holds 28.57% through GAC Aion.

In December 2025, GAC Group announced to merge Hyptec and Aion into the same business unit for unified operation.

== Overseas markets ==
GAC Aion entered the Thailand market in September 2023 by launching the right-hand drive Aion Y Plus in the country. The company began assembly of electric cars in Thailand in July 2024.

In November 2023, Aion vehicles went on sale in Mexico alongside other GAC Motor vehicles.

In January 2024, company entered the Hong Kong market, and started previewing its product in Malaysia.

In April 2024, GAC Aion announced its entry to Indonesia with local partner Indomobil Group. Indomobil will invest in a local manufacturing plant to assemble Aion vehicles.

In September 2024, GAC Aion entered the Philippine market under Dangdang New Energy Auto Service (Philippines) Ltd. Corp.

In October 2024, GAC Aion entered the Vietnamese market.

On 13 March 2026, the Aion UT was launched in Australia with two variants: Premium and Luxury.

In April 2026 GAC Aion entered the UK market as Aion Auto UK Limited, trading as AION Auto UK launching as a joint venture between GAC Group and Jameel Motors.

In May 2026, GAC Group officially entered the Pakistani market in partnership with Lucky Motor Corporation (LMC) the brand brought in models through CBU completely built units and introduced for electric models known as Aion V, UT and ES and the Hyptec HT

== Products ==
=== Aion ===
Aion (Chinese: 埃安; pinyin: Āiān) is the eponymous mass-market brand of GAC Aion.

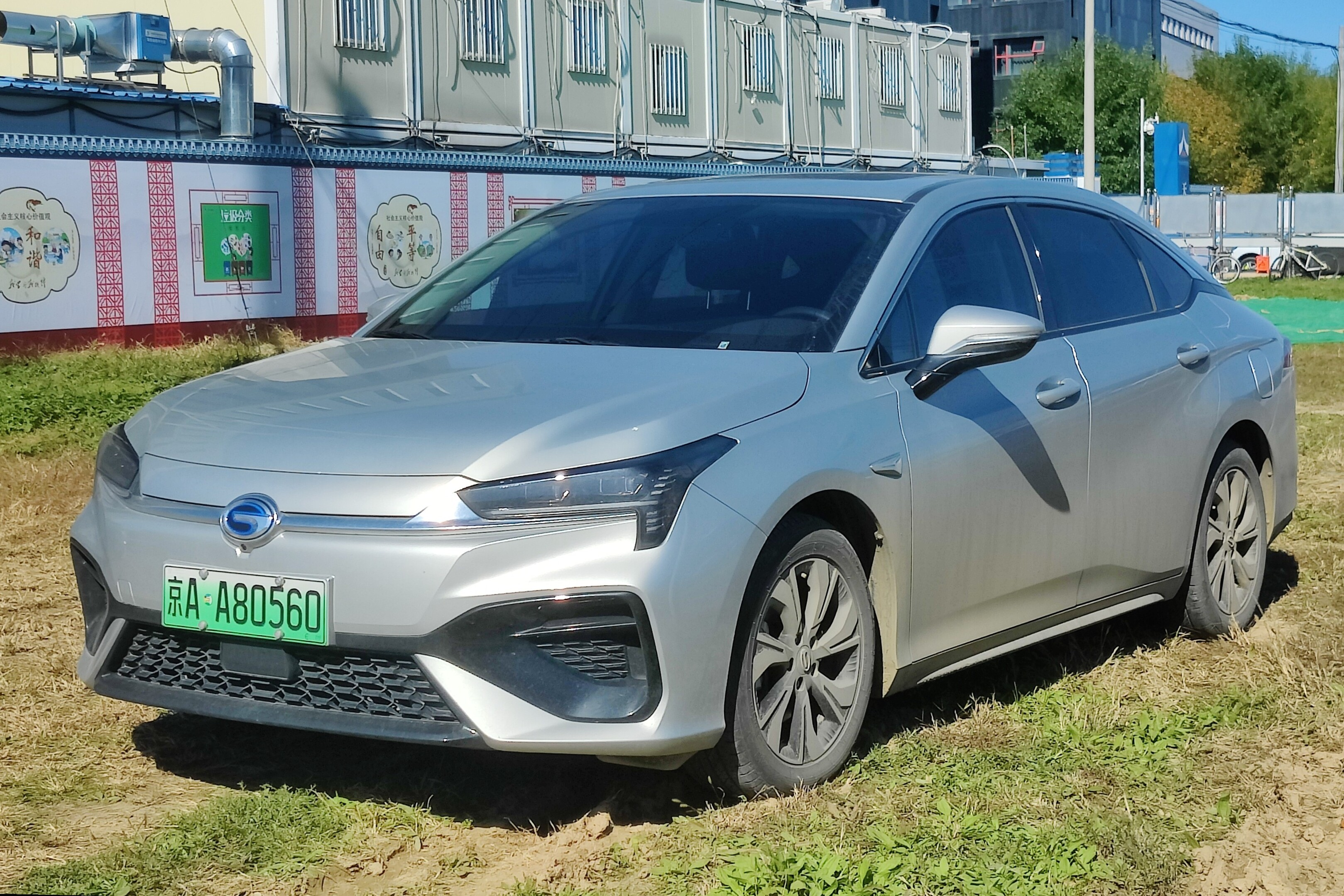
Aion S

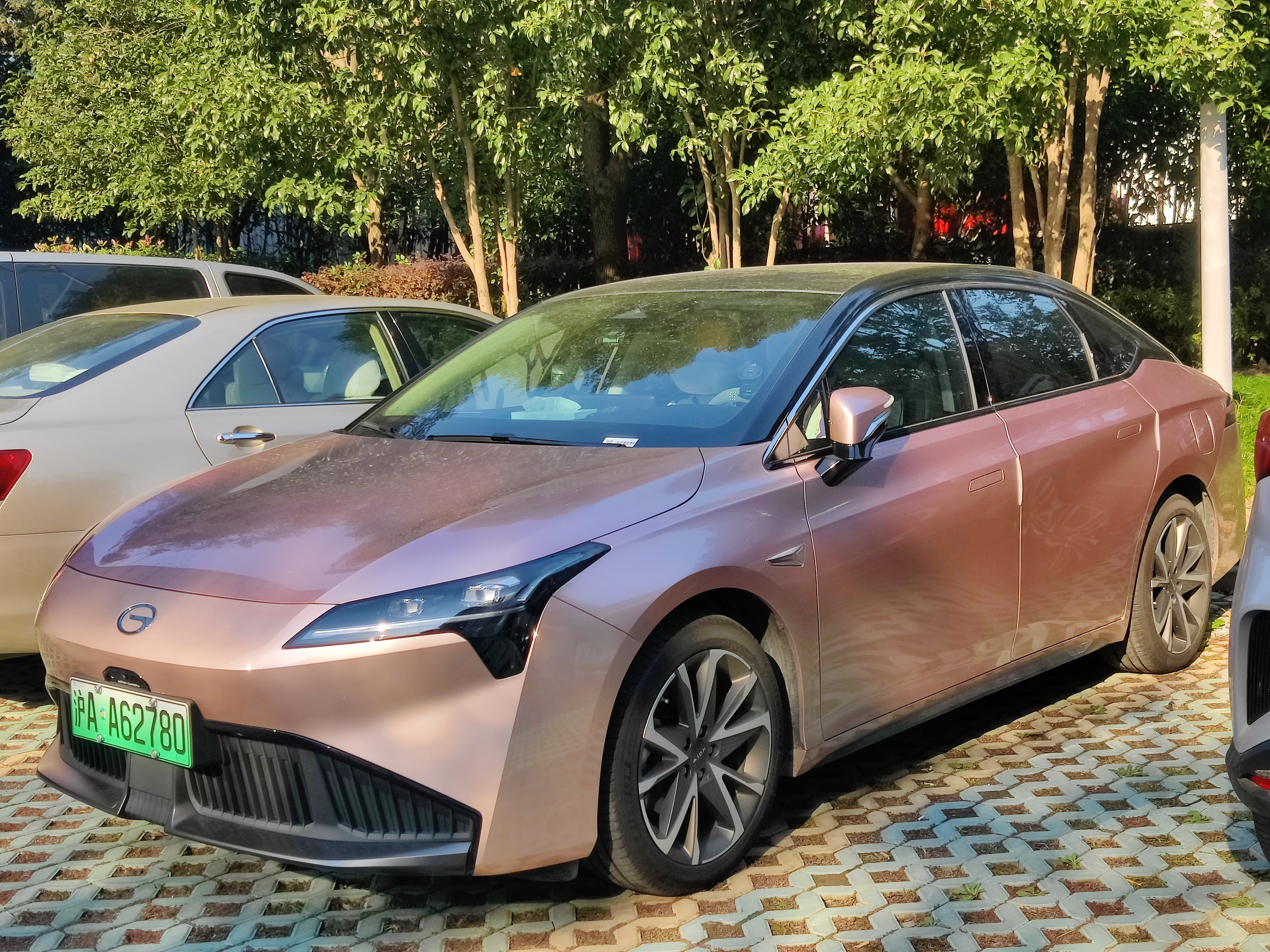
Aion S Plus

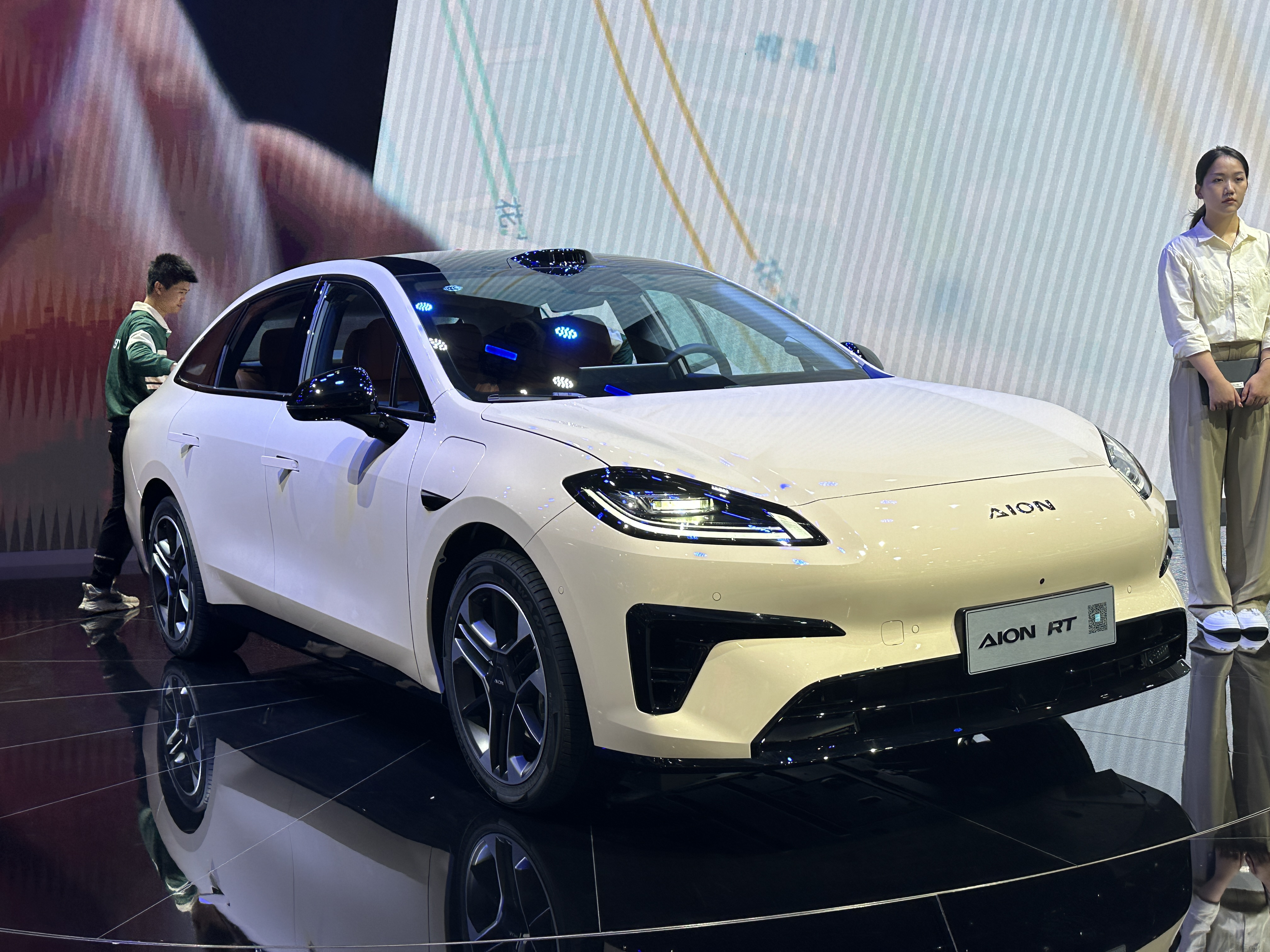
Aion RT

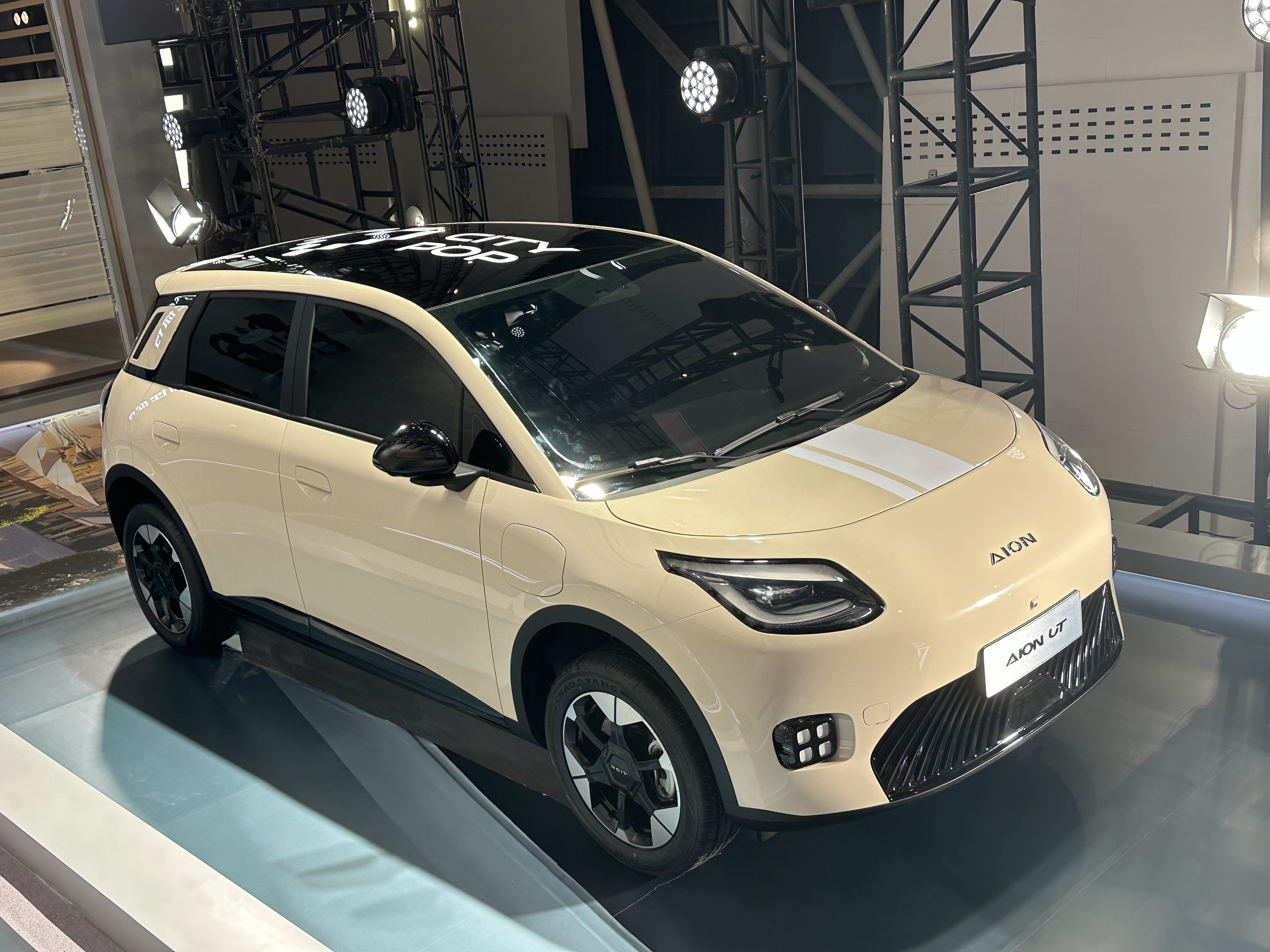
Aion UT

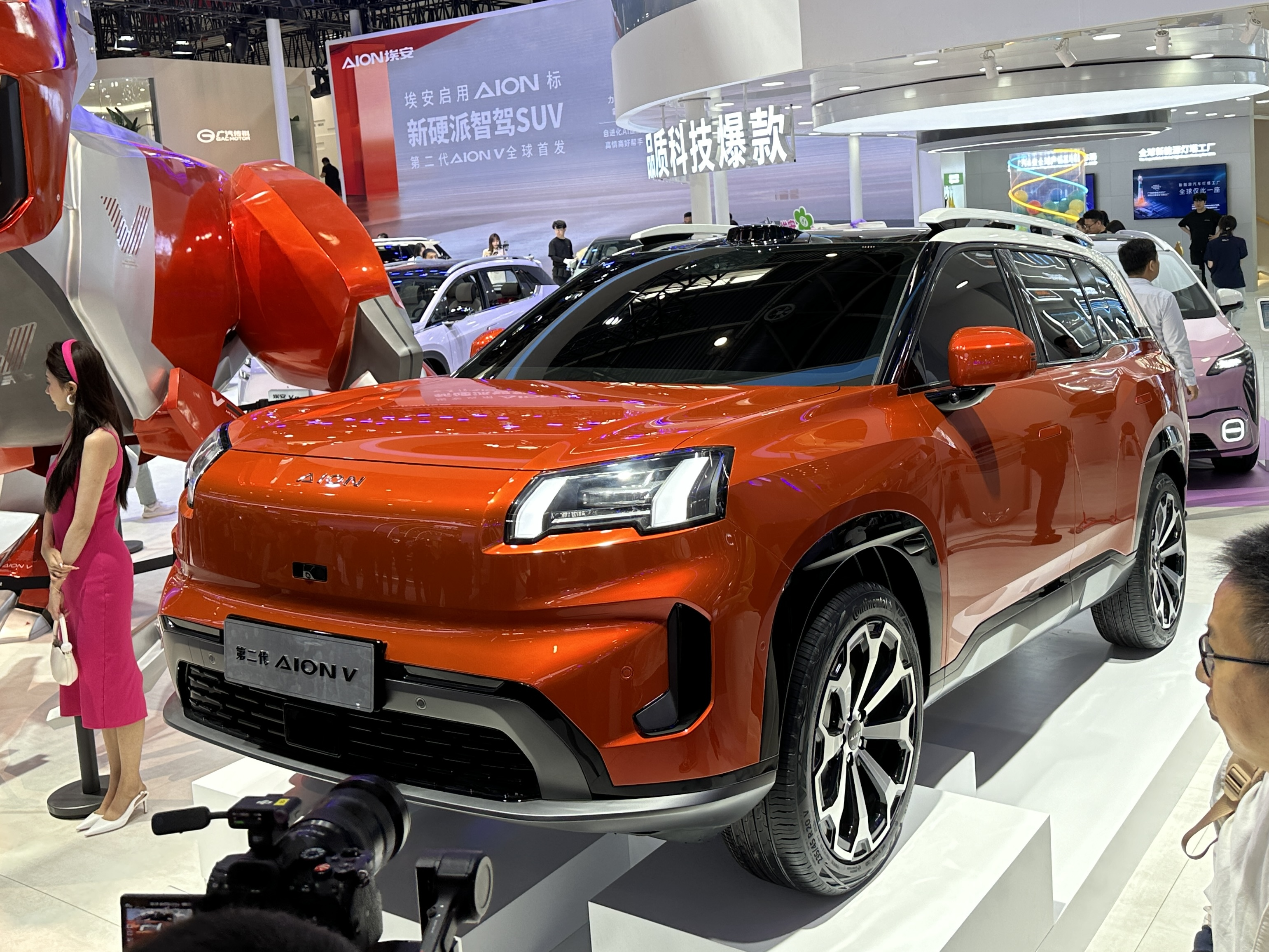
Aion V

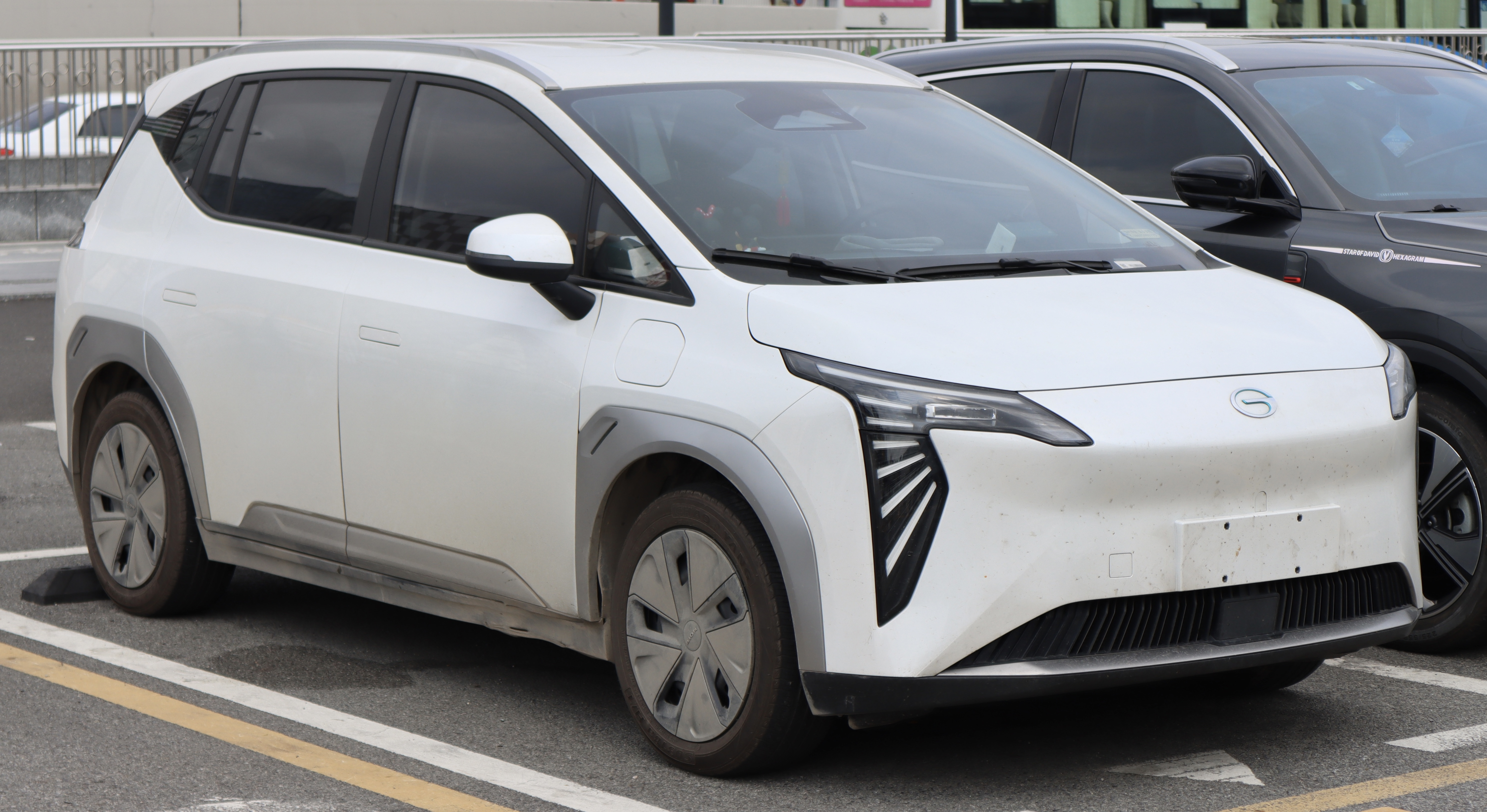
Aion Y Plus

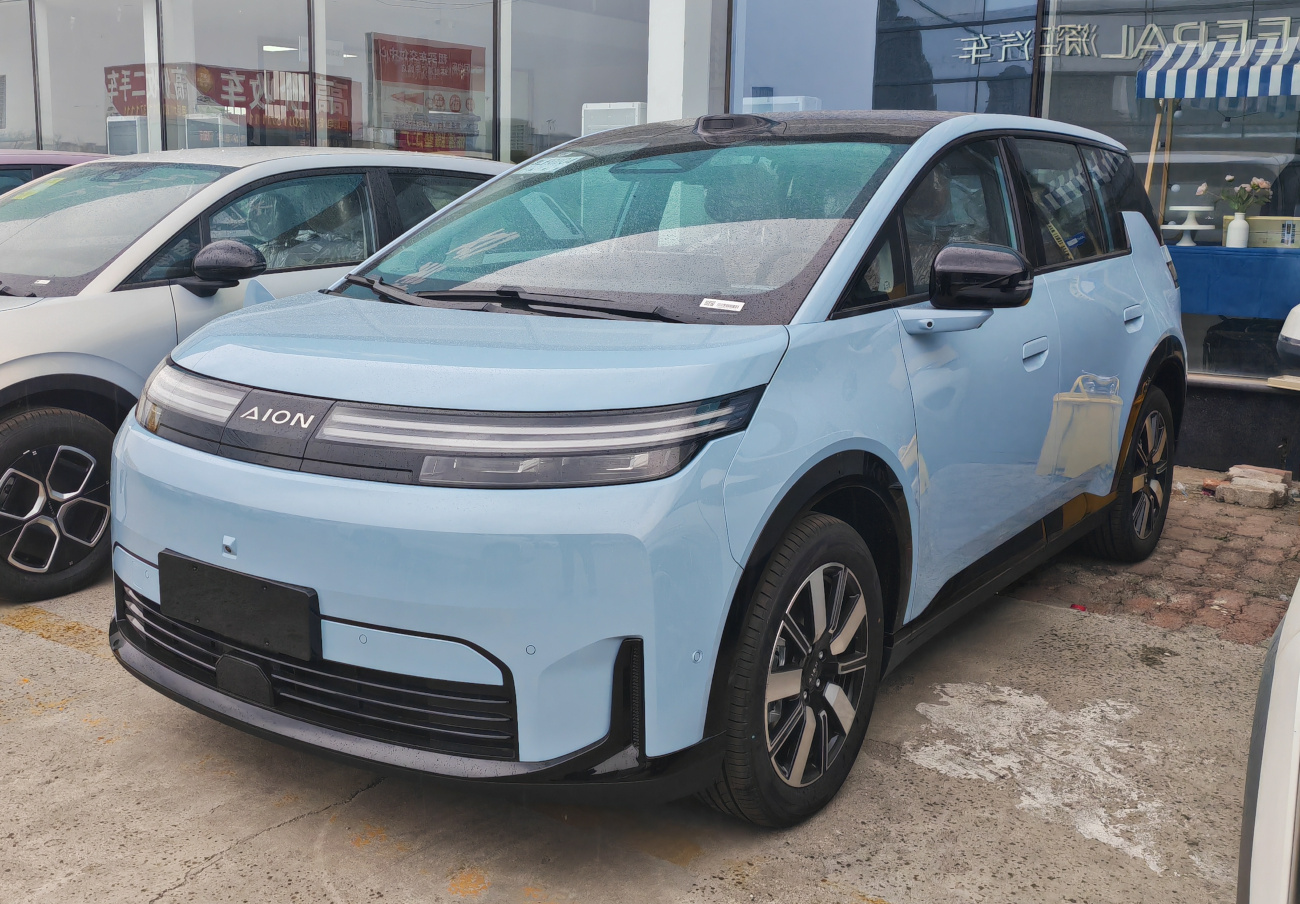
Aion N60

Aion Ray 7

=== Hyptec ===
Hyptec (Chinese: 广汽昊铂; pinyin: Guǎngqì Hàobó) is the premium brand of GAC Aion. The brand was created in September 2022 as Hyper, with a goal to expand GAC Aion's portfolio with a separate premium brand.

Hyptec's first product is the Hyptec SSR sports car. Production of the SSR began in October 2023. In 2023, the Hyper lineup was further expanded with a second model, the Hyptec GT sedan, which went on sale in July 2023. In October of the same year, the mid-size SUV coupe Hyptec HT debuted, with sales beginning in the domestic market in November 2023. In August 2024, the brand's English name was changed from Hyper to Hyptec.

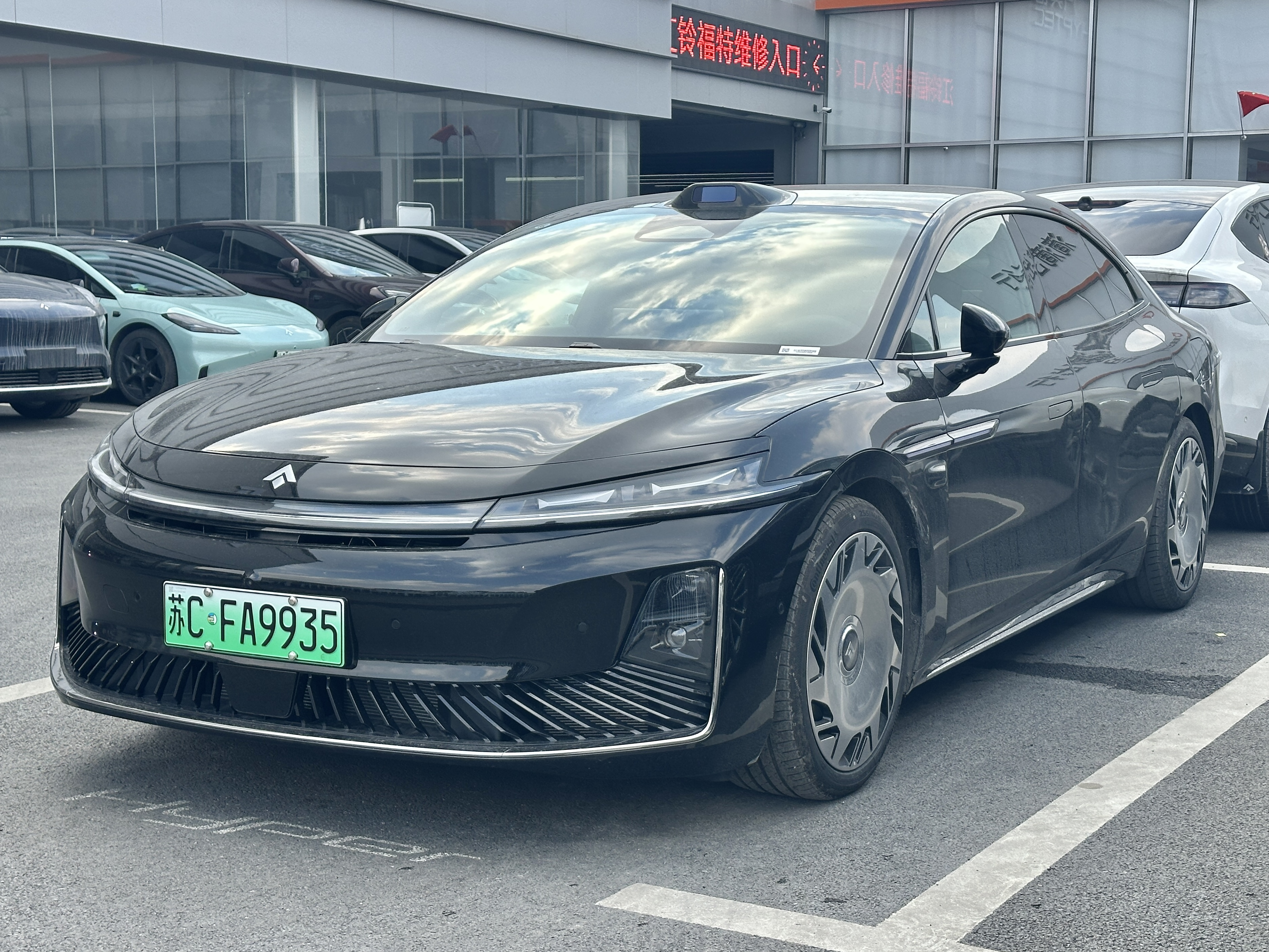
Hyptec A800

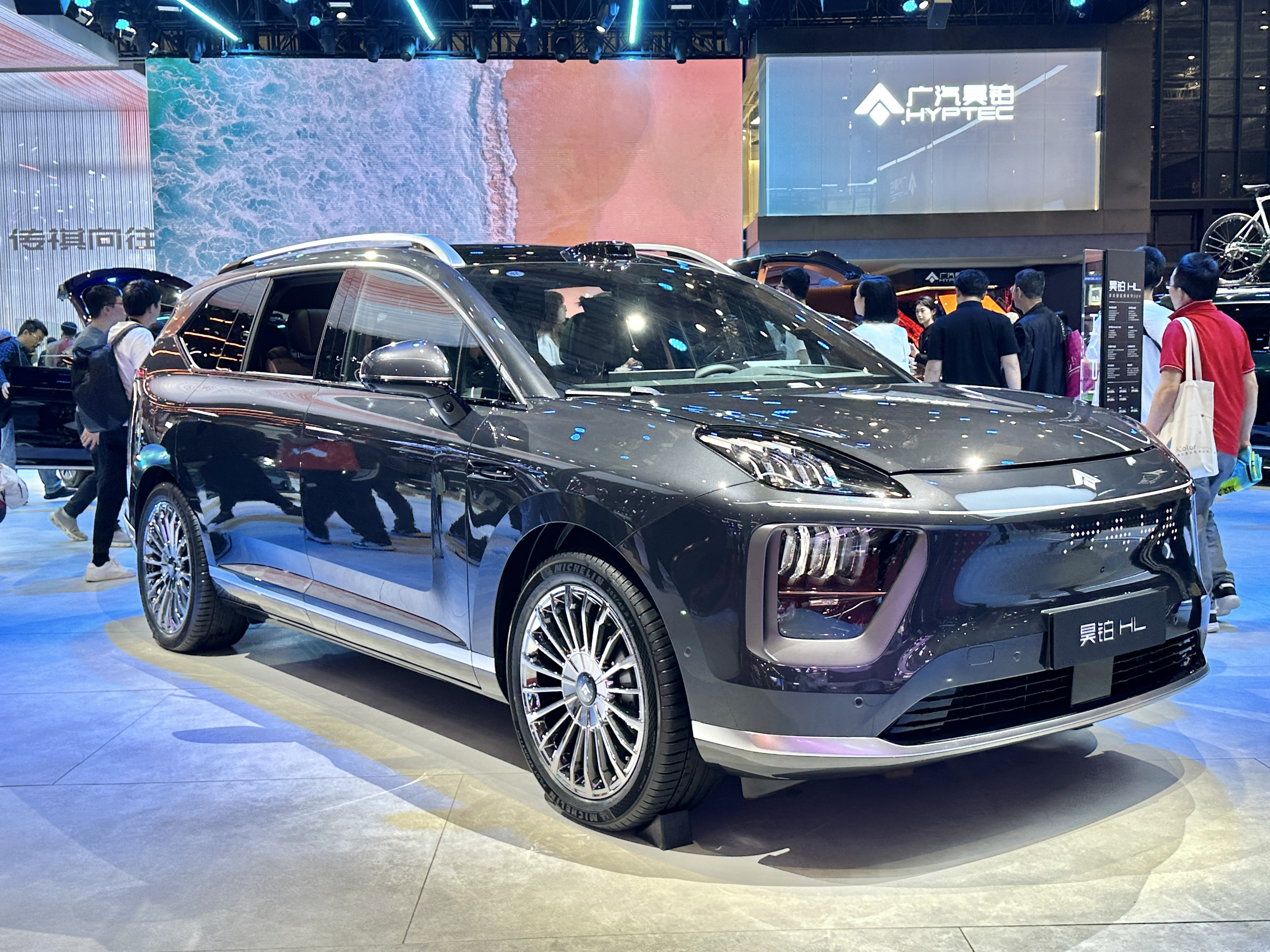
Hyptec HL

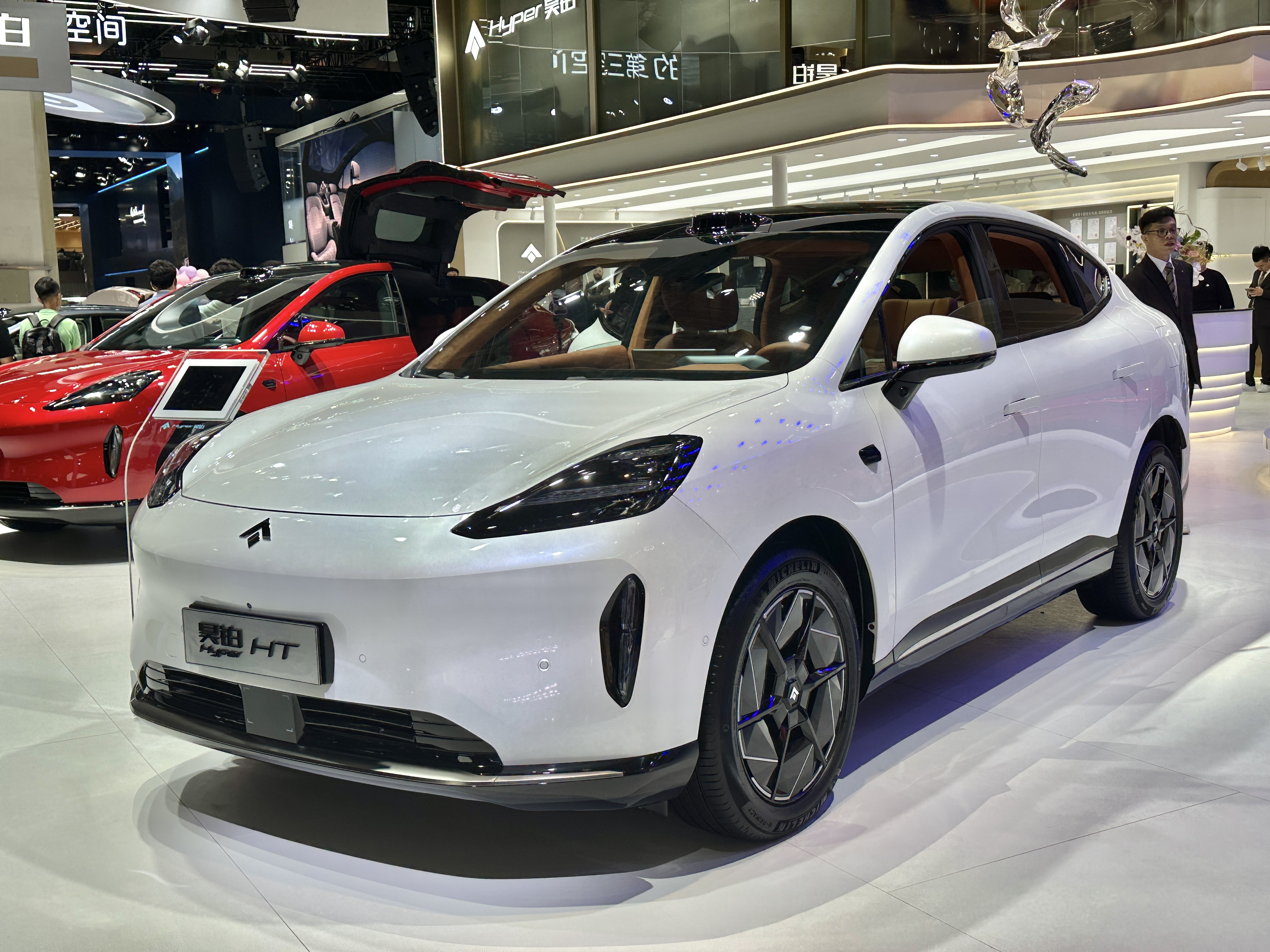
Hyptec HT

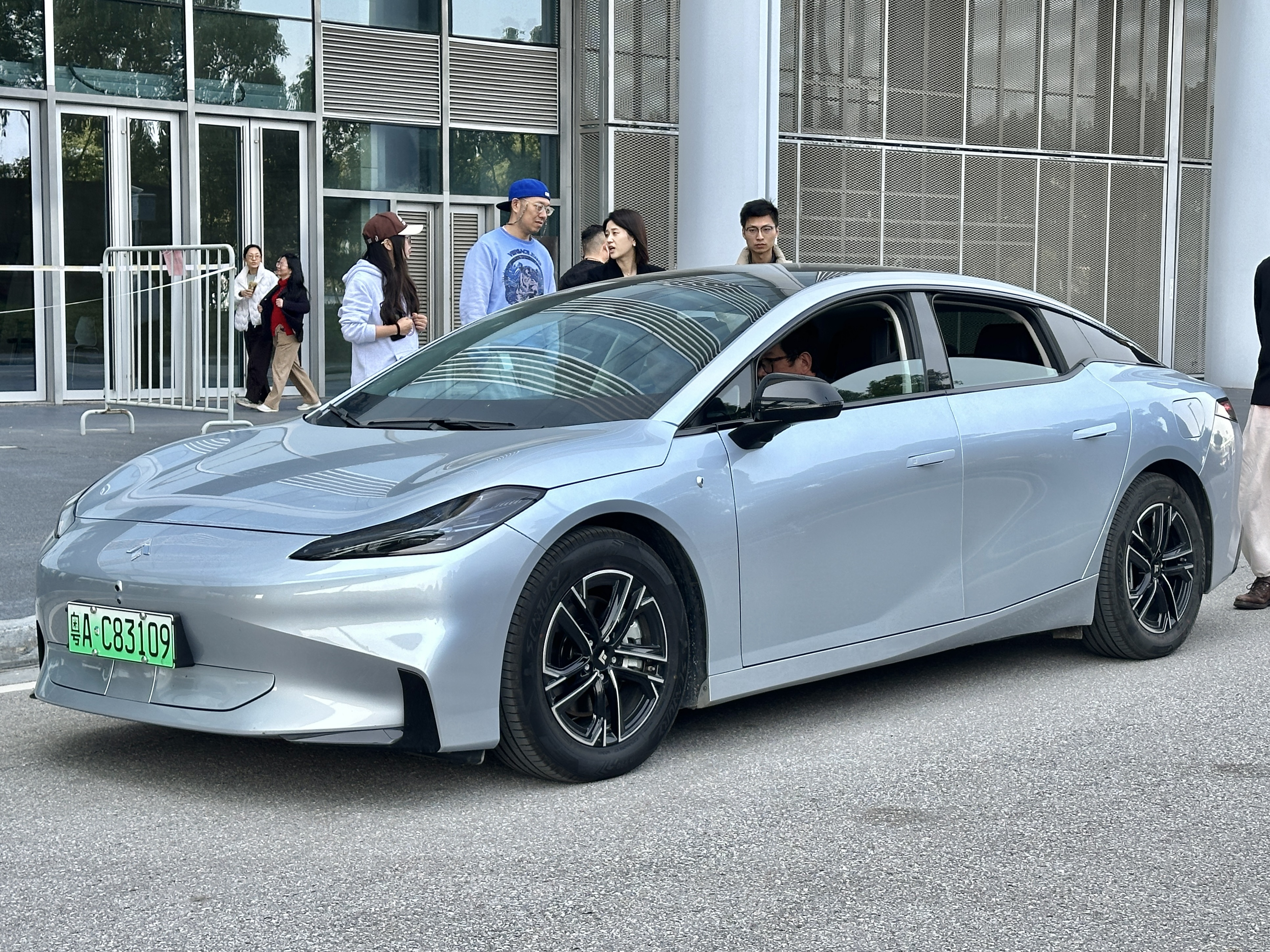
Hyptec GT

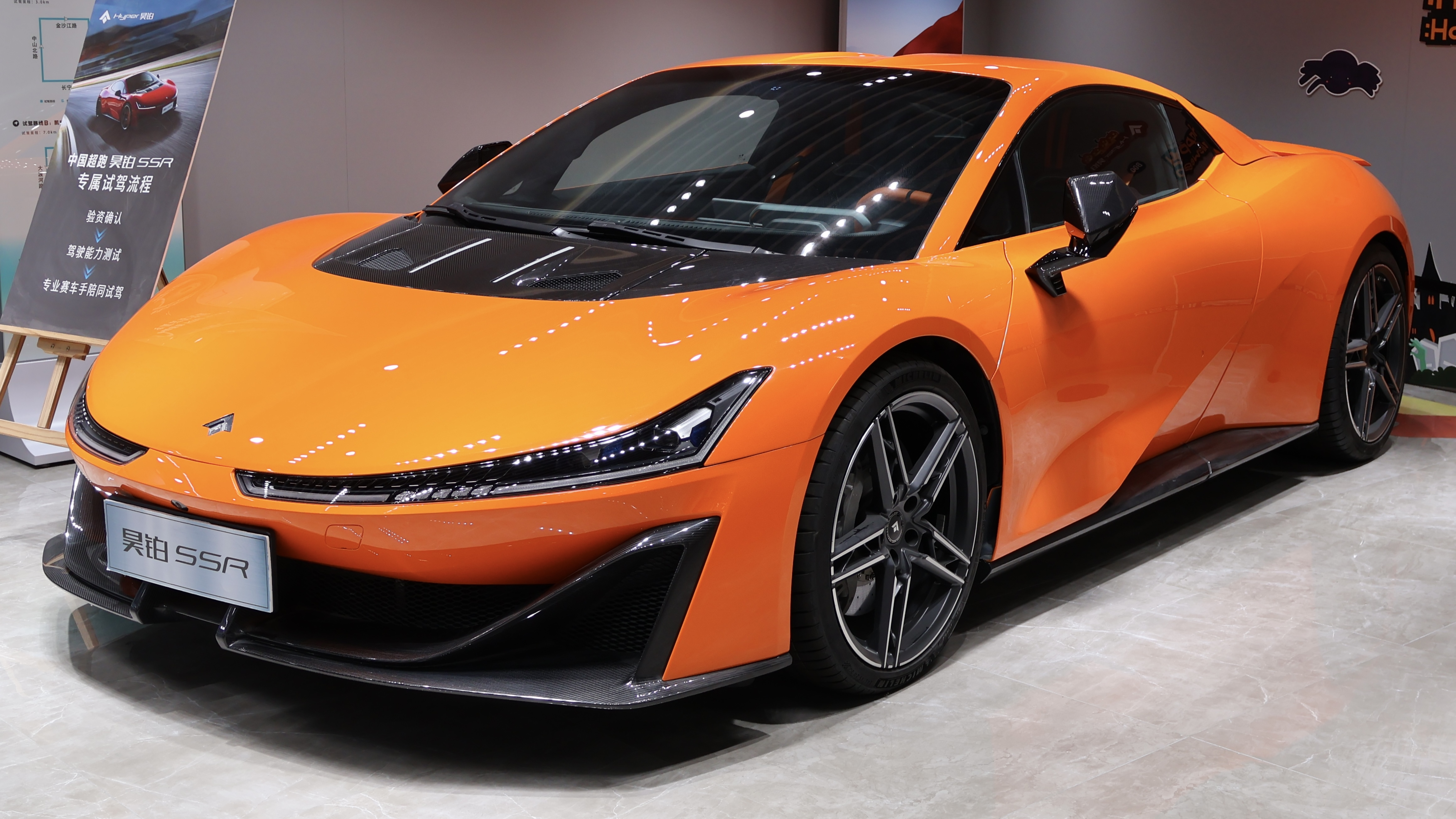
Hyptec SSR

== Joint venture ==
=== Hycan ===
Hycan (Chinese: 合创; pinyin: Héchuàng; lit. 'co-creation') is a joint venture brand of electric vehicles that originated from a partnership in 2019 between GAC and Nio, known as GAC-Nio. The partnership initially produced two models, the Hycan 007 and Hycan Z03, both derived from existing Aion vehicles—the Aion LX and Aion Y, respectively. In 2021, the joint venture rebranded itself as Hycan. GAC Aion holds a 20.54% stake, while the major shareholder is Pearl River Investment (68.56%).

On January 11, 2025, GAC Group disclosed that as the shareholder, it is solving the employee placement issue of Hycan in accordance with its investment ratio. GAC Aion will take over the after-sales service of Hycan products. Hycan has been confirmed as substantially defunct.

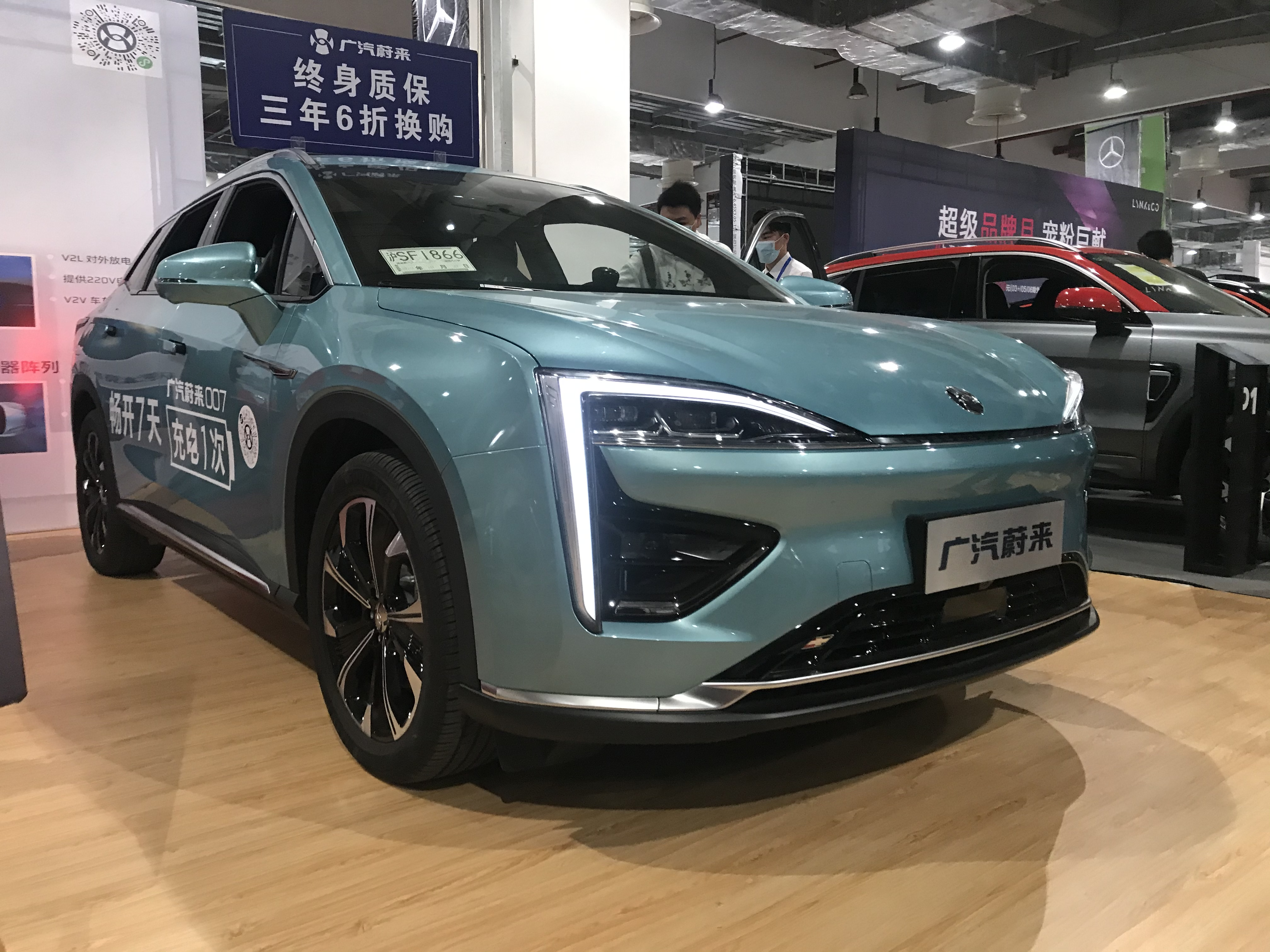
Hycan 007

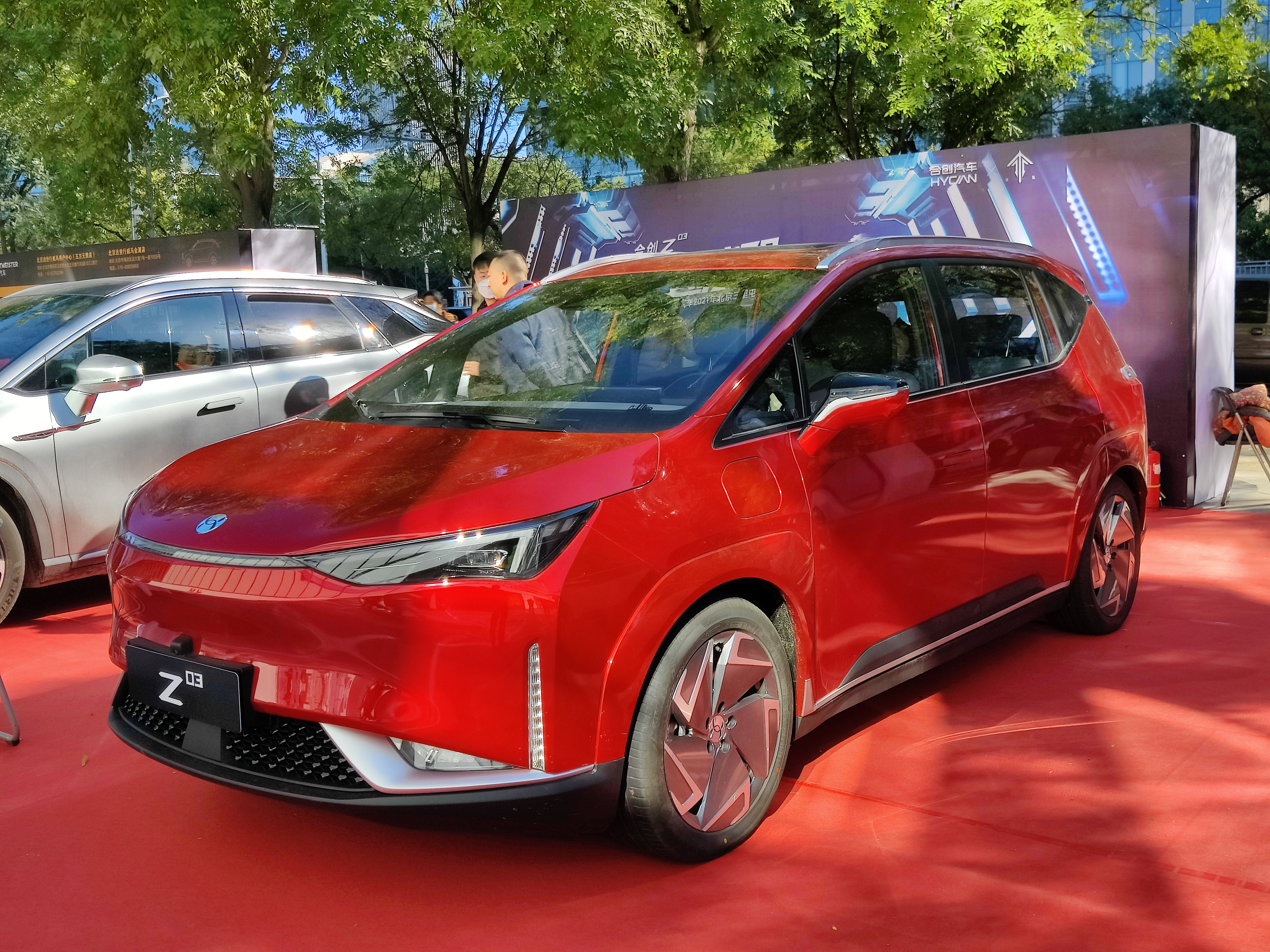
Hycan Z03

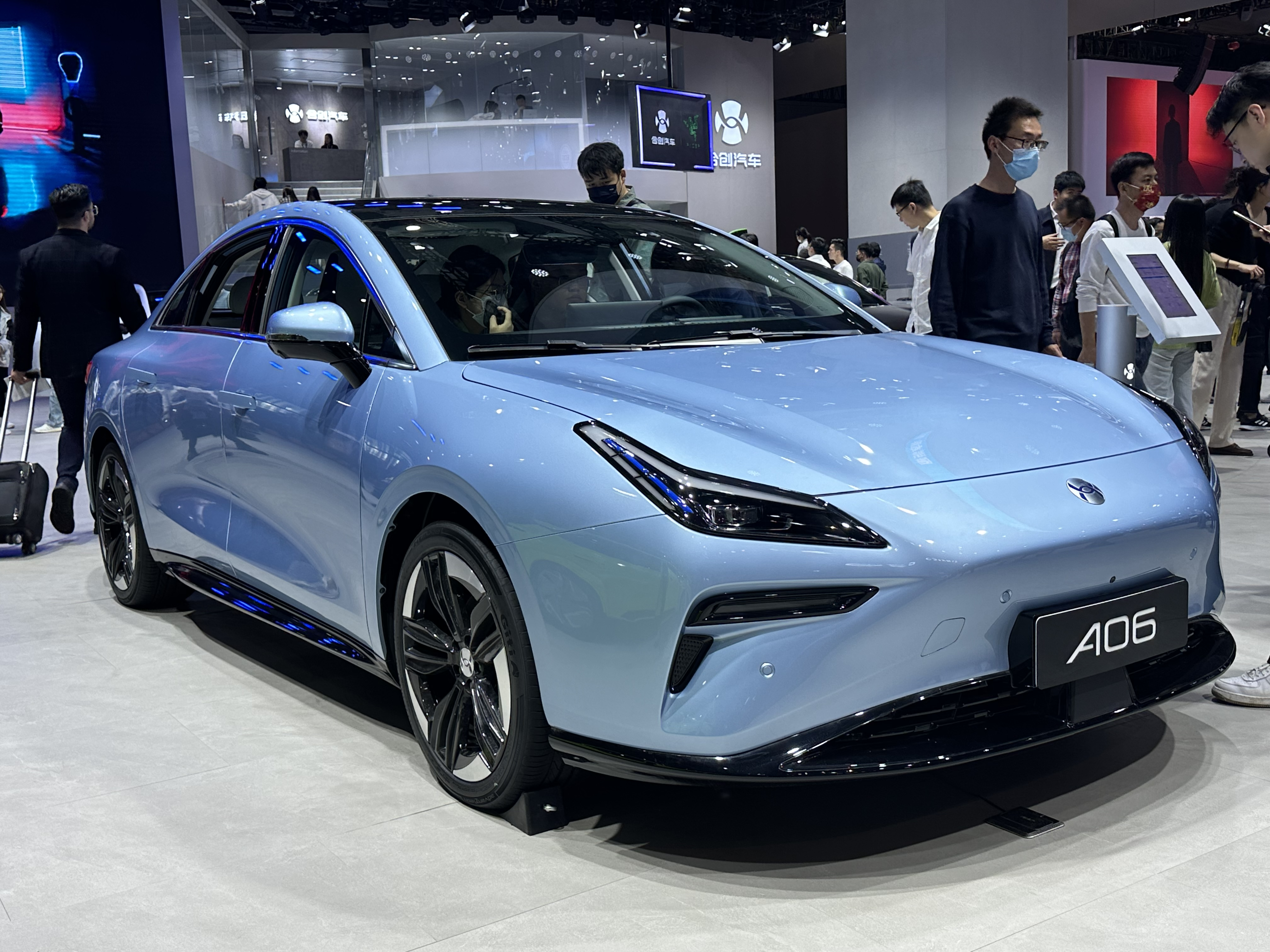
Hycan A06

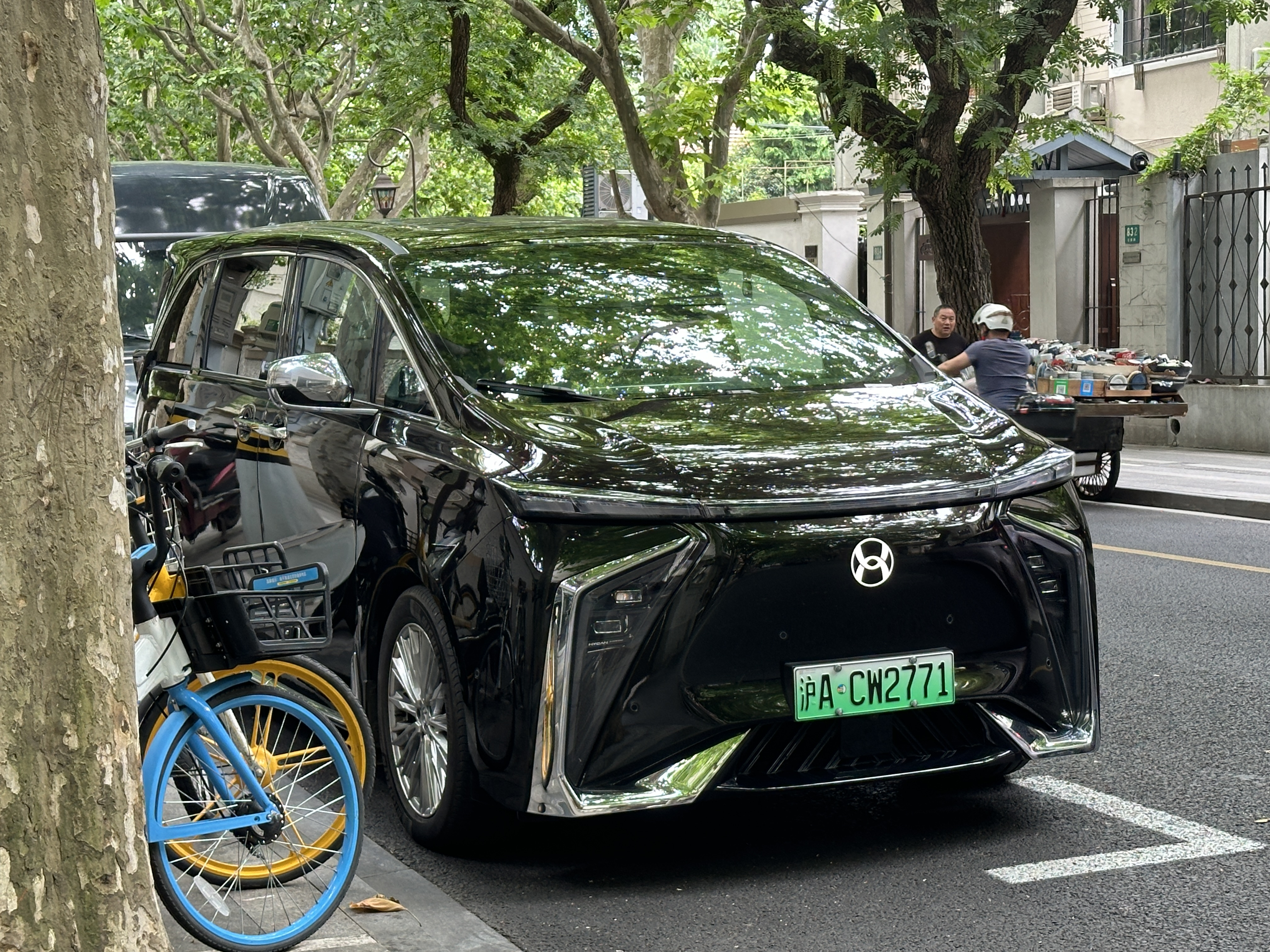
Hycan V09

== Sales ==
| Year | Global |
|---|---|
| 2019 | 33,467 |
| 2020 | 59,595 |
| 2021 | 118,159 |
| 2022 | 271,161 |
| 2023 | 480,003 |
| 2024 | 374,884 |
| 2025 | 290,081 |

== See also ==
- Automobile manufacturers and brands of China
- List of automobile manufacturers of China
- GAC Group
- GAC Motor
