= Aion Auto UK =

British electric vehicle distributor

- Type: Private
- Industry: Automotive
- Founded: October 17, 2025; 11 months ago
- Headquarters: Slough, Berkshire
- Area served: United Kingdom
- Key people: Jon Wakefield (MD)
- Products: Electric cars
- Website: aionauto.co.uk

Aion Auto UK Limited, trading as AION Auto UK, is a British electric vehicle distributor headquartered in Slough, Berkshire. A subsidiary of GAC Aion, it was incorporated in October 2025 ahead of a public launch in April 2026.

== History ==
Aion Auto UK was founded in October 2025 as a joint venture between GAC Group, a Chinese state-owned automobile manufacturer headquartered in Guangzhou, Guangdong, and Jameel Motors, an international automotive distributor.

The joint venture agreement was signed to allow GAC to distribute EVs for a UK market, as part of the organisation’s internationalisation strategy. Other regions that form part of the same strategy include Portugal, Poland and Brazil.

In November 2025, former Honda, Lotus and Inchcape leader Duncan Johnston was recruited as network development director for AION Auto UK, reporting to managing director Jon Wakefield. Following a UK trade debut at Automotive Management Live on 12th November 2025, Aion Auto UK was publicly launched in April 2026 with the introduction of the Aion V, Aion's first car model for sale in the UK.

=== Partnerships ===
CA Auto Finance is the financial services partner for Aion Auto UK. The collaboration covers both retail and wholesale financing.

The brand has also partnered with Jumptech to provide customer service support for home charging, and partnered with the AA to provide roadside assistance for Aion cars.

== Corporate leadership ==
- Managing Director: Jon Wakefield
- Marketing Director: Alex Key
- Network Development Director: Duncan Johnston
- Sales Director: David Pay
- Aftersales Director: Ben Hurford
- Head of Fleet: Lee Giddings

== Products ==
=== Aion V ===
- Aion V

=== Aion UT ===
- Aion UT

== See also ==
- GAC Group, Aion Auto UK’s Chinese parent company
- GAC Aion, GAC Group’s electric vehicle subsidiary in China
- List of automobile manufacturers of China
- Electric cars
