= Hyptec SSR =

Battery electric sports car

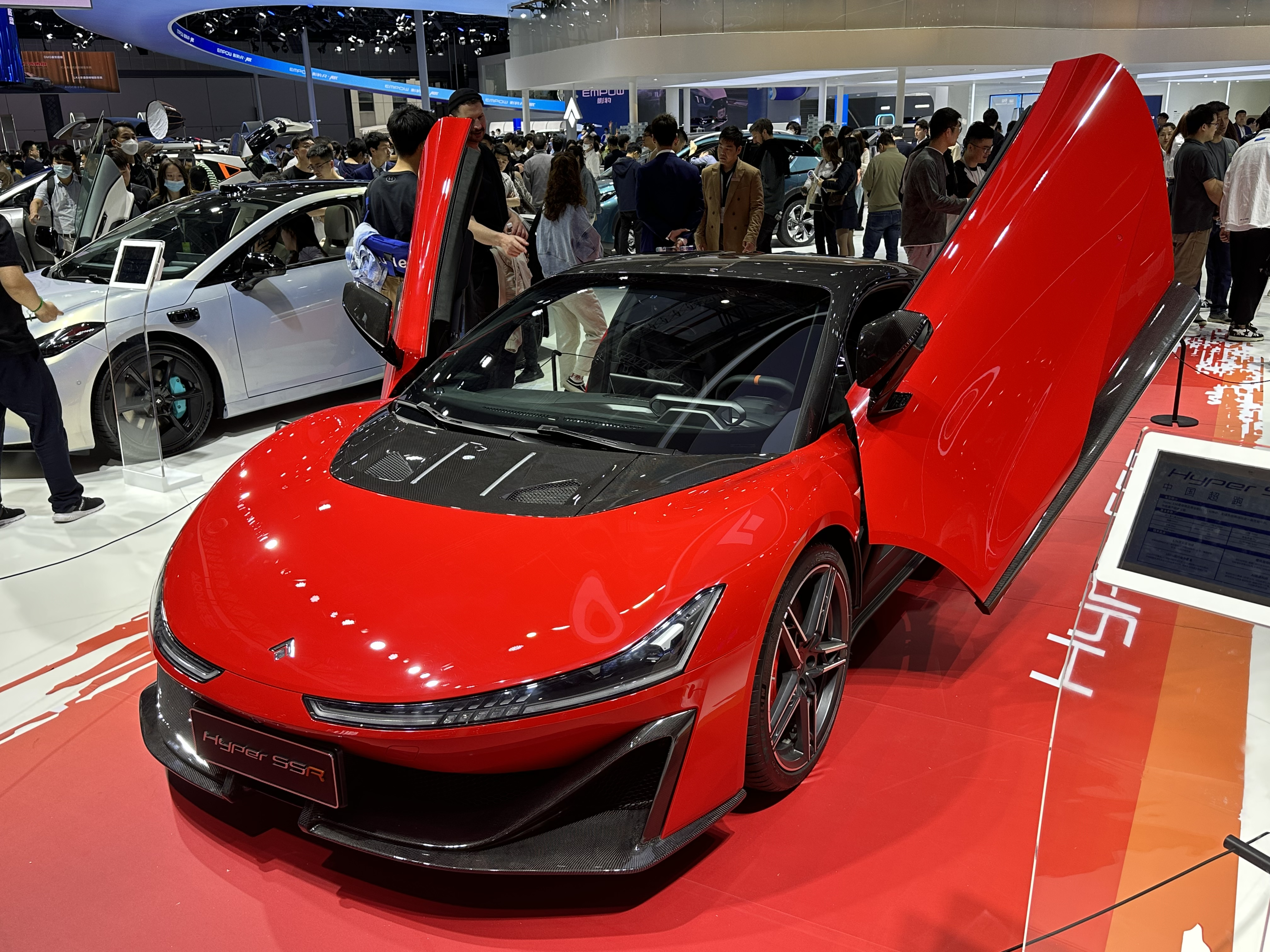

Overview
- Manufacturer: GAC Aion
- Also called: Hyper SSR (2023–2024)
- Production: 2023–present
- Assembly: China: Guangzhou
- Designer: Pontus Fontaeus (exterior); Don Kabongo (interior)

Body and chassis
- Class: Sports car (S)
- Body style: 2-door coupé
- Platform: AEP 3.0
- Doors: Scissor doors

Powertrain
- Power output: 900 kW (1,224 PS; 1,207 hp)
- Hybrid drivetrain: Mid-motor, four-wheel-drive (Hyptec SSR Sprint Speed/Hyptec SSR Ultimate Track)
- Battery: 74.69 kWh li-ion battery
- Electric range: 506 km (314 mi) (CLTC)

Dimensions
- Wheelbase: 2,650 mm (104.3 in)
- Length: 4,556 mm (179.4 in)
- Width: 1,988 mm (78.3 in)
- Height: 1,230 mm (48.4 in)

The Hyptec SSR (Chinese: 广汽昊铂SSR; pinyin: Guǎngqì Hàobó SSR) or previously Hyper SSR is an electric sports car produced by Chinese automobile manufacturer GAC Aion and sold under the Hyptec premium EV brand beginning in 2023. The Hyptec SSR will be the first production 2-door supercar by GAC.

In August 2024, GAC Aion announced to rename the Hyper brand's English name to Hyptec.

== Overview ==
Rear view

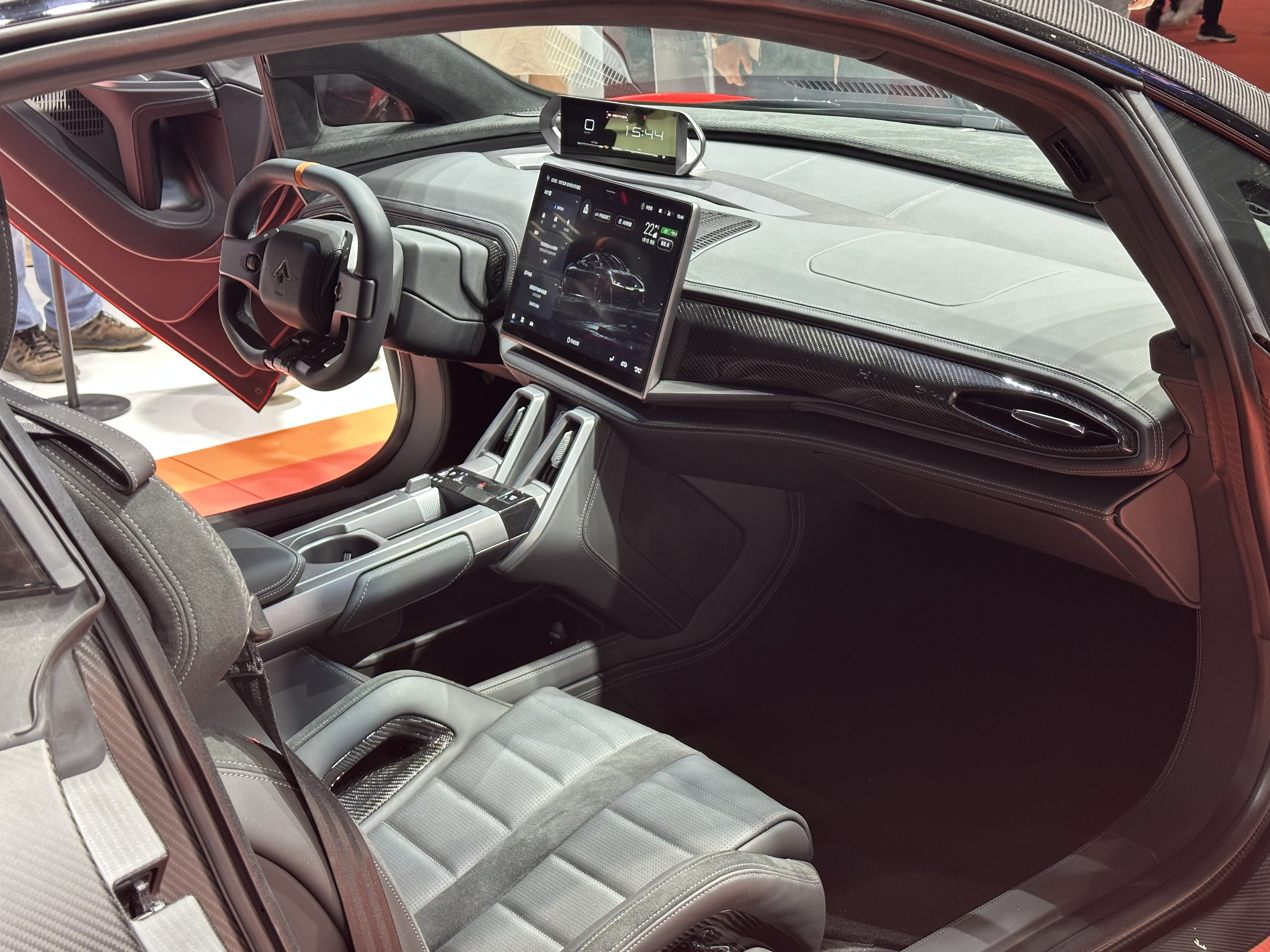
Interior

The Hyptec SSR was first previewed by the GAC Enpulse electric roadster concept, revealed at Auto China in Beijing in September 2020.

On 14 September 2022, GAC revealed on Weibo that a new sports car and Aion brand logo would be revealed the following day at an event called GAC Aion Brand Day. On the 15th, the Hyptec SSR was revealed wearing the Aion brand's new logo.

The Hyptec SSR will have starting price of RMB 1.3 million (~US$186,000) while the Hyptec SSR Ultimate model will start at RMB 1.7 million (US$244,000). Production and deliveries of the car began in October 2023. As of March 2023, the production line is started, and some units of Hyptec SSR were made. In December 2023, GAC Aion launched the Hyptec SSR in Thailand as Chinese-built left-hand drive version only. However, the first SSR delivery in Thailand took place on December 9, 2024. It is also the first official SSR delivery outside China.

== Specifications ==
The Hyptec SSR Ultimate Track model has a 0–100 km/h (0–62 mph) time of 1.9 seconds while standard Hyptec SSR has a 0–100 km/h (0–62 mph) time of 2.3 seconds. The Hyptec SSR Ultimate has a mid-motor, four-wheel-drive layout.

Specs
Model	Years	Power	Toeque	Layout	0–100 km/h (0–62 mph) (Official)
Hyptec SSR	2023–present	900 kW (1,224 PS; 1,207 hp)	1,230 N⋅m (907 lb⋅ft; 125 kg⋅m)	RWD	2.3 s
Hyptec SSR Sprint Speed; Hyptec SSR Ultimate Track	2023–present	900 kW (1,224 PS; 1,207 hp)	1,230 N⋅m (907 lb⋅ft; 125 kg⋅m)	AWD	1.9 s

=== Design ===
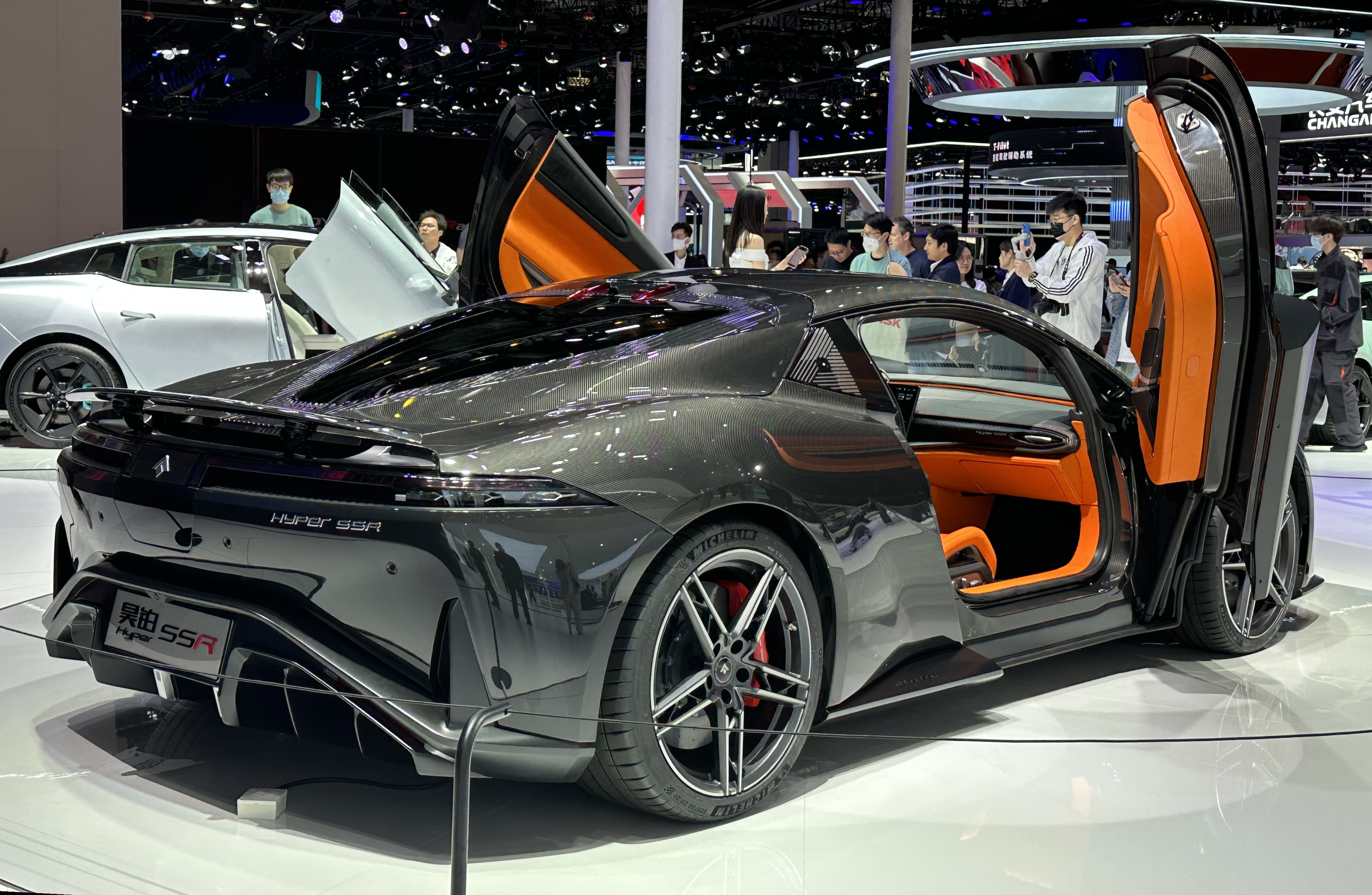
The Hyptec SSR with the doors open.

The Hyptec SSR retains many design cues of the 2020 GAC Enpulse concept car, such as its scissor doors and a similar side profile. However, unlike the Enpulse, the Hyptec SSR does not have a convertible roof.

== Sales and production ==
Year	Sales		Total production
Year	China	Thailand	Total production
2023	10		15
2024	24	1 (Note: Figures based on registration (Thailand))	28
2025	5	2 (Note: Figures based on registration (Thailand))	6
