= V (disambiguation) =

V, or v, is the twenty-second letter of the English alphabet.

V also commonly refers to:

- V, Roman numeral for 5

V may also refer to:

== People ==
- v., abbreviation of von in German surnames
- V. Balakumaran (Tamil activist), a top leader of the Eelam Revolutionary Organisation of Students (EROS) in Sri Lanka
- V, the playwright and activist formerly known as Eve Ensler
- V (singer) (Kim Tae-hyung, born 1995), South Korean vocalist of BTS
- V (Vlad Radovanov, born c. 1971), American rapper in duo V & Legacy

== Arts, entertainment and media ==
=== Fictional characters ===
- V (Devil May Cry)
- V (character), the protagonist of the comic book and film V for Vendetta
- V, the narrator of Vladimir Nabokov's novel The Real Life of Sebastian Knight
- V (Cyberpunk 2077), the protagonist of the video game Cyberpunk 2077
- Serial Designation "V", one of the main characters in the webseries Murder Drones (2021–2024)

=== Television and gaming ===
- V (franchise), a science fiction franchise
  - V (1983 miniseries)
    - V (2009 TV series), a remake
  - V: The Final Battle, 1984
  - V (1984 TV series)
    - V (video game)
- V (TV network), now Noovo, in Québec, Canada
- V (Australian TV channel), or [V]
- Channel [V], in Asia
- The V logo for the Venezuelan television channel Venevisión

=== Films ===
- V (2020 film), an Indian Telugu action thriller
- V (2021 film), an Indian Tamil horror drama
- V for Vendetta (film), 2005

=== Literature ===
- "V" (poem), by Tony Harrison, 1985
- V (American magazine), launched in 1999
- V (Finnish magazine), 2006–2007
- V., a 1963 novel by Thomas Pynchon
- V: The Second Generation, a 2008 novel based TV series
- V, the Vespasian manuscript of the Anglian collection
- "V" Is for Vengeance, a novel

=== Music ===
==== Albums ====
- V (Aṣa album) (2022)
- V (Fate album) (2006)
- V (Havok album) (2020)
- V (Hiroyuki Sawano album), 2023
- V (jj album) (2014)
- V (Karma to Burn album) (2011)
- V (Legião Urbana album) (1991)
- V (Live album) (2001)
- V (Maroon 5 album) (2014)
- V (Saint Vitus album) (1990)
- V (Scale the Summit album) (2015)
- V (Spock's Beard album) (2000)
- V (The Bronx album), 2017
- V (The Fucking Champs album) (2002)
- V (The Horrors album) (2017)
- V (Van She album) (2008)
- V (Vanessa Hudgens album) (2006)
- V (Unknown Mortal Orchestra album) (2023)
- V (Wavves album) (2015)
- V. (album), by Wooden Shjips (2018)
- Five (Hollywood Undead album) (stylized as V)(2017)
- V – The New Mythology Suite (2000), by Symphony X
- V Live (album), a 2007 live album by Vitalic
- V, 2019, by Aaron Goodvin
- V, a cancelled album by Jonas Brothers
- V, 1991, by Steady B
- V, 2016, by Truckfighters
- V, a shelved album by Vanessa Amorosi
- V, 2014, by Voyager
- V, 2011, by Vreid

==== Other uses in music ====
- Dominant (music), theory the fifth scale degree of the diatonic scale
- V (group), a British boyband
- V Festival, an annual British music festival
  - V Festival (Australia)
- "V" (Lee Jung-hyun song), 2013

== Science and technology ==
=== Biology ===
- ATC code V (Various), a section of the Anatomical Therapeutic Chemical Classification System
- Haplogroup V (mtDNA), a human mitochondrial DNA haplogroup
- Trigeminal nerve, the fifth cranial nerve, or CN V
- Valine, an α-amino acid
- V formation, a bird flight pattern
- V-moth, the moth Macaria wauaria
- Vaccine

=== Telecommunications, electronics, computing, and mathematics ===
- V band, the band of frequencies from 40 to 75 GHz
- Red projection in the YUV color encoding system
- V, voltage, an electric potential difference in a circuit
  - V, Volt, an SI unit
- Socket V, codename of Intel's LGA 1700
- v (vee), an obscure unit of measurement in typography used in groff and troff
- V (programming language)
- V (operating system), 1981–1988
- V-Model, a model for a software development process
- V, a historical name for the "signal" operation on a semaphore (programming)
- ∨, descending wedge
  - ∨, logical disjunction
- Von Neumann universe in set theory
- Verschiebung operator in algebraic group theory

=== Other uses in science and technology ===
- v, v, v→, v, velocity
  - v, speed
- V number, the normalized frequency of an optical fiber
- V particle, an archaic name for a class of subatomic particles
- Vanadium, symbol V, a chemical element

== Transportation and military ==
- V engine, an internal combustion engine configuration
- Cadillac V series, high-performance vehicles
- Aion V, a Chinese electric SUV
- V (Los Angeles Railway), a streetcar service 1920–1963
- V (New York City Subway service), a former New York City Subway service
- The official West Japan Railway Company service symbol for:
  - Kansai Main Line
  - Hakubi Line
- Vic formation, a military aircraft flight pattern
- Avro Vulcan, Handley Page Victor and Vickers Valiant, three British military aircraft collectively known as the V bombers
- "V" device, an American military medal ribbon award
- Victor, military time zone for UTC−09

== Food and drink ==
- Ⓥ, symbol of Vinmonopolet, a Norwegian alcoholic beverage retailer
- ⓥ, a food label under vegetarian and vegan symbolism
- V (drink), an energy drink

== Linguistics ==
- The letter U, historically sometimes written like a V
- v, the symbol used in the International Phonetic Alphabet for the voiced labiodental fricative
- Verb, a part of speech

== Political parties ==
- Left Party (Sweden) (Vänsterpartiet)
- Venstre (Denmark)
- Venstre (Norway)

== Other uses ==
- Visa Inc., American financial services corporation whose stock ticker is V
- V sign, a hand gesture
- versus used in legal case citation, abbreviated "v."
- Le V, a hotel in Montreal, Quebec, Canada

== See also ==
- ν, the lower case Greek letter Nu
- V de V (disambiguation)
- Vee (disambiguation)
- Versus (disambiguation)
- vs (disambiguation)
- V series (disambiguation)
- V for Vendetta (disambiguation)
- 5 (disambiguation)
