= Mitsubishi Airtrek =

Mitsubishi Airtrek may refer to:

- Mitsubishi Outlander, an SUV originally known as the Mitsubishi Airtrek
- Mitsubishi Airtrek (China), an SUV manufactured for the Chinese market from 2021 to 2023
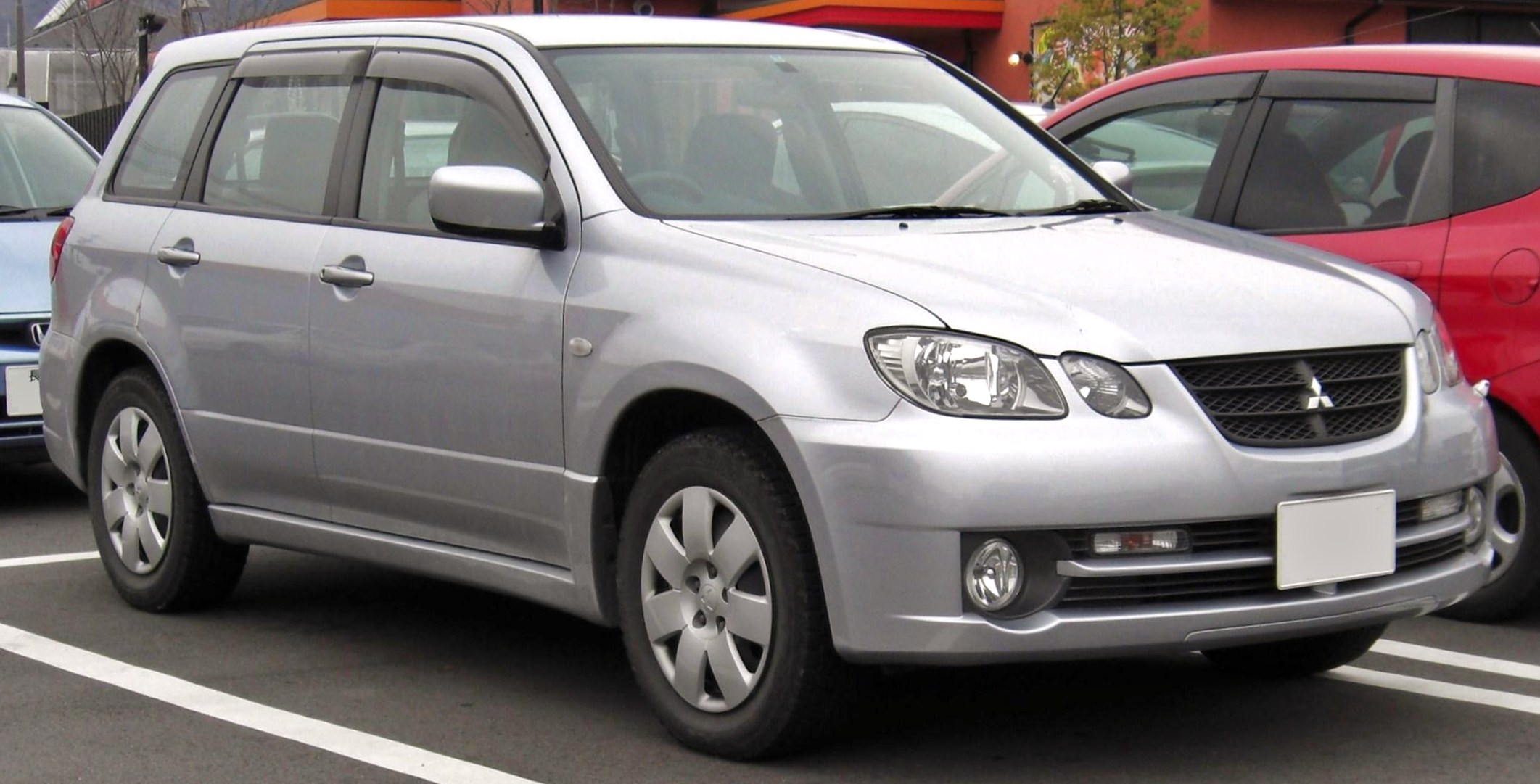
Mitsubishi Airtrek

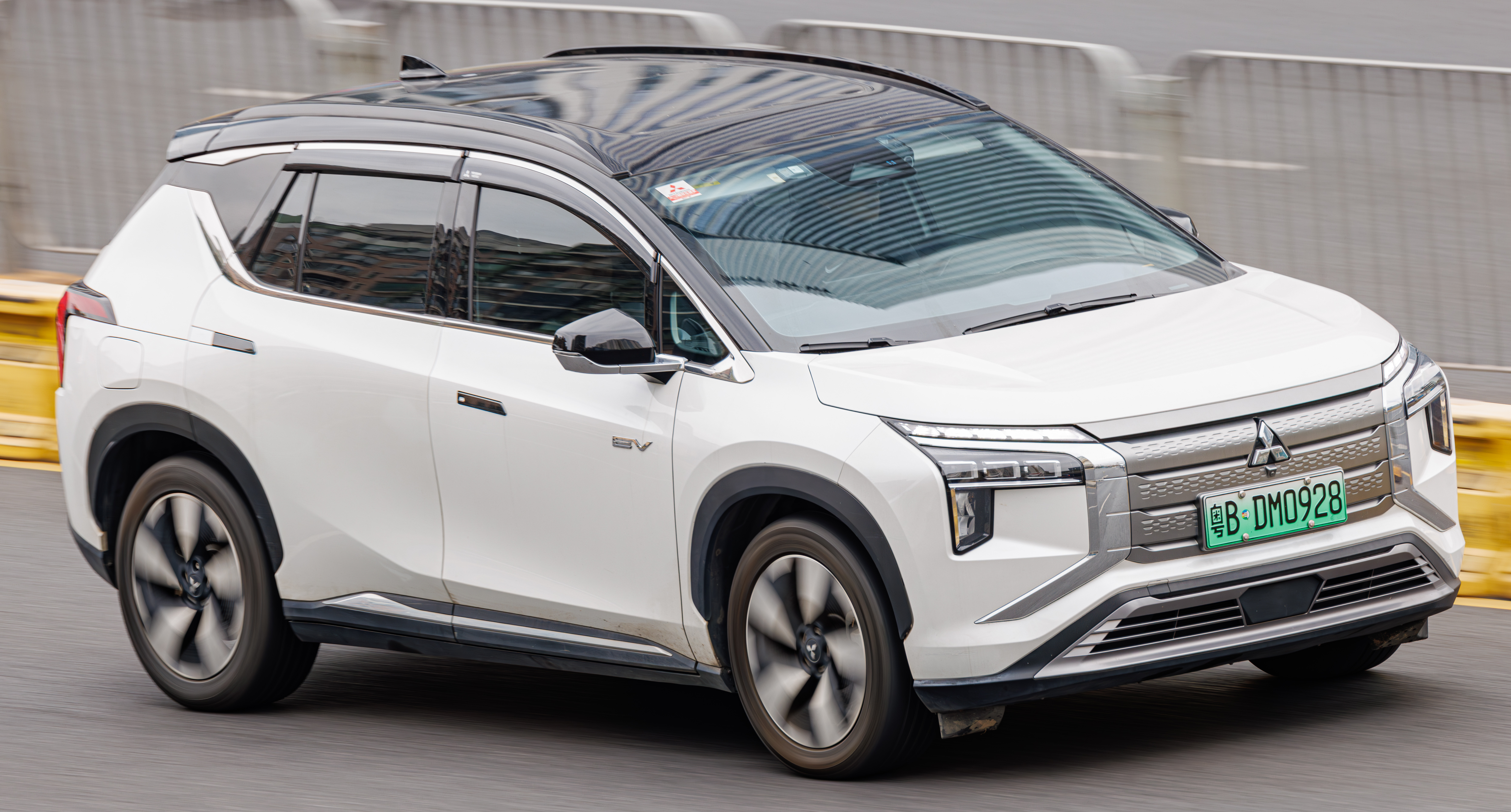
Mitsubishi Airtrek (China)
