= VV =

VV, V V, or v. v. may refer to:

== Arts and entertainment ==
- Vopli Vidopliassova, a Ukrainian rock band
- V/V, a secondary chord in music
- V.V., a character in Code Geass
- Vicarious Visions, a video game company
- Ville Valo, Finnish vocalist for gothic rock band HIM also known as VV

== Organisations ==
- Aerosvit Airlines (former IATA code: VV), a former Ukrainian airline
- Internal Troops of Russia (Vnutrenniye Voiska Ministerstva Vnutrennikh Del), a former paramilitary force
- Public Affairs (political party) (Věci veřejné), a political party
- Vicarious Visions, a video game company
- Viva Air Perú (former IATA code: VV), a former Ukrainian airline

== People ==
- Alison Mosshart (stage name VV; born 1978), American singer with The Kills
- Vasily Vorontsov (pseudonym VV; 1847–1918), Russian economist and sociologist
- Ville Valo (VV; born 1976), Finnish musician

== Science and technology ==
- v/v (volume by volume), the volume fraction
- VV Cephei, a star system
- Vorontsov-Vel'yaminov Interacting Galaxies, a catalogue of galaxies
- V//V, the Intel Viiv platform initiative

== Other uses ==
- W (early form: VV), a letter of the Latin alphabet
- Province of Vibo Valentia, Italy
- V.V. Fearless, former Surinamese football club based in Moengo
- Verses, including Bible verses, song verses, etc.
- Volume, a unit of measurement

== See also ==
- Double V campaign, World War II slogan promoting democracy overseas African American rights in the US
- Double V (album), 2017, by the rapper Mister V
- V de V (disambiguation)
- V&V (disambiguation)
- UU (disambiguation)
- W (disambiguation)
- V (disambiguation)
- Vice Versa (disambiguation)
