= Vee =

VEE, Vee or Vees may refer to:

- V, a letter

== People ==
=== Given name ===
- Vee F. Browne (born 1956), American writer of children's literature, and journalist

=== Surname ===
- Jimmy Vee (born 1959), British actor, puppeteer and stunt performer

=== Stage name ===
- Bobby Vee, American pop singer Robert Velline (1943–2016)
- Cristina Vee, American voice actress Cristina Valenzuela (born 1987)
- Krystal Vee, Thai model and actress Krystal Virulchanya (born 1987)
- Tesco Vee, American singer and musician Robert Vermeulen (born 1955)
- Vivien Vee, Italian singer Viviana Andreattini (born 1960)
- Vee Mampeezy or Vee, Botswanan musician Odirile Ishmael Sento (born 1983)

=== Nickname ===
- Vee Green (1900–1967), American football player, multi-sport coach and college athletics administrator
- Vee Guthrie, American illustrator of children's books and cookbooks Viola Guthrie (1920—2012)
- Vincent Sanford (born 1990), American basketball player nicknamed "Vee"
- Florendo M. Visitacion (1910–1999), Filipino-born American martial arts instructor commonly called "Professor Vee"

== Fictional characters ==
- Vee, in the television series Chuggington
- Yvonne "Vee" Parker, in the television series Orange Is the New Black
- Basilisk Number 5, AKA "Vee", a supporting character in the television series The Owl House
- The Vees, a trio of characters in the television series Hazbin Hotel
- Vee Boonyasak, a survivor character in the asymmetrical multiplayer survival horror videogame Dead by Daylight

== Sports ==
- Formula Vee, a junior motor racing formula
- Penticton Vees (senior), a former senior men's ice hockey team from Penticton, British Columbia, Canada
- Penticton Vees, a junior "A" ice hockey team from Penticton

== Other uses ==
- VEE (voltage), V_{EE}, a negative IC power-supply pin
- Vee, Estonia, a village
- Vee Gap, in the Knockmealdown Mountains of Ireland
- Vee belt, a type of mechanical belt
- VEE Corporation, now VStar Entertainment Group, a family entertainment production company
- Keysight VEE, a graphical dataflow programming software development environment from Keysight Technologies
- Venetie Airport (IATA code VEE), airport in Venetie, Alaska
- Venezuelan equine encephalitis virus
- Vee (v), an obscure unit of measurement in typography

== See also ==
- V (disambiguation)
- Vee Vee, a 1995 album by the American indie rock band Archers of Loaf
- Formula Super Vee, a former racing series
