= Trumpchi GE3 =

Chinese electric subcompact crossover SUV

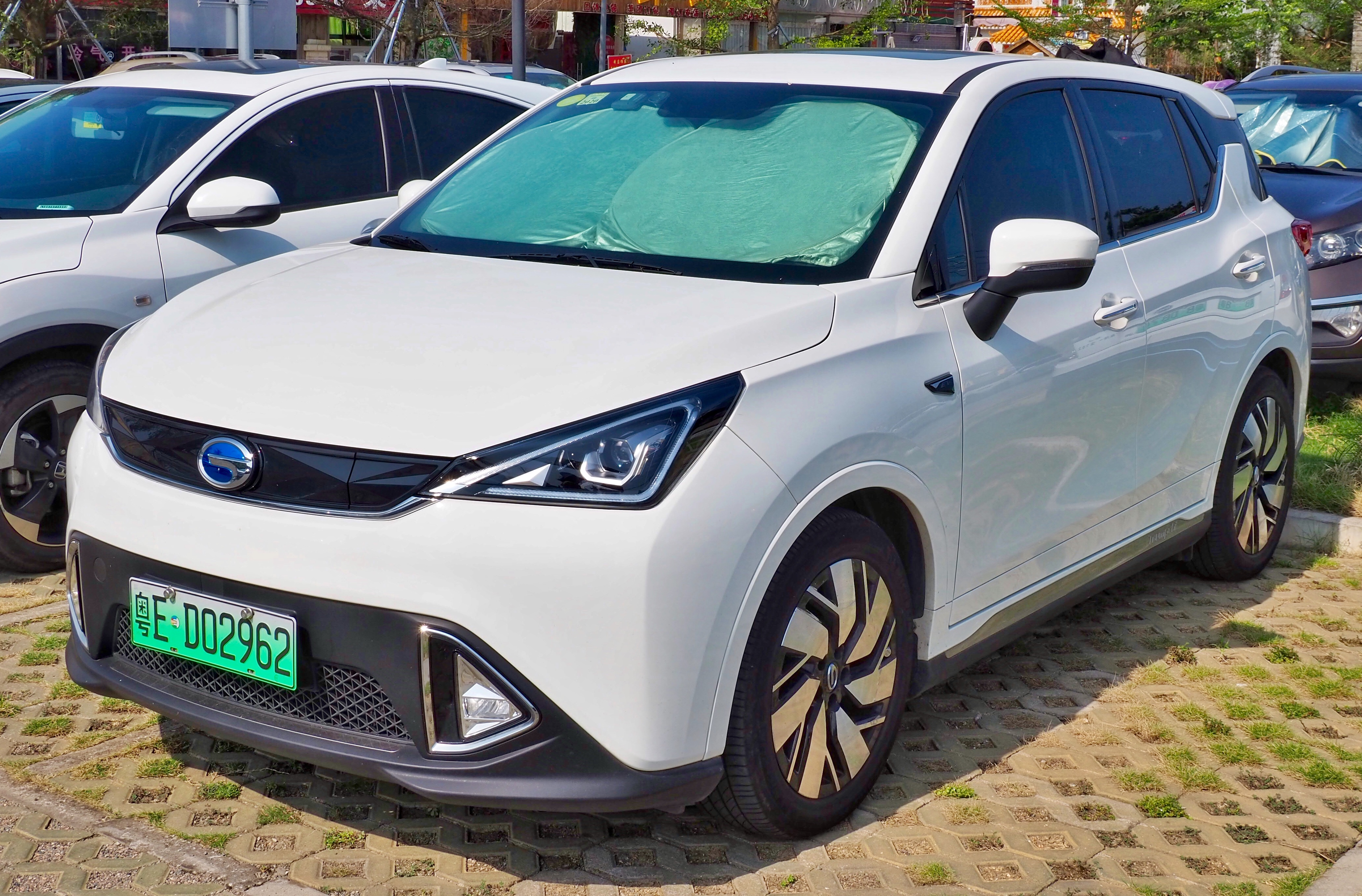
- Trumpchi GE3 EV

Overview
- Manufacturer: GAC Group
- Also called: Mitsubishi Eupheme EV (祺智EV); Mitsubishi E-More (concept)
- Production: 2017–2020
- Model years: 2017–2020
- Designer: Xiao Lin

Body and chassis
- Class: Subcompact crossover SUV
- Body style: 5-door SUV
- Layout: Electric Drive Unit, front-wheel drive
- Related: Trumpchi GS3

Powertrain
- Electric motor: 180 hp (130 kW) permanent magnet motor/generator, torque 290 N.m
- Battery: initially: 47.0 kWh lithium-ion, 288 cells, 96s3p GE3 530: 54.75 kWh lithium-ion
- Electric range: initially: 310 km (190 mi); GE3 530: 410 km (250 mi) NEDC
- Plug-in charging: 120 V, 240 V AC, SAE Combo DC Fast Charge

Dimensions
- Wheelbase: 2,560 mm (101 in)
- Length: 4,346 mm (171.1 in)
- Width: 1,825 mm (71.9 in)
- Height: 1,637 mm (64.4 in)
- Curb weight: 1,667 kg (3,675 lb)

Chronology
- Successor: Mitsubishi Airtrek (China) (for Mitsubishi Eupheme EV); Aion Y (for Trumpchi GE3)

The Trumpchi GE3 is a front-motor, five-door all-electric subcompact crossover SUV manufactured by GAC Group from 2017 to 2020. It is based on the internal combustion engine-powered first generation-Trumpchi GS3.

== Overview ==
The Trumpchi GE3 was revealed at the North American International Auto Show in Detroit, United States in January 2017, alongside the GS7 mid-size SUV and EnSpirit concept crossover SUV. It went on sale in China in July of that year.

The GE3 is powered by an electric motor with 177 hp with a top speed of 156 km/h and a range around 300 kilometers. The price of the Trumpchi GE3 ranges from 212,800 to 245,800 yuan.

For the GE3 530 model, the manufacturer claims are 54.75 kWh of battery capacity and 410 km of NEDC range.

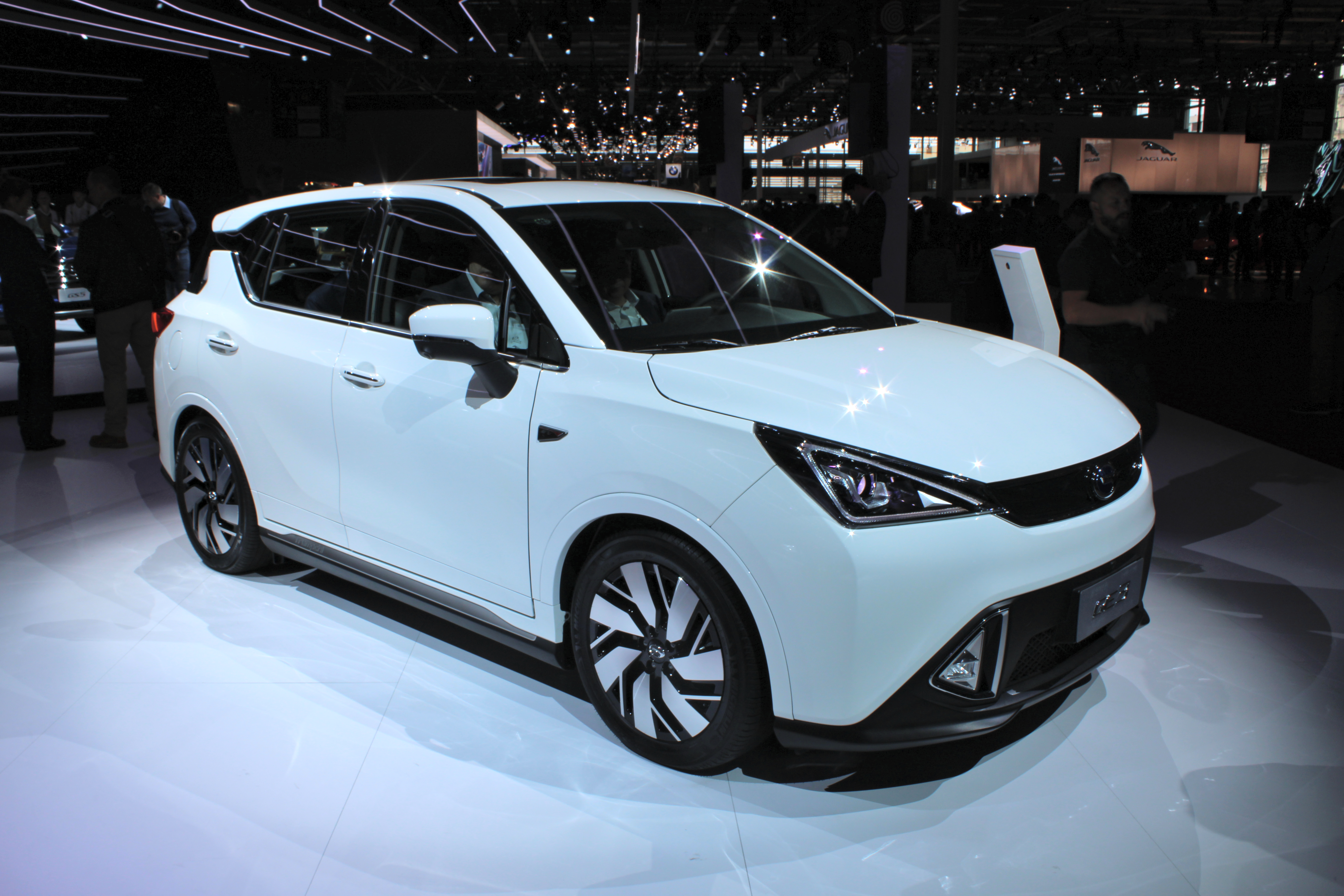
Trumpchi GE3 front

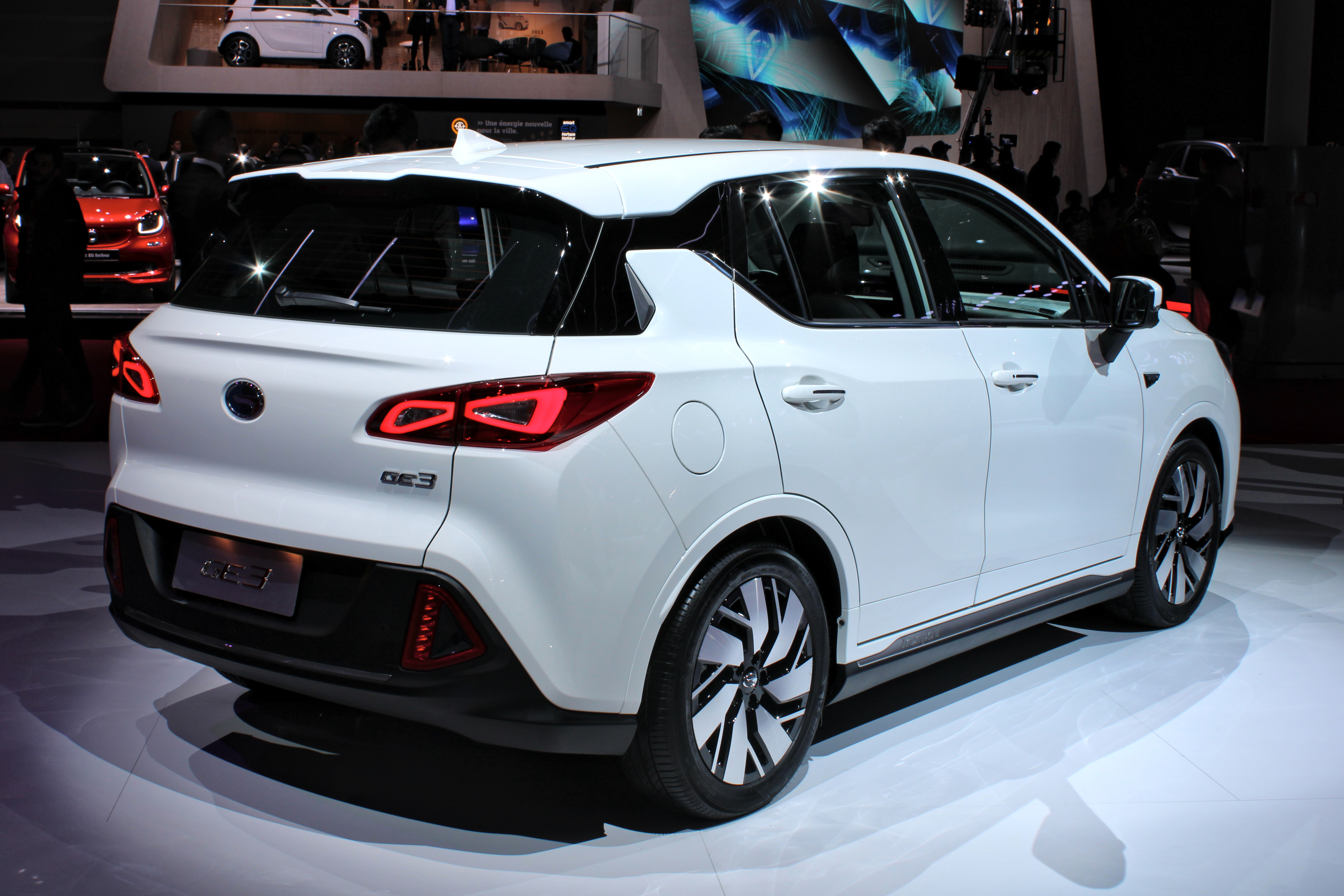
Trumpchi GE3 rear

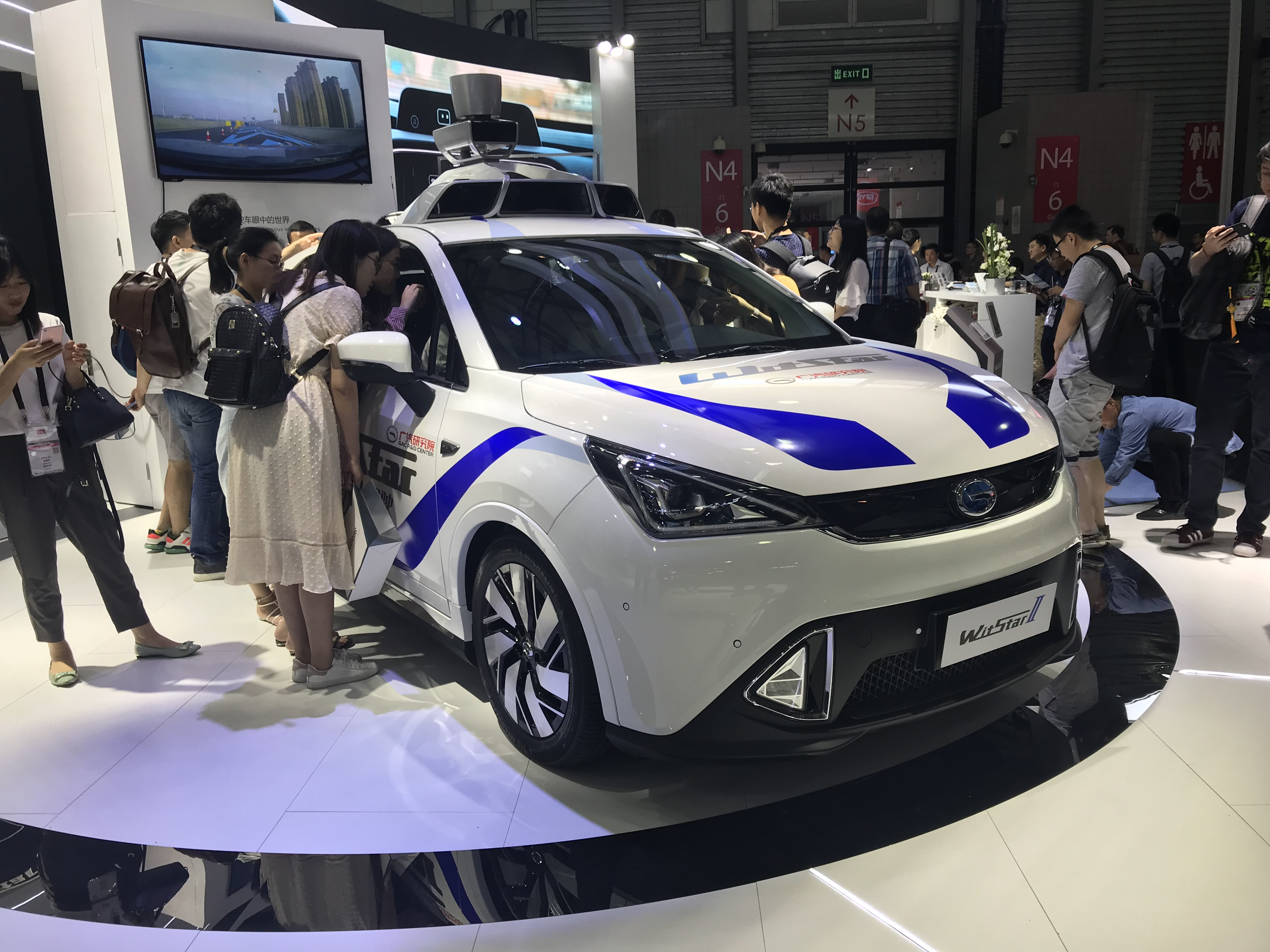
Trumpchi GE3 autonomous prototype at CES Asia

== GAC-Mitsubishi Eupheme EV and E-More concept ==
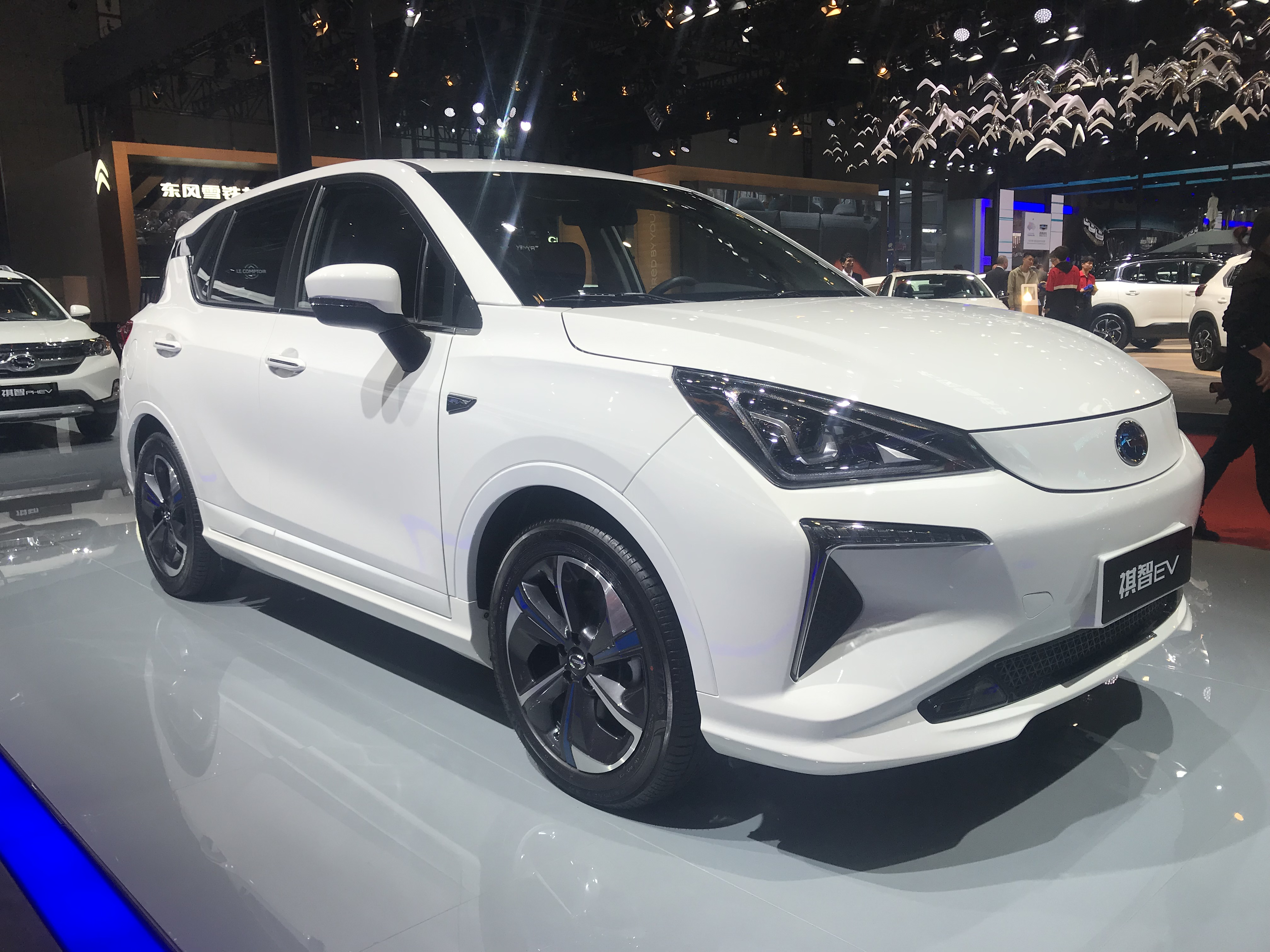
GAC-Mitsubishi E-More

During the 2018 Beijing Auto Show, GAC Mitsubishi launched the Guangzhou Auto E-More concept previewing an upcoming electric crossover. Despite Guangzhou Auto claiming that it was designed from the ground up as an EV, instead of being based on an existing petrol powered car, the Mitsubishi E-More was clearly based on the Trumpchi GS3. The production version of the Mitsubishi E-More will be launched in October.

The production version of the E-More concept was launched during the 2019 Shanghai Auto Show as the GAC-Mitsubishi Eupheme EV (祺智 EV). The Eupheme EV is equipped with a 180 horsepower(132 kW) and 290 N·m electric motor and a 54.75kWh battery capable of a 410 km electric range. The top speed of the Eupheme EV is 156 km/h.

== See also ==
- Government incentives for plug-in electric vehicles
- List of GAC vehicles
- List of production battery electric vehicles
- Plug-in electric vehicle
