= V&V =

V&V may refer to:

- verification and validation, in engineering and quality management systems
  - software verification and validation
- Victor and Valentino, animated television series
- Villains and Vigilantes, tabletop role-playing game

== See also ==
- IV&V
- VV (disambiguation)
