= V de V =

V de V may refer to:

- V de V (Vêtements de Vacance), a sportswear fashion brand by Michèle Rosier
- V de V Sports, a motor racing organisation owned by Eric Van de Vyver
  - V de V Challenge Monoplace, a single-seater racing series

== See also ==
- V (disambiguation)
- VV (disambiguation)
- Violadores del Verso, a Spanish rap music crew
