= GAC Mitsubishi =

Chinese vehicle manufacturer

GAC Mitsubishi Motors Co., Ltd.
- Trade name: GAC Mitsubishi
- Company type: Joint venture
- Industry: Automotive
- Founded: 25 September 2012; 13 years ago
- Defunct: 3 March 2024; 2 years ago
- Fate: Acquired and absorbed by GAC Aion in 2024
- Headquarters: Changsha, China
- Area served: China
- Products: Automobiles
- Owner: GAC Group (50%); Mitsubishi Motors (30%); Mitsubishi Corporation (20%)
- Website: www.gmmc.com.cn

GAC Mitsubishi Motors Co., Ltd. was a joint venture automobile manufacturing company headquartered in Changsha, China. Established in 2012, it was the second vehicle manufacturing joint venture of Mitsubishi Motors in China after Soueast.

The company was dissolved in 2023 as a joint venture and was acquired by GAC Aion.

== History ==
The company was founded on September 25, 2012. The GAC Group held 50%, Mitsubishi Motors 30%, and Mitsubishi Corporation 20%. Other sources give 50%, 33% and 17%.

In the same year the production of automobiles began under the Mitsubishi brand. The plant had a production capacity of 100,000 vehicles in 2016. Engines have also been manufactured since 2018.

In 2019, GAC Mitsubishi Motors' annual sales were 133,000 vehicles; in 2020, annual sales were 75,000 vehicles; in 2021, they dropped to 66,000 vehicles; in 2022, they dropped to 33,600 vehicles. In the first quarter of 2023, GAC Mitsubishi's vehicle sales were 3,969 units, a year-on-year decrease of 58%. Because sales did not meet expectations, there was news that Mitsubishi would withdraw from China. However, Mitsubishi Motors President Takao Kato denied it in May 2023 and said that it was necessary to carry out structural reforms for the company.

On 27 September 2023, Mitsubishi Motor announced its decision to quit the Chinese market. According to the statement of Mitsubishi Motor, the company could not cope with the fierce competition in Chinese market and judged that the joint venture would no longer be profitable.

On October 24, 2023, GAC Group announced the restructuring plan of GAC Mitsubishi. In terms of debt repayment, the three shareholders jointly increased investment in GAC Mitsubishi and its sales company to repay debts. In terms of share changes, GAC Group acquired 30% and 20% of the equity of GAC Mitsubishi held by Mitsubishi Motors and Mitsubishi Corporation respectively for a consideration of RMB 1. At that time, GAC Mitsubishi would become a wholly owned subsidiary of GAC Group; and GAC Mitsubishi Motors Sales Company under GAC Mitsubishi would be jointly held by GAC Group, Mitsubishi Motors and Mitsubishi Corporation, and continue to provide spare parts and after-sales services to the original GAC Mitsubishi owners. In terms of production, the company would stop the production of Mitsubishi brand models, and the production capacity would be taken over by GAC Aion. GAC Mitsubishi intended to sell some available equipment to GAC Aion, and lease the land and factory buildings to GAC Aion.

On March 3, 2024, GAC Mitsubishi Motors Co., Ltd. was officially renamed Hunan Zhixiang Automobile Management Co., Ltd. On the 20th of the same month, GAC Group issued an announcement that it planned to transfer 100% of the equity of Hunan Zhixiang Automobile to its holding subsidiary GAC Aion, which will also inject capital into the company with its own funds.

== Vehicles ==
Mitsubishi ASX, Outlander and Pajero were recorded for 2016. A source from 2020 confirms these three models and also names the Eclipse Cross. According to this source, the Pajero was produced until 2015, the ASX since 2013, the Outlander since 2016, while no period is given for the Eclipse Cross.

The Mitsubishi Airtrek was produced by GAC Mitsubishi starting from the 2022 model year.

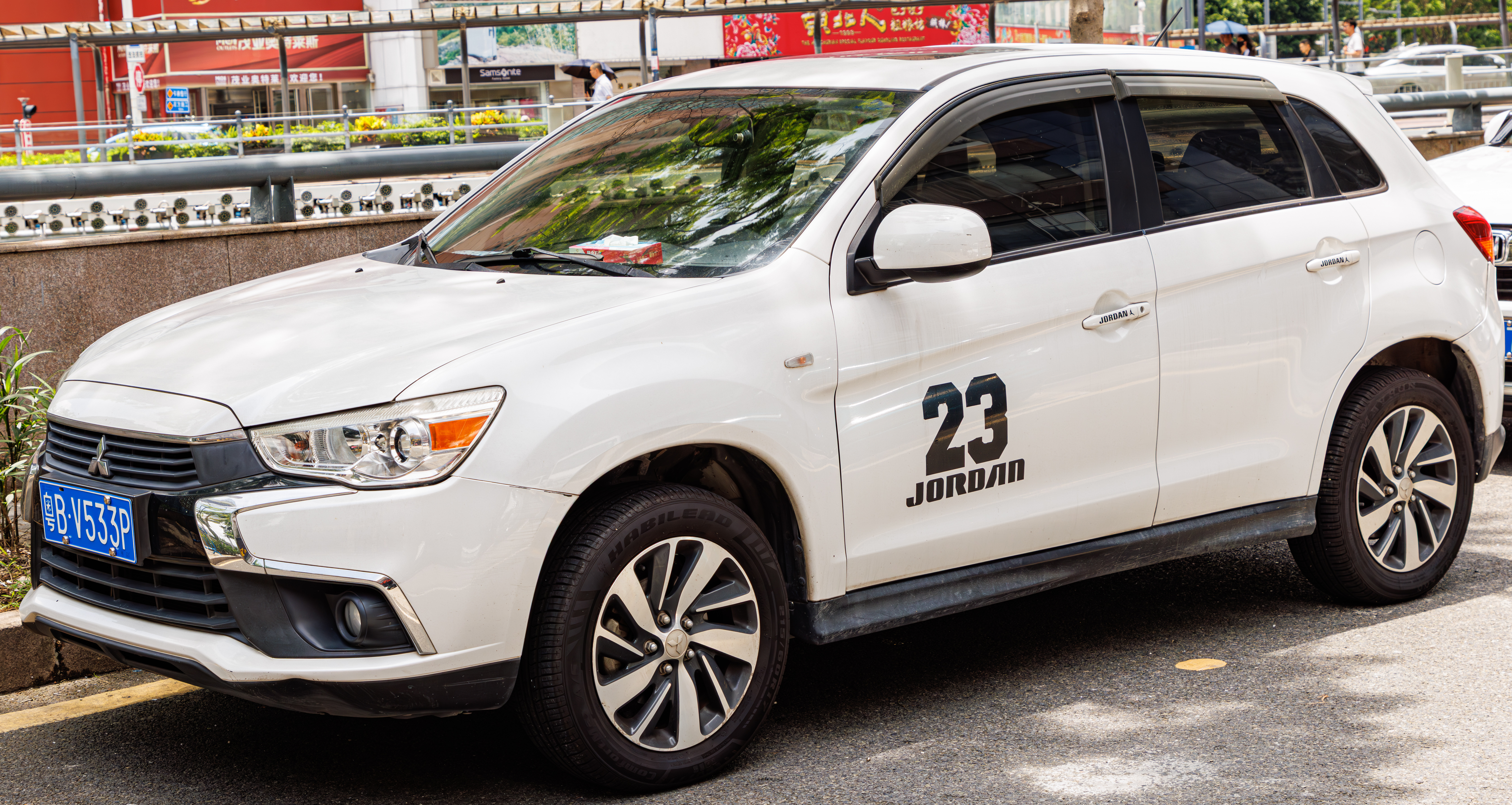
Mitsubishi ASX

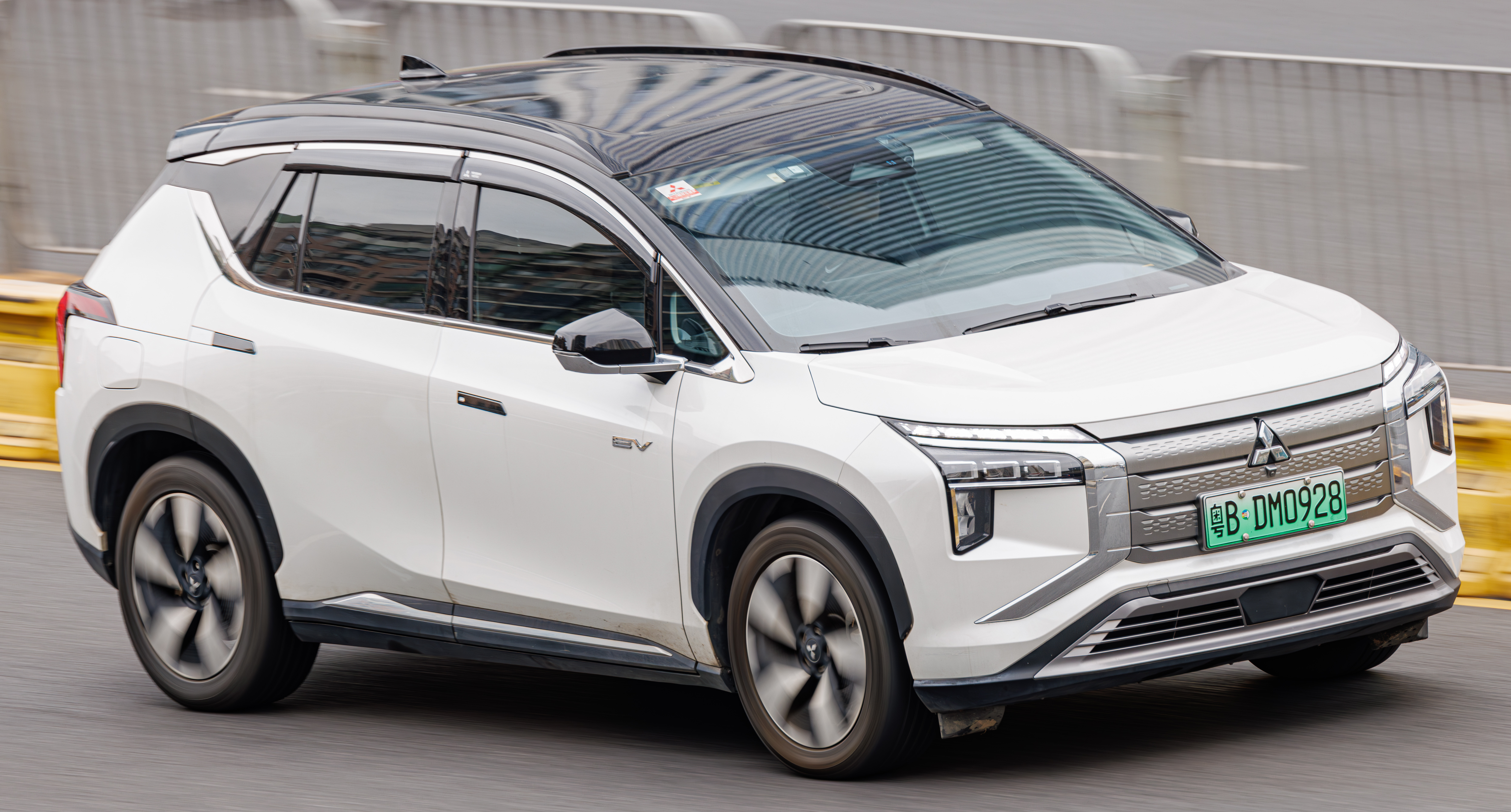
Mitsubishi Airtrek

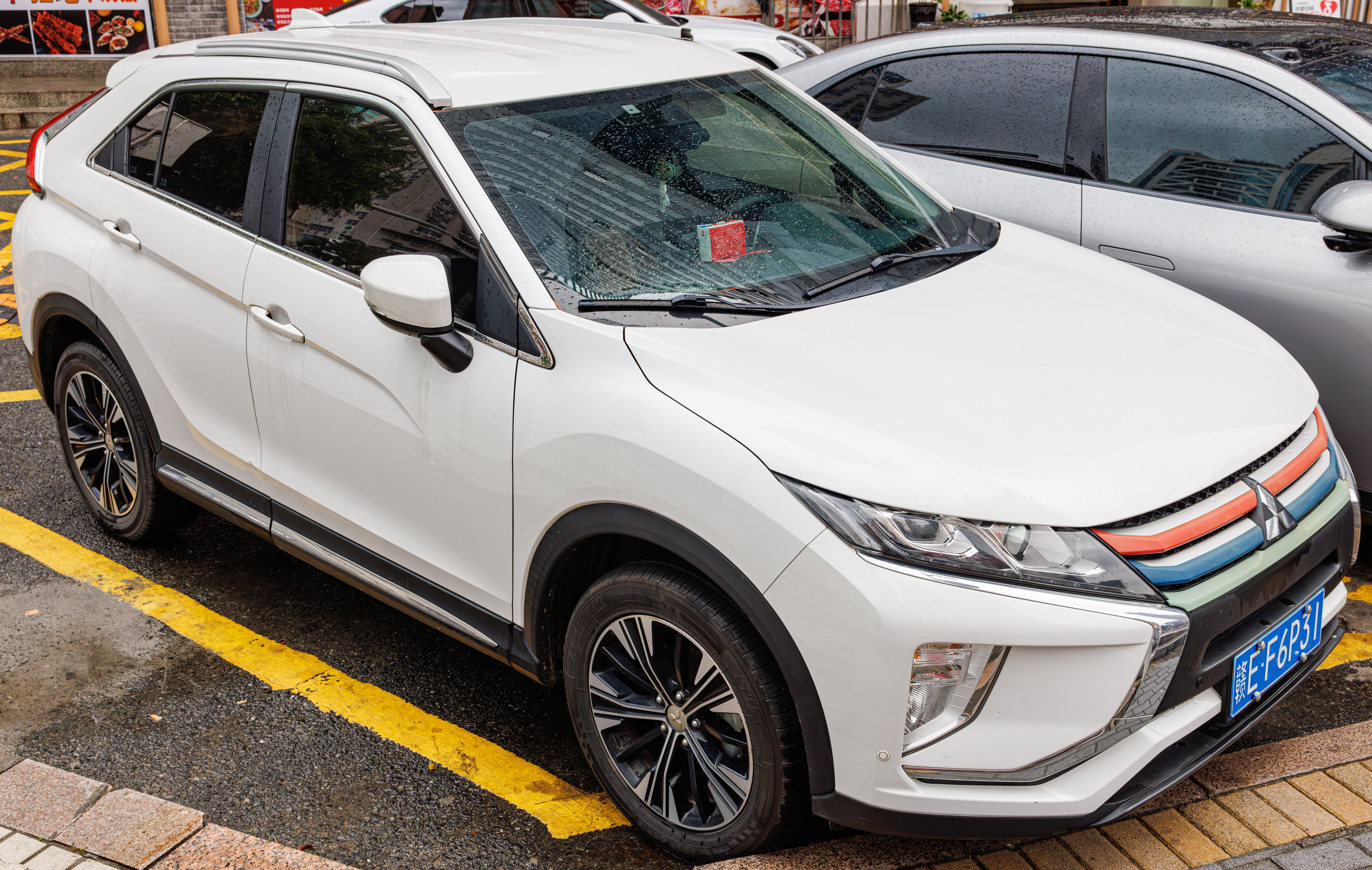
Mitsubishi Eclipse Cross

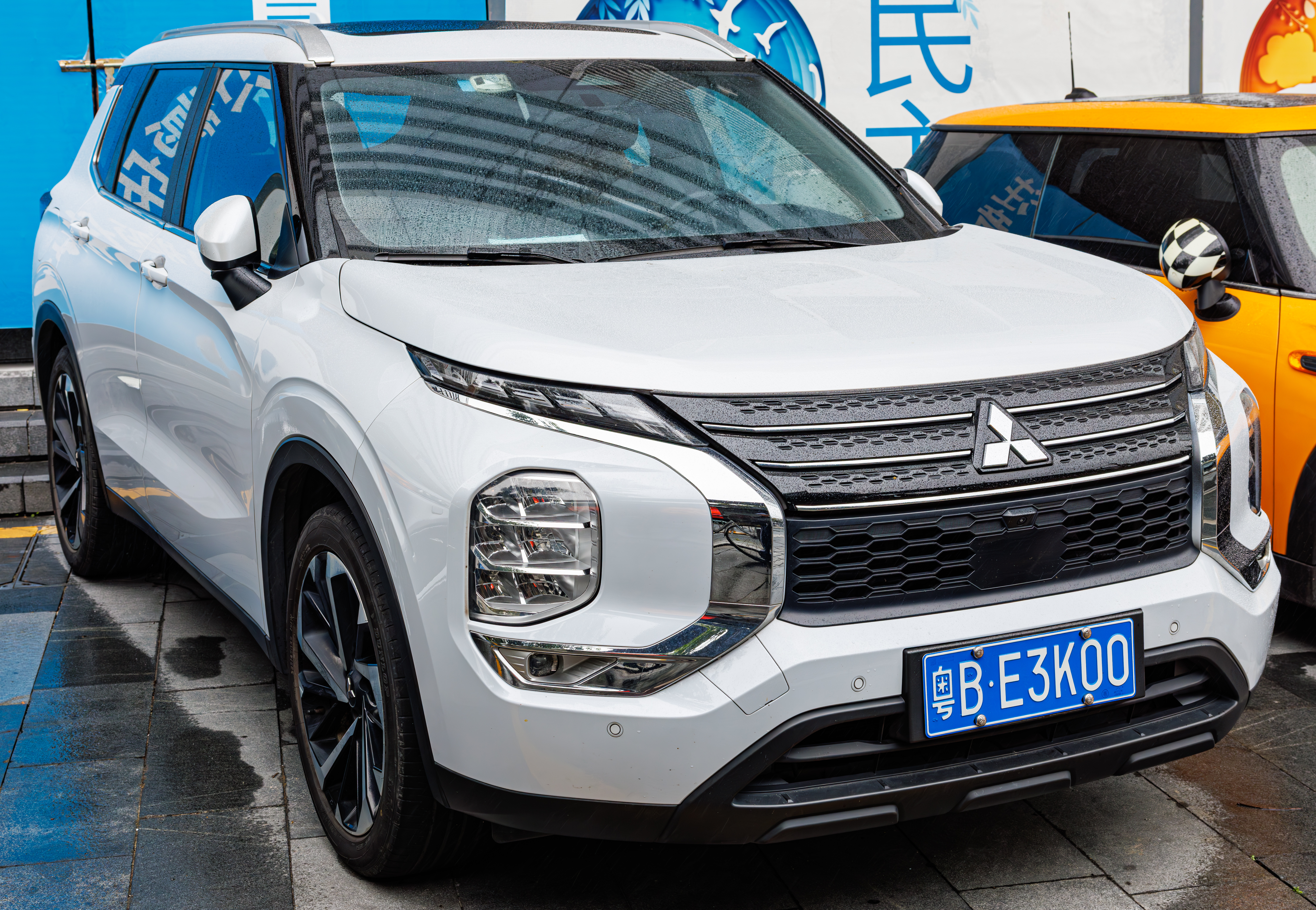
Mitsubishi Outlander

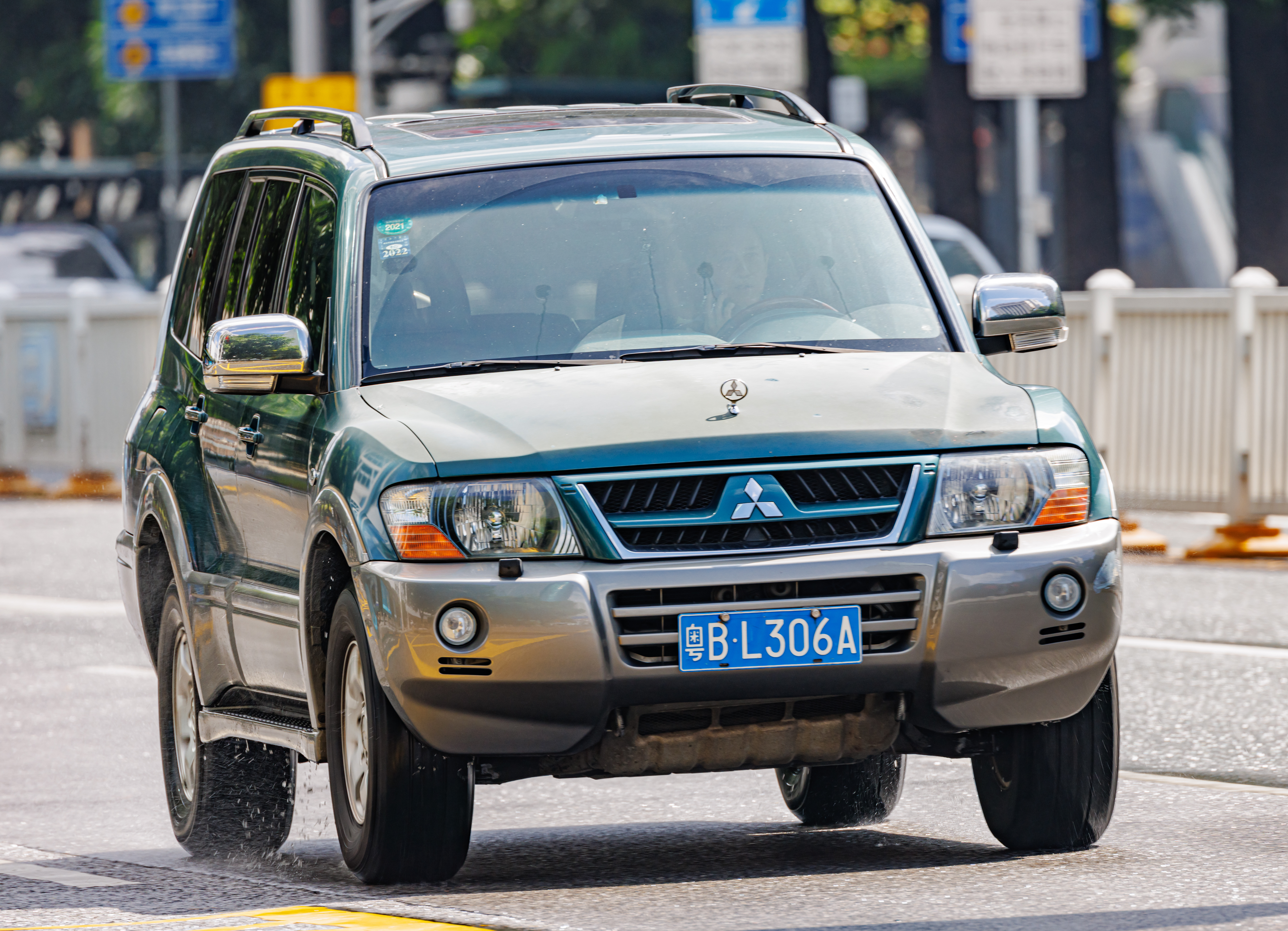
Mitsubishi Pajero

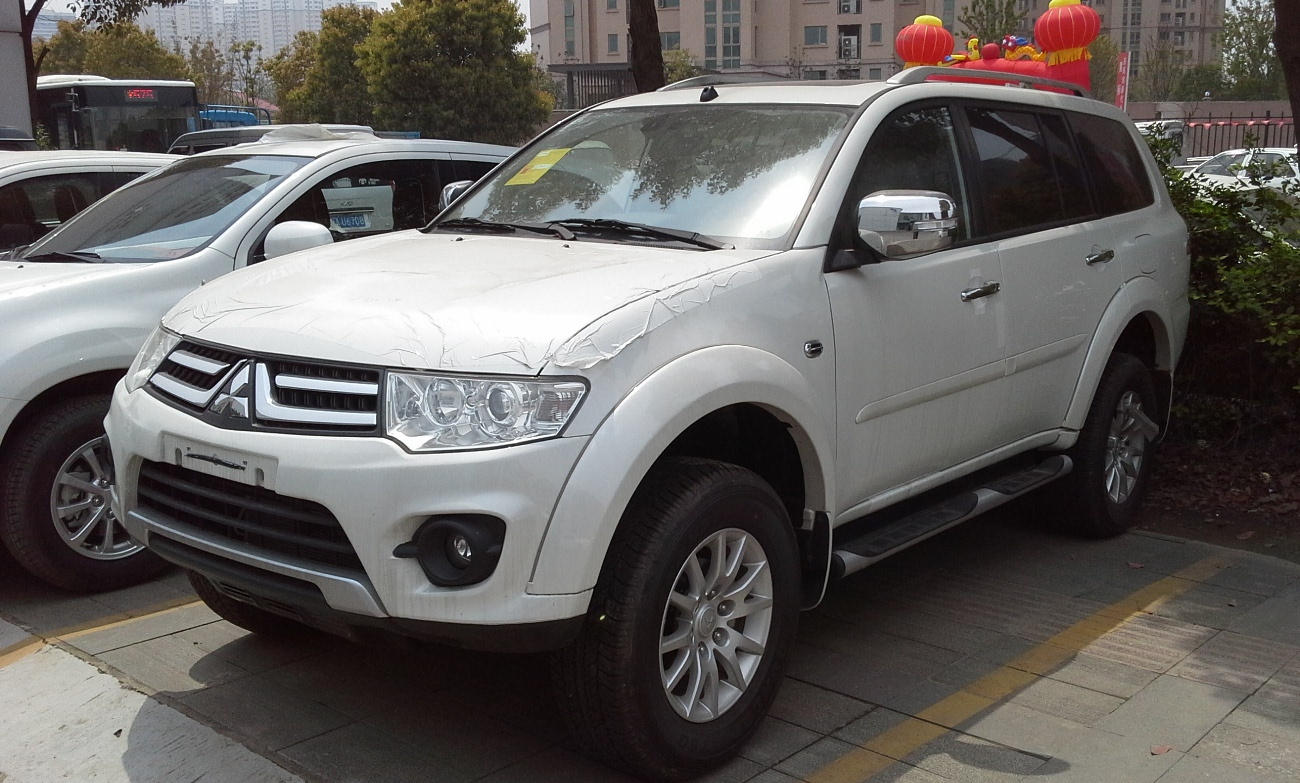
Mitsubishi Pajero Sport

=== Eupheme ===
Eupheme is the brand of the GAC Mitsubishi joint venture. The Eupheme PHEV and Eupheme EV are the two products sold and manufactured by GAC Mitsubishi under the brand.

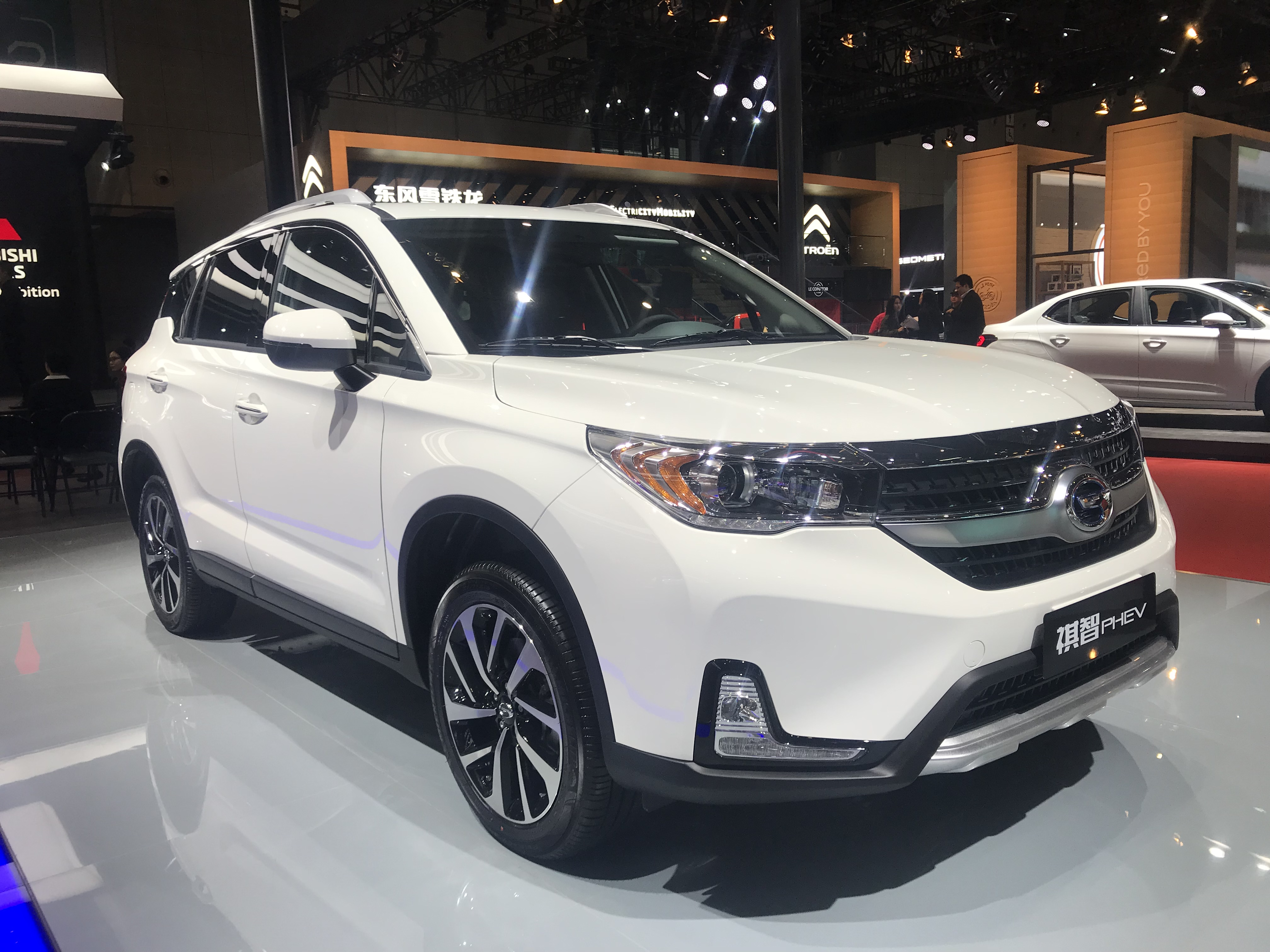
Eupheme PHEV

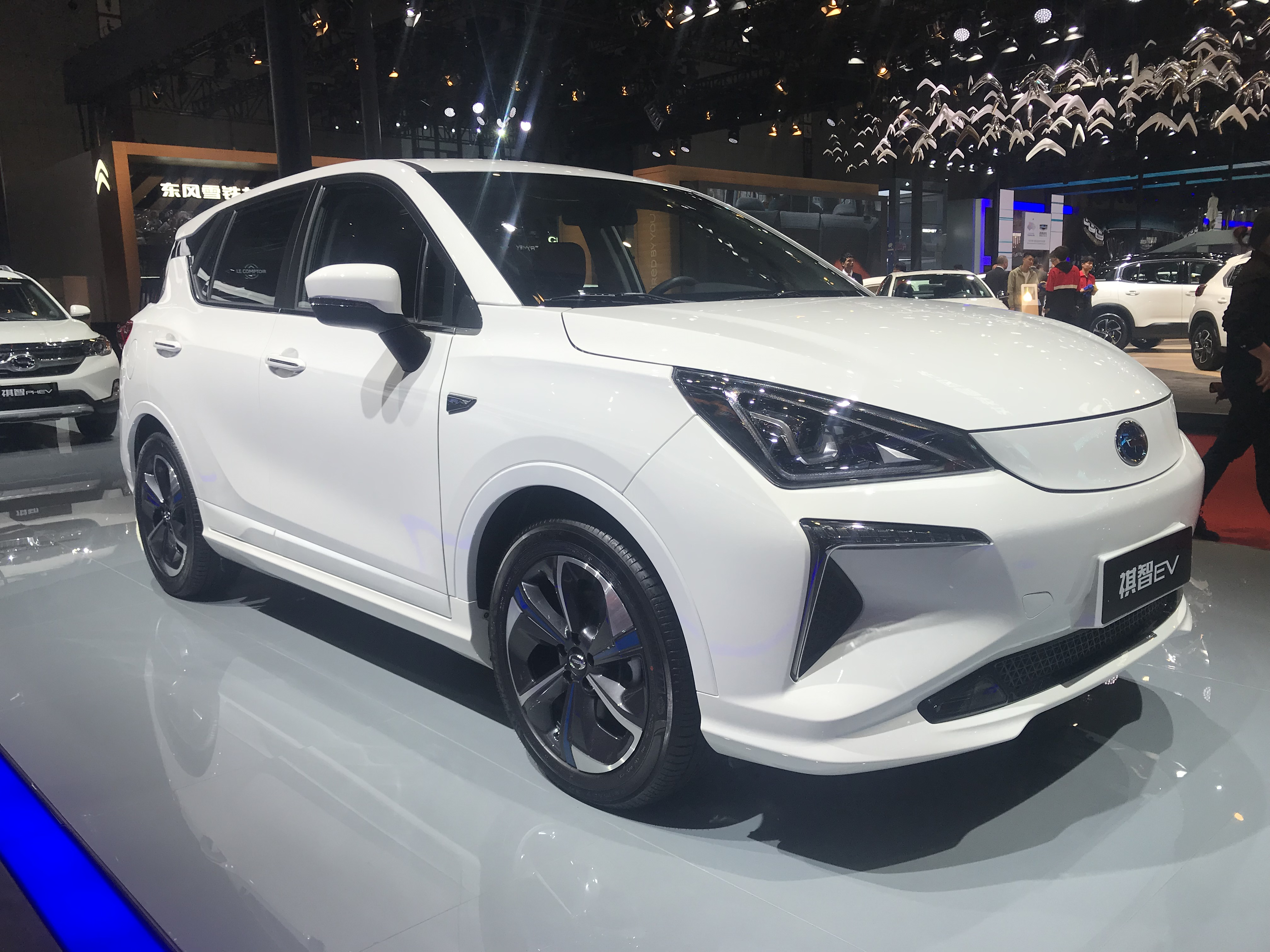
Eupheme EV

== Sales figures ==
56,700 vehicles were built in 2016.
