= Mitsubishi Airtrek (China) =

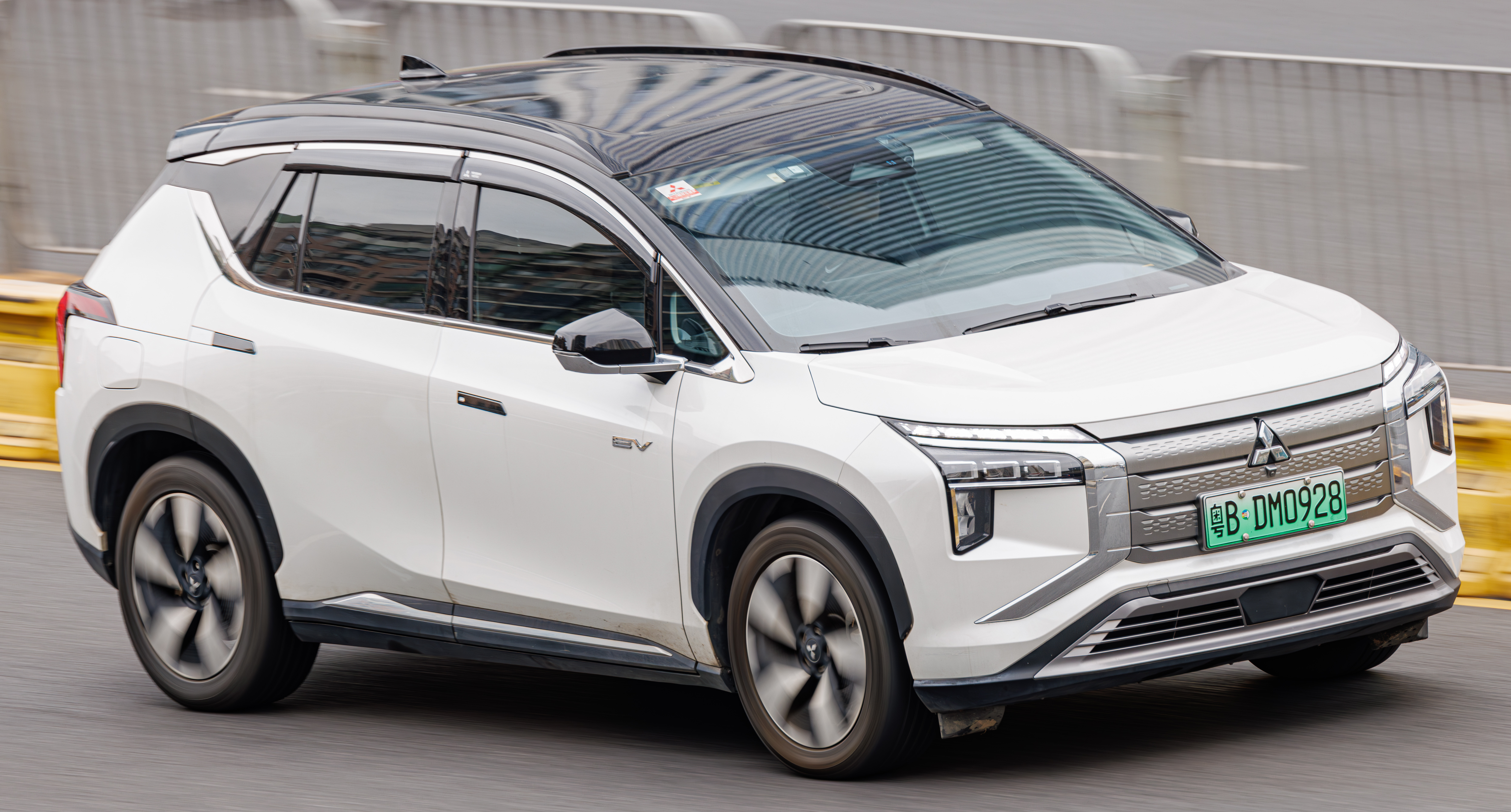
- Mitsubishi Airtrek Front view

Overview
- Manufacturer: Mitsubishi Motors
- Production: 2021–2023
- Assembly: China: Guangzhou (GAC Mitsubishi)

Body and chassis
- Class: Compact crossover SUV
- Body style: 5-door SUV
- Layout: Front-motor, front-wheel-drive
- Related: Aion V

Powertrain
- Electric motor: Permanent-magnet synchronous motor
- Power output: 135 kW (181 hp; 184 PS)
- Transmission: 1-speed direct-drive
- Battery: 70 kWh lithium-ion
- Electric range: 520 km (323.1 mi) (CLTC)

Dimensions
- Wheelbase: 2,830 mm (111.4 in)
- Length: 4,630 mm (182.3 in)
- Width: 1,920 mm (75.6 in)
- Height: 1,728 mm (68.0 in)
- Curb weight: 1,900 kg (4,189 lb)

Chronology
- Predecessor: Mitsubishi Eupheme EV

The Mitsubishi Airtrek (Chinese: 阿图柯; pinyin: Ātúkē) is a battery-electric compact crossover SUV produced by GAC Mitsubishi, a joint venture of Guangzhou Automobile Corporation and Mitsubishi Motors from 2021 to 2023.

== Overview ==
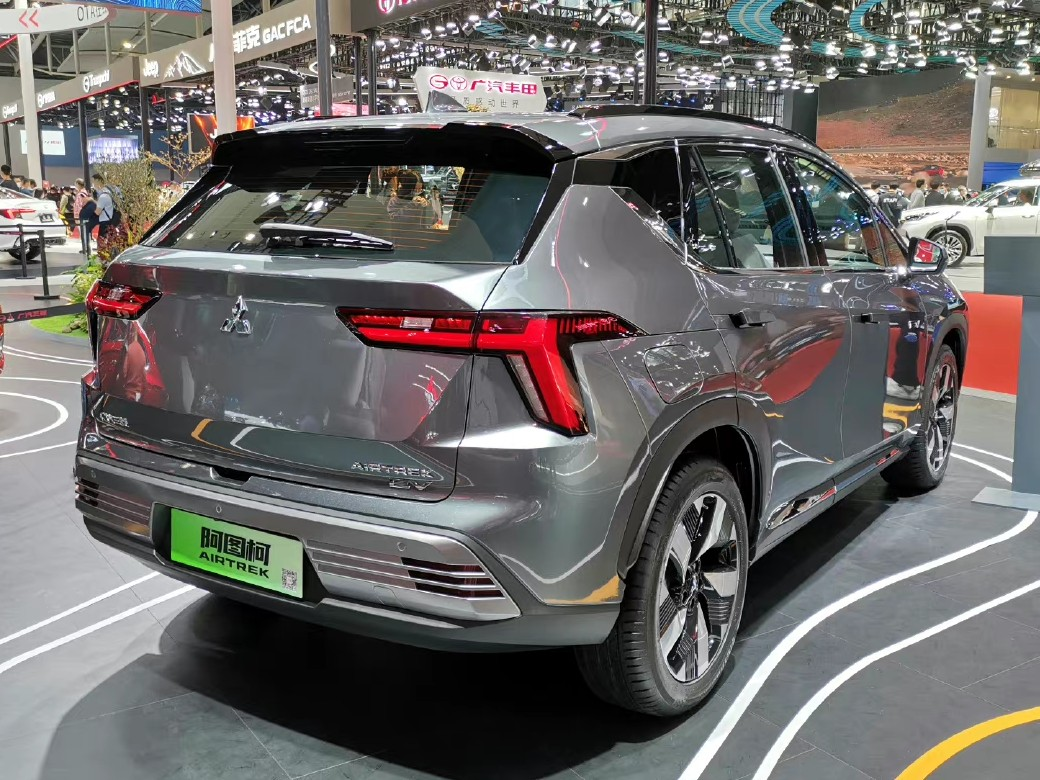
Rear view

The Airtrek was revealed at Auto Guangzhou in November 2021 after previewing the Airtrek as a namesake concept in April 2021 at Auto Shanghai. It is based on the same platform as the Aion V and features Level 2 semi-autonomous driving functionality using nine radars and cameras for accelerate, brake, and lane assist functions.

The Airtrek went on sale exclusively in China in early 2022.

In September 2023, Mitsubishi ended vehicle production in China.

=== Powertrain ===
The Airtrek is powered by a 70 kWh lithium-ion battery, paired to a 135 kW (181 hp; 184 PS) electric motor delivering a claimed range on China's CLTC test cycle of 520 km (323.1 mi). Driving dynamics are aided by a low-mounted battery with a low-positioned center of mass and a 50:50 weight distribution.
