= Aion V =

Battery electric compact crossover SUV

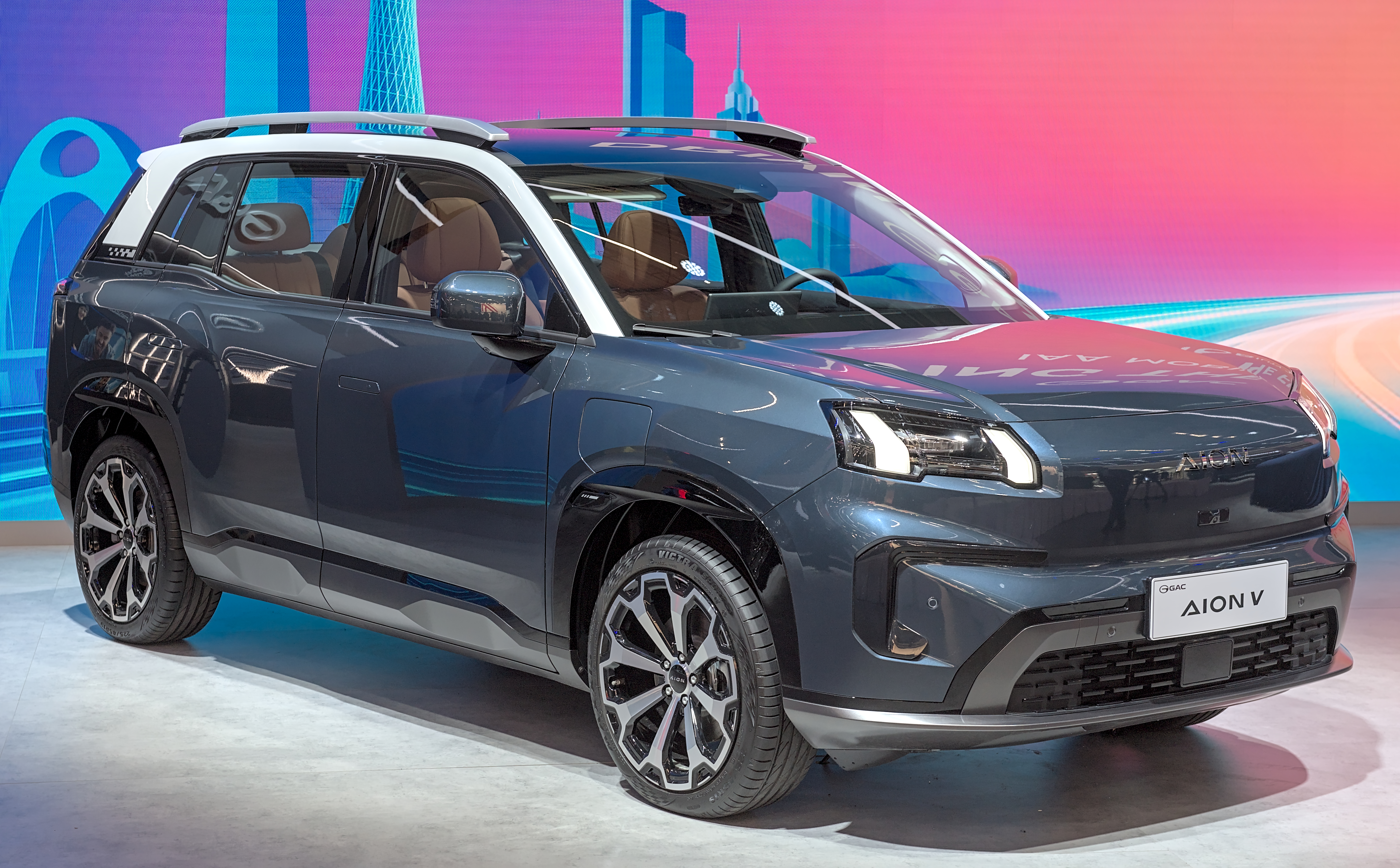

Overview
- Manufacturer: GAC Aion
- Production: 2020–present

Body and chassis
- Class: Compact crossover SUV (C)
- Body style: 5-door SUV
- Layout: Front-motor, front-wheel-drive

The Aion V is a battery electric compact crossover SUV produced by GAC Aion. The first generation was launched in 2020, with a major facelift variant called the Aion V Plus launched in 2021. The second generation model was released in 2024.

== First generation (2020) ==
First generation
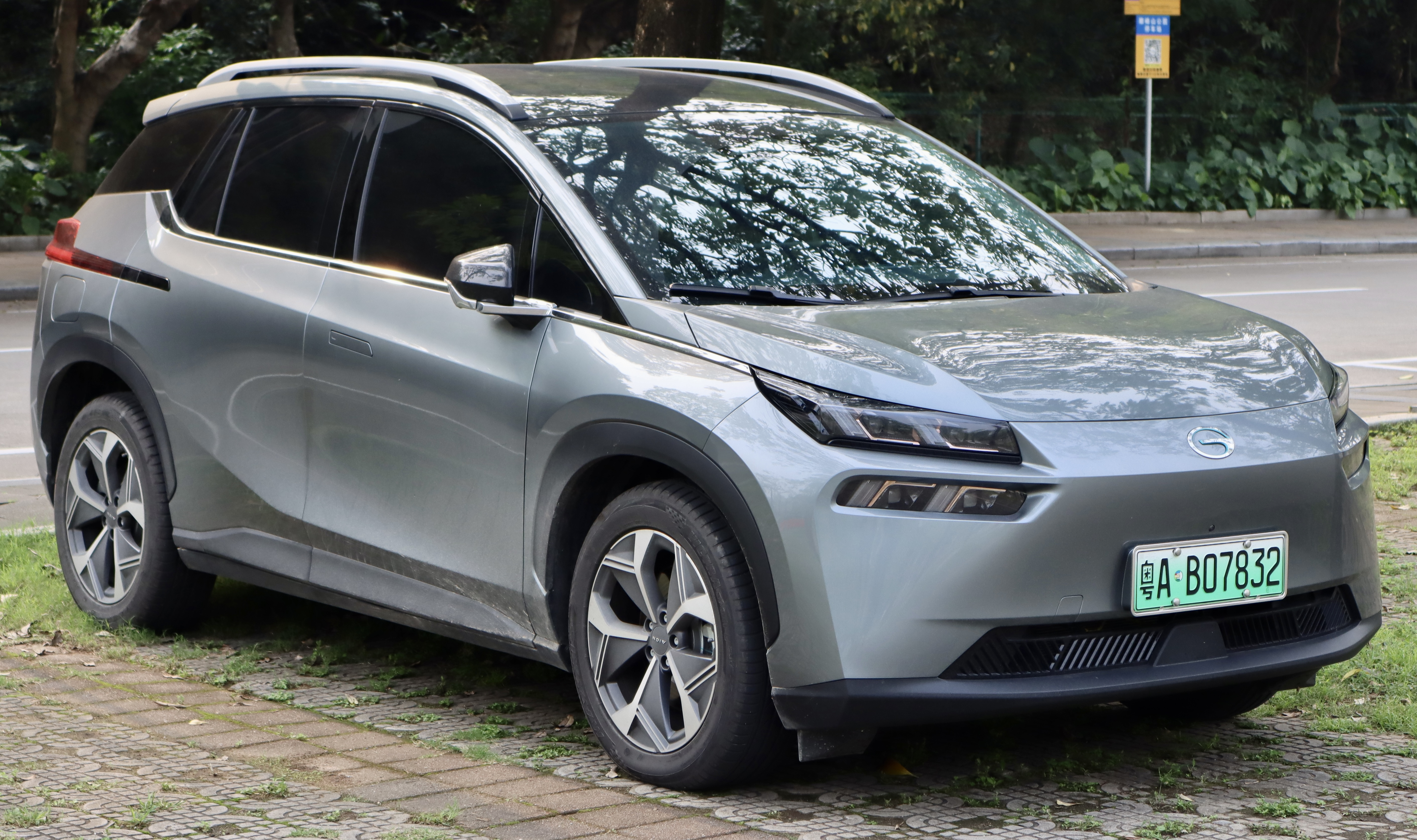
- Aion V Plus

Overview
- Production: 2020–2024
- Assembly: China: Guangzhou
- Designer: Qi Wang

Body and chassis
- Related: Mitsubishi Airtrek

Powertrain
- Electric motor: 135 kW (181 hp) permanent magnet synchronous motor
- Battery: CATL lithium ion
- Electric range: V 60: 400 km (249 mi); V 70: 530 km (329 mi); V 80 Max: 600 km (373 mi)

Dimensions
- Wheelbase: 2,830 mm (111.4 in)
- Length: 4,586 mm (180.6 in) 4,650 mm (183.1 in) (V Plus)
- Width: 1,920 mm (75.6 in)
- Height: 1,728 mm (68.0 in) 1,720 mm (67.7 in) (V Plus)

The first generation was revealed on GAC New Energy's WeChat account on 14 May 2020, announcing that the model would launch on 16 June 2020. It is Aion's third model after the S and LX and the brand's second SUV.

=== Specifications ===
The Aion V has four trim levels, V 60, V 70, and V 80 Max, which, according to New European Driving Cycle, have 400 km (249 mi), 530 km (329 mi), and 600 km (373 mi) ranges respectively. The car uses a CATL lithium-ion battery and features Huawei 5G and V2X communication systems.

Multiple color-customizable features are available, including a two-tone paint option and color options for the antenna and spoiler.

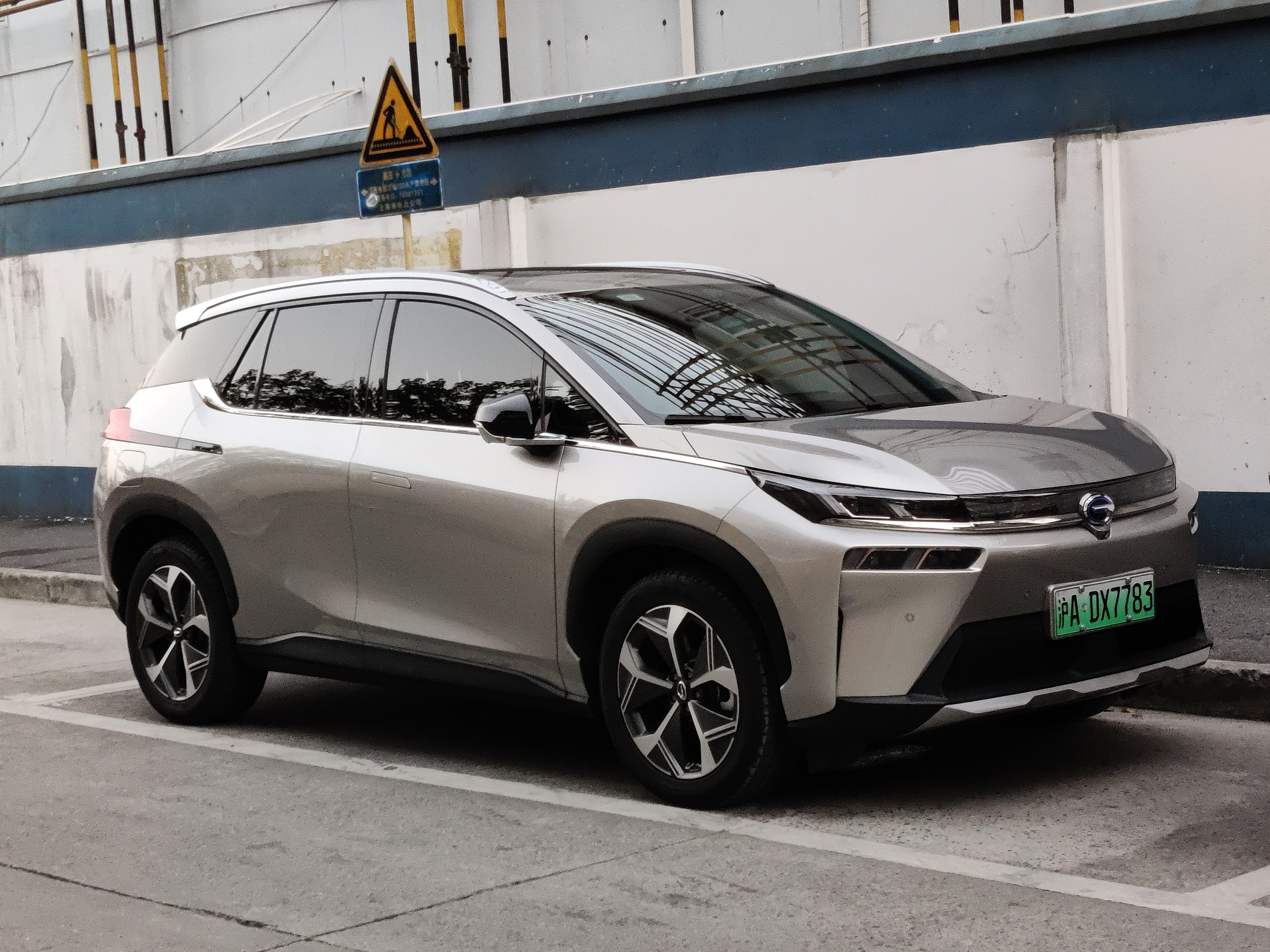
Aion V

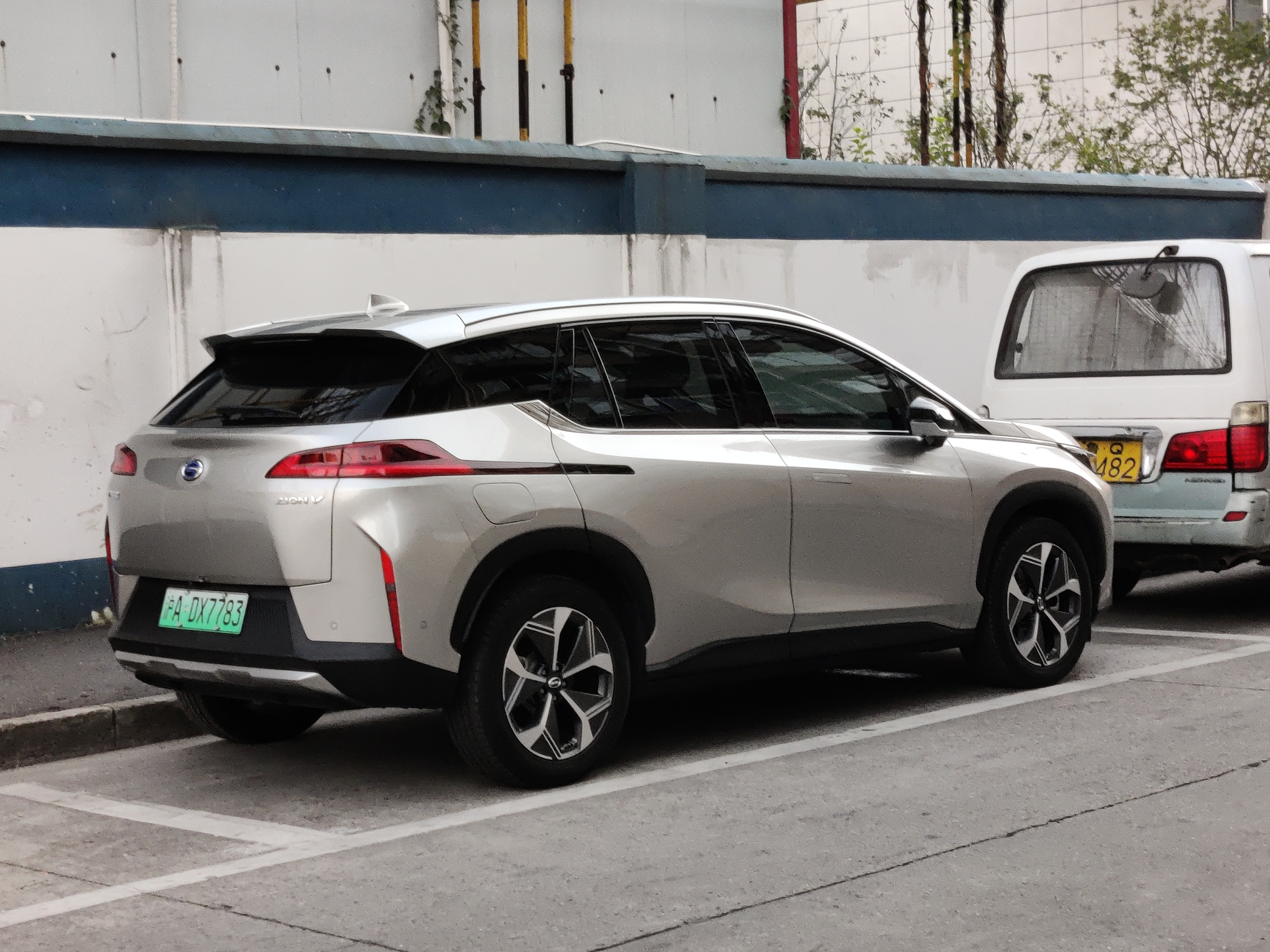
Rear view

=== Aion V Plus ===
The Aion V Plus was unveiled in September 2021 as a refreshed version of the V. The Aion V Plus sports redesigned front and rear end styling and interior while featuring ultrafast charging technology with the battery capable to be charged at up to 880 V with a maximum charge power of 480 kW.

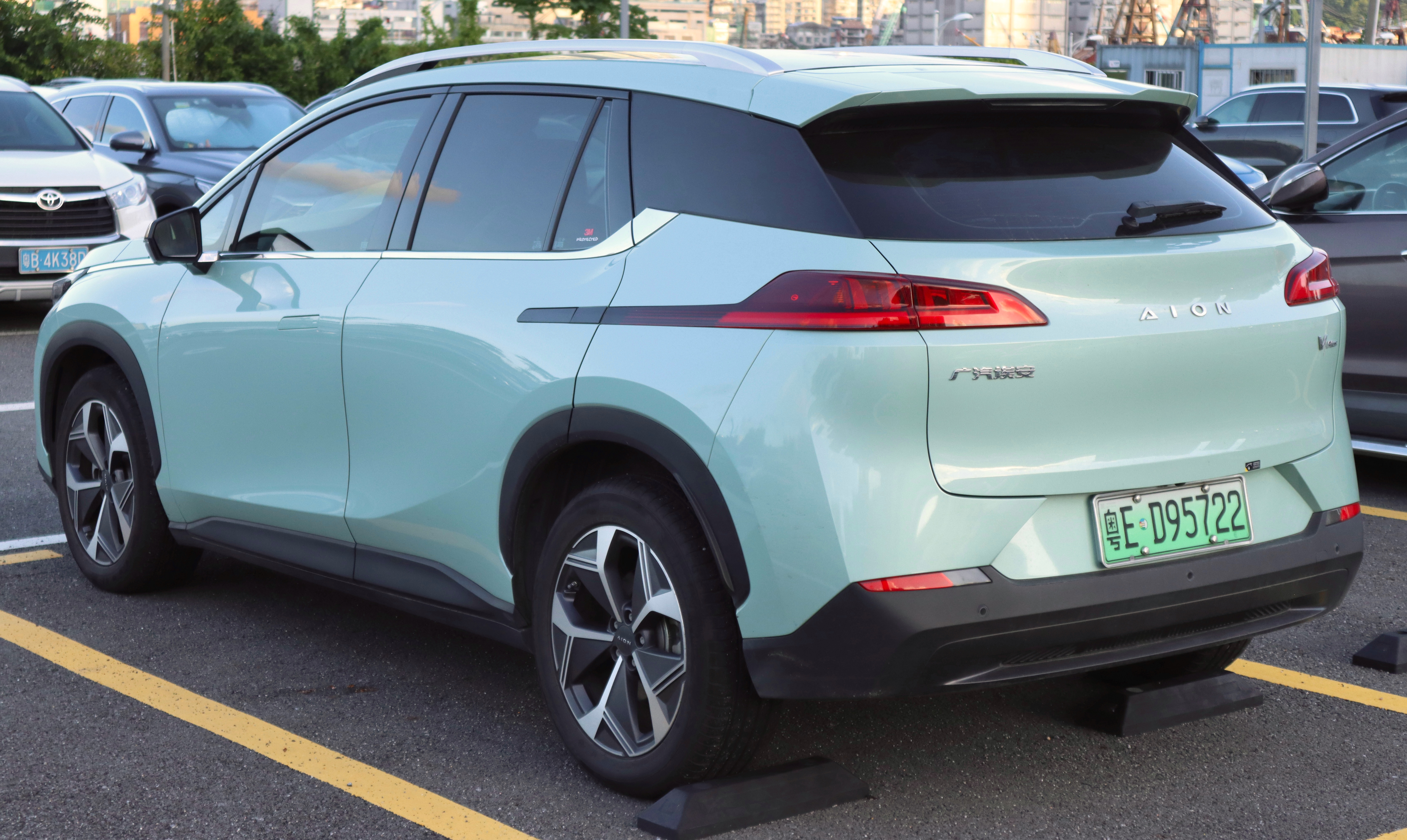
Rear view

==== Design ====
The Aion V Plus measures 4,650 mm (183 in) long, 1,920 mm (76 in) wide and 1,720 mm (68 in) tall with 2,830 mm (111 in) between the axles. The front bumper has become simpler, and Aion claims it drew inspiration from Star Wars characters to come up with the new design. For the interior, the digital dashboard and the touch-enabled infotainment system are separate from each other, and the infotainment display measures 15.6 inches diagonally.

==== Powertrain and range ====
Power of the Aion V Plus comes from three models of batteries rated from 70 to 95 kilowatt-hours, supporting an NEDC-rated range of 500 and 702 km (310–436 miles). All powertrain variants incorporate two electric motors, while total output ranges from 221 PS (218 hp / 163 kW) in the base spec to 271 PS (267 hp / 200 kW) in the top spec.

===== Rapid-charging battery =====
In late September 2021, GAC Aion officially launched a version of the Aion V Plus (previously Aion V) equipped with a battery that charges from 30% to 80% in 10 minutes. That corresponds to a 0–80% charging time of 16 minutes. The battery capacity is 72.3 kWh, and charging for just 5 minutes adds 112 km (70 mi) of range. The manufacturer refers to this version of the battery as SPEED+. Additionally, a battery version charging about twice as fast, called SPEED++, was also announced. In this case, charging for 5 minutes is expected to provide 207 km (129 mi) of range. A vehicle using this battery version was demonstrated but has not reached the market so far.

However, such charging speeds require an appropriate charging station. GAC Aion has demonstrated a charging station able to provide 480 kW of power (Aion's A480 supercharger), and announced that a network of such stations will be built in China; as of early October 2021 there is just one such station in Guangzhou.

The manufacturer says the Aion V is its first model to utilize "super multiplier battery technology". According to GAC Aion, the Aion V Plus is powered by the company's magazine battery, which is non-flammable in pinprick tests. The battery has a high life span and is capable of maintaining 95 percent capacity even after 1,600 cycles.

== Second generation (2024) ==
Second generation
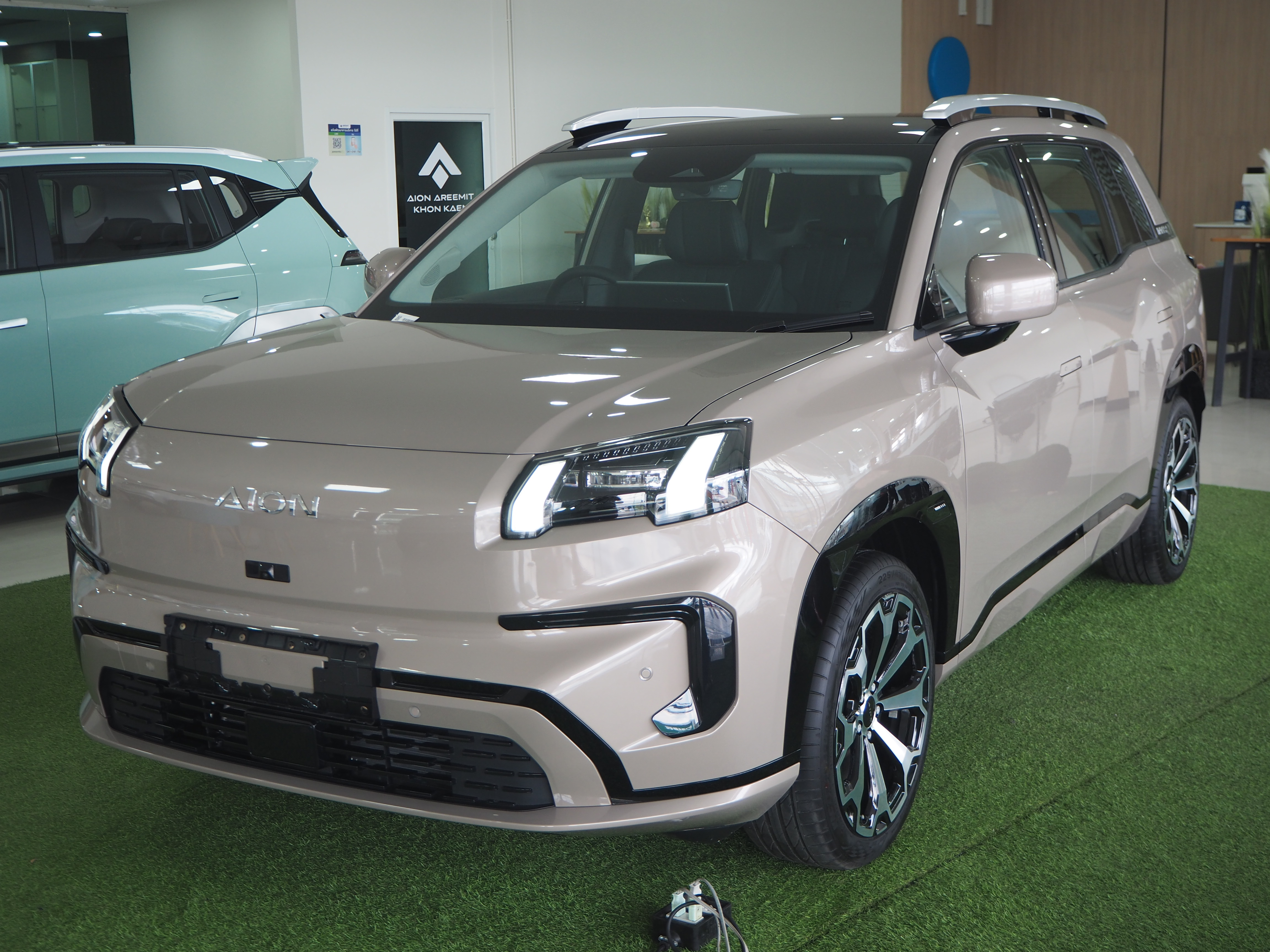

Overview
- Model code: AY5
- Production: 2024–present
- Assembly: China: Guangzhou; Thailand: Rayong (Aion Automobile Manufacturing (Thailand)); Indonesia: Purwakarta (National Assemblers); Austria: Graz (Magna Steyr); Pakistan: Karachi (GAC Lucky Motors)

Body and chassis
- Platform: AEP 3.0
- Related: Aion i60; Toyota bZ3X; Trumpchi GS4 (fifth generation)

Powertrain
- Electric motor: Permanent magnet synchronous
- Power output: 100–165 kW (134–221 hp)
- Battery: 62 kWh CATL LFP Magazine Battery 2.0; 64.5 kWh CATL LFP Magazine Battery 2.0 (Indonesia); 75 kWh CATL LFP Magazine Battery 2.0; 90 kWh CATL Lithium-Ternary (NMC) Magazine Battery 2.0
- Electric range: 520–750 km (323–466 mi) (CLTC); 480–710 km (298–441 mi) (NEDC); 485–510 km (301–317 mi) (WLTP)

Dimensions
- Wheelbase: 2,775 mm (109.3 in)
- Length: 4,605 mm (181.3 in)
- Width: 1,854 mm (73.0 in)
- Height: 1,686 mm (66.4 in)
- Curb weight: 1,780–1,880 kg (3,924–4,145 lb)

The second generation was debuted at the 2024 Beijing Auto Show, with Chinese market sales starting in July 2024. The model was designed as a global model with plans to expand overseas. In China, it is marketed as the Aion V 霸王龙 (pinyin: Bàwáng lóng; lit. 'Tyrannosaurus Rex').

It is based on the Architecture Electric Platform (AEP) 3.0 pure electric platform developed by GAC that features the first fully liquid-cooled electric drive and an AI cockpit using the ADiGO Sense AI model and ADiGO Pilot intelligent driving system powered by an Nvidia Orin X chip and a Lidar unit with 5 millimeter wavelength radars and cameras.

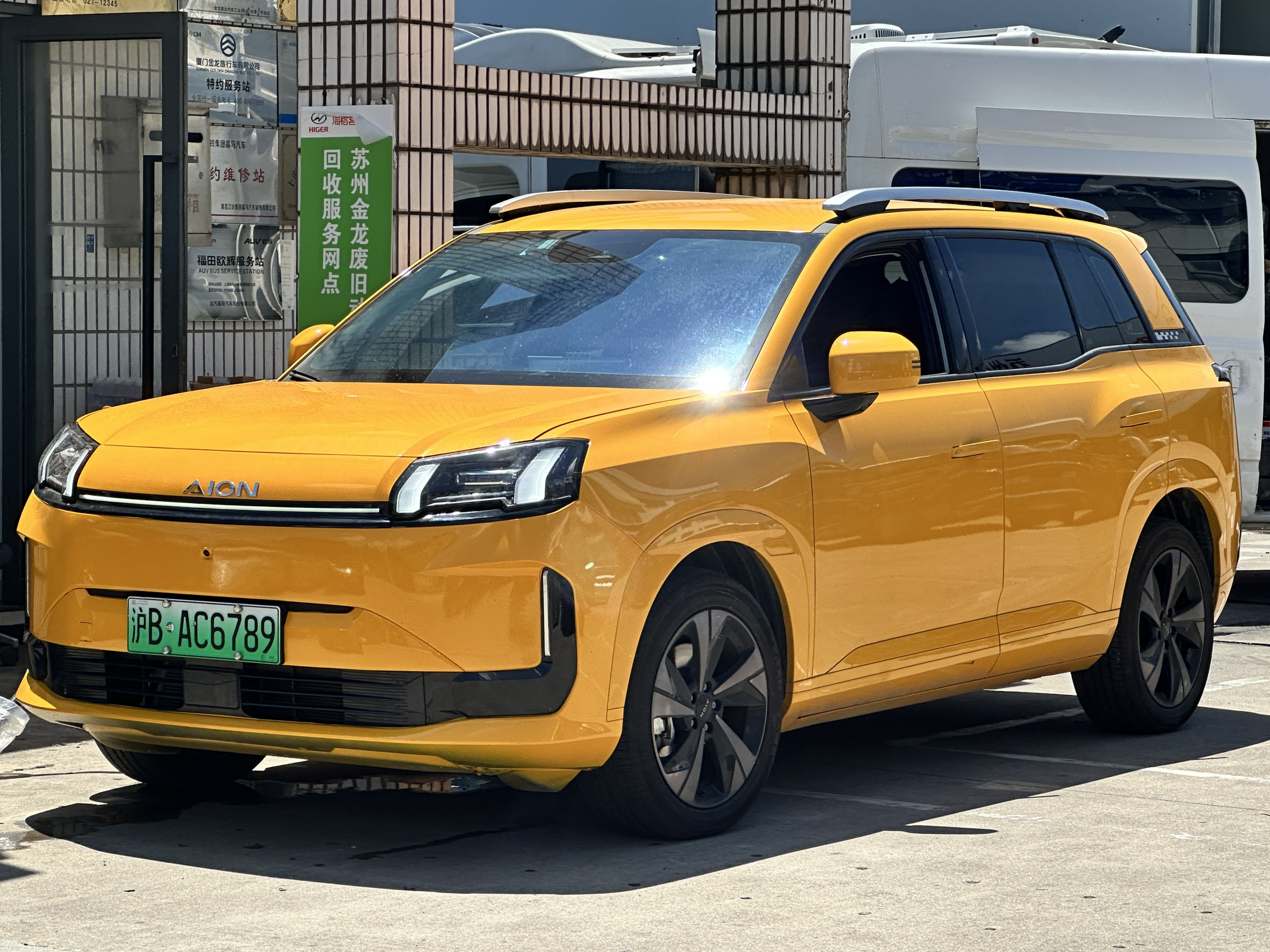
Aion V 2025 (facelift)

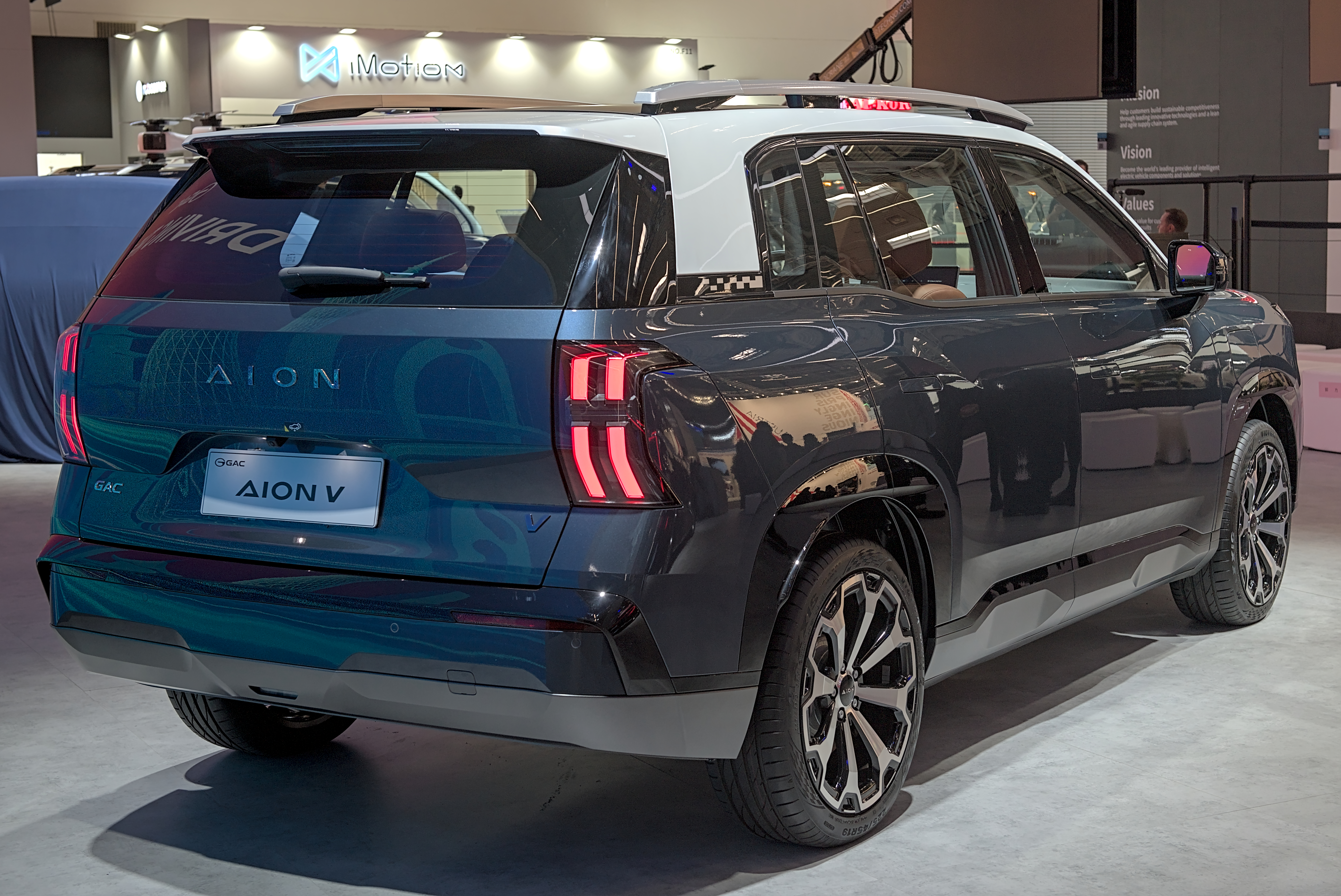
Rear view

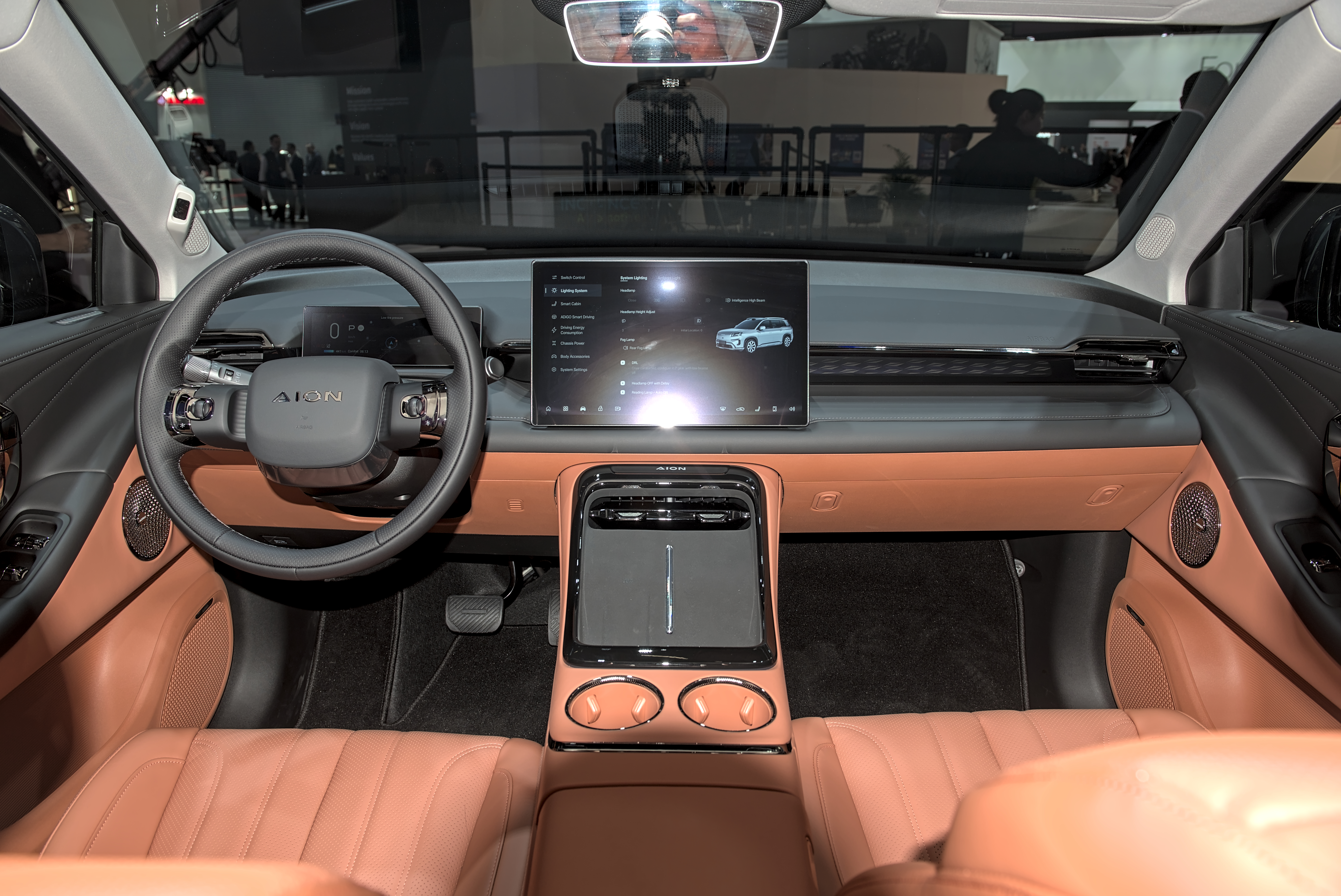
Interior

=== Aion i60 ===
In 2025, Aion launched the Aion i60, the EREV/BEV variant of Aion V.

It is available with both range-extended and battery electric powertrains. The EV version is equipped with an electric motor delivering a maximum power of 150 kW (201 hp; 204 PS) or 165 kW (221 hp; 224 PS).

The EREV version features a powertrain composed of a 1.5-litre range extender petrol engine with maximum power of 74 kW (99 hp; 101 PS). The electric motor is available with 150 kW (201 hp; 204 PS) or 165 kW (221 hp; 224 PS) option. It is equipped with a 29.165 kWh lithium iron phosphate battery pack, offering a WLTC pure electric range of 160 km (99 mi).

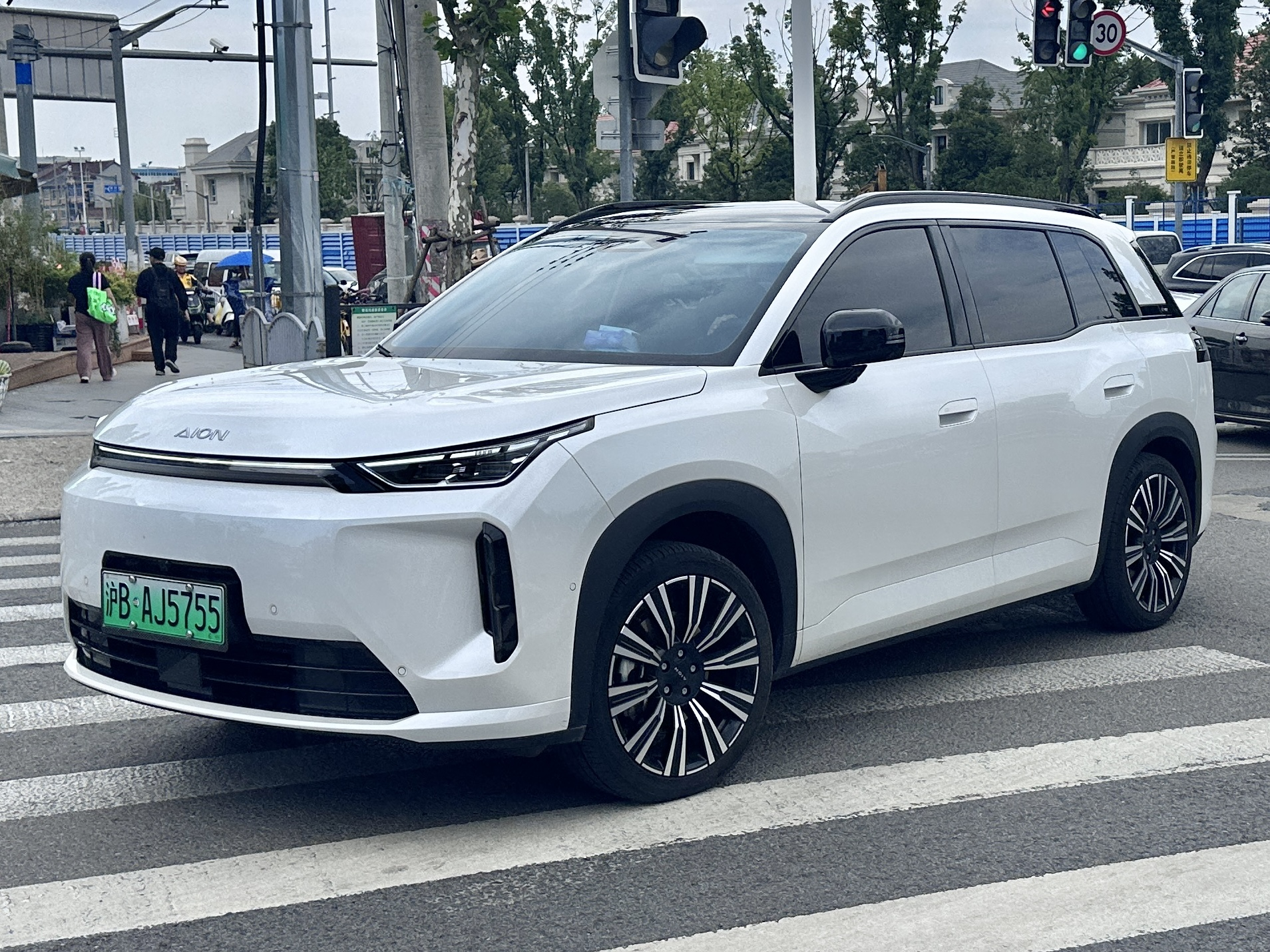
Aion i60

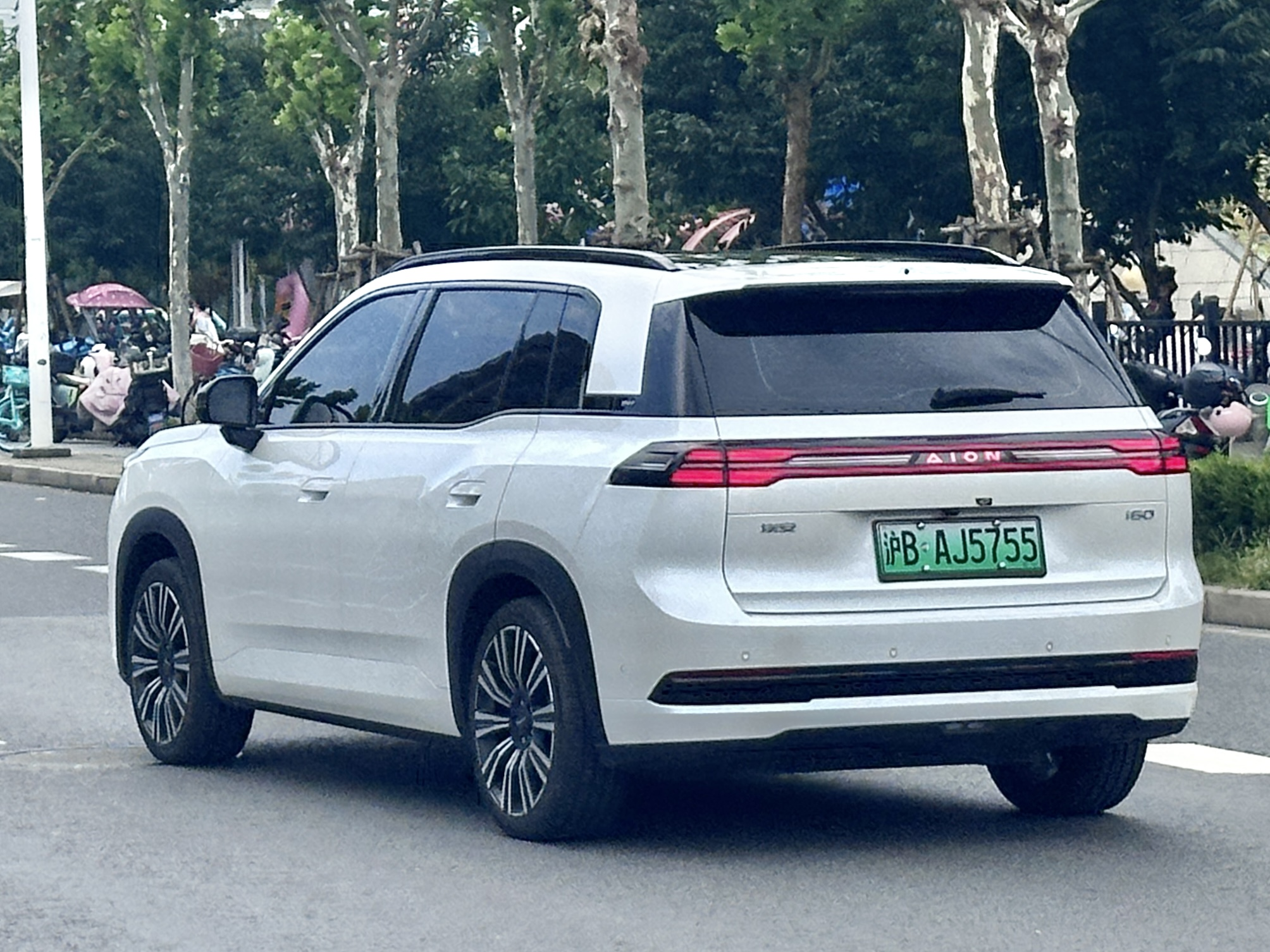
Rear view

=== Trumpchi GS4 ===
In May 2026, GAC revealed the fifth generation of Trumpchi GS4, which is ICE variant of second generation Aion V/i60

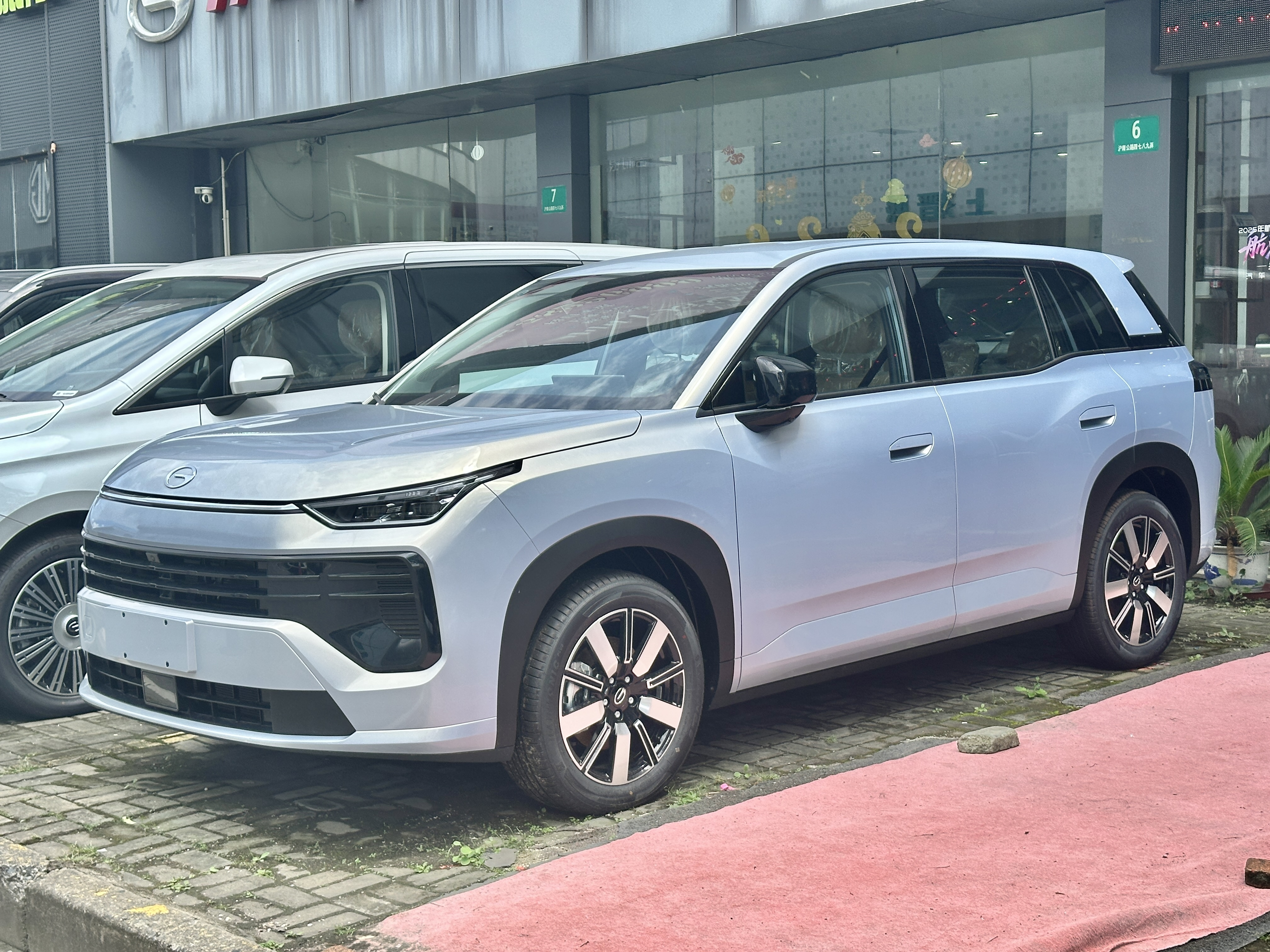
Trumpchi GS4

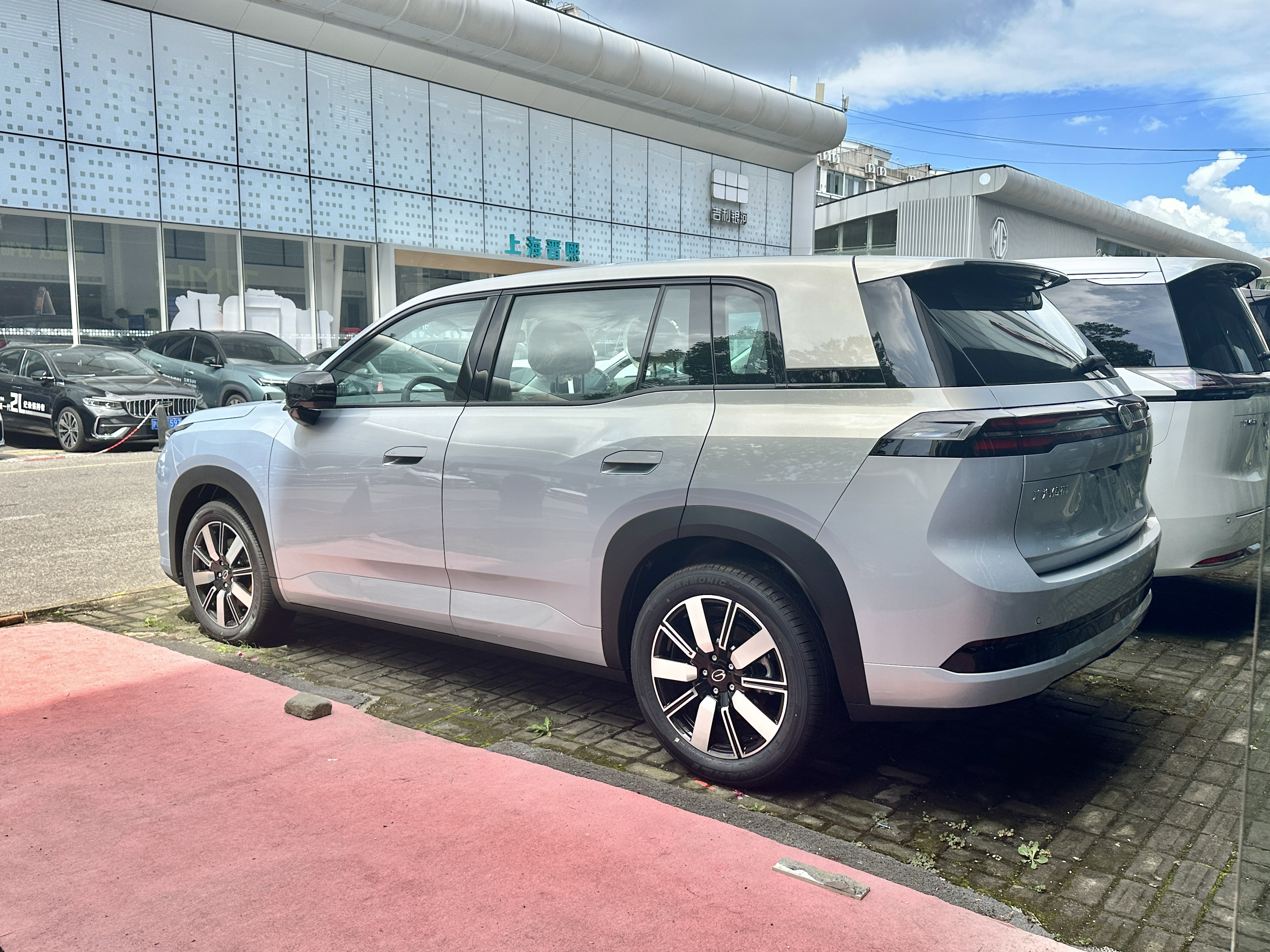
Rear view

=== Markets ===
==== Asia ====
===== Indonesia =====
The Aion V was introduced in Indonesia in November 2024 at the 2024 Gaikindo Jakarta Auto Week. Sales were commenced in February 2025 at the 32nd Indonesia International Motor Show. Locally assembled by Indomobil Group's subsidiary, National Assemblers, it is available in two variants: Exclusive (64.5 kWh) and Luxury (75.3 kWh).

===== Singapore =====
The Aion V was launched in Singapore on 27 February 2025, in the sole Luxury variant using the 75.3 kWh battery pack. The entry-level Premium variant using the 64.5 kWh battery pack was added in July 2025.

===== Thailand =====
The Aion V was launched in Thailand at the 41st Thailand International Motor Expo on 28 November 2024 in a sole variant; 602 Luxury (75.3 kWh). In March 2026, the 500 Premium (64.5 kWh) variant was added to the line-up.

==== Europe ====
The Aion V was introduced in Europe at the 2024 Paris Motor Show, as the first global strategic model from the GAC Group to be marketed in Europe. The Aion V was released in Europe in September 2025 with sales commenced in the same month in selected European markets, after its regional debut was delayed due to the uncertainty of the introduction of additional tariffs placed against Chinese-built battery electric vehicles by the European Union in October 2024. The European-market model uses the 75.3 kWh battery pack and comes standard with a heat pump and a built-in refrigerator that also supports a heating function.

==== Oceania ====
===== Australia =====
The Aion V was launched in Australia on 18 November 2025, as part of GAC's entry to Australia, with two variants: Premium and Luxury, both variants using the 75.3 kWh battery pack.

Euro NCAP test results Aion V Premium (LHD) (2025)
Test	Points	%
Overall:	5 /5 stars	
Adult occupant:	35.4	88%
Child occupant:	42.0	85%
Pedestrian:	50.0	79%
Safety assist:	14.1	78%

ANCAP test results GAC AION V (2025, aligned with Euro NCAP)
Test	Points	%
Overall:	5 /5 stars	
Adult occupant:	35.42	88%
Child occupant:	43	87%
Pedestrian:	50.05	79%
Safety assist:	14.32	79%

== Sales ==
Year	China	Thailand (Note: Figures based on registration (Thailand))	Indonesia
2020	11,173	—	—
2021	15,825	—	—
2022	31,824	—	—
2023	21,182	—	—
2024	36,001	—	—
2025	39,409	4,089	3,087
