= V (The Fucking Champs album) =

Studio album by The Fucking Champs
- Released: May 20, 2002
- Genres: Heavy metal, indie rock
- Length: 38:25
- Label: Drag City

The Fucking Champs chronology
IV (2000)	V (2002)	VI (2007)

Professional ratings
Review scores
Source	Rating
Allmusic	link
Pitchfork Media	8.1/10 link July 24, 2002
Stylus Magazine	B− link September 9, 2003

V is the fifth full-length album by San Francisco metal/indie group The Fucking Champs, released in 2002 on Drag City.

== Track listing ==
1. Never Enough Neck Pt. 1
2. Never Enough Neck Pt. 2
3. Children Perceive the Hoax Cluster
4. I Am The Album Cover
5. Nebula Ball Rests in a Fantasy Claw
6. The Virtues of Cruising
7. Aliens of Gold
8. Air on a G-String
9. Hats Off to Music
10. Major Airbro's Landing
11. Policenauts 2000
12. Crummy Lovers Die in the Grave
13. Part Three
14. Happy Segovia
15. Chorale Motherfucker
