= V for Vendetta (disambiguation) =

V for Vendetta is a British graphic novel written by Alan Moore and illustrated by David Lloyd and Tony Weare.

V for Vendetta may also refer to:

- V for Vendetta (film), a 2005 film directed by James McTeigue and written by the Wachowskis
  - V for Vendetta: Music from the Motion Picture, a 2006 soundtrack album by various artists
- V for Vendetta (TV series), an upcoming television series
- "V for Vendetta", an episode of the TV series 12 O'Clock High

== See also ==
- V (character), the titular protagonist of the comic book series V for Vendetta
- Guy Fawkes mask, also known as the V for Vendetta mask, a mask depicting Guy Fawkes
- "V" Is for Vengeance, a 2011 novel by Sue Grafton
