= List of Stanford GSB alumni =

This is a list of notable persons who are alumni of Stanford Graduate School of Business in Stanford, California.

== Alumni ==
=== Business ===
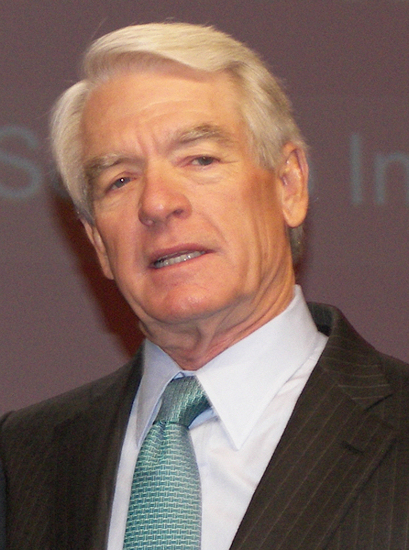
Charles R. Schwab, billionaire investor and founder, Charles Schwab Corporation

- Tatsuro Kiyohara, Japanese hedge fund manager
- Jon Abbott, President and CEO of WGBH Educational Foundation
- Stephen Adams, businessman and private equity investor
- Andrew Agwunobi, healthcare administrator and interim president of the University of Connecticut
- Javed Ahmed, Pakistani American businessman
- Herbert M. Allison, businessman, former president and CEO of Fannie Mae
- Mukesh Ambani, Billionaire Indian businessman chairman of Reliance industries
- Ime Archibong, Meta Platforms executive
- Steve Ballmer, Billionaire former CEO of Microsoft, owner of Los Angeles Clippers of the National Basketball Association (NBA)
- Mary Barra, Chairman and CEO of General Motors
- Robert Bass, billionaire businessman
- Sid Bass, investor and billionaire
- Riley P. Bechtel, former chairman of the Bechtel Corporation
- Stephen Bechtel Jr., billionaire co-owner of the Bechtel Corporation
- Jeffrey Bewkes, Chairman and CEO of Time Warner
- Roelof Botha, venture capitalist, Sequoia Capital global head
- Orlando Bravo, billionaire co-founder and managing partner of private equity firm Thoma Bravo
- Carlos Brito, CEO of Anheuser-Busch InBev
- Bill Browder, American-born British financier
- John Browne, Baron Browne of Madingley, British businessman
- Brook Byers, senior partner at Kleiner Perkins Caufield & Byers
- Tim Cadogan, CEO of GoFundMe, co-founder and former CEO of OpenX
- Bud Colligan, American entrepreneur
- James C. Collins, American business consultant, author, and lecturer
- Joe Coulombe, founder and CEO of Trader Joe’s
- James Coulter, billionaire co-founder of private equity firm TPG Capital
- Sir Howard Davies, Chairman of the Royal Bank of Scotland and the former Director of the London School of Economics
- John Donahoe, American businessman and former CEO of Nike, former president of ServiceNow and former CEO of Bain and Company and eBay
- Andy Dunn, American entrepreneur and CEO of Bonobos Inc.
- Richard Fairbank, American billionaire businessman and founder of Capital One
- Thomas J. Falk, CEO of Kimberly-Clark
- Anna Fang, venture capitalist, CEO of ZhenFund
- José Feliciano, co-founder and managing partner of Clearlake Capital
- Robert J. Fisher, American businessman
- Pete Flint, British entrepreneur
- Sarah Friar, CEO of Nextdoor and former CFO of Block (formerly Square)
- Marcos Galperin, billionaire Argentine businessman and co-founder of MercadoLibre, Inc.
- Dana Gioia, American poet and writer
- Seth Godin, American author and former dot com business executive
- Robert E. Grady, American venture capitalist and private equity investor
- Wyc Grousbeck, American businessman and owner of the Boston Celtics
- Rene Haas, American tech industry executive, CEO of Arm Ltd.
- Ole Andreas Halvorsen, billionaire Norwegian-born investor, hedge fund manager, and philanthropist
- Richard B. Handler, American businessman and CEO of Jeffries Group
- Tom Hayhoe, British healthcare figure
- Nathan Hubbard, American businessman and music executive
- Jessica Jackley, American entrepreneur and co-founder of Kiva
- Kenneth M. Jacobs, chairman and chief executive officer of Lazard
- Jeff Jordan, American venture capitalist at Andreessen Horowitz
- Jim Jorgensen, American entrepreneur
- Lynn Jurich, American businessperson and CEO of Sunrun
- Vinod Khosla, billionaire Indian American engineer and businessman
- Darren Kimura, American businessperson and inventor of Micro-Concentrating Solar
- Phil Knight, Billionaire Founder and Chairman of Nike
- Omid Kordestani, Iranian-born American businessman
- David Korten, American author and political activist
- Richard Kovacevich, American businessperson and former CEO of Wells Fargo & Company
- Gary Kremen, American entrepreneur and online dating entrepreneur
- Nisa Leung, Venture Capitalist
- Tom Linebarger, CEO of Cummins
- Edmund Wattis Littlefield, American businessman and philanthropist
- Stephen J. Luczo Executive Chairman of Seagate
- Mathew Martoma (born 1974 as Ajai Mathew Mariamdani Thomas), hedge fund portfolio manager, convicted of insider trading
- Sir Deryck Maughan, British businessman and philanthropist
- John B. McCoy, businessman
- Henry A. McKinnell, business executive and former CEO of Pfizer Inc.
- Scott McNealy, businessman and co-founder of Sun Microsystems
- Alex Michel, businessman and first star of The Bachelor
- Steve Miller, American businessman and chairman at AIG
- Hamid Moghadam, American businessman
- John Morgridge, American businessman
- Mariam Naficy, American entrepreneur and founder of Minted
- Jacqueline Novogratz, American entrepreneur and author
- Tom Peters, American writer on business management practices
- Donald Petersen, American businessman at Ford Motor Company
- David Pitt-Watson, Scottish author and businessperson
- Ken Powell, American businessman and CEO of General Mills
- Laurene Powell Jobs, billionaire widow of Apple, Inc. co-founder Steve Jobs
- Frank Quattrone, billionaire investment banker, founder of Qatalyst Partners
- Michele Raffin, American aviculturist
- Richard Rainwater, billionaire American investor and fund manager
- Charles R. Schwab, billionaire American investor and founder of the Charles Schwab Corporation
- Mayo A. Shattuck III, American businessman
- David Siminoff, American investor
- Ellen Siminoff, American investor
- Jeffrey Skoll, billionaire Canadian engineer, internet entrepreneur and film producer
- Steven Smith, American astronaut
- Thomas O. Staggs, former COO of the Walt Disney Company
- Tom Steyer, American billionaire hedge fund manager
- David Sze, entrepreneur, investor, and managing partner at the venture capital firm Greylock Partners
- Alan Tripp, American entrepreneur
- Kevin Tsujihara, American businessman and former chairman and CEO of Warner Bros. Entertainment
- Tristan Walker, American entrepreneur
- Miles D. White, American entrepreneur
- Sam Yagan, American entrepreneur and co-founder of OkCupid
- Lee Hsien Yang, Singaporean business executive
- Lorenzo Zambrano, Mexican businessman

=== Government ===
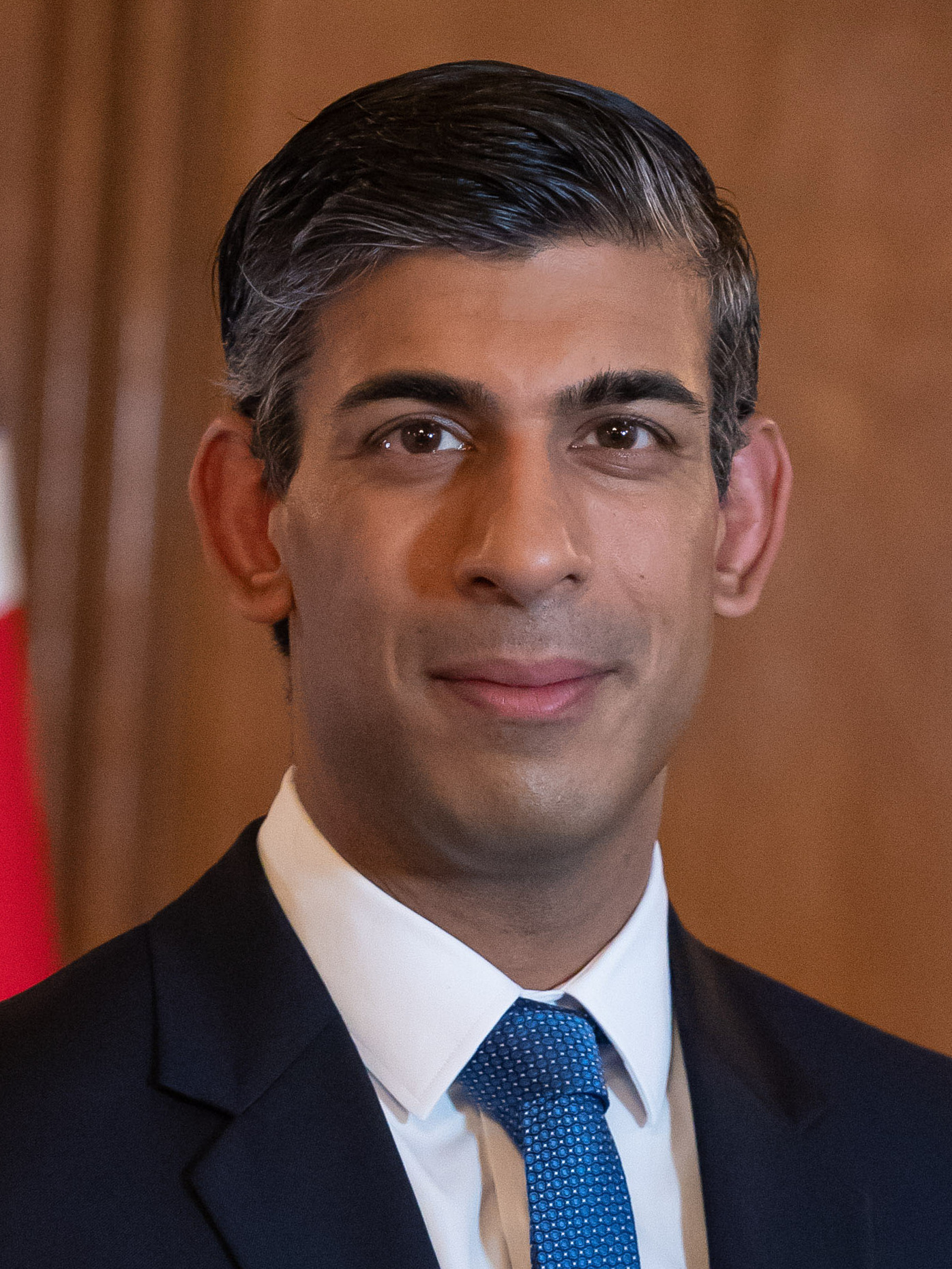
Rishi Sunak, former Prime Minister of the United Kingdom

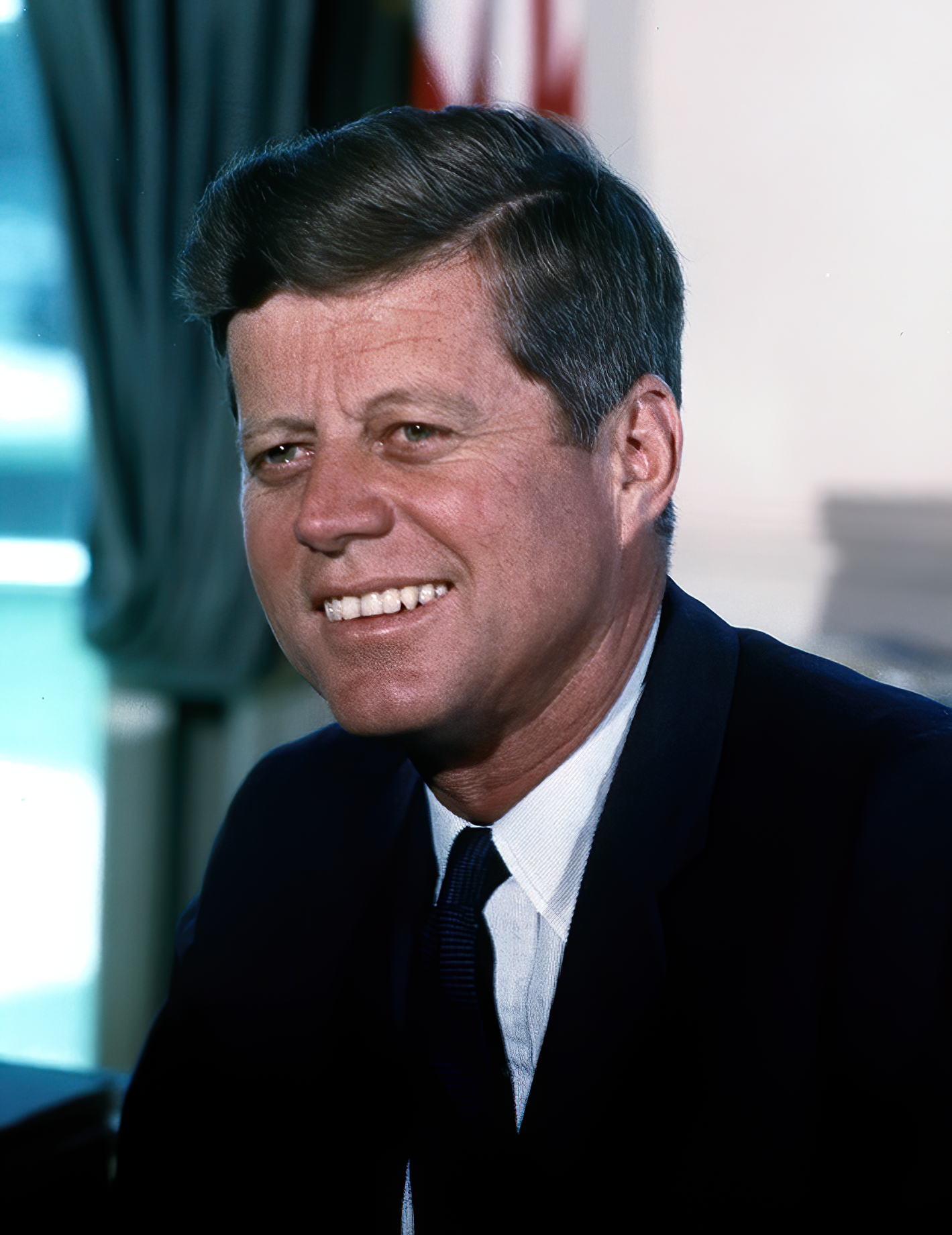
John F. Kennedy, 35th President of the United States

- Doug Burgum, 55th United States Secretary of the Interior (2025–present)
- Anthony Gonzalez, American football wide receiver and member of Congress
- John F. Kennedy, 35th President of the United States
- Jim Kolbe, American politician and member of Congress
- Nara Lokesh, Indian politician
- Woody Myers, Indiana state health commissioner
- Penny Pritzker, American billionaire businesswoman and United States Secretary of Commerce (2013–2017), member of the Pritzker family
- Lim Swee Say, Singaporean politician
- Jyotiraditya Scindia, Indian politician, titular maharaja of Gwalior State
- Rishi Sunak, Prime Minister of the United Kingdom (2022–2024)
- Steve Westly, American venture capitalist and California State Controller (2003–2007)
- Dennis Yao, former member of the Federal Trade Commission (FTC)
- Hidehiko Yuzaki, Japanese politician

=== Literature and the arts ===
- Victoria Chang, poet and writer

=== Military ===
- Paul Bucha, American war veteran
- Antonio Buehler, American war veteran and activist for the right to film the police

=== Science, technology and medicine ===
- Bruce Y. Lee, physician, public health informatician, medical academic and journalist
