= Aion N60 =

Battery electric compact crossover SUV

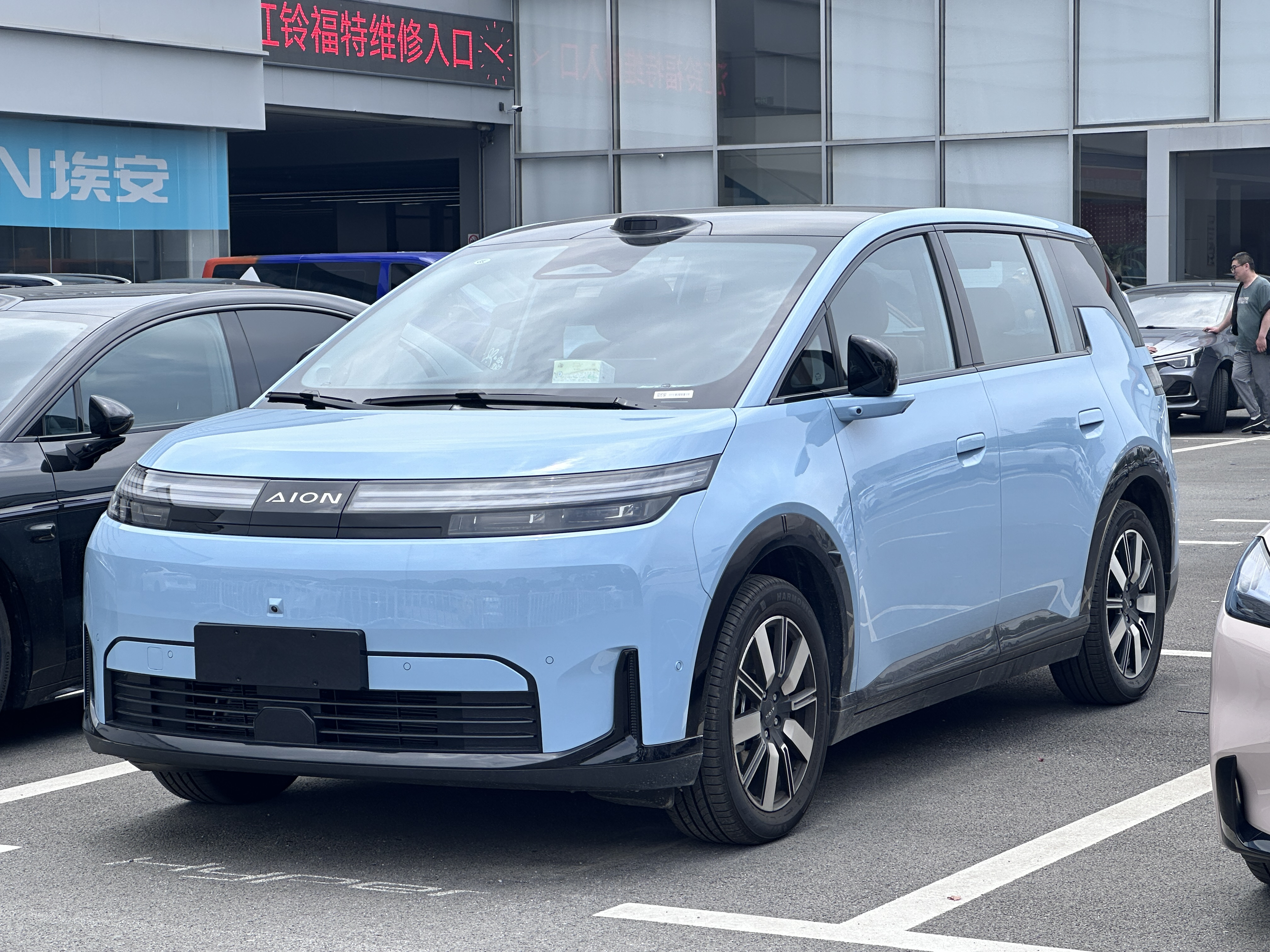

Overview
- Manufacturer: GAC Aion
- Production: April 2026 – present
- Assembly: China: Guangzhou
- Designer: Lu Minghao; Benoit Jacob

Body and chassis
- Class: Compact crossover SUV (C)
- Body style: 5-door SUV
- Layout: Front-motor, front-wheel-drive
- Platform: GAC Aion AEP 3.0

Powertrain
- Power output: 165 kW (224 PS; 221 hp)
- Battery: 45.58 kWh LFP; 57.43 kWh LFP; 69.75 kWh LFP
- Electric range: 410 km (255 mi) (CLTC); 510 km (317 mi) (CLTC); 610 km (379 mi) (CLTC)

Dimensions
- Wheelbase: 2,775 mm (109.3 in)
- Length: 4,615 mm (181.7 in)
- Width: 1,883 mm (74.1 in)
- Height: 1,673 mm (65.9 in)
- Curb weight: 1,545–1,765 kg (3,406–3,891 lb)

Chronology
- Predecessor: Aion Y

The Aion N60 is a battery electric compact crossover SUV produced by GAC Aion since April 2026.

== History ==
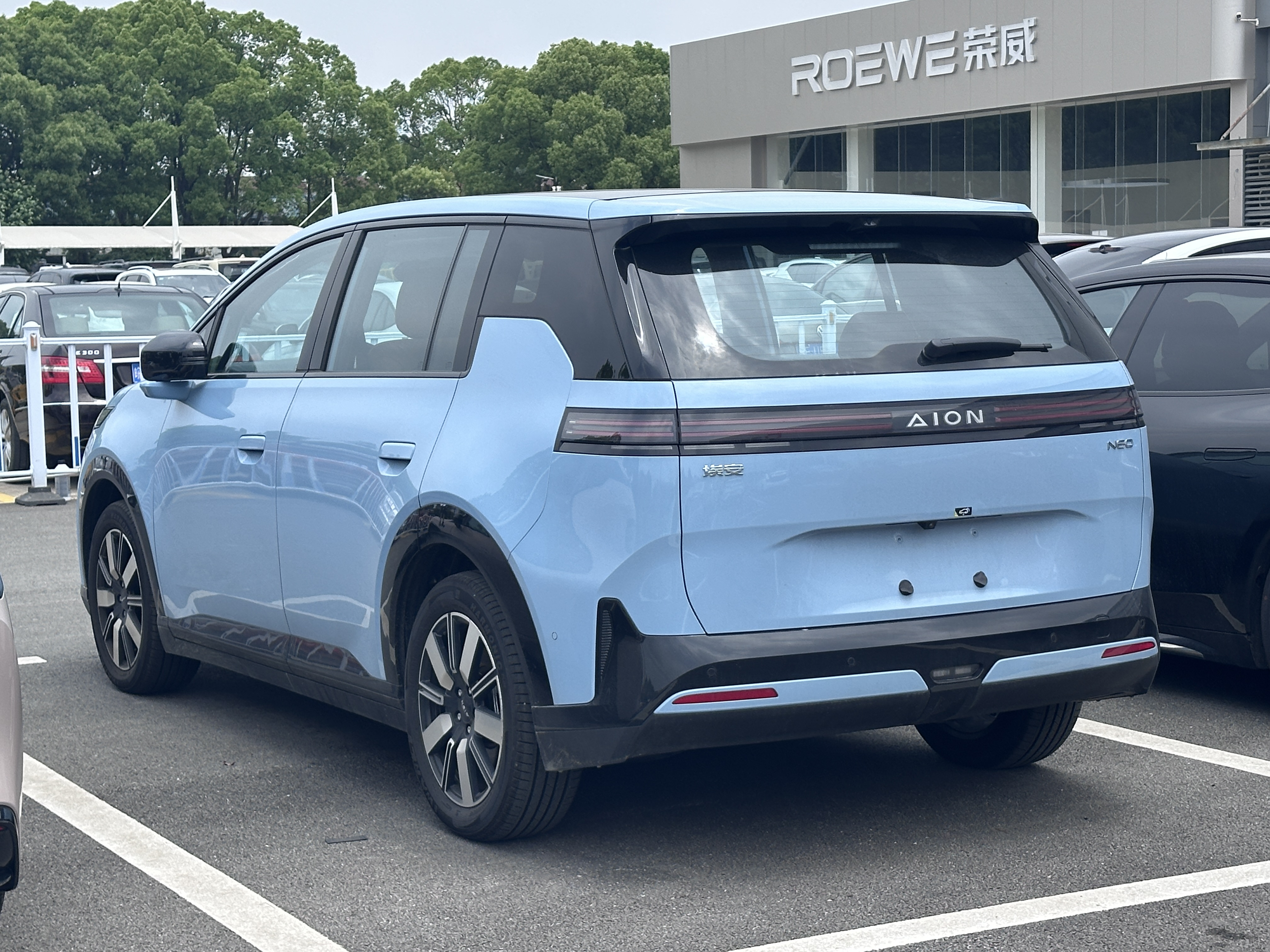
Rear view

The N60 was unveiled on 28 April 2026, following a pre-sales phase that opened on 16 April 2026 after an initial period of pre-ordering.

The design sketches of the N60 were first published in January 2026, revealing the involvement of Benoit Jacob, a former BMW designer credited with work on the BMW i3 and BMW i8. GAC Aion subsequently filed regulatory documents for a battery-swap-compatible variant of the N60 with Chinese authorities, positioning the model to complement the automaker's existing swap-enabled lineup, which includes the Aion RT and Aion UT Super. The swap-compatible N60 is intended primarily for ride-hailing fleet operators, mirroring the market positioning of the RT sedan.

=== Design and equipment ===
The exterior is characterised by a through-type front light bar integrating dual LED daytime running lights, rectangular headlamps, and an illuminated brand logo. At launch, the model was offered in seven exterior colours: Star Ring Silver, Soft Gold, Clear Sky Blue, Polar White, Night Shadow Black, Cloud Grey, and Sea Glow Grey.

The interior is built around a 15.6-inch and 2.5K-resolution central touchscreen paired with GAC's ADiGO 6.0 cockpit software, which incorporates artificial-intelligence voice control, integration with Huawei's Nebula Space ecosystem, and connectivity support for both Apple and Android devices. A zero-gravity front passenger seat is fitted as standard equipment across all trim levels.

== Powertrain ==
The N60 uses a single front-mounted electric motor built around an amorphous-alloy silicon carbide drive unit, producing a maximum output of 165 kW (224 PS; 221 hp) and a claimed energy consumption of 11.7 kWh per 100 km. Depending on battery specification, the N60 accelerates from 0–100 km/h (0–62 mph) in either 7.9 or 8.5 seconds. The chassis uses a five-link independent rear suspension.

Three trim levels are offered, differentiated by battery capacity, using GAC Aion second-generation "Magazine Battery" LFP cell technology. Claimed CLTC range varies by trim at 410 km (255 mi), 510 km (317 mi), and 610 km (379 mi). A battery-swap-compatible version was filed separately with regulators and is expected to follow the standard range.

== Driver assistance ==
The N60 variants come standard with a lidar sensor and a high-level advanced driver-assistance system (ADAS). The system, designated WRD 3.0, is supplied by WeRide and covers urban roads, highways, and parking scenarios, alongside active and passive safety functions. It is deployed on a Qualcomm SA8650 compute platform.
