= WeRide =

Autonomous driving technology company

WeRide Inc.
- Type: Public
- Traded as: Nasdaq: WRD; SEHK: 800
- Industry: Autonomous vehicles
- Founded: 2017; 9 years ago
- Founder: Tony Han
- Headquarters: Guangzhou, China
- Key people: Tony Han (CEO), Yan Li (CTO)
- Website: www.weride.ai

WeRide Inc. (Chinese: 文远知行) is an autonomous driving technology company. It holds driverless permits in 9 countries including China, the US, the UAE, Saudi Arabia, Belgium, Switzerland, Singapore, Spain and France. Its autonomous vehicles have been deployed across more than 60 cities in 13 countries.

== History ==
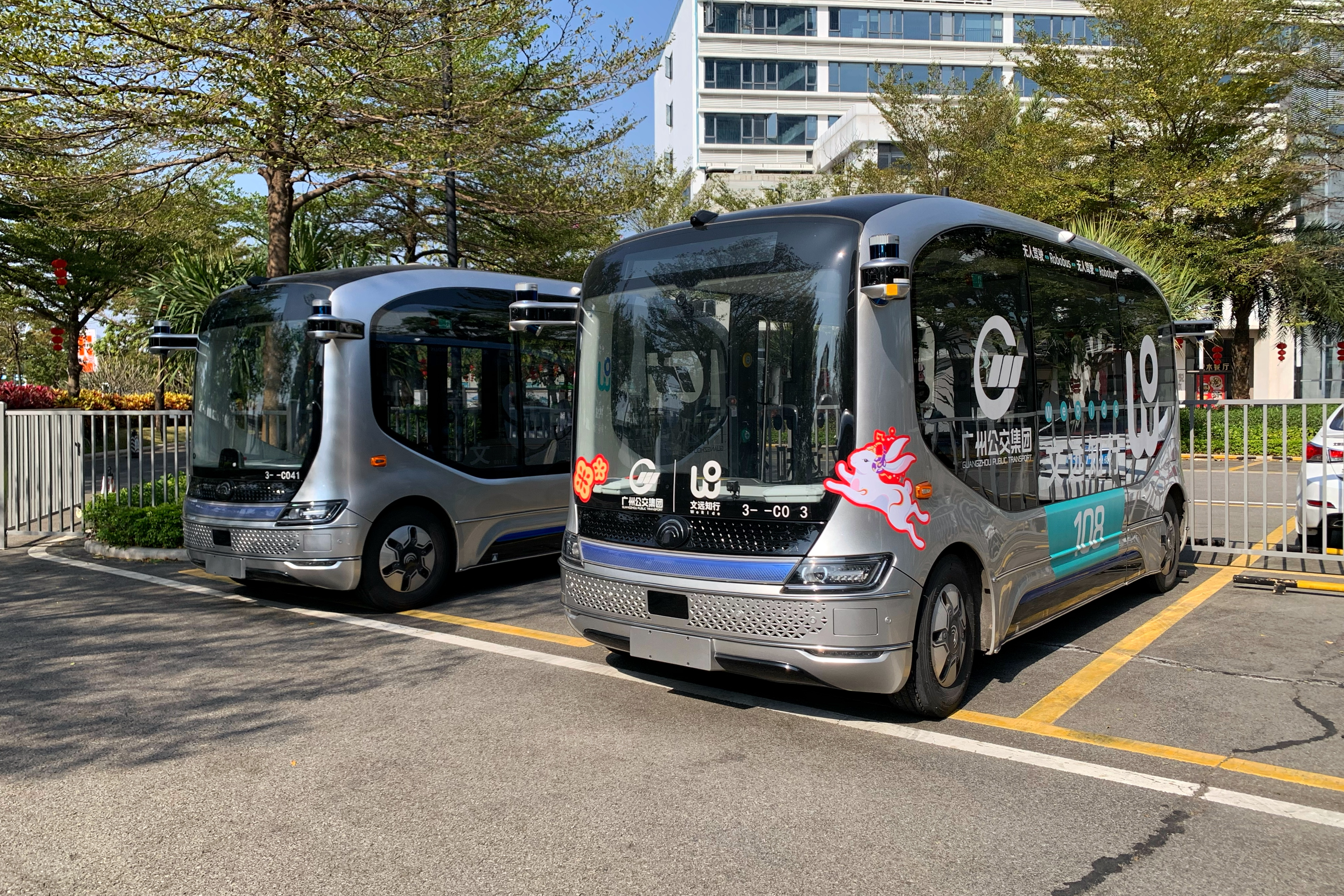
WeRide Mini Robobus in Guangzhou

WeRide was established in Silicon Valley in 2017, by Tony Han who was the former Chief Scientist of Baidu's Autonomous Driving Unit. It currently has offices in San Jose, Abu Dhabi, Singapore, Guangzhou, Beijing, Shanghai and Shenzhen. As of 2025, it has over 2000 employees.

In November 2020, WeRide announced that a total of 147,128 trips were completed for more than 60,000 passengers during its first year of Robotaxi service. In January 2021, WeRide unveiled the Mini Robobus.

In April 2021, WeRide obtained a driverless test permit in California. In September 2021, WeRide created a self driving cargo van, entitled the WeRide Robovan. In December 2021, WeRide completed an autonomous taxi trial on Yas Island in the UAE, by partnering with Bayanat.

In May 2022, WeRide partnered with Bosch to jointly develop Advanced driver-assistance systems (ADAS) software solution. In September, WeRide began its operations in Singapore and later entered into an agreement with Strides, a subsidiary of Singapore's public transport operator SMRT Corporation.

In January 2023, WeRide launched a new generation of autonomous driving sensor suite, WeRide Sensor Suite 5.1, at the 2023 International Consumer Electronics Show (CES). In 2023, WeRide was granted the UAE's first approved national license for self-driving vehicles on the country's roads. In December, WeRide obtained the Milestone Testing Regime Level 1 License (M1 License) for Autonomous Vehicles (AV) on Public Roads and the T1 Assessment License (T1 License) for AVs on Public Paths (T1 License) from the Land Transport Authority (LTA) of Singapore. In April 2024, WeRide launched its autonomous driving sanitation, the Robosweeper S1. In May, the company announced its partnership with Renault Group. In June, WeRide partnered with Chye Thiam Maintenance (CTM), a sanitation company in Singapore, to jointly advance WeRide Robosweeper in Singapore.

In the same month, WeRide and Uber announced a strategic partnership to bring WeRide’s autonomous vehicles to the Uber platform, starting in the UAE. The service first launched in Abu Dhabi, with select WeRide vehicles available via the Uber app. WeRide already operates a robotaxi fleet in the UAE.

Also in October 2024, WeRide filed for an initial public offering on Nasdaq, raising $439.9 million, and was subsequently listed under the ticker symbol WRD. Making it the first publicly listed universal autonomous driving company and the first publicly listed Robotaxi company.

In January 2025, the company became part of a project funded by the Canton of Zurich and the Swiss national railway Schweizerische Bundesbahnen (SBB). In February, WeRide launched its Robovan W5.

In February 2025, WeRide announced its first European fully driverless Robobus as part of a shuttle service partnership with beti, Renault Group, and Macif that featured an L4-level automated mobility service in Drôme, France. The company also launched the Robotaxi model GXR in Beijing.

In March 2025, it was reported that WeRide earlier on during the year had submitted a formal application to the Hong Kong Stock Exchange for a secondary listing.

== Services ==
=== Robotaxis ===
Service areas
Country	City	Status	Launch date	Ref.
China	Beijing	Full commercial service	November 17, 2023	
China	Guangzhou	Full commercial service	May 14, 2025	
China	Ordos	Full commercial service	November 15, 2023	
China	Shanghai	Full commercial service	July 26, 2025	
China	Suzhou	Service announced	—	
Saudi Arabia	Riyadh	Safety-driver service	–	
Slovakia	Bratislava	Service announced	—	
Spain	Madrid	Service announced	—	
Switzerland	Zurich	Service announced	2026	
United Arab Emirates	Abu Dhabi	Full commercial service	November 26, 2025	
United Arab Emirates	Dubai	Full commercial service	April 2, 2026	
United Arab Emirates	Ras Al Khaimah	Service announced	—	

=== Robobuses ===
Country	City	Status	Launch date	Ref.
Belgium	Leuven	Full commercial service	September 11, 2025	

== Financing ==
In September 2017, WeRide completed a $52 million pre-A round led by Qiming Venture Partners, Sinovation Ventures, Nvidia and others.

In October 2018, WeRide closed its Series A funding round, with Renault-Nissan-Mitsubishi Alliance as the lead investor.

In January 2021, the company raised $310 million in Series a B round after completing Series B2 and B3. It raised $200 million from Yutong Group, the lead investor on the deal. Qiming Venture Partners, Sinovation Ventures and Kinzon Capital, who were involved in the previous rounds, also participated in the funding.

In May 2021, WeRide closed a $310 million Series C round at a $3.3 billion valuation, invested by IDG Capital, Hechuang Investment, CoStone Capital, Cypress Star, Sky9 Capital, and K3 Ventures. Some institutes involved in WeRide's previous funding rounds, such as CMC Capital, Qiming Venture Partners, and AlpView Capital are also among the investor list. In December 2021, WeRide received strategic investment from GAC Group.

In January 2022, WeRide completed series D funding round, jointly invested led by a China-UAE joint sovereign fund, Asia Investment Capital, Bosch, GAC Group, and Carlyle Investment Group, raising the company’s valuation to $4.4 billion. In November 2022, WeRide completed a series D+ financing round, with China Development Bank Capital leading the investment. The post-investment valuation was $5.1 billion.

In October 2023, WeRide filed for a $119.4 million IPO on Nasdaq and a $320.5 million private placement. The company planned to offer 6.5 million shares as part of the listing.
