= Hyptec HL =

Battery electric full-size SUV

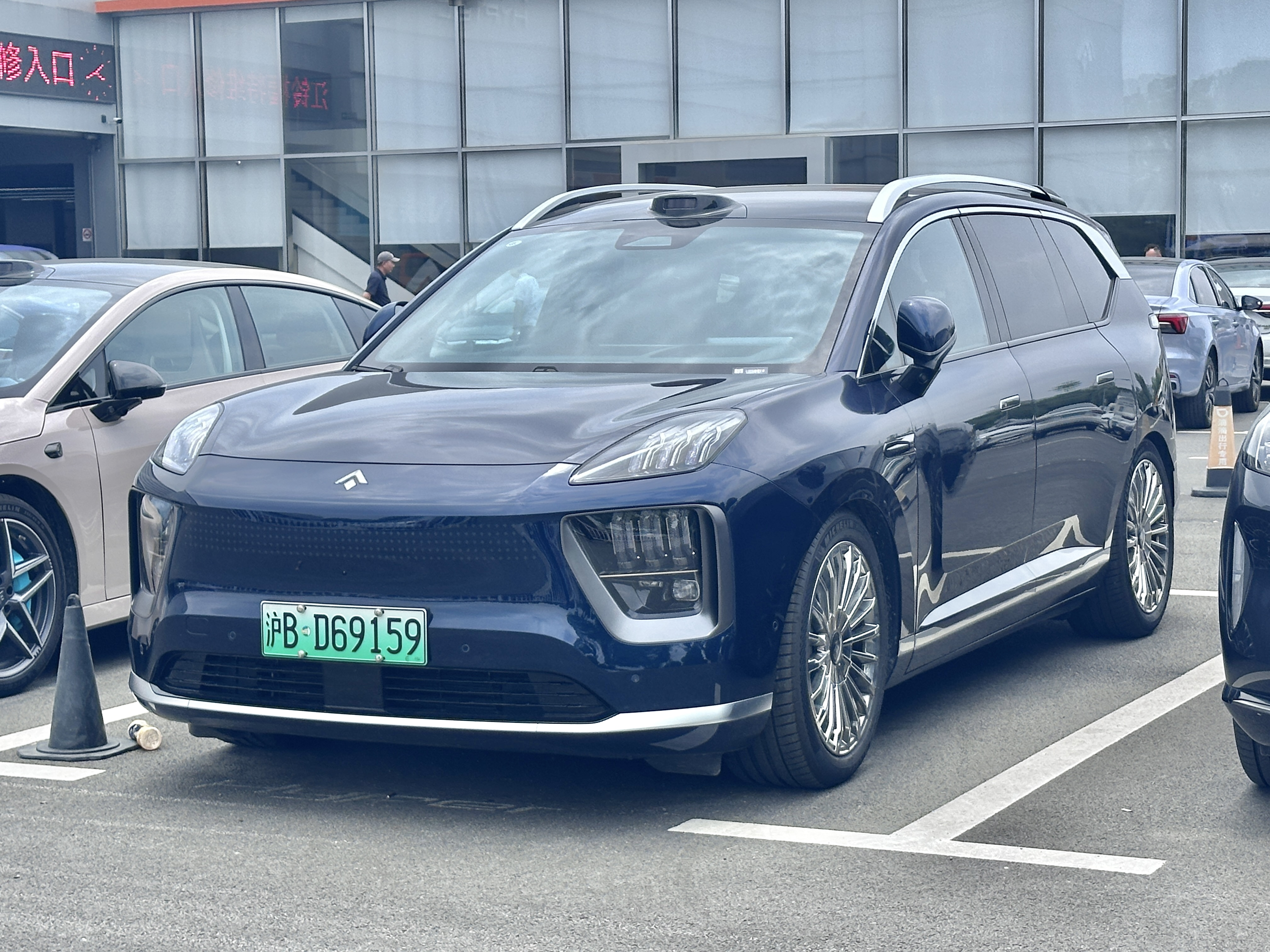

Overview
- Manufacturer: GAC Aion
- Model code: AH8
- Production: April 2025 – present
- Assembly: China: Guangzhou

Body and chassis
- Class: Full-size SUV (E)
- Body style: 5-door SUV
- Layout: Rear-motor, rear-wheel-drive; Dual-motor, all-wheel-drive; Front-engine, rear-motor, rear-wheel-drive (EREV)
- Platform: AEP 3.0

Powertrain
- Engine: 1.5 L 4A15J2 turbo I4
- Electric motor: 1x or 2x permanent magnet motor
- Power output: 250 kW (340 PS; 335 hp) (EV RWD, EREV); 280 kW (381 PS; 375 hp) (EV AWD)
- Hybrid drivetrain: Series hybrid / EREV / PHEV
- Battery: 60.33 kWh NMC CATL; 95.9 kWh NMC CALB; 108.35 kWh NMC CALB
- Range: 1,200 km (750 mi) (EREV)
- Electric range: 670–750 km (420–470 mi) (EV); 282 km (175 mi) (EREV)

Dimensions
- Wheelbase: 3,088 mm (121.6 in)
- Length: 5,126 mm (201.8 in)
- Width: 1,990 mm (78 in)
- Height: 1,730 mm (68 in)

The Hyptec HL (Chinese: 广汽昊铂HL; pinyin: Guǎngqì Hàobó HL) is a battery electric full-size SUV produced by Chinese automobile manufacturer GAC Aion a subsidiary of GAC Group and sold under the Hyptec marque since 2025.

== Overview ==
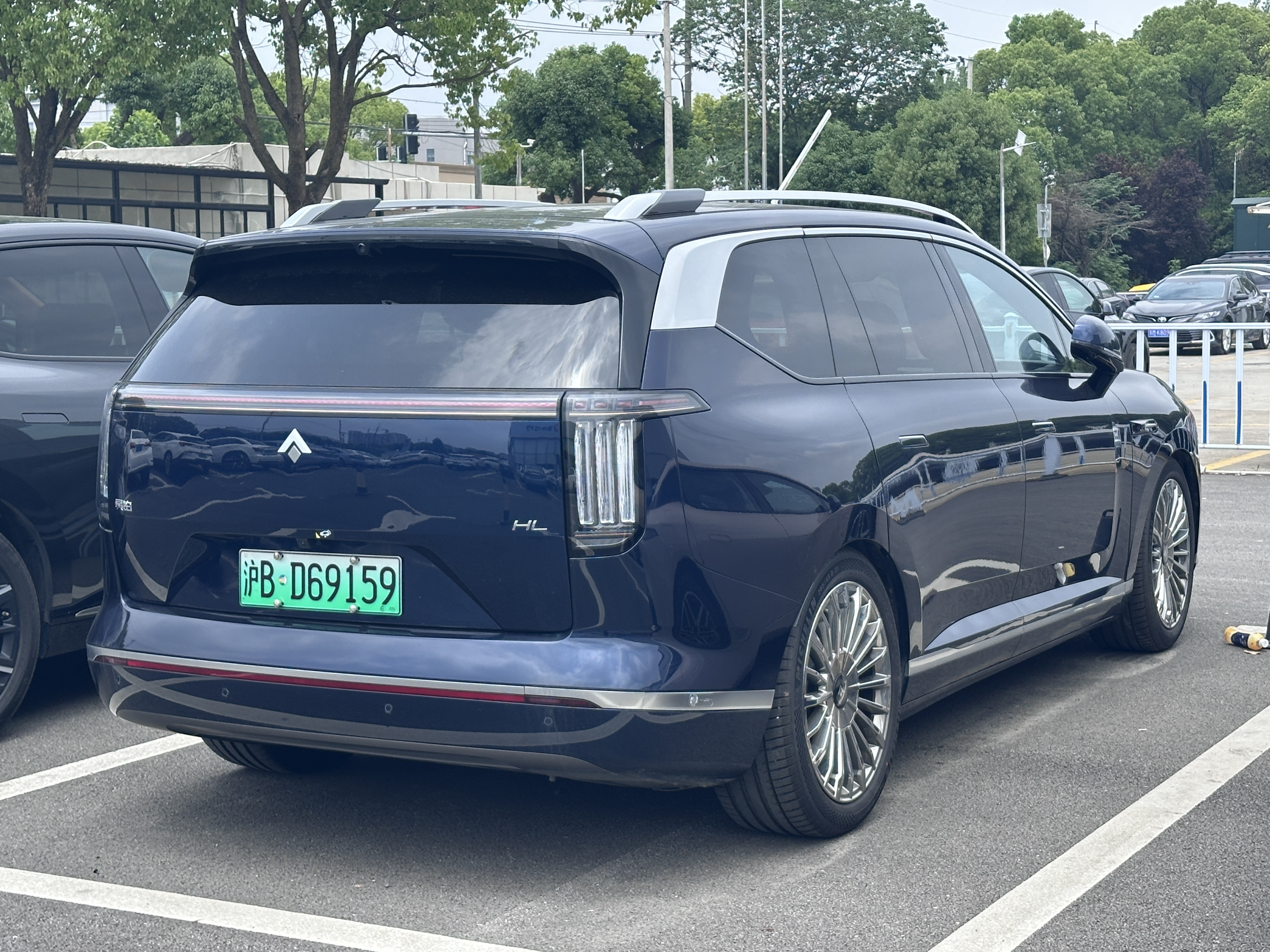
Rear view

Interior

The Hyptec HL, initially known by its codename AH8, was first announced in July 2021 as a model jointly-developed between GAC and Huawei. Huawei eventually backed out of the project, and the vehicle will continue to be produced by GAC Aion and sold under the newly-created Hyptec marque. The Hyptec HL was revealed at Auto Guangzhou in November 2024, alongside the Aion UT subcompact hatchback. Pre-sales of the HL began in March 2025, with deliveries of the EV version beginning in April. Deliveries of the EREV version are expected to start in August 2025.

The HL is equipped with air suspension and a choice of 20 or 21-inch wheels.

The interior features a high-mounted digital instrument cluster behind the steering wheel supplemented by a head-up display, along with a 17.3-inch infotainment display on the center of the dashboard. It has a three rows of two seats each, for a total of six seats. The second row seats have fixed armrests, an 18-point massage function, and 12-way power adjustment, enabling a 127.5-degree recline 'zero-gravity' mode. The interior is upholstered in Nappa leather, and all four doors have a power closing function.

== Powertrain ==
The HL is available in either a fully electric or range extender powertrains, using an 800 V electronic architecture which allows for 5C DC charging. The fully electric version has a 250 kW (340 hp; 340 PS) motor and a CLTC range rating of 750 kilometres (470 mi). The range extender version has an electric range of 350 kilometres (220 mi) and a combined range of over 1,200 kilometres (750 mi).

== Sales ==
Year	China		
Year	EV	EREV	Total
2025	2,052	1,869	3,921
