= Aion Y =

Battery electric compact crossover SUV

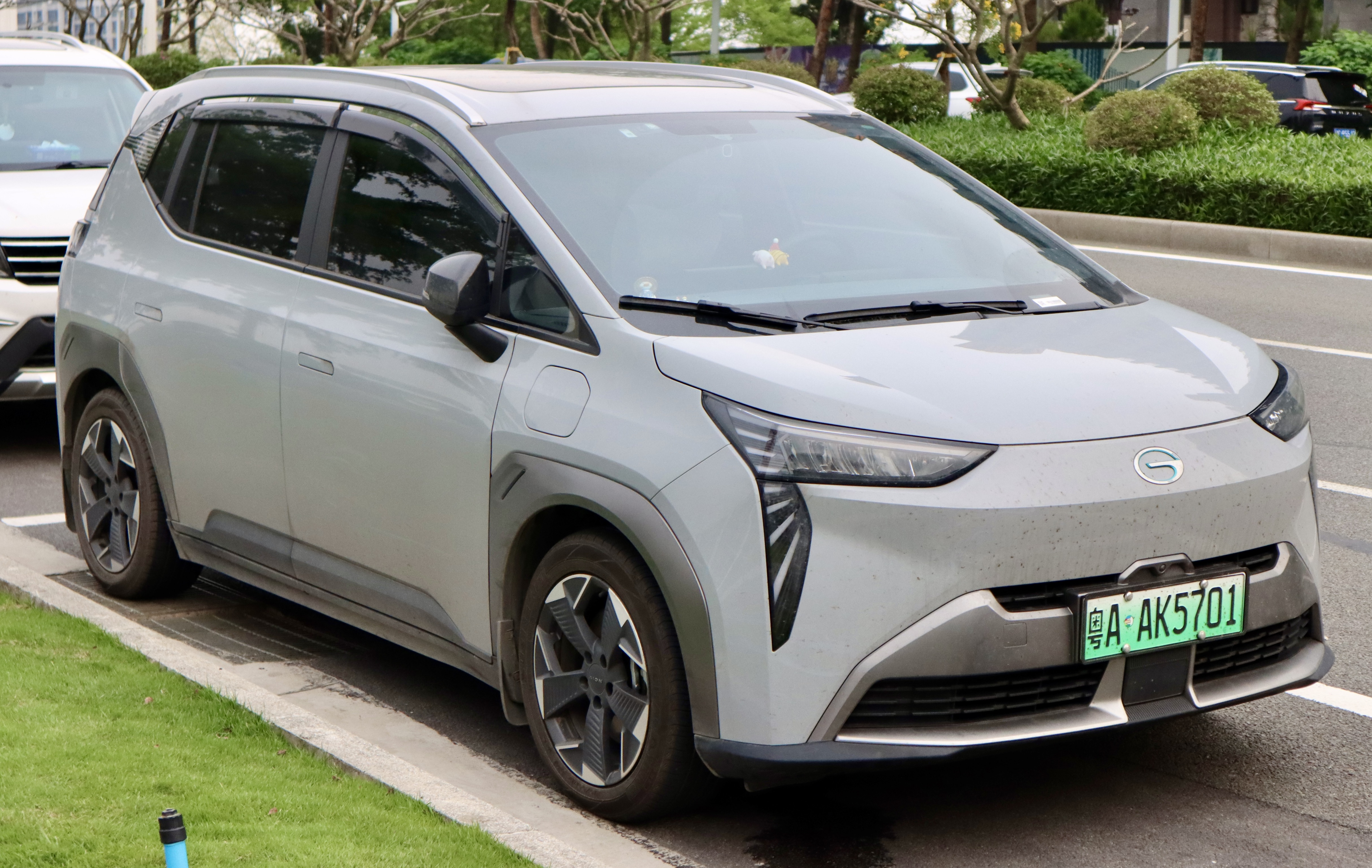
- Aion Y

Overview
- Manufacturer: GAC Aion
- Also called: Hycan Z03; Elaris Leo/Lenn (Germany); UMO 5 (Russia)
- Production: 2021–present 2021–2025 (Hycan Z03)
- Assembly: China: Guangzhou; Thailand: Rayong; Indonesia: Purwakarta (National Assemblers)
- Designer: Mehtap Topçu

Body and chassis
- Class: Compact crossover SUV (C)
- Body style: 5-door SUV
- Layout: Front-motor, front-wheel-drive
- Platform: Architecture Electric Platform 3.0

Powertrain
- Electric motor: Permanent-magnet synchronous motor
- Power output: 70–150 kW (95–204 PS; 94–201 hp)
- Battery: 37.9 – 68.2 kWh LFP; 59 – 76.8 kWh NMC
- Electric range: 460–600 km (286–373 mi); 410–610 km (255–379 mi) (Y Plus)

Dimensions
- Wheelbase: 2,750 mm (108.3 in); 2,775 mm (109.3 in) (N60)
- Length: 4,410 mm (173.6 in) (Y); 4,535 mm (178.5 in) (Y Plus); 4,615 mm (181.7 in) (N60)
- Width: 1,870 mm (73.6 in)
- Height: 1,645 mm (64.8 in) (Y); 1,650 mm (65.0 in) (Y Plus); 1,673 mm (65.9 in) (N60)
- Curb weight: 1,545–1,765 kg (3,406–3,891 lb)

Chronology
- Predecessor: Trumpchi GE3
- Successor: Aion N60 (China)

The Aion Y is a battery electric compact crossover SUV produced by GAC Aion since 2021. It was revealed as a concept at Auto Guangzhou in November 2020. The successor was the Aion N60 introduced in 2026 featuring battery swapping capabilities.

== Overview ==
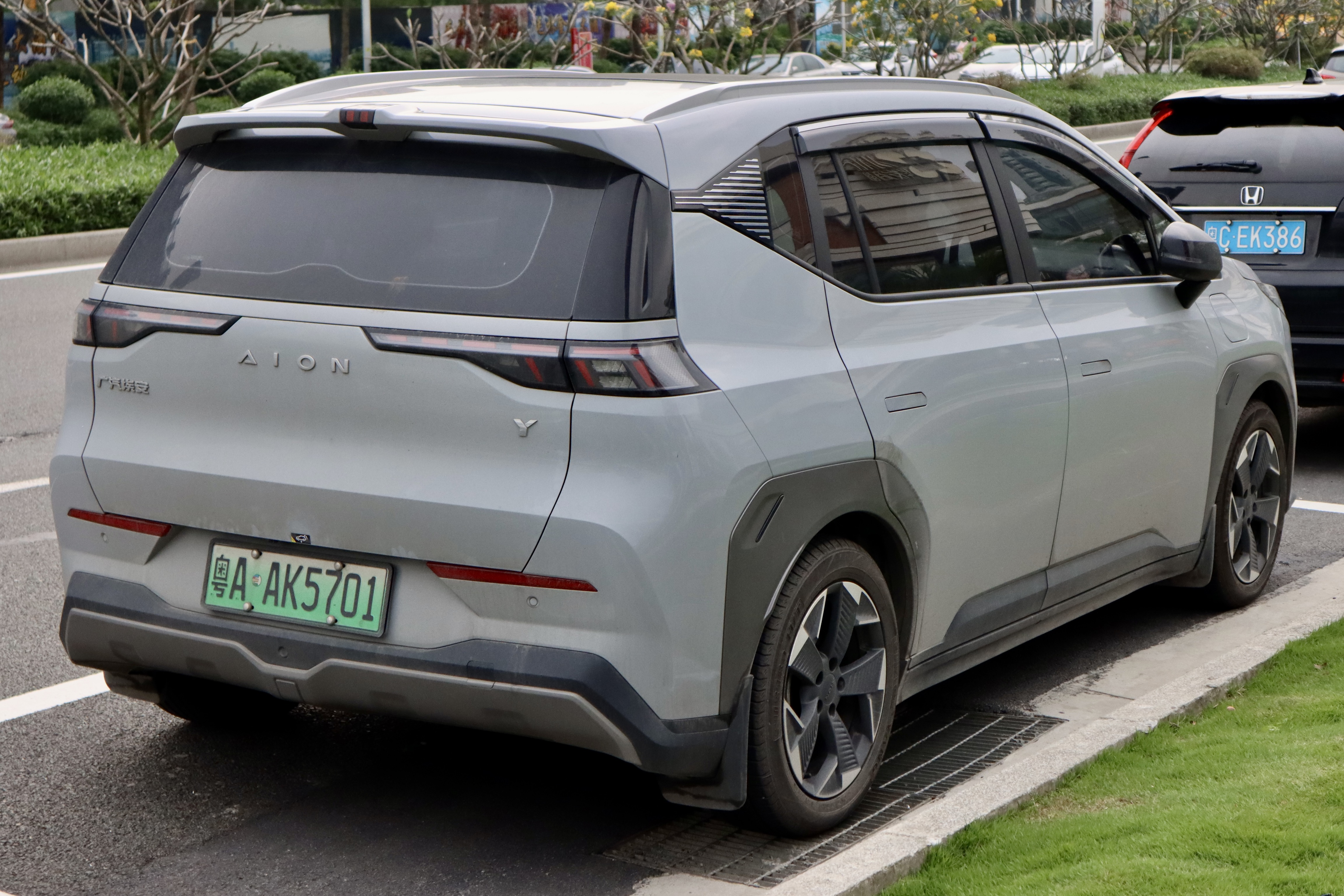
Rear view

The Aion Y was revealed at Auto Guangzhou in November 2020 as a concept previewing the fourth model under the Aion brand. It was revealed along two other GAC vehicles; the Trumpchi Empow performance sedan, and a concept vehicle called the GAC Moca.

The Aion Y was launched in the second half of 2021. A ride-hailing-intended version called Aion Y Pio with different side-fenders and front bumper will also be produced.

On 29 March 2021, Aion started taking pre-sale orders for the Aion Y as the brand's fourth EV. The Aion Y is offered in five grade levels. The Aion Y is equipped with the ADiGO 3.0 automatic driving assistance system, one-button remote parking and 5G in-vehicle entertainment as well as interior features including a LCD instrument panel and large central control screen. The Aion Y is available in four cruising range versions of 460, 500, 503 and 600 kilometres (286, 311, 313 and 373 mi).

The Aion Y features the ADiGO 3.0 autonomous driving system and automatic parking. The Y is based on the new GAC GEP 2.0 platform.

== Battery and powertrain ==
The Aion Y offers an option of three different battery packs, marketed as Magazine Battery and developed in-house by GAC. The Magazine Battery features a special layout that provides better performance of high temperature resistance and explosion resistance and can be built as an NMC lithium-ion battery or a lithium iron phosphate (LFP) battery. The energy density of the battery system on the Aion Y is 184Wh/kg, and the power consumption per 100 kilometres under working conditions is 13.8 kWh.

The smallest battery has a capacity of 60 kWh, paired with a 100 kW (134 hp; 136 PS) is capable of an NEDC range of 460 km (290 mi). The midrange battery is 70 kWh with a NEDC range of 500 km (310 mi). The top version has an 80 kWh battery that is able to achieve a NEDC range of 600 km (370 mi). The 70 and 80 kWh battery models have an electric motor that could produce a maximum of 135 kW (181 hp; 184 PS) and 225 N⋅m (166 lb⋅ft).

The Aion Y is equipped with a permanent magnet synchronous motor on the front axle, with a maximum power of 135 kW (181 hp; 184 PS) and a peak torque of 350 N⋅m (35.7 kg⋅m; 258 lb⋅ft). Four driving modes are available, with three steering modes and additional braking energy recovery modes.

Specifications
Model	Year	Battery		Motor		Range		Kerb weight
Model	Year	Type	Weight	Power	Torque	CLTC	NEDC	Kerb weight
Y 430	2023	51.9kWh LFP		134 hp (100 kW; 136 PS)	176 N⋅m (130 lb⋅ft)	430 km (267 mi)	410 km (255 mi)	1,635 kg (3,605 lb)
Y 430	2024–present	49.8kWh		134 hp (100 kW; 136 PS)	176 N⋅m (130 lb⋅ft)	430 km (267 mi)	410 km (255 mi)	1,590 kg (3,505 lb)
Y Plus 410 Short Range (Thailand & Indonesia)	2024	50.66 kWh LFP		201 hp (150 kW; 204 PS)	225 N⋅m (166 lb⋅ft)	430 km (267 mi)	410 km (255 mi)	1,670 kg (3,682 lb)
Y 510	2025–present	58.9kWh		134 hp (100 kW; 136 PS)	176 N⋅m (130 lb⋅ft)	510 km (317 mi)	490 km (304 mi)	1,685–1,720 kg (3,715–3,792 lb)
Y 510	2023–25	61.7kWh LFP		201 hp (150 kW; 204 PS)	225 N⋅m (166 lb⋅ft)	510 km (317 mi)	490 km (304 mi)	1,685 kg (3,715 lb)
Y Plus 490 Standard Range (Export)	2023–present	63.2kWh LFP		201 hp (150 kW; 204 PS)	225 N⋅m (166 lb⋅ft)	N/A	490 km (304 mi)	1,695–1,750 kg (3,737–3,858 lb)
Y 610	2024–present	68.2kWh		201 hp (150 kW; 204 PS)	225 N⋅m (166 lb⋅ft)	610 km (379 mi)	550 km (342 mi)	1,740 kg (3,836 lb)

== Interior ==
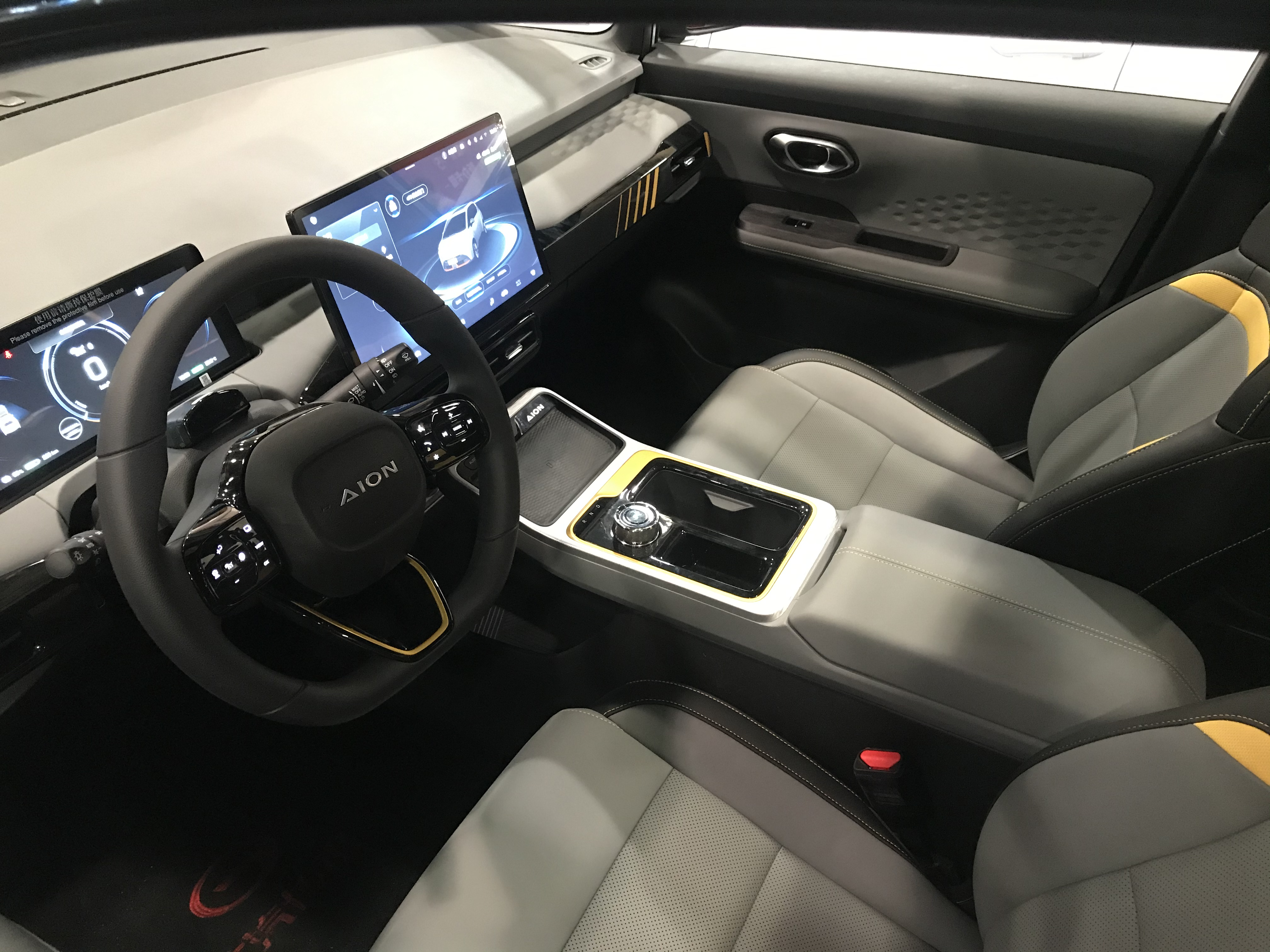
Interior

The Aion Y features a minimalist interior with a large multimedia screen and digital instruments. The central screen has a diameter of 14.5 inches and is oriented horizontally. The Aion Y has 5G connectivity, and is able to scan the face of its occupants and then adjust certain settings accordingly according to GAC.

The intelligent equipment of Aion Y, ADiGO 2.0 driver assistance system integrates 5 safe driving assistance functions, including front collision warning (FCW), active brake assist system (AEB), lane departure warning (LDW), lane keeping assist (LKA), driver status monitoring (DMS) and 7 automatic driving assistance functions, including adaptive cruise (ACC), intelligent high beam (IHBC), intelligent speed limit adaptive cruise (iACC), traffic sign recognition (TSR), Traffic jam assist (TJA), remote parking and integrated cruise (ICA).

== Aion Y Plus ==
Unveiled in October 2022, the Aion Y Plus is an updated variant of the all-electric Aion Y which is slightly longer, features a different styling (taking design cues from the smaller Aion V Plus). Compared with the Aion Y, the length of the Aion Y Plus is lengthened to 4,535 mm (178.5 in). The front overhang is increased by 23 mm (0.9 in), while the rear overhang is increased by 102 mm (4.0 in). The wheelbase remains to be the same as the Aion Y.

The Aion Y Plus is equipped with a permanent magnet synchronous motors with 150 kW (201 hp; 204 PS) and 225 N⋅m (22.9 kg⋅m; 166 lb⋅ft). Two trim levels are available with the Y Plus 70 Executive Edition powered by a 63.98 kWh lithium iron phosphate battery pack developed by GAC in-house which supports a pure electric cruising range of 510 km (320 mi). The Y Plus 80 Executive Edition is equipped with a 76.8 kWh ternary lithium battery pack supporting a pure electric cruising range of 610 km (380 mi).

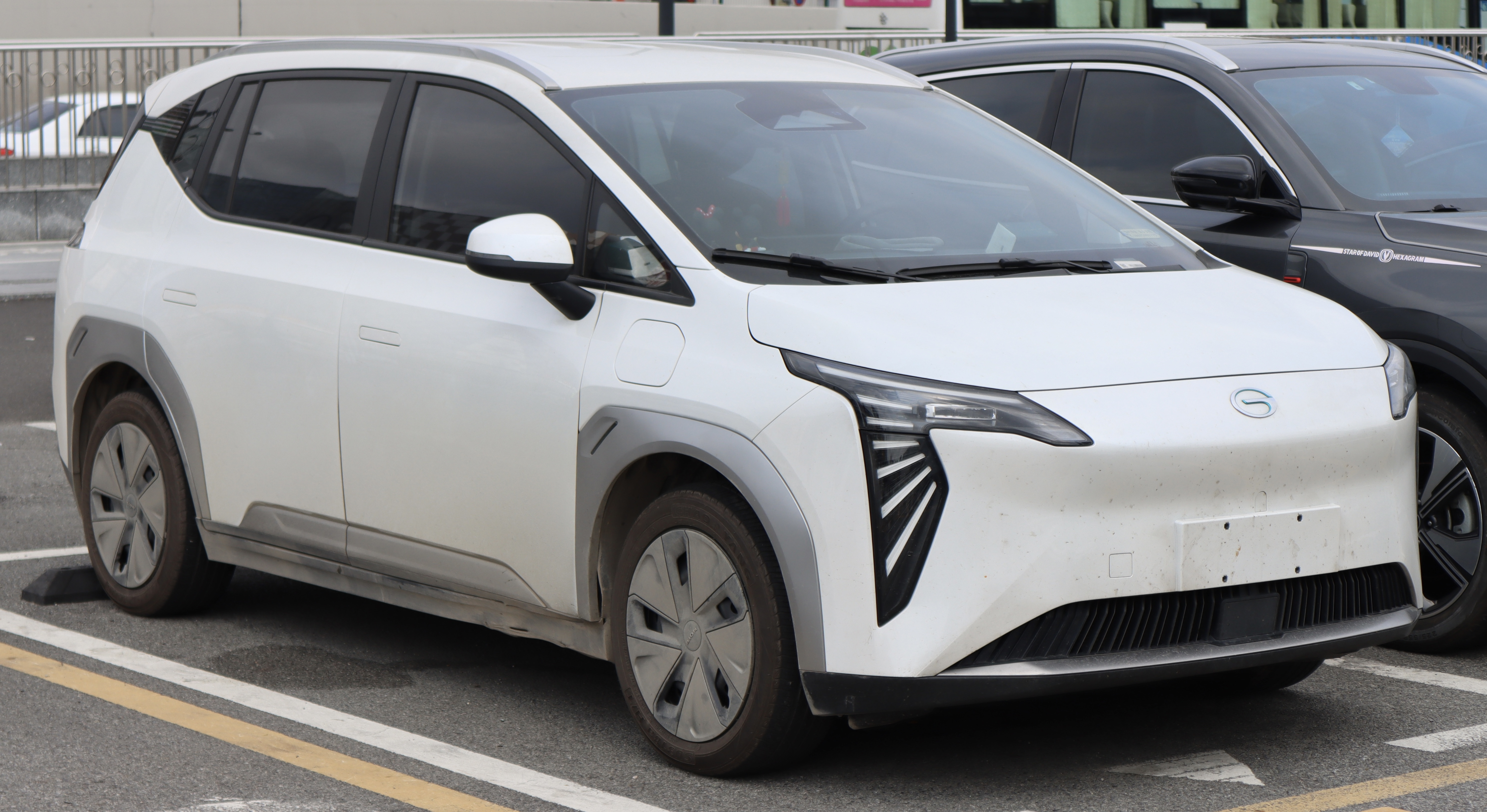
Aion Y Plus

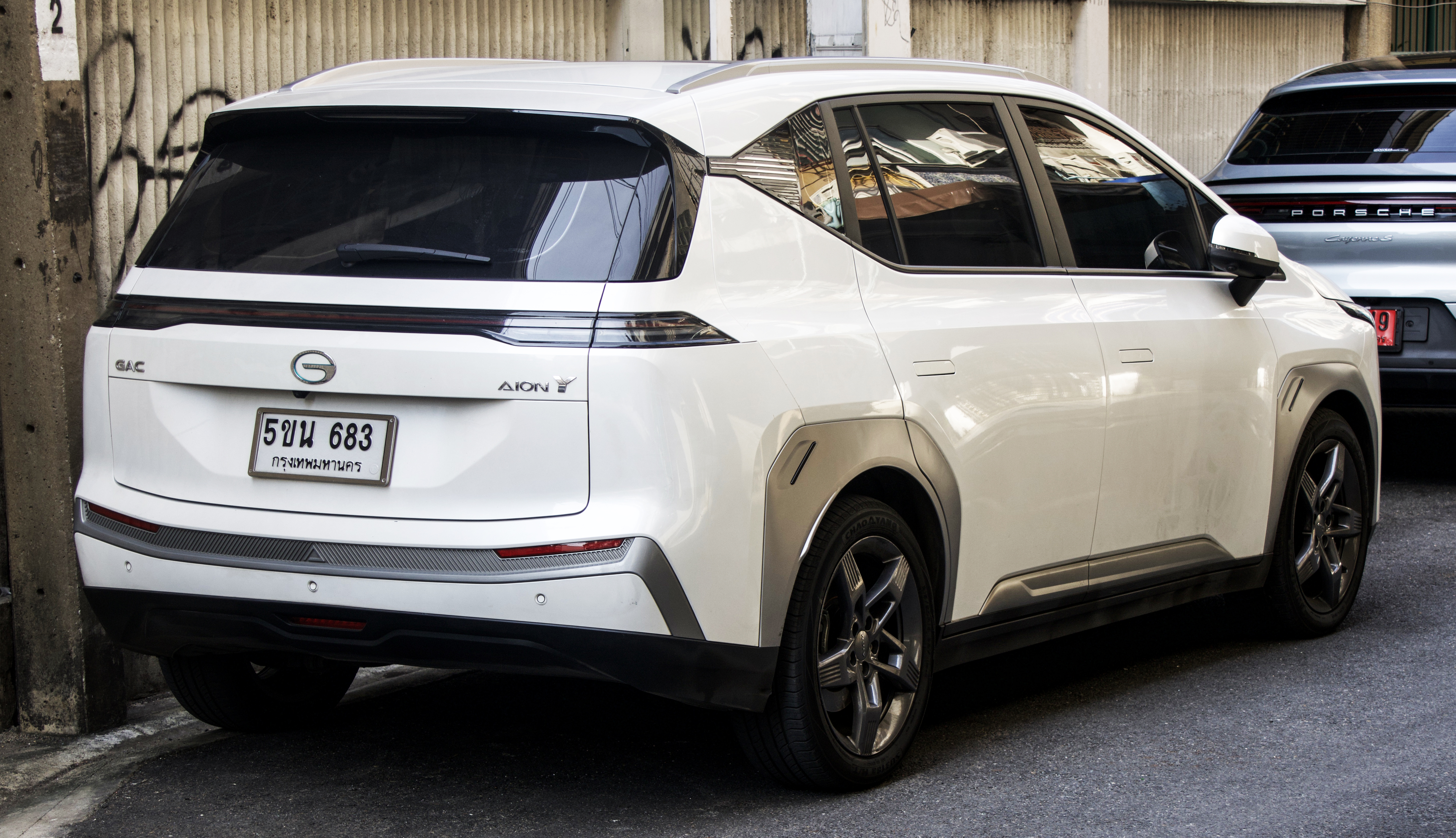
Rear view

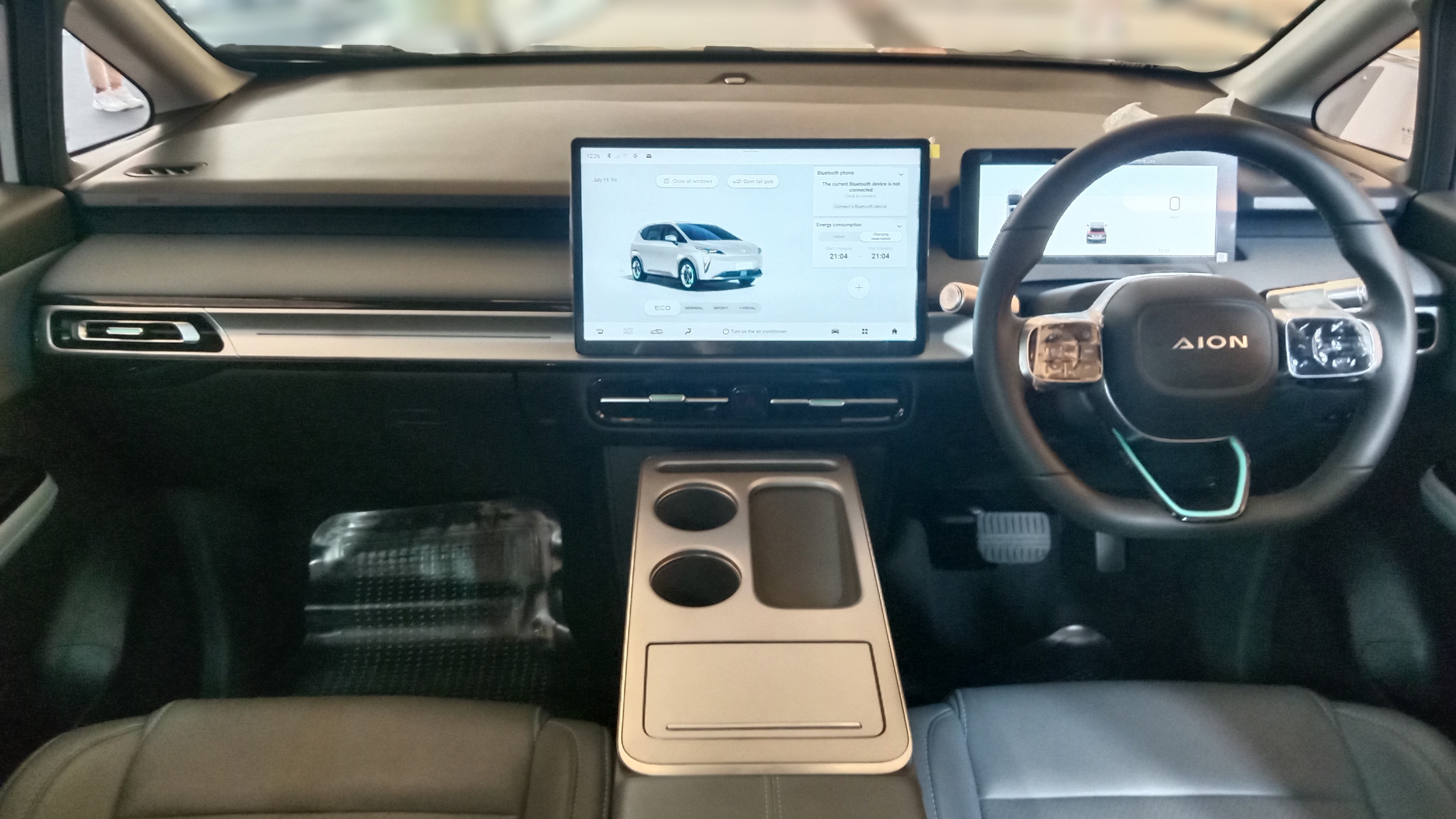
Interior

== Markets ==
The Aion Y Plus was exported overseas since 2023, coinciding with the production of a right-hand drive model.

=== Indonesia ===
The Y Plus was first introduced to the media in Indonesia on 11 June 2024, marking GAC's entry to the Indonesian market and the first model from the Aion brand to be sold in Indonesia. It was launched to the public on 19 June 2024 as GAC's first overall model in the country. Initially imported from China, there are two variant levels available for the Y Plus; Exclusive with the 50.6 kWh battery pack and NEDC range of 410 km (250 mi), and Premium with the 63.2 kWh battery pack and NEDC range of 490 km (300 mi).

=== Malaysia ===
The Y Plus was first introduced in Malaysia in January 2024 during GAC Motor Malaysia's media preview event in Petaling Jaya alongside the GS3 Emzoom and Emkoo, marking the introduction of the brand to the Malaysian market. It was launched on 21 May 2024 at the 2024 Malaysia Autoshow, imported from China. The Y Plus is available in two variant levels: Elite and Premium. Both variants were Standard Range models with the 63.2 kWh battery pack, which supports up to a NEDC range of 490 kilometres (300 mi).

=== Philippines ===
The Y Plus was launched in the Philippines on 17 September 2024, marking GAC's entry to the Philippines market alongside the Aion ES. It is available in two variant levels: Premium and Elite; both variants come with a 50.6 kWh battery pack.

=== Singapore ===
The Y Plus was launched in Singapore on 5 April 2024, marking the first model from the Aion brand to be sold in Singapore. It is available in a sole variant with a 63.2 kWh battery pack.

=== Thailand ===
The Y Plus was launched in Thailand on 9 September 2023, coinciding with the introduction of the GAC brand and its Aion brand to the Thai market, becoming GAC's first overall model to be marketed in Thailand. Initially at launch, two variant levels were available; 490 Elite (Standard Range model) with the 63.2 kWh battery pack and NEDC range of 490 kilometres (300 mi), and 550 Ultra (Long Range model) with the 68.3 kWh battery pack and NEDC range of 550 kilometres (340 mi). The 550 Ultra variant was replaced by the 490 Premium (Standard Range model) variant in November 2023.

=== Vietnam ===
The Y Plus was launched in Vietnam on 16 October 2024, marking GAC's entry to the Vietnamese market alongside the Aion ES. It is available in the sole variant with a 63.2 kWh battery pack.

== Hycan Z03 ==
In October 2021, the GAC and Nio joint venture Hycan launched its second product, the Z03.

The Hycan Z03 is an Aion Y with redesigned front/rear ends, interior, and wheels, with dimensions of 4,602 mm (181.2 in) in length, 1,900 mm (74.8 in) in width, and 1,645 mm (64.8 in) in height, and a wheelbase of 2,750 mm (108.3 in). Three trim levels are offered at launch. The electrical motor used in the Chaowan and the Chaozhi trims of the Hycan Z03 can develop as much as 135 kW (181 hp; 184 PS) and 225 N⋅m (166 lb⋅ft) of torque, while the Z Chao trim carries an electric motor producing 160 kilowatts (215 hp; 218 PS) and 225 N⋅m (166 lb⋅ft) of torque. The Z03 is cable of NEDC-rated ranges of 500 and 600 kilometres (310 and 370 mi) based on two different battery capacities of 64.6 and 76.8 kWh (233 and 276 MJ).

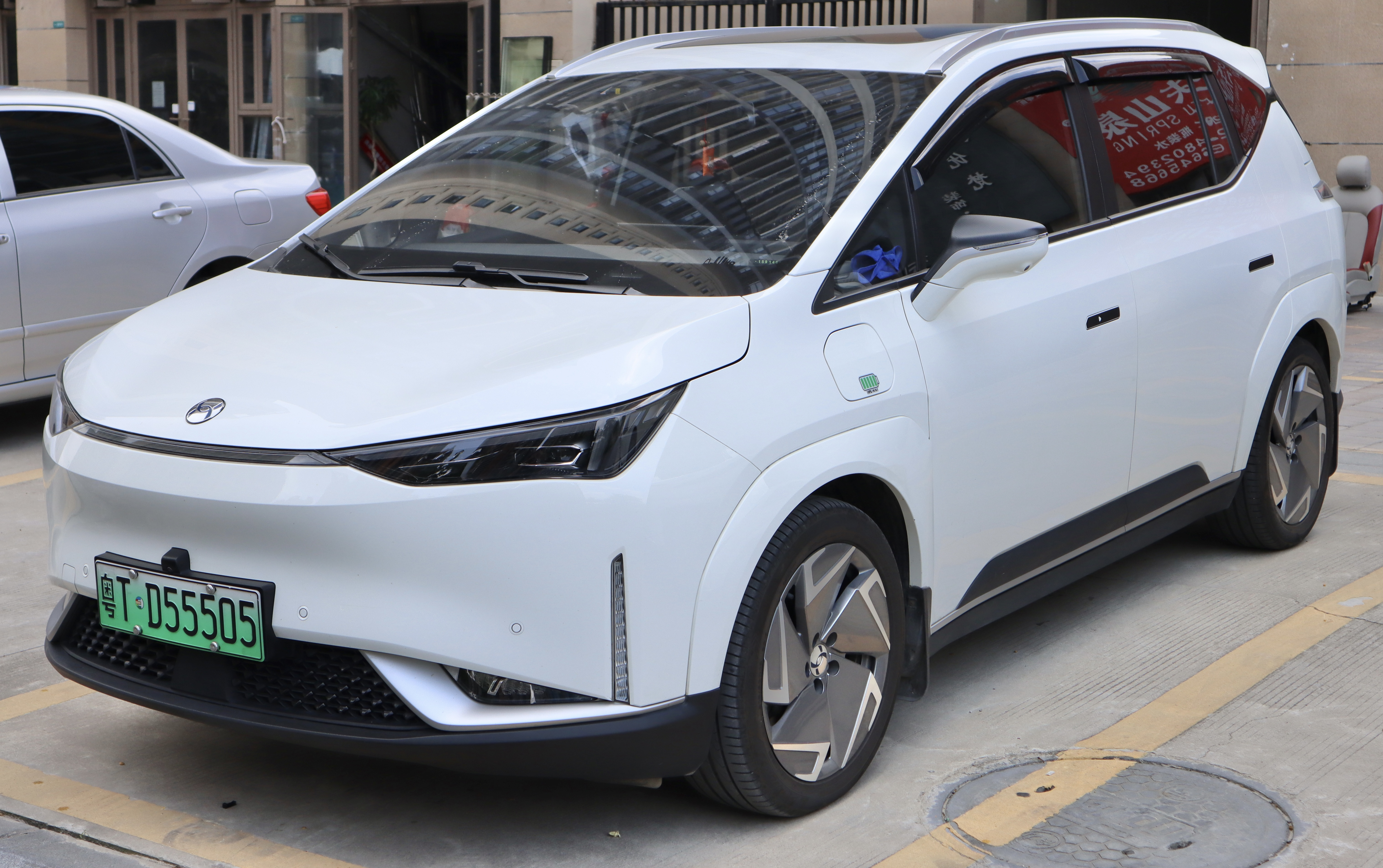
Hycan Z03

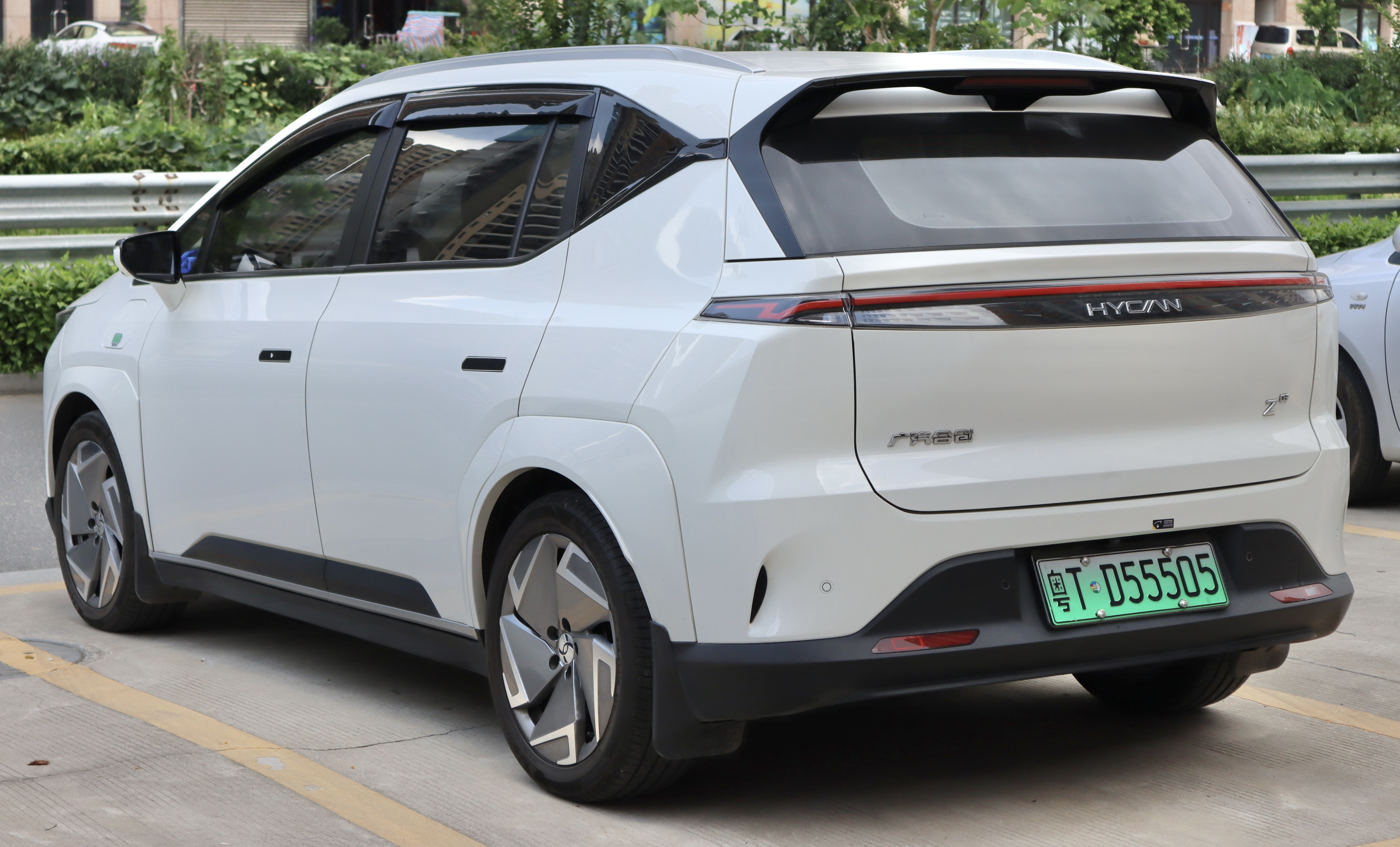
Rear view

== Sales ==
=== Aion Y/Y Plus ===
Year	China	Thailand	Indonesia	Malaysia
2021	34,108	—	—	—
2022	119,687	—	—	—
2023	204,027	89	—	—
2024	152,357	3,874	861	77
2025	72,956	3,208	751	

=== Hycan Z03 ===
Year	China
2021	2,601
2022	17,819
2023	16,118
2024	2,314
2025	904
