= Michele Raffin =

American aviculturist

Michele Raffin is an American aviculturist, writer, and founder of Pandemonium Aviaries, a non-profit organization in Los Altos, California that is one of the largest exotic bird sanctuaries in the United States. Pandemonium Aviaries is now a leader in conservation breeding of exotic species for return to the wild. The focus of the organization is on birds from New Guinea. Among the important species that Pandemonium breeds and protects are the Crowned pigeons, the Nicobar pigeons, and the Green-naped pheasant pigeons.

Michele Raffin is a former venture capitalist in the Silicon Valley who obtained a degree in 1980s from Stanford Graduate School of Business, and founded Pandemonium in 1996. She has written three books, the most recent about her experiences with Pandemonium. The Birds of Pandemonium has received the following honors:

- Selected for the Barnes & Noble Discover Great New Writers Program
- Included in Amazon's Non-fiction Best Books of the Month (October 2014)
- IndieBound's Next Great Reads List (November 2014 )
- Entertainment Weekly's MUST List (October 2014)
- Reading Group Choices New & Emerging Writers List
- Audubon Sponsored Contest
- AARP recommended as Holiday Gift (November 2014)
- Mentioned in the National Book Critics Circle
- First on Kitsap Regional Library's list of "Books to Inspire"

Michele Raffin is an Olympic weightlifter. She won a gold medal in the 2011 masters Pan American Games, and broke 9 records.

== Books ==
- The Birds of Pandemonium (1st ed.). Algonquin Books/Workman Publishing Company. 2014. ISBN 978-1-61620-136-4. LCCN 2014023612.
- The Good Nanny Book: How to Find, Hire, and Keep the Perfect Nanny for Your Child. New York, N.Y.: Berkley Books. 1996. ISBN 0425151336.
- Love That Lasts: a Singles Guide to Finding a Great Mate. Freedom, CA: Crossing Press. 1993. ISBN 0895945894.
