= Mariam Naficy =

American entrepreneur

- Education: Stanford Graduate School of Business
- Occupation: Entrepreneur
- Website: LinkedIn profile

Mariam Naficy is an American entrepreneur. She is the co-founder and board chairman of Tonic.xyz, a fine art NFT gallery and community focused on generative art collections.

Mariam previously was CEO and founder of the trend-setting online design marketplace Minted and prior to that, founded one of the first online cosmetic retailers, Eve.com, in 1998. Eve won kudos from media outlets such as Fortune Magazine and CNN for its site architecture and other innovations.

== Early life and education ==
Naficy was born to Iranian and Chinese parents who are graduates of Georgetown University and were stationed abroad throughout Africa and the Middle East. Her parent was a United Nations development economist, and she spent her childhood in six countries, including Egypt, Tanzania, and Iran. She earned a degree in political science from Williams College, and then proceeded to pursue her master's degree from the Stanford Graduate School of Business in 1998.

While in business school, Naficy published The Fast Track: The Insider's Guide to Winning Jobs in Management Consulting, Investment Banking, & Securities Trading, which has sold 50,000 copies.

== Career ==
Naficy worked as an investment banker at Goldman Sachs early in her career. In 1998 at the age of 28, she co-founded Eve.com, which later sold for $110 million to Idealab in 2000.

She led project management at Movielink, a 5-studio consortium, including Sony Pictures, Warner Brothers, Universal that was one of the first downloadable movie services.

After that, she was Vice President and General Manager at The Body Shop, launching their first e-commerce business in 2004.

Naficy founded the online stationery store Minted.com in 2008. It stalled at first, but grew to 400 employees by 2019. Raising $208 million in 2018, it was the largest funding transaction that year involving a startup led by a female founder.

Naficy sits on the Board of Directors of Minted, Medium, Victoria's Secret, and Every Mother Counts. She is a Trustee of Williams College and a member of the Advisory Council of Stanford's Graduate School of Business.

== Works ==
- The Fast Track: The Insider's Guide to Winning Jobs in Management Consulting, Investment Banking, and Securities Trading, Broadway Books, 1997, ISBN 9780767900409.

== Personal life ==
Her husband, Michael Mader, also works at Minted. They have two children.
