= Aion RT =

Battery electric mid-size sedan

Overview
- Manufacturer: GAC Aion
- Model code: AY3
- Production: September 2024 – present
- Assembly: China: Guangzhou

Body and chassis
- Class: Mid-size car (D)
- Body style: 4-door sedan
- Layout: Front-motor, front-wheel-drive
- Platform: AEP 3.0
- Related: Aion UT; Aion V (second generation)

Powertrain
- Electric motor: 165 kW TZ180XYXOF51 permanent magnet synchronous
- Power output: 150–165 kW (204–224 PS; 201–221 hp)
- Battery: 54.04 kWh Choco-SEB LFP CATL; 55.1 kWh Danxia LFP CATL; 68.1 kWh Danxia LFP CATL
- Electric range: 505–650 km (314–404 mi) (CLTC)

Dimensions
- Wheelbase: 2,760 mm (108.7 in)
- Length: 4,865 mm (191.5 in)
- Width: 1,875 mm (73.8 in)
- Height: 1,515 mm (59.6 in)
- Curb weight: 1,670–1,870 kg (3,682–4,123 lb)

The Aion RT is a battery electric mid-size sedan produced by Chinese automobile manufacturer GAC Aion, a subsidiary of GAC Group.

== Overview ==
The RT was first revealed through images released by the Ministry of Industry and Information Technology on September 15, 2024. Pre-sale of the RT began shortly after on September 26 with four model trims.

The RT Super, a battery swap capable version of the RT launched on 8 April 2026. It is compatible with CATL's Choco-SEB battery swap network, which Aion claims is capable of swapping packs in 99 seconds.

The exterior of the RT follows a 'velociraptor' design language, and has a drag coefficient of 0.208C_{d}. The interior features an 8.88-inch digital instrument cluster, a 14.6-inch infotainment touchscreen display, dual-50W wireless charging pads in the center console, and an 11-speaker audio system featuring an 8-inch 45 Hz subwoofer.

The RT is available with a 'no-map' semiautonomous driving system capable of navigating without relying on high-resolution maps, featuring a 126-line LiDAR sensor and a single Nvidia Orin-X chip for 254 TOPS of performance.

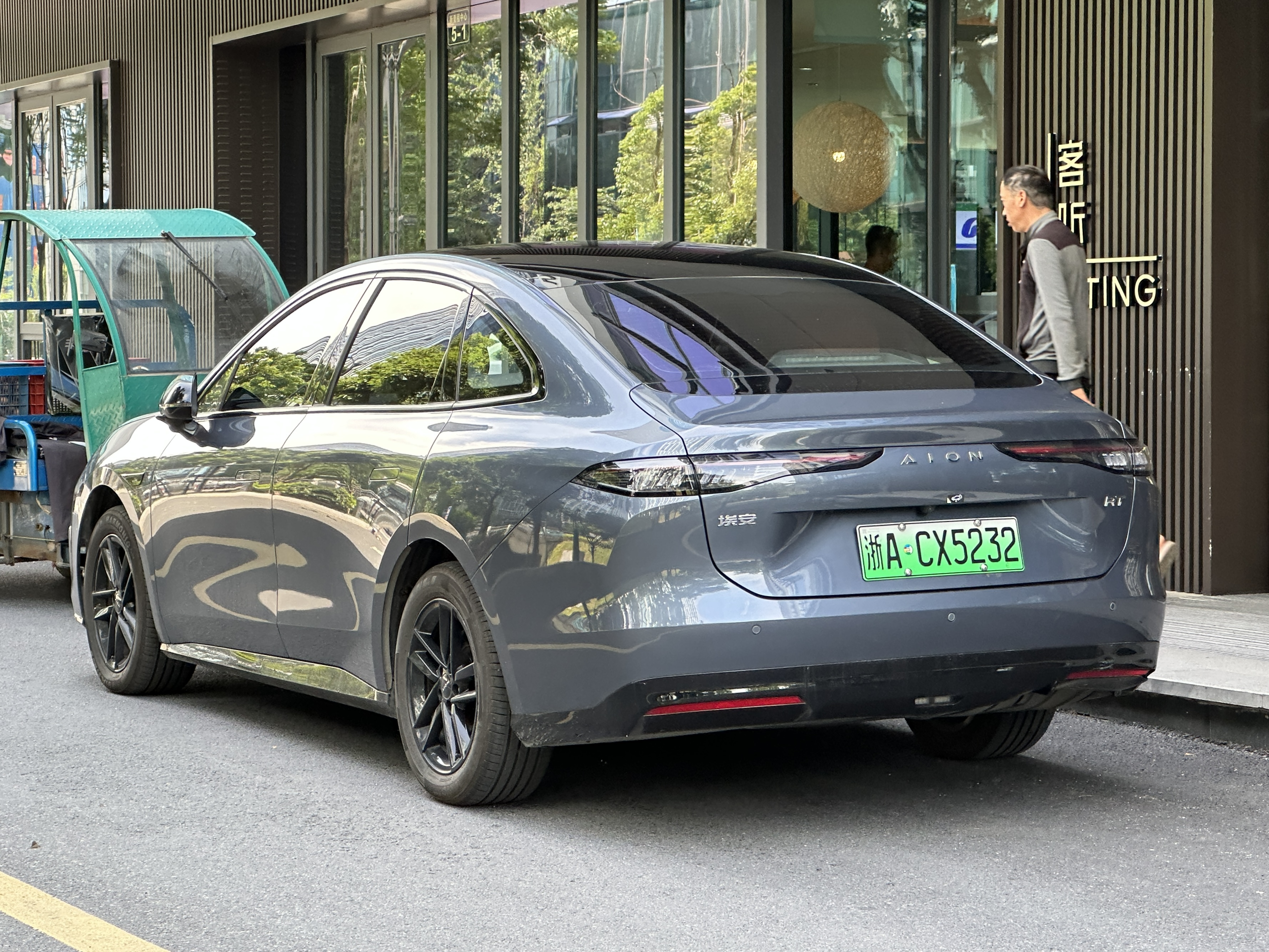
Rear view

== Specifications ==
At launch, the RT was available with two lithium iron phosphate battery (LFP) Danxia (Chinese: 弹匣; pinyin: dàn xiá; lit. 'magazine') packs supplied by CATL, one with a capacity of 55.1 kWh and another with a 68.1 kWh capacity, with CLTC ranges of 520 and 650 km (323 and 404 mi), respectively. All models use the same 165 kW permanent magnet synchronous front motor, though models with the smaller pack output 150 kW (201 hp; 204 PS) and only the top 68.1 kWh model outputs the full 165 kW (221 hp; 224 PS). The top 68.1 kWh model has 400V silicon carbide power electronics, which enables it to charge from 30–80% in 18 minutes.

The RT Super uses a 54.036 kWh Choco-SEB LFP air-cooled battery pack, which is compatible with CATL's Choco-SEB battery swap network. The battery can be swapped in 99 seconds, or can be charged from 30–80% in 26 minutes. Its motor outputs 201 hp (150 kW; 204 PS) and it has a 0–100 km/h (62 mph) time of 7.5 seconds. The battery has a lifetime warranty provided by CATL with an annual mileage limit of 30,000 km (18,600 mi) per year.

Specifications
Battery	Power	Torque	Range	30–80% charge time	0–100 km/h (62 mph) time	Top speed	Kerb weight
54.036 kWh	201 hp (150 kW; 204 PS)	240 N⋅m (177 lb⋅ft)	505 km (314 mi)	26 min	7.5	163 km/h (101 mph)	1,685 kg (3,715 lb)
55.1 kWh	201 hp (150 kW; 204 PS)	240 N⋅m (177 lb⋅ft)	520 km (323 mi)	24 min	7.5	163 km/h (101 mph)	1,670 kg (3,682 lb)
68.1 kWh	221 hp (165 kW; 224 PS)	240 N⋅m (177 lb⋅ft)	650 km (404 mi)	18 min	7.7	163 km/h (101 mph)	1,750 kg (3,858 lb)

== Sales ==
Year	China
2024	33,616
2025	54,386
