= Nisa Leung =

Venture capitalist in China

Nisa Leung (Chinese:梁颕宇 or 梁颖宇) is a venture capitalist and former managing partner at Qiming Venture Partners. She has been named on the Forbes Midas List for six consecutive years since 2019. and ranked top 2 in Best Women Venture Capitalists by Forbes China for three successive years since 2021. She was awarded The Fortune Most Powerful Women Asia (MPW Asia) in 2024 by Fortune Asia and The Most Powerful Women in Business by Fortune China from 2022 to 2024. Nisa is widely known as China's leading investor in healthcare.

== Education ==
Nisa earned a Bachelor of Science degree from Cornell University and graduated from Stanford Graduate School of Business in 2001 with an MBA.

== Career ==
Nisa started her career in healthcare investment after realizing there was a lack of advanced therapeutics in China when her family was seeking treatments for her distant uncle, who was diagnosed with liver cancer.

Prior to joining Qiming Venture Partners in 2006, she co-founded Biomedic Holdings, which had operations and investments in medical devices, pharmaceuticals, and health care services in China including Novamed Pharmaceuticals (acquired by SciClone NASDAQ:SCLN) and U-Systems (acquired by GE Healthcare). She was also Venture Partner of PacRim Ventures in Menlo Park and was previously with Softbank/Mobius Venture Capital.

Nisa is recognized as playing a key role in China's biotech boom and innovation.

In February 2025, Qiming Venture Partners announced that Leung had departed after 19 years at the firm.
