= Qiming Venture Partners =

China Venture Capital Firm

- Native name: 啟明創投
- Company type: Private
- Industry: Venture Capital
- Founded: 2006; 20 years ago
- Founders: Gary Rieschel; Duane Kuang
- Headquarters: Jin Mao Tower, Shanghai, China
- Products: Investments
- AUM: US$9.5 billion (August 2024)
- Website: www.qimingvc.com

Qiming Venture Partners (Qiming; Chinese: 啟明創投; pinyin: Qǐmíng chuàngtóu) is a China-based venture capital firm. It primarily invests in technology, Internet and healthcare-related companies across China. It is an early investor in ByteDance, Xiaomi, Meituan, and Bilibili. According to South China Morning Post, from January 2019 to May 2020, it was the seventh-most active venture capital firm in China.

== Background ==
Qiming was founded in 2006 by Gary Rieschel and Duane Kuang. Rieschel and Kuang were previously with Softbank and Intel Capital respectively. Nisa Leung joined the firm that year and would become its managing partner.

Qiming focuses on investments in China. As of 2016, investors included Princeton University, Duke University, and the Robert Wood Johnson Foundation.

In 2017, the firm set up its American branch, Qiming Venture Partners (USA).

In February 2025, Leung stepped down from her position as managing partner of Qiming in what was seen as a leadership change in the firm.
