= Aion UT =

Battery electric compact hatchback

Overview
- Manufacturer: GAC Aion
- Model code: AY2
- Also called: UMO 3 (Russia)
- Production: February 2025 – present
- Assembly: China: Guangzhou; Indonesia: Purwakarta (National Assemblers); Austria: Graz (Magna Steyr); Thailand: Rayong (Aion Automobile Manufacturing (Thailand))

Body and chassis
- Class: Compact car (C)
- Body style: 5-door hatchback
- Layout: Front-motor, front-wheel-drive
- Platform: AEP 3.0
- Related: Aion RT; Aion V (second generation)

Powertrain
- Electric motor: 100 kW (136 PS; 134 hp); 150 kW (204 PS; 201 hp) (export)
- Battery: 32.24 kWh Farasis LFP Magazine (320 Star; China); 34.8 kWh LFP Magazine (330 Star; China); 44 kWh LFP Magazine (440; China, Singapore, Indonesia); 50 kWh LFP Magazine (Thailand); 54.0 kWh LFP CATL Choco-swap (China); 55.7 kWh LFP CATL (Ningde Edition); 60 kWh LFP Magazine (Europe, Asia-pacific)
- Electric range: 335–430 km (208–267 mi) (WLTP); 320–530 km (200–330 mi) (CLTC); 400–500 km (250–310 mi) (NEDC)
- Plug-in charging: DC: 64–130 kW

Dimensions
- Wheelbase: 2,750 mm (108.3 in)
- Length: 4,270 mm (168.1 in)
- Width: 1,850 mm (72.8 in)
- Height: 1,575 mm (62.0 in)
- Curb weight: 1,510–1,540 kg (3,329–3,395 lb)

The Aion UT is a battery electric compact hatchback produced by Chinese automobile manufacturer GAC Aion, a subsidiary of GAC Group. In China, it is marketed as the Aion UT 鹦鹉龙 (pinyin: Yīngwǔ lóng; lit. 'psittacosaurus' or parrot dragon).

== Overview ==
The UT was first revealed through images released by the Ministry of Industry and Information Technology on October 31, 2024 as the AY2. Its official public reveal was at Auto Guangzhou in November 2024, shown alongside the Hyptec HL full-size SUV.

The UT was designed by GAC design studio in Milan, Italy.

The UT is equipped with an 8.8-inch digital instrument panel and 14.6-inch central infotainment touchscreen which is compatible with Apple Carplay, Huawei HiCar, and ICCOA Carlink, and is powered by a Qualcomm Snapdragon 8155P. It has a rear cargo capacity of 440 L (15.5 cu ft).

Rear view

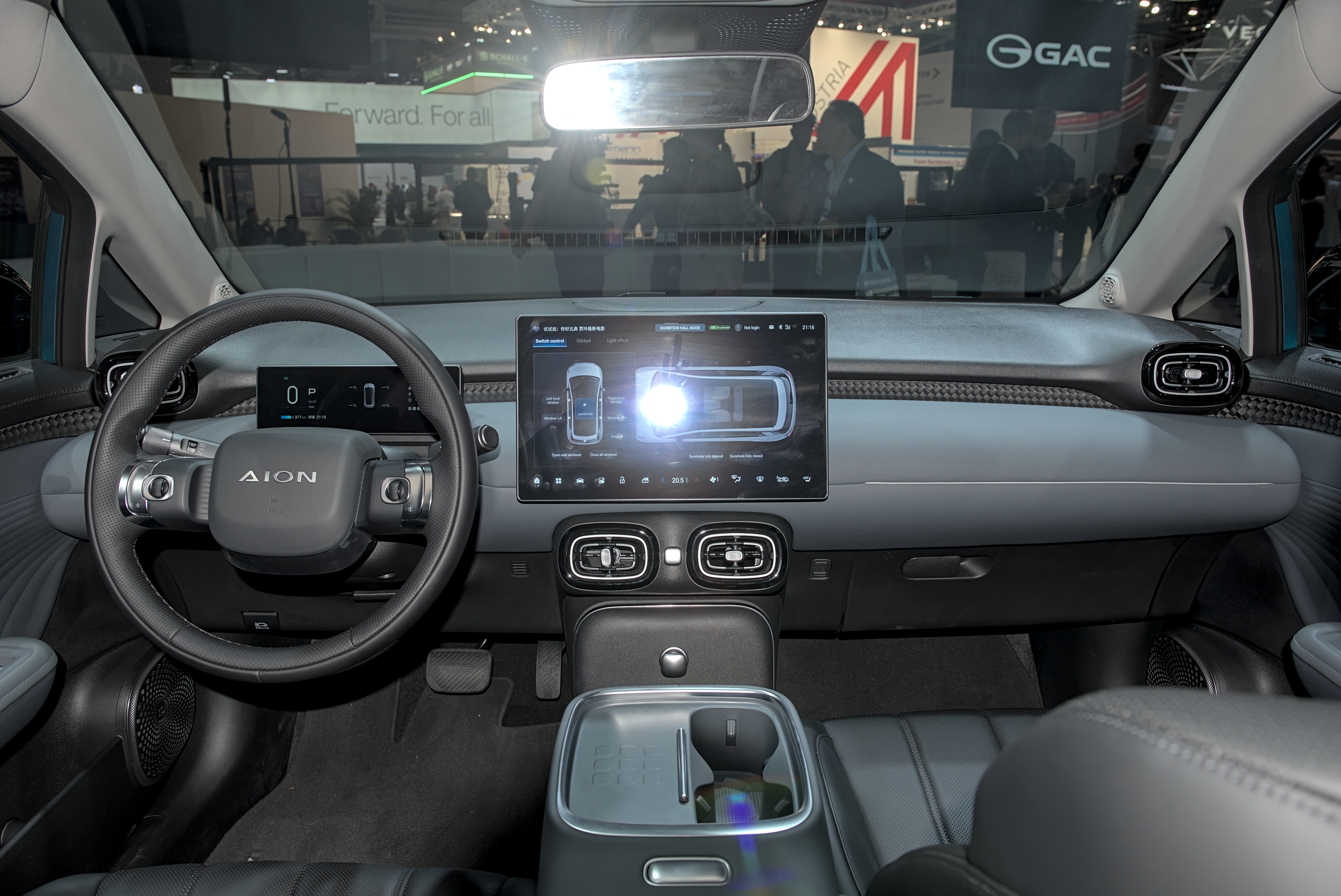
Interior

On 22 August at the 2026 Chengdu Auto Show, Aion released the UT Ningde Edition, named so for its battery pack supplied by Ningde-based CATL. It has a 56.7 kWh battery which provides 530 km (329 mi) of CLTC range.

== Powertrain ==
Specifications
Model	Battery			Power	Torque	Range		Charging		0–100 km/h (62 mph) time	Top speed	Kerb weight
Model	Type	Supplier	Weight	Power	Torque	WLTP	CLTC	30–80% time	Peak kW	0–100 km/h (62 mph) time	Top speed	Kerb weight
320 Star Edition	32.24 kWh LFP	Farasis	248 kg (547 lb)	134 hp (100 kW; 136 PS)	145 N⋅m (107 lb⋅ft)	—	320 km (199 mi)	26 mins		11.9 sec	150 km/h (93 mph)	1,436 kg (3,166 lb)
330 Star Edition	34.836 kWh LFP	GAC Inpai, Farasis	324 kg (714 lb)	134 hp (100 kW; 136 PS)	145 N⋅m (107 lb⋅ft)	—	330 km (205 mi)	24 mins		11.9 sec	150 km/h (93 mph)	1,510 kg (3,329 lb)
330 Star Edition	34.868 kWh LFP	GAC Inpai, Farasis	327 kg (721 lb)	134 hp (100 kW; 136 PS)	145 N⋅m (107 lb⋅ft)	—	330 km (205 mi)	24 mins		11.9 sec	150 km/h (93 mph)	1,510 kg (3,329 lb)
420	44.089 kWh LFP	GAC Inpai, Farasis	324 kg (714 lb)	134 hp (100 kW; 136 PS)	145 N⋅m (107 lb⋅ft)	335 km (208 mi)	420 km (261 mi)	24 mins		11.9 sec	150 km/h (93 mph)	1,540 kg (3,395 lb)
420	44.133 kWh LFP	GAC Inpai, Farasis	327 kg (721 lb)	134 hp (100 kW; 136 PS)	145 N⋅m (107 lb⋅ft)	335 km (208 mi)	420 km (261 mi)	24 mins	64kW	11.9 sec	150 km/h (93 mph)	1,540 kg (3,395 lb)
Ningde Edition	55.684 kWh LFP	CATL	406.3 kg (896 lb)	134 hp (100 kW; 136 PS)	145 N⋅m (107 lb⋅ft)	—	530 km (329 mi)	24 mins		11.9 sec	150 km/h (93 mph)	1,600 kg (3,527 lb)
UT Super	54.036 kWh LFP Choco-swap	CATL	415 kg (915 lb)	134 hp (100 kW; 136 PS)	145 N⋅m (107 lb⋅ft)	—	500 km (311 mi)	26 mins	75kW	11.9 sec	150 km/h (93 mph)	1,600 kg (3,527 lb)
Export only
Singapore	44.12 kWh LFP	GAC Inpai, Farasis	327 kg (721 lb)	134 hp (100 kW; 136 PS)	145 N⋅m (107 lb⋅ft)	335 km (208 mi)		24 mins	70kW	12 sec	145 km/h (90 mph)	1,540 kg (3,395 lb)
Indonesia	44.12 kWh LFP	GAC Inpai, Farasis	327 kg (721 lb)	134 hp (100 kW; 136 PS)	145 N⋅m (107 lb⋅ft)		400 km (249 mi) (NEDC)	24 mins	64kW	11.4 sec		1,540 kg (3,395 lb)
Thailand	50.27 kWh LFP		355 kg (783 lb)	134 hp (100 kW; 136 PS)	145 N⋅m (107 lb⋅ft)	—	420 km (261 mi) (NEDC)	24 mins	80kW	11.9 sec	150 km/h (93 mph)	
Europe	60 kWh LFP		430 kg (948 lb)	134 hp (100 kW; 136 PS)	167 N⋅m (123 lb⋅ft)	420 km (261 mi)	—	24 mins	130kW	7.3 sec	160 km/h (99 mph)	1,745 kg (3,847 lb)
Singapore	60 kWh LFP		430 kg (948 lb)	134 hp (100 kW; 136 PS)	210 N⋅m (155 lb⋅ft)	410 km (255 mi)	—	24 mins	80kW	10 sec	160 km/h (99 mph)	1,670 kg (3,682 lb)
Asia-Pacific	60 kWh LFP		430 kg (948 lb)	201 hp (150 kW; 204 PS)	210 N⋅m (155 lb⋅ft)	430 km (267 mi)	500 km (311 mi) (NEDC)	24 mins	87kW	7.3 sec	160 km/h (99 mph)	1,670 kg (3,682 lb)

== Safety ==
Euro NCAP test results Aion UT (2026)
Test	Score
Overall:	5 /5 stars
Safe driving	66%
Crash avoidance	74%
Crash protection	91%
Post crash	88%

ANCAP test results GAC Aion UT (2026, aligned with Euro NCAP)
Test	Score
Overall:	5 /5 stars
Safe driving	68%
Crash avoidance	74%
Crash protection	90%
Post crash	88%

== Markets ==
=== Australia ===
The Aion UT was launched in Australia on 13 March 2026, with two variants: Premium and Luxury, both variants use the 60 kWh battery pack.

=== Indonesia ===
The Aion UT was introduced in Indonesia on 27 June 2025 with pre-orders opened, and was launched on 23 July 2025 at the 32nd Gaikindo Indonesia International Auto Show. It is available with two variants: Standard (44.1 kWh) and Premium (60 kWh).

=== Philippines ===
The Aion UT was launched in the Philippines on 21 May 2026, with a single variant: Elite, using the 44.1 kWh battery pack.

=== Singapore ===
The Aion UT was launched in Singapore on 8 January 2026, with two variants: Standard (44.12 kWh) and Premium (60 kWh).

=== Thailand ===
The Aion UT was launched in Thailand on 24 June 2025, with two variants: 420 Standard (50.27 kWh) and 500 Premium (60 kWh).

== Sales ==
Year	China	Thailand (Note: Figures based on registration (Thailand))
2025	50,100	3,730
