= Minted =

Premium design goods brand selling stationery, art, and home decor

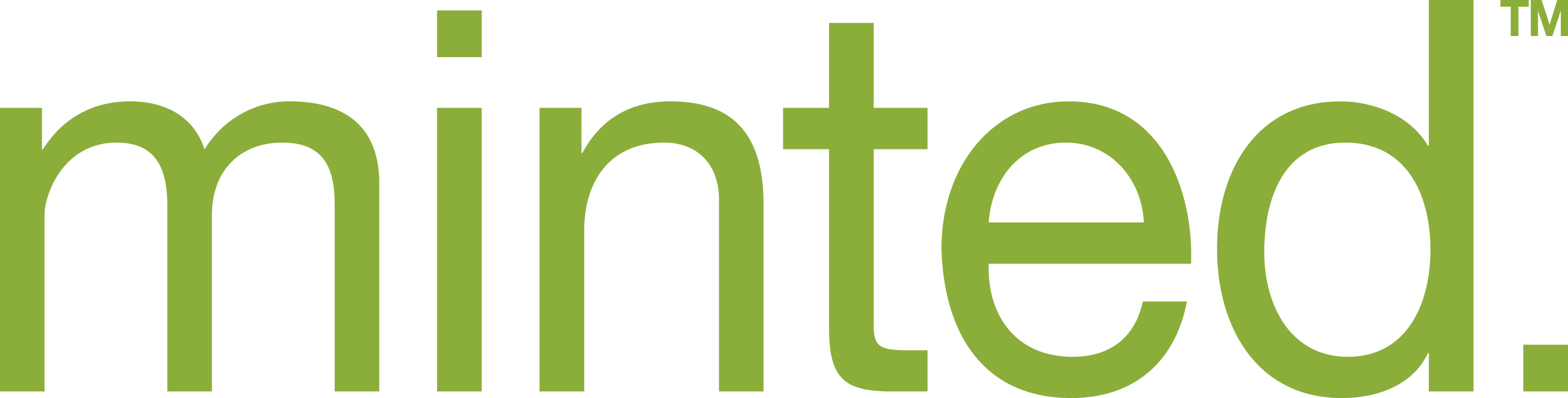
- Minted logo
- Company type: Private
- Industry: Marketplace, E-commerce
- Founded: 2007
- Founder: Mariam Naficy
- Headquarters: San Francisco, California, United States
- Key people: Melissa Kim (Co-Founder and CEO)
- Products: Art, stationery, home decor
- Number of employees: 350
- Website: www.minted.com

Minted is a premium omnichannel design brand, selling stationery, art, and home decor designed by independent artists and designers. The company sources art and design from a community of more than 20,000 independent artists from around the world. Minted offers artists two business models for selling their goods - one in which Minted handles manufacturing and fulfillment and a second where the artists handle manufacturing and fulfillment. Minted is headquartered in San Francisco, California and is led by Co-Founder and CEO, Melissa Kim.

== History ==
Minted was founded in April 2007 by Mariam Naficy to sell high-end lines of stationery and adopted a crowdsourcing model when it realized that designs by independent artists were outselling those of established brands. Minted has raised more than $300 million from investors, including T. Rowe Price, Permira, Norwest Venture Partners, Technology Crossover Ventures, Benchmark Capital, Ridge Ventures. Angel investors include former Yahoo CEO Marissa Mayer, Yelp CEO Jeremy Stoppelman, and Eventbrite founders Kevin and Julia Hartz.

In 2012, Minted expanded outside of its core stationery market by launching wall art.

In 2017, Minted launched wholesale, with national retail partners including Target, West Elm, and Pottery Barn Kids.

In 2021, Minted introduced a third-party marketplace model, where artists manufacture and fulfill their own products, including ceramics, original art, textiles, and specialty stationery.

In 2025, Minted expanded its wholesale business, launching nationwide at Whole Foods Market, launching gift packaging nationwide at Target, and launching at H-E-B.

== Crowdsourcing ==
Minted holds regular design challenges that are open to artists and designers. Thousands of independent artists participate in the challenges. More than 2,000 designs are submitted by artists to Minted every week.

Visitors to the website vote on the design submissions to help choose the winning designs that will be sold on the website. Minted's predictive voting algorithms use consumer votes to predict which of the thousands of submissions from the contest will be future bestsellers.

Winning artists are paid a cash prize and earn an ongoing commission on sales of their designs.

== Awards ==
In October 2014, Minted was named #5 on LinkedIn's 10 Bay Area startups that are most in demand by local techies.
