= Guangzhou Automobile Industry Group =

Chinese state-owned company

Guangzhou Automobile Industry Group Company Limited
- Type: State-owned enterprise
- Industry: Automobile
- Founded: 2000; 26 years ago
- Headquarters: Guangzhou, Guangdong, China
- Area served: China
- Key people: Chairman: Zeng Qinghong
- Revenue: 364,053,630,000 renminbi (2018)
- Subsidiaries: GAC Group; Denway Motors
- Website: www.gagc.com.cn

Guangzhou Automobile Industry Group Co Ltd (GAIG, Chinese: 广州汽车工业集团) is a Chinese state-owned joint stock holding company that owns several Chinese automakers.

A Chinese partner of Japanese companies Toyota and Honda, GAIG owns Chinese production bases that produce Chinese-market versions of the Japanese carmakers' models, which sell well in Southern China as of 2010.

== History ==
Born during a reconstruction of the Guangzhou automotive industry in 2000, GAIG receives considerable support from the governments of Guangdong province and Guangzhou city.

Formerly the Guangzhou Automobile Industry Group Company, it was renamed in 2003.

In 2007, GAIG began putting in motion plans to sell automobiles under its own brand and to further this goal had acquired a controlling share in an R&D center at South China University of Technology.

By 2010, it was selling its own vehicles under the GAC Trumpchi brand. In 2021, GAIG was included in the Fortune World 500 ranking of the world's largest and highest valued companies, ranking 176th.

== Holdings ==
The company has ownership in a number of Chinese automakers.

=== Guangzhou Automobile Group Co Ltd ===
Guangzhou Automobile Group Co Ltd (SEHK: 2238) was founded in 1997, and by 2005 it had become a holding of GAIG. As of 2009, it is the 6th largest automaker in China.

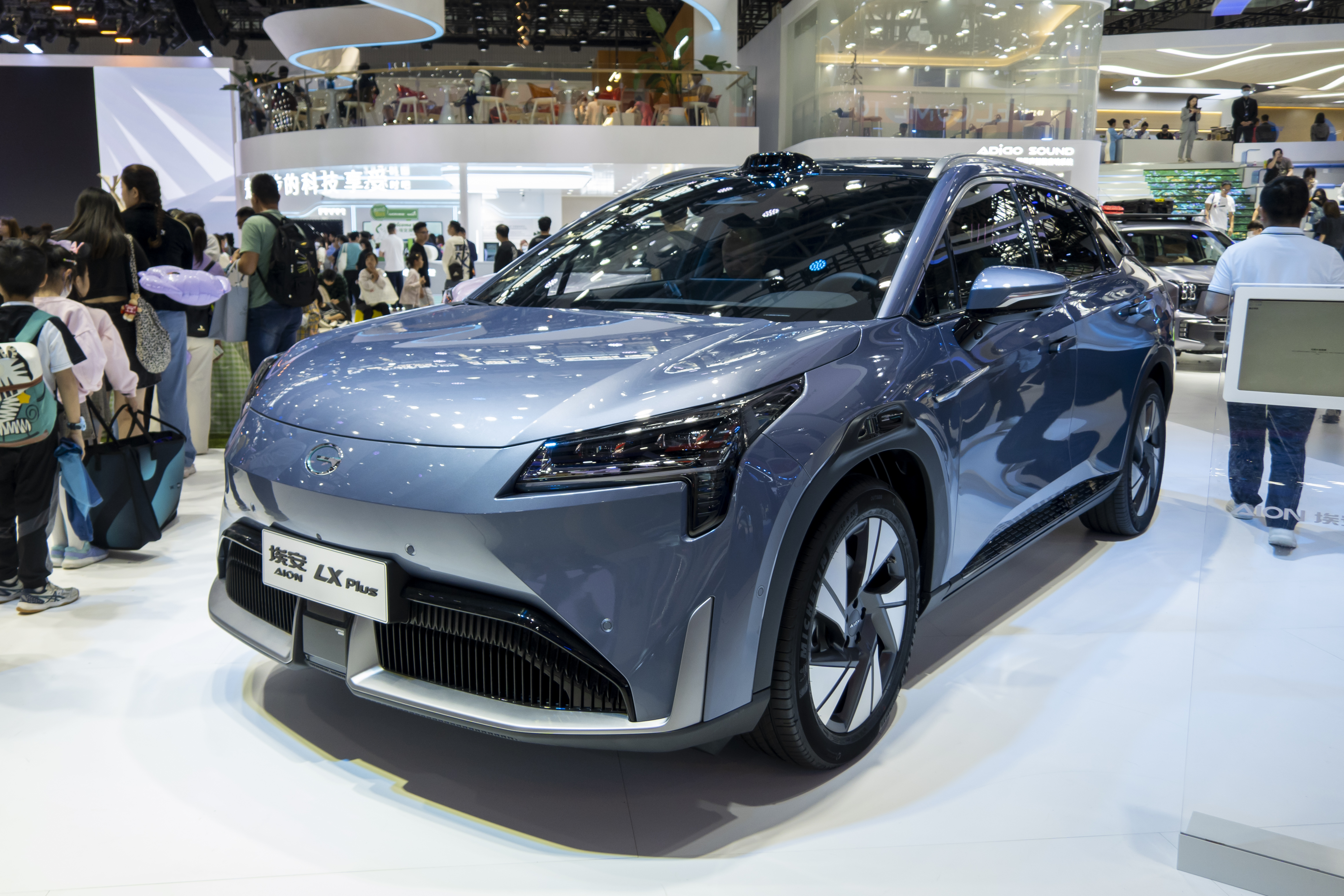
Aion LX Plus

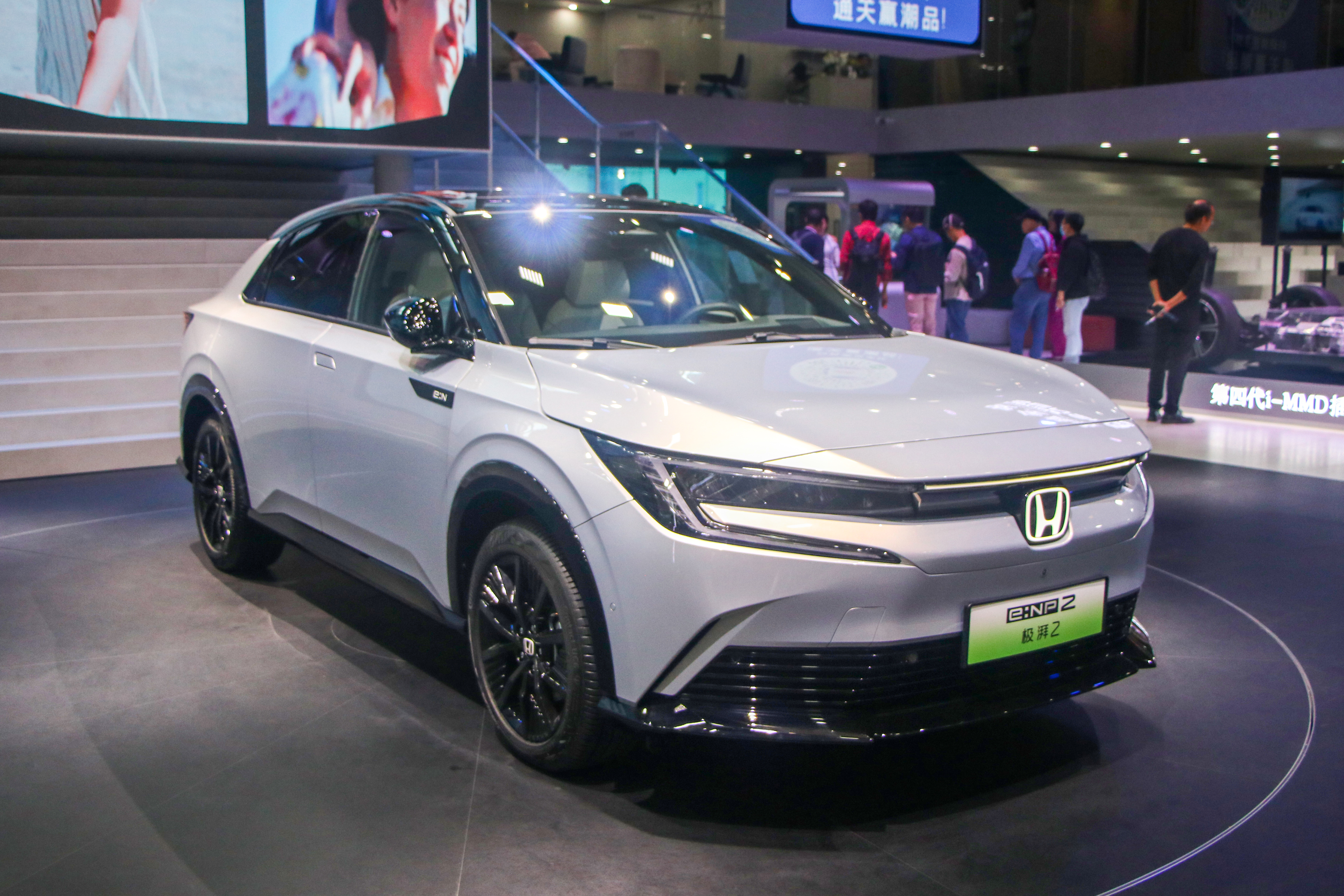
Honda eNP2
