= Guangzhou Auto =

Guangzhou Auto may refer to:

- Auto Guangzhou (auto show)
- Guangzhou Automobile (auto manufacturer)
