= GAC Group =

Chinese state-owned car manufacturer

Guangzhou Automobile Group

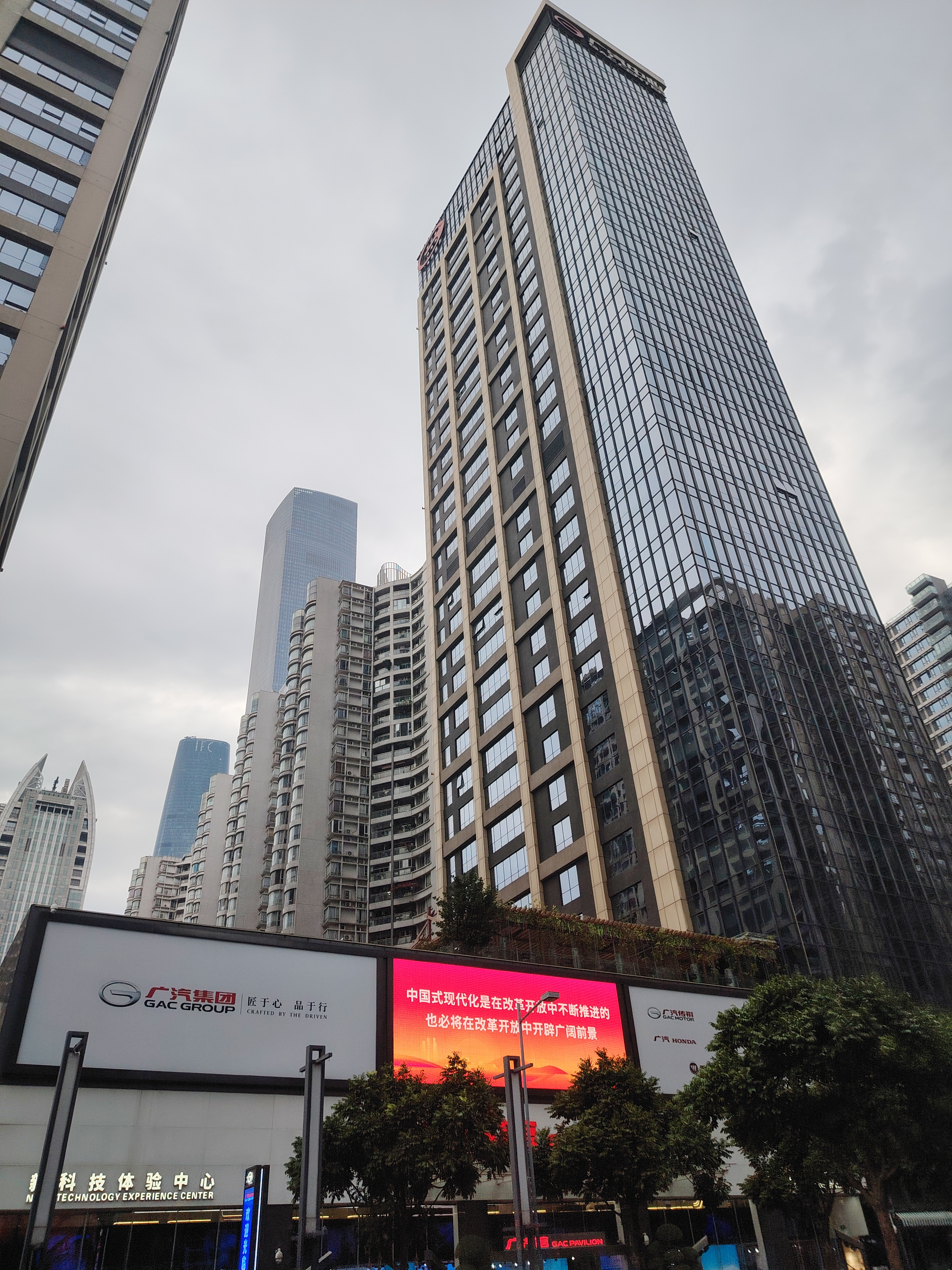
- GAC Center, the former headquarters of GAC Group
- Type: Public
- Traded as: SEHK: 2238, SSE: 601238
- Industry: Automotive
- Founded: 1948; 78 years ago
- Headquarters: Guangzhou, Guangdong, China
- Area served: China
- Key people: Feng Xingya (Chairman)
- Products: Passenger cars; Commercial vehicles; Buses; Automotive components
- Production output: ▼1,916,615 vehicles (2025)
- Services: Vehicle leasing; After-sale services; Vehicle finance
- Revenue: 12,964,000,000 renminbi (2012)
- Net income: 1,134,000,000 renminbi (2012)
- Owner: Provincial Government of Guangdong
- Parent: Guangzhou Automobile Industry Group
- Subsidiaries: GAC Aion; GAC Trumpchi / GAC Motor; GAC Commercial Vehicle; GAC Toyota (50%); GAC Honda (50%)

Chinese name
- Simplified Chinese: 广州汽车集团股份有限公司
- Traditional Chinese: 廣州汽車集團股份有限公司
- Literal meaning: Guangzhou Automobile Group Co., Ltd.
Transcriptions
Standard Mandarin
- Hanyu Pinyin: Guǎngzhōu Qìchē Jítuán Gǔfèn Yǒuxiàn Gōngsī
- Website: gac.com.cn

GAC Group logo
(2005–2010)

GAC Group logo
(2010–2020)

Guangzhou Automobile Group Co., Ltd. (GAC Group) is a Chinese state-owned automobile manufacturer headquartered in Guangzhou, Guangdong. As of 2021, it was the fifth largest automobile manufacturer in China, with 2.144 million sales in 2021.

The company produces and sells vehicles under its own branding, such as Hyptec, Trumpchi, Aion, Hycan as well as under foreign-branded joint ventures such as GAC Toyota and GAC Honda. It also produces electric vehicles under some of the previously listed brandings. It produces buses under the GAC Bus brand. Other brand names associated with GAC are Everus, for consumer vehicles, and Hino.

In 2021, GAC was the fourth largest Chinese plug-in electric vehicle manufacturer in the Chinese market, with 4% of market share. It sold 123,660 units of EVs in 2021, and over 20,000 units in March 2022, with plans to double EV production capacity to 400,000 a year by December 2022.

== History ==
Tongsheng Machining Plant, the predecessor of Guangzhou automobile manufacturing plant, was founded in 1948, and in 2005 become a holding of Guangzhou Automobile Industry Group and a joint-stock company. As of 2009, it was the 6th-largest automaker in China.

In 2009, the company acquired 29% of the Chinese sport-utility vehicle maker Changfeng Automobile, becoming its biggest shareholder. GAC purchased the remaining portion of Changfeng in 2011 completing its acquisition of the company.

Previously a backdoor listing via Denway Motors, GAC became listed under its own name on the Stock Exchange of Hong Kong in 2010. In that year shareholders of Denway Motors approved its privatization by GAC. Denway Motors was subsequently delisted on 25 August 2010 and replaced by Guangzhou Automobile Group (SEHK: 2238) on 30 August 2010 via stock swap.

In late 2010 GAC purchased 51% ownership of Gonow, a midsize Chinese automaker of sport-utility vehicles, subcompacts, and pickup trucks.

In December 2010 GAC launched the new Trumpchi marque. Its initial product was based on the Alfa Romeo 166.

In 2010 GAC was among the ten largest Chinese carmakers reaching number six and selling 724,200 vehicles.

2011 saw the company retain its position as the sixth-largest Chinese automaker by production volume, with GAC making 740,400 vehicles in that year.

In early 2012, the company was listed on the Shanghai Stock exchange.

On 17 November 2023, GAC Group announced the independent development of key technologies, including all-solid-state batteries, cobalt-free batteries, low-cobalt batteries, and sodium-ion batteries. The company aims to achieve the integration of all-solid-state batteries into automobiles by 2026.

In 2023 the company developed the first ammonia powered engine for cars.

In November 2023, GAC Group and Huawei signed a cooperation agreement that GAC would create a new high-end electric brand in addition to Trumpchi, Aion and Hyptec, both sides will cooperate in product development, marketing and ecological services.

On 2 November 2024, GAC Group's headquarters moved from the GAC Center in the CBD of Zhujiang New Town to Panyu Auto City.

=== Collaboration with Huawei ===
In March 2025, GAC Group established Huawang Automotive Technology (Guangzhou) Co., Ltd. (trade as Huawang Automotive). The company will collaborate with Huawei to develop an independent high-end automotive brand. Huawang's new models will incorporate Huawei's intelligent driving software, smart cockpit systems, and intelligent vehicle control solutions.

In August 2025, GAC Group announced that its controlling subsidiary, GAC Aion, invested 600 million yuan in Huawang Automotive. Upon completion of the capital increase, GAC Group directly holds 71.43% of the equity in Huawang and indirectly holds 28.57% through GAC Aion. GAC Group stated that Huawang Automobile will collaborate with Huawei's IPD (Integrated Product Development) and IPMS (Integrated Product Marketing and Sales) systems, covering aspects from product definition and marketing to ecosystem services. The sales operations will be handled by a new team within the joint venture company.

In September 2025, Huawei and GAC Group officially launched the Qijing brand (Chinese: 启境) operated by Huawang Automotive. It will deeply integrated with Huawei in areas such as technology, ecosystem development, and brand marketing.

=== Collaboration with FAW Group ===
In September 2026, GAC Group announced that it planned to acquire part of the equity of a vehicle joint venture held by FAW Group through the issuance of shares, and to raise supporting funds. Upon completion of the transaction, FAW Group will become the second largest shareholder of GAC Group.

== Leadership ==
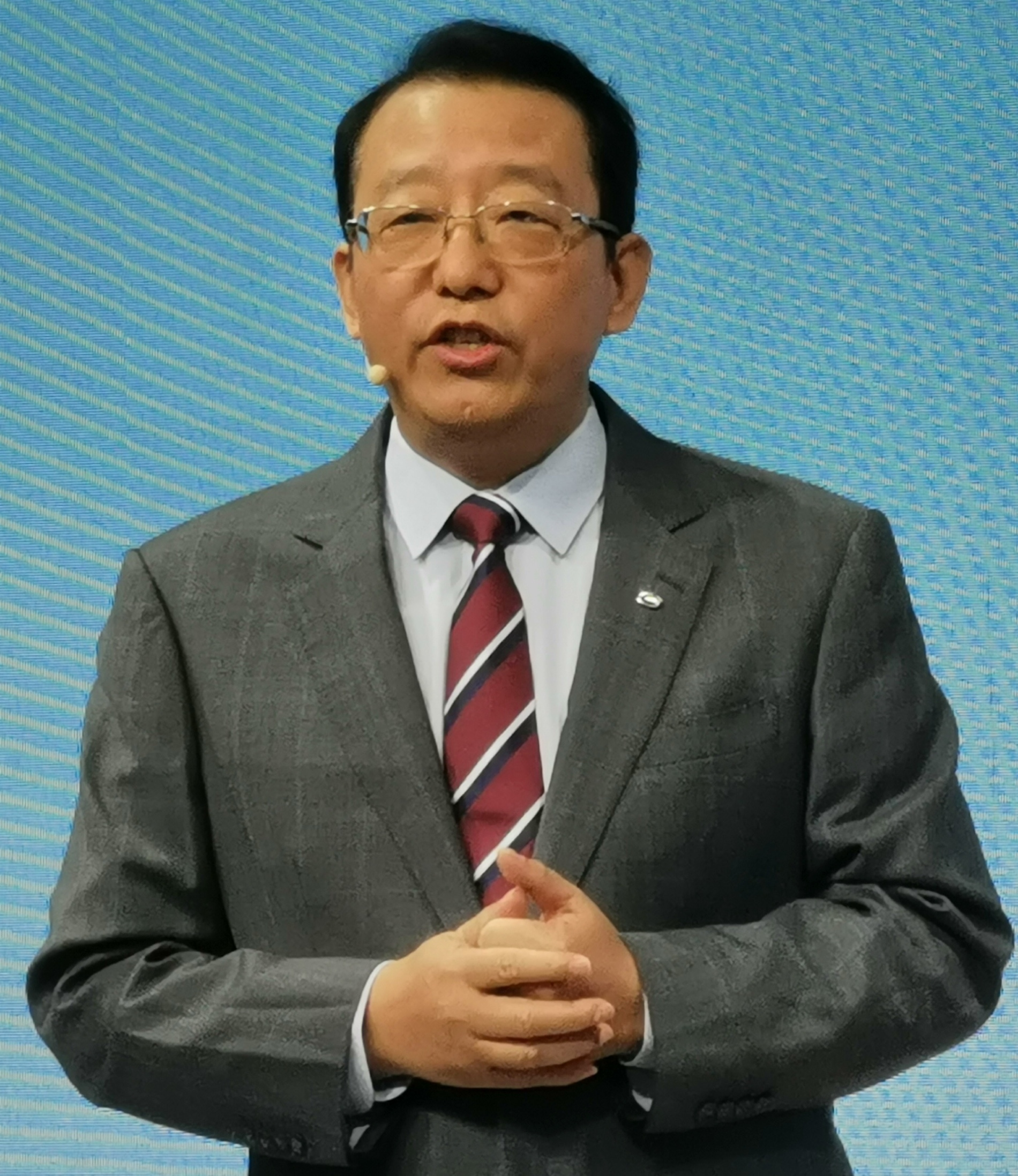
Feng Xingya (2025)

- Zhang Fangyou (1998–2016)
- Zeng Qinghong (2016–2025)
- Feng Xingya (2025–present)

== Brands ==
=== Current ===
==== Trumpchi/GAC ====
Trumpchi is an automotive marque owned by GAC Group and launched in December 2010. Trumpchi brand is marketed as GAC outside China. It was launched in December 2010. The Trumpchi brand is operated in Chinese domestic market while it is rebranded as GAC Motor in overseas markets.

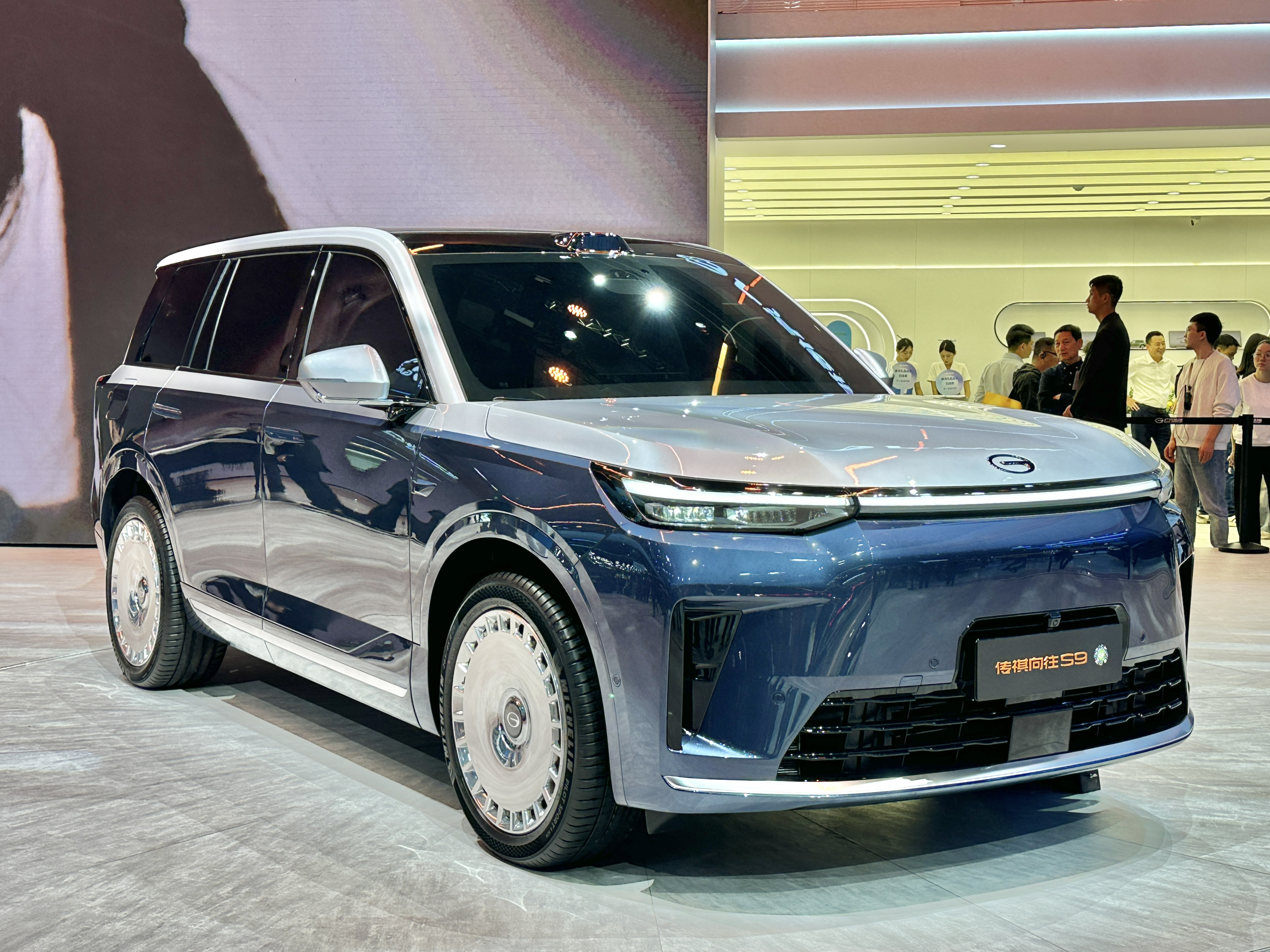
Trumpchi Xiangwang S9

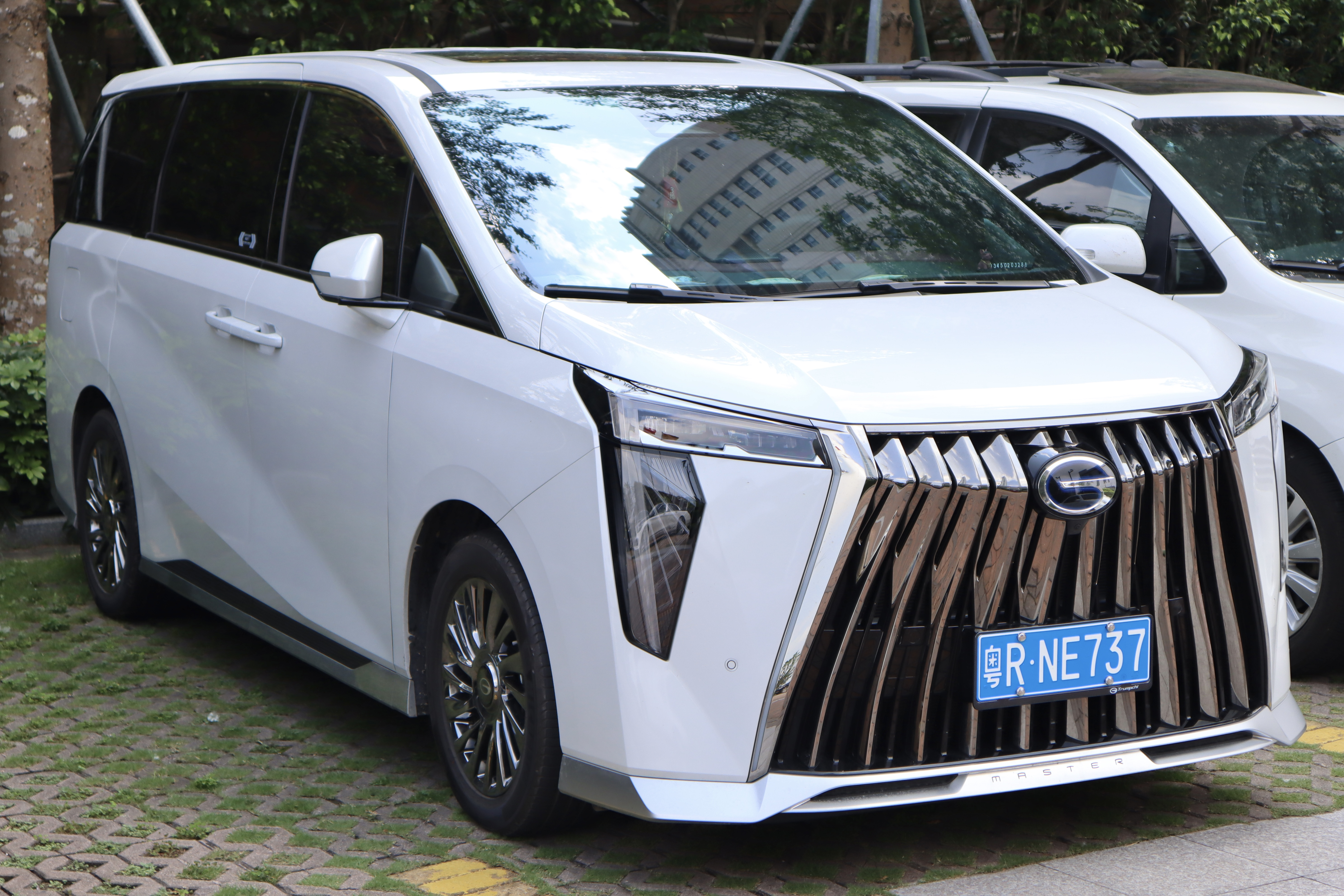
Trumpchi M8 II

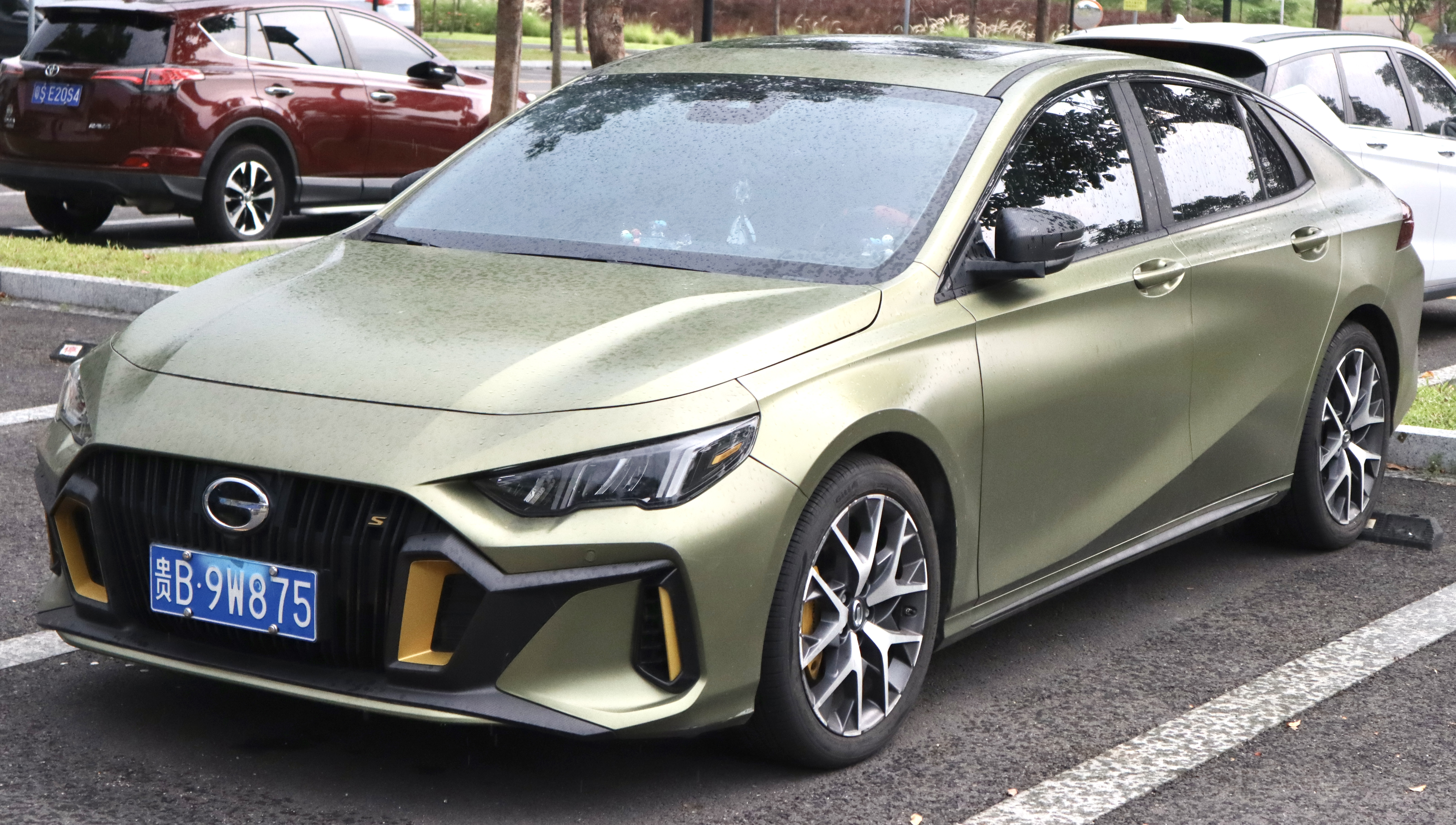
Trumpchi Empow

==== Aion ====
Aion is the mainstream brand of GAC Aion, the subsidiary for electric vehicle of GAC Group. It was founded in 2017 as the GAC New Energy Automobile. Its current name was adopted in November 2020. It produces battery electric vehicles under the premium Hyptec brand and the eponymous Aion brand.

As of 2023, GAC Aion is the third-largest battery electric vehicle brand after Tesla and BYD Auto, both in China and globally by producing 480,003 vehicles.

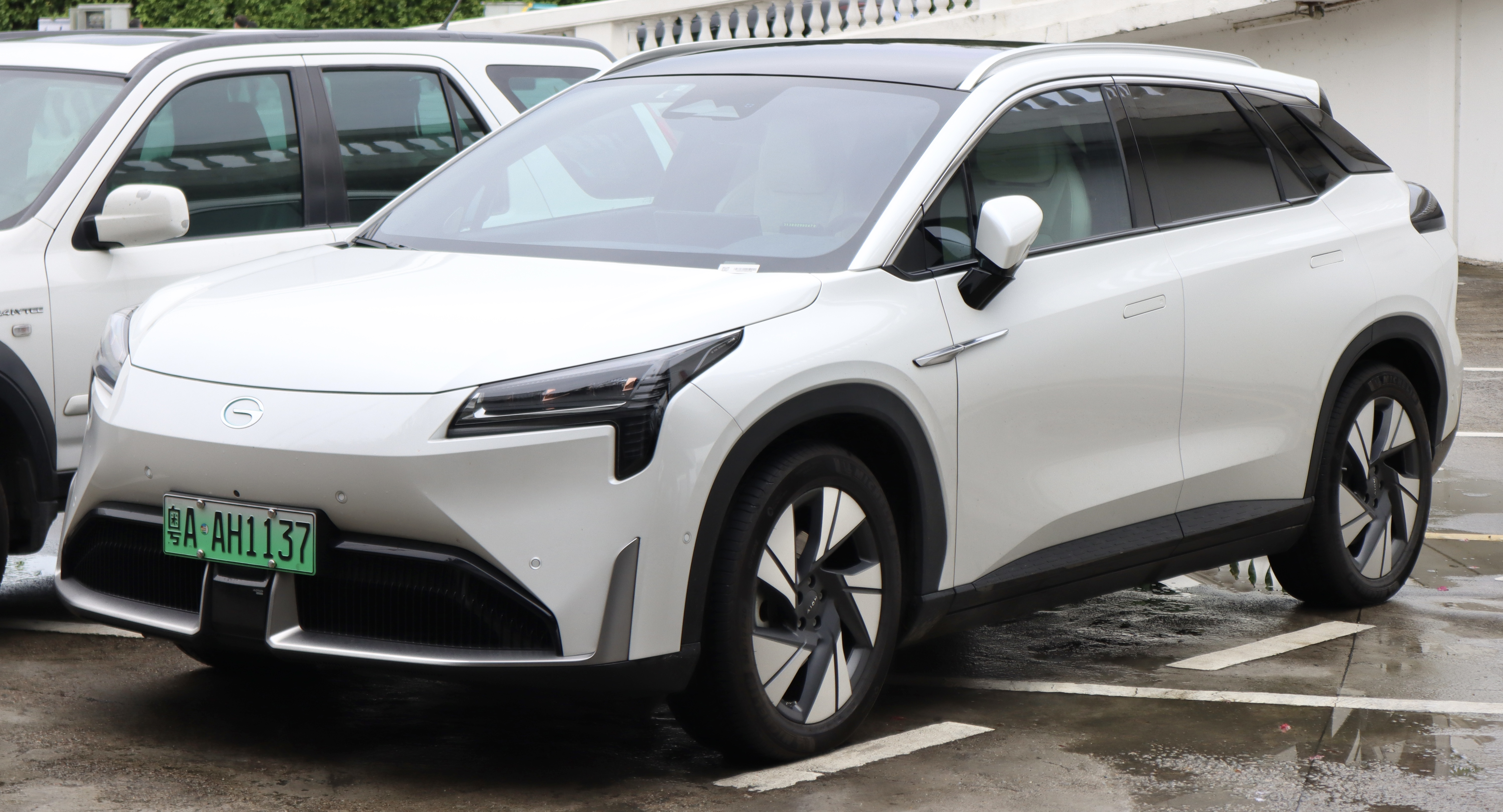
Aion LX

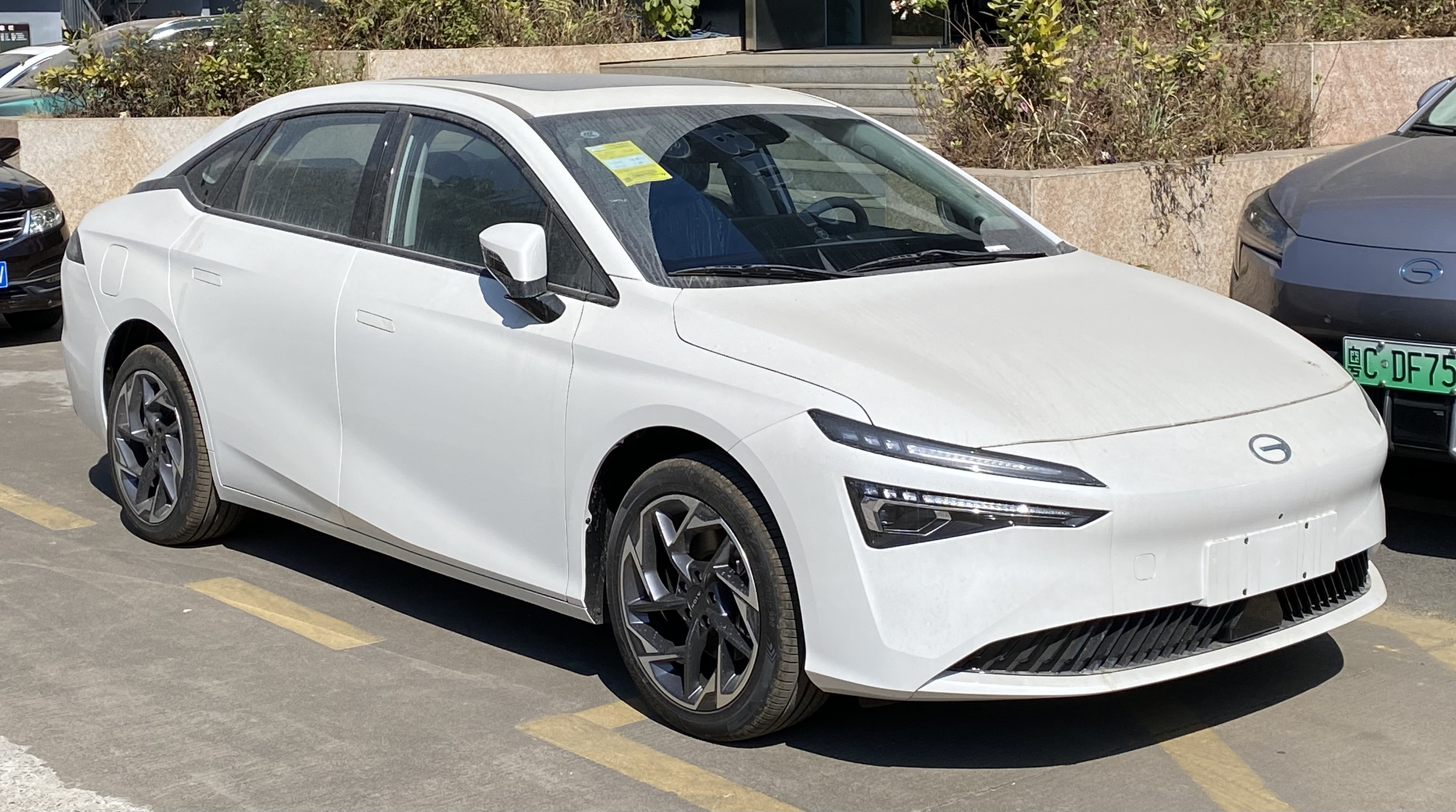
Aion S Max

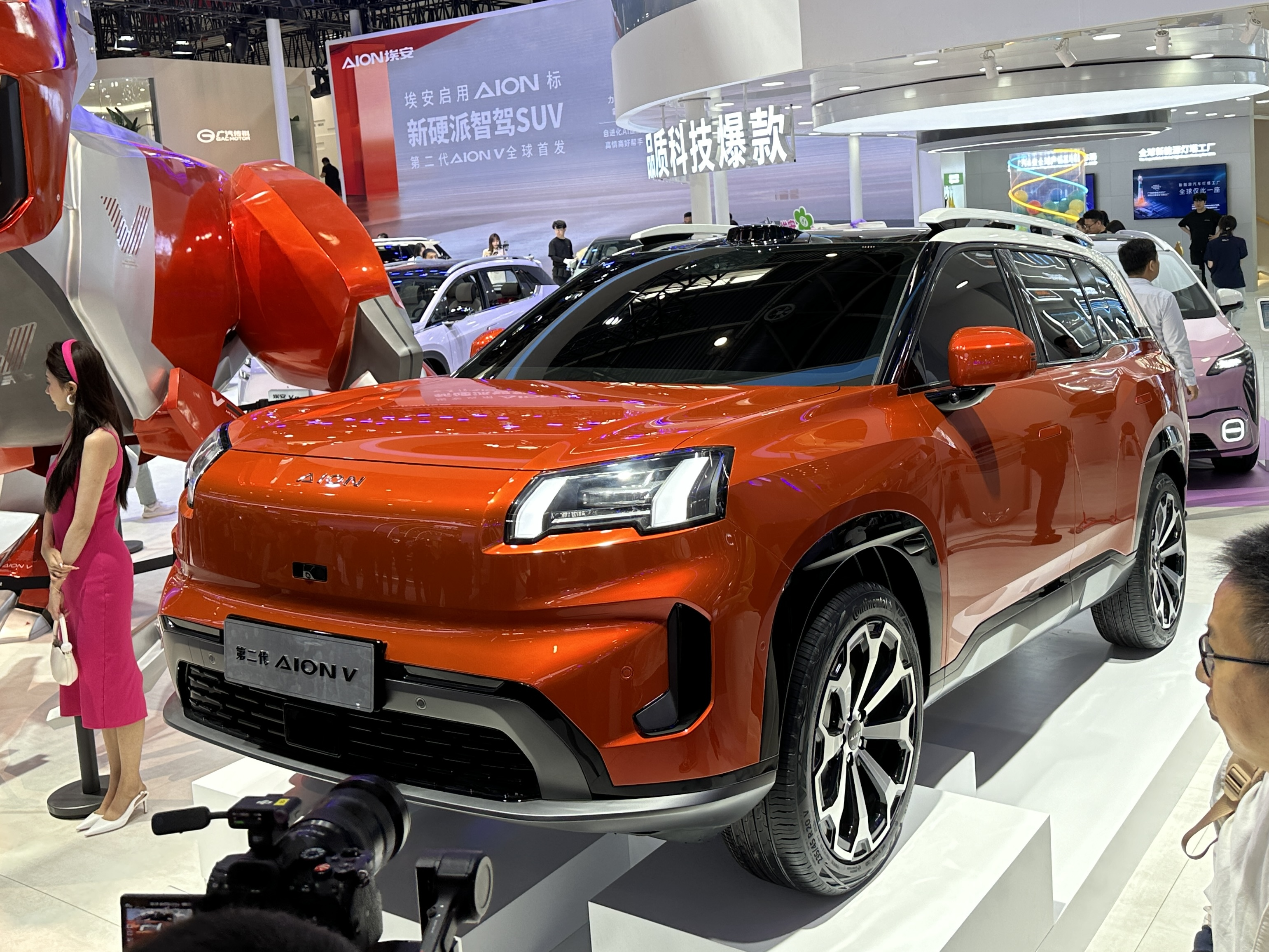
Aion V

==== Hyptec ====
Hyptec is the premium brand under GAC Aion. The brand was created in September 2022 as Hyper, with a goal to expand GAC Aion's portfolio with a separate premium brand.

Hyptec's first product is the Hyptec SSR sports car. Production of the SSR began in October 2023. In 2023, the Hyper lineup was further expanded with a second model, the Hyptec GT sedan, which went on sale in July 2023. In October of the same year, the mid-size SUV coupe Hyptec HT debuted, with sales beginning in the domestic market in November 2023. In August 2024, the brand's Western name was changed from Hyper to Hyptec.

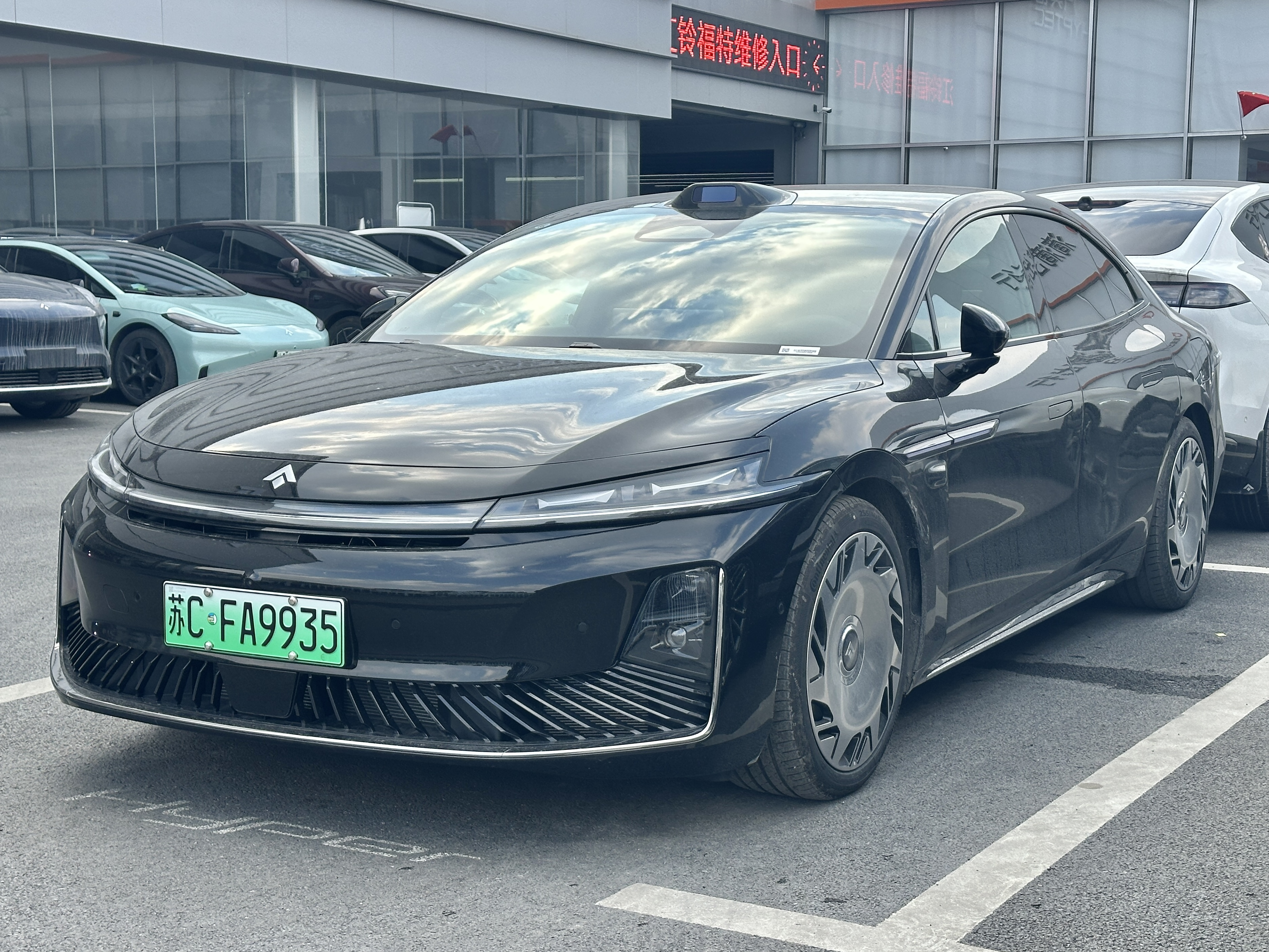
Hyptec A800

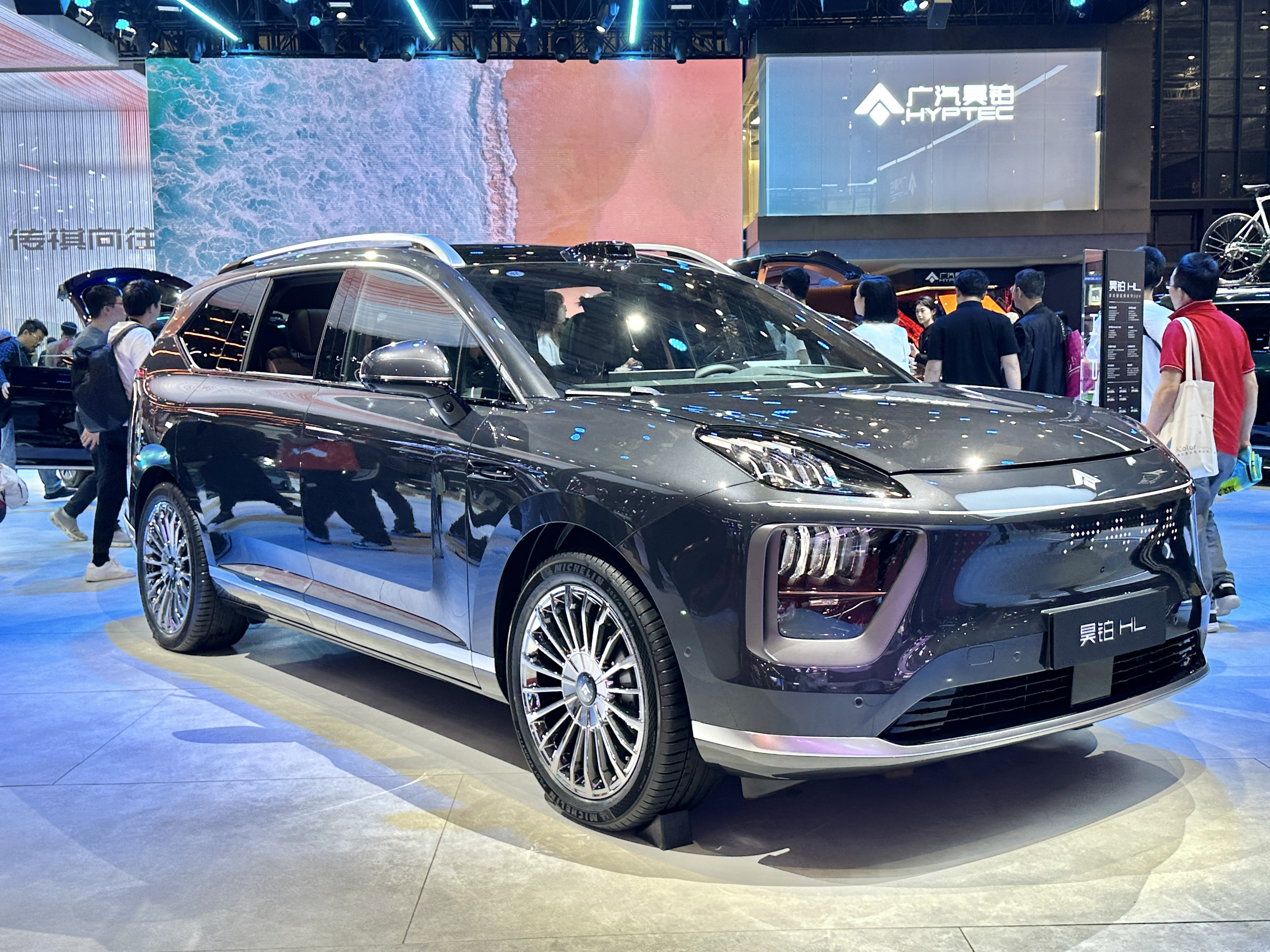
Hyptec HL

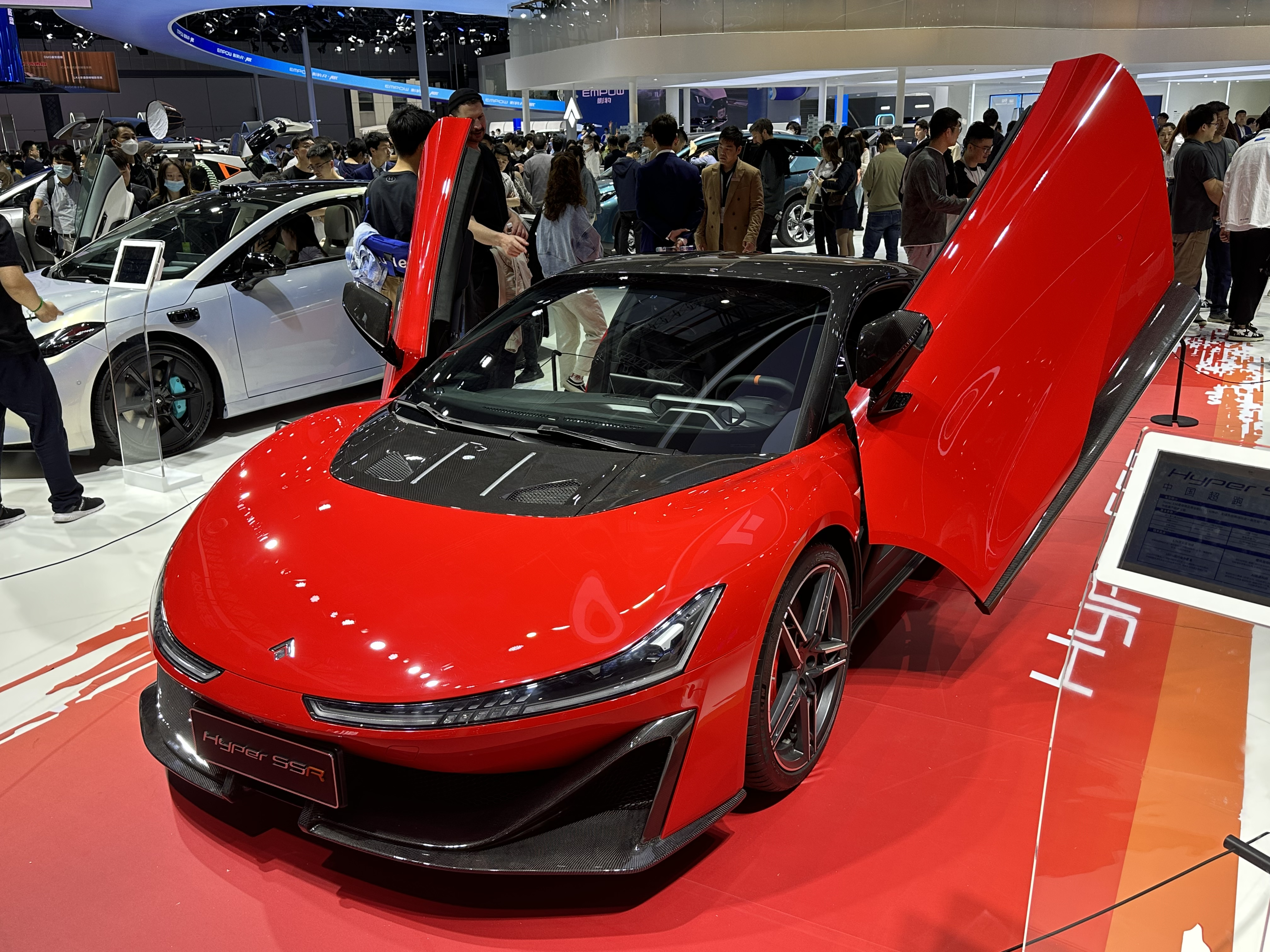
Hyptec SSR

==== Aistaland ====
The Aistaland or Qijing brand, launched on September 19, 2025, is operated by Huawang Automotive with collaboration from Huawei. Its first vehicle is the Aistaland GT7.

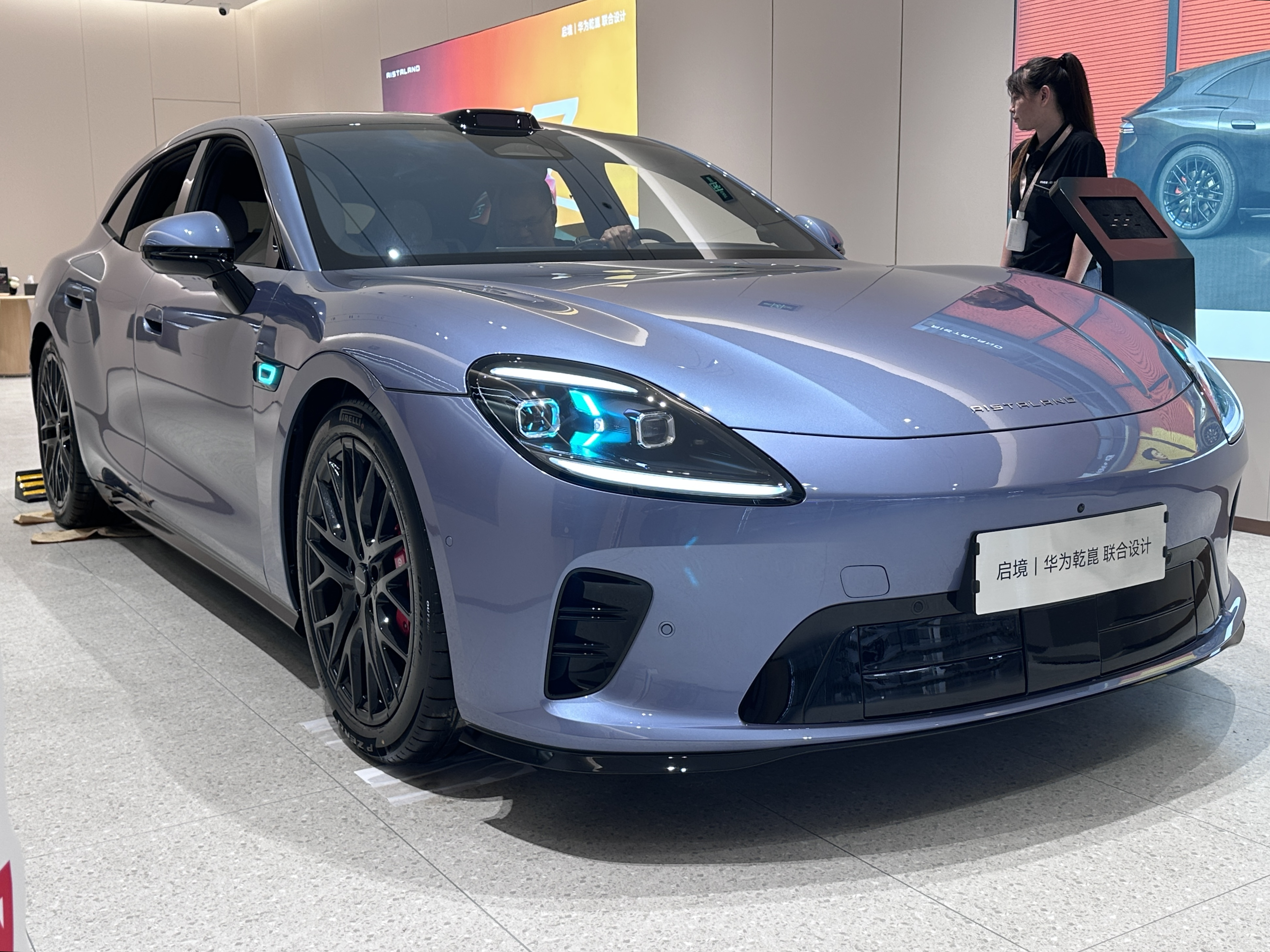
Aistaland GT7

==== GAC Commercial Vehicle ====
GAC Commercial Vehicle is a brand of GAC Group targeted at manufacturing commercial electric vehicles. It used to be a joint venture between Hino and GAC for producing Hino-based trucks and was acquired by GAC Group in 2024.

=== Former ===
==== Changfeng Motor (Leopaard) ====
In 2009, GAC bought 29% ownership of Changfeng Motor. The purchase was supposedly imposed by the Chinese state as a condition of a then-upcoming joint venture with Fiat. GAC completed its acquisition of Changfeng in 2011. In 2012, Changfeng Group began moves to re-enter the vehicle business culminating in the move to a new headquarters in Changsha in January 2013 and the establishment of a new subsidiary, Hunan Liebao Automobile Co. Ltd., alongside the continuing Anhui Changfeng Yangzi Automobile Manufacturing Co., Ltd., to oversee manufacturing and marketing of vehicles under the Liebao or "Leopaard" brand.

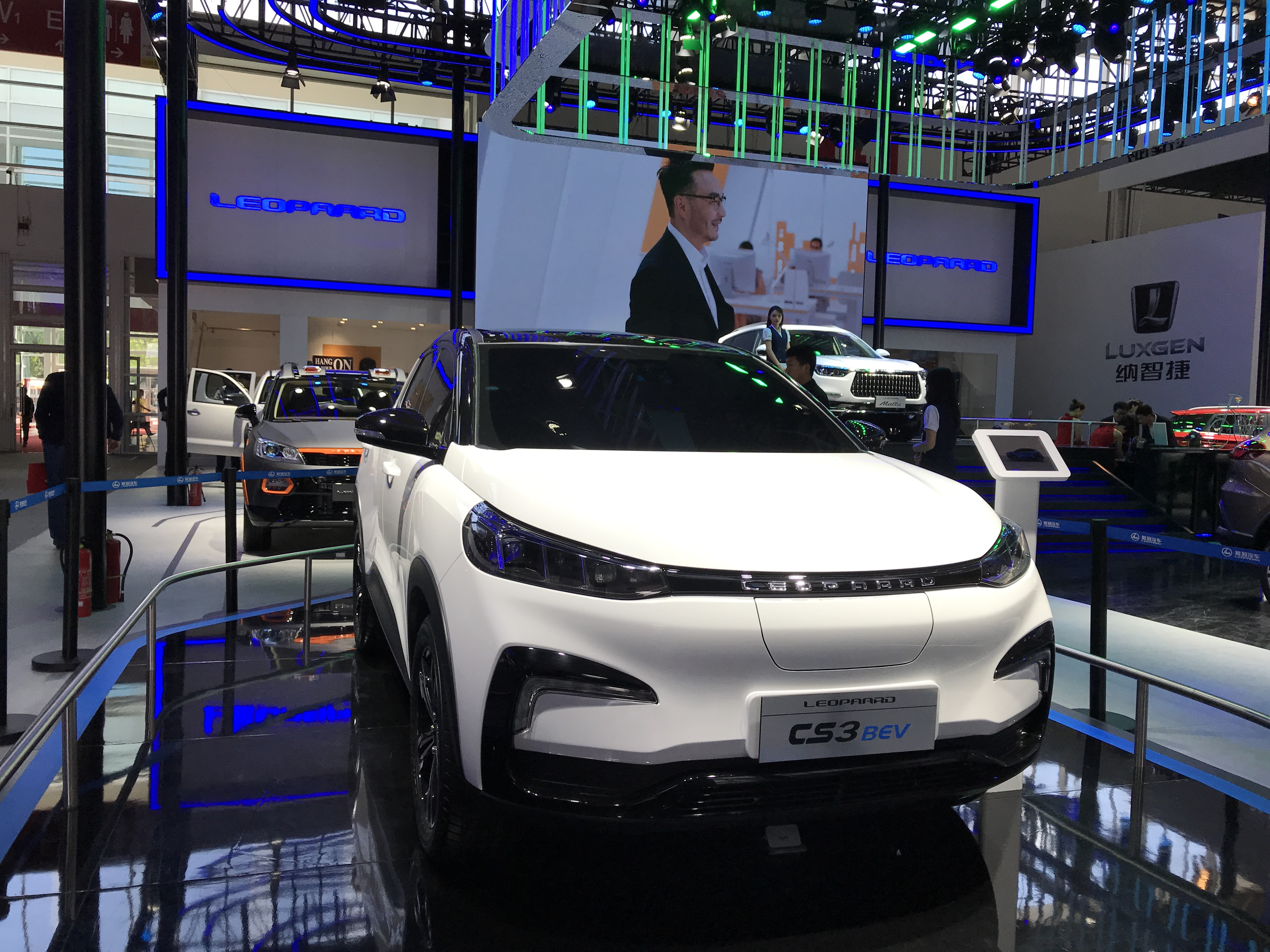
Leopaard CS3 BEV

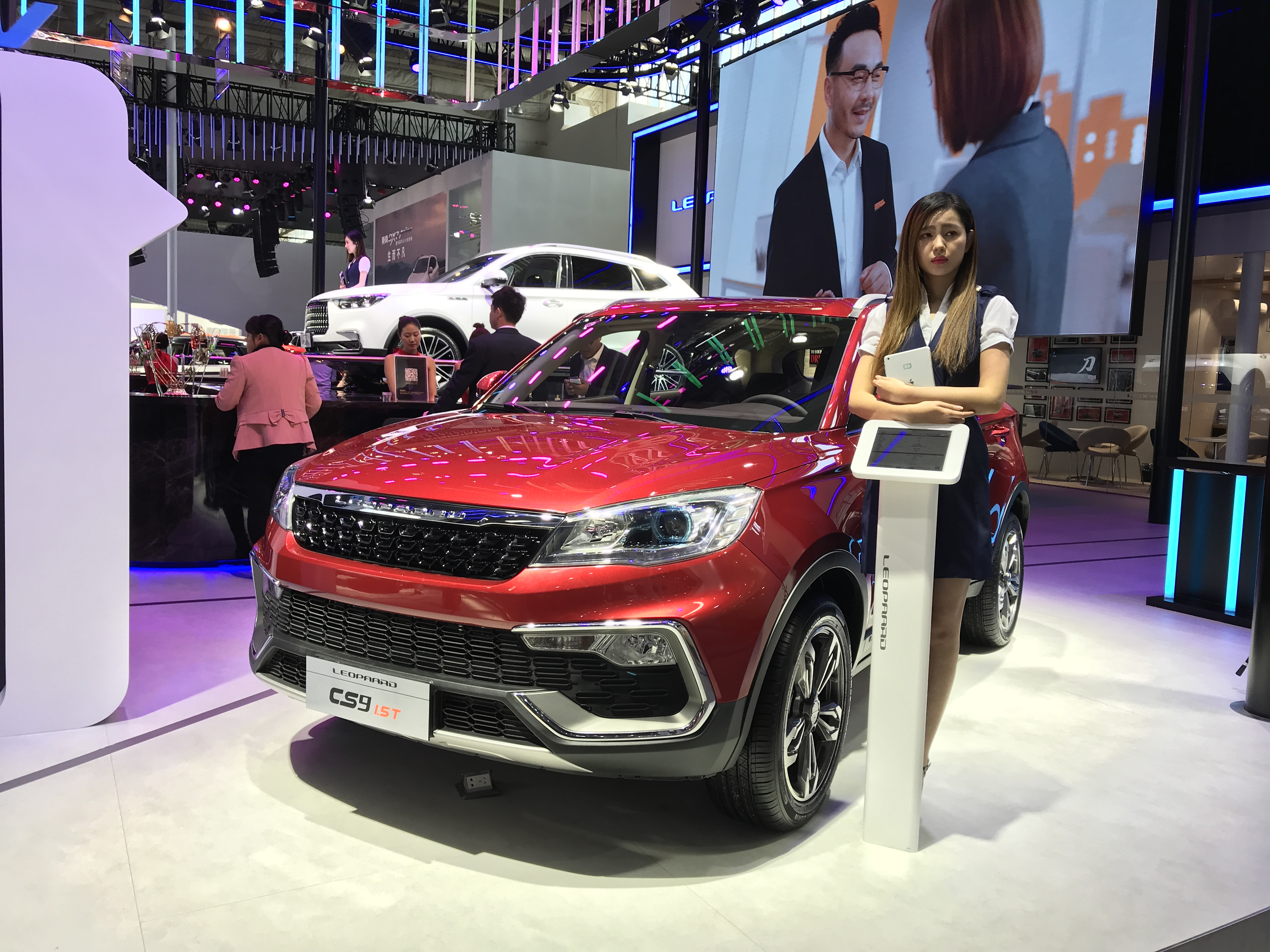
Leopaard CS9

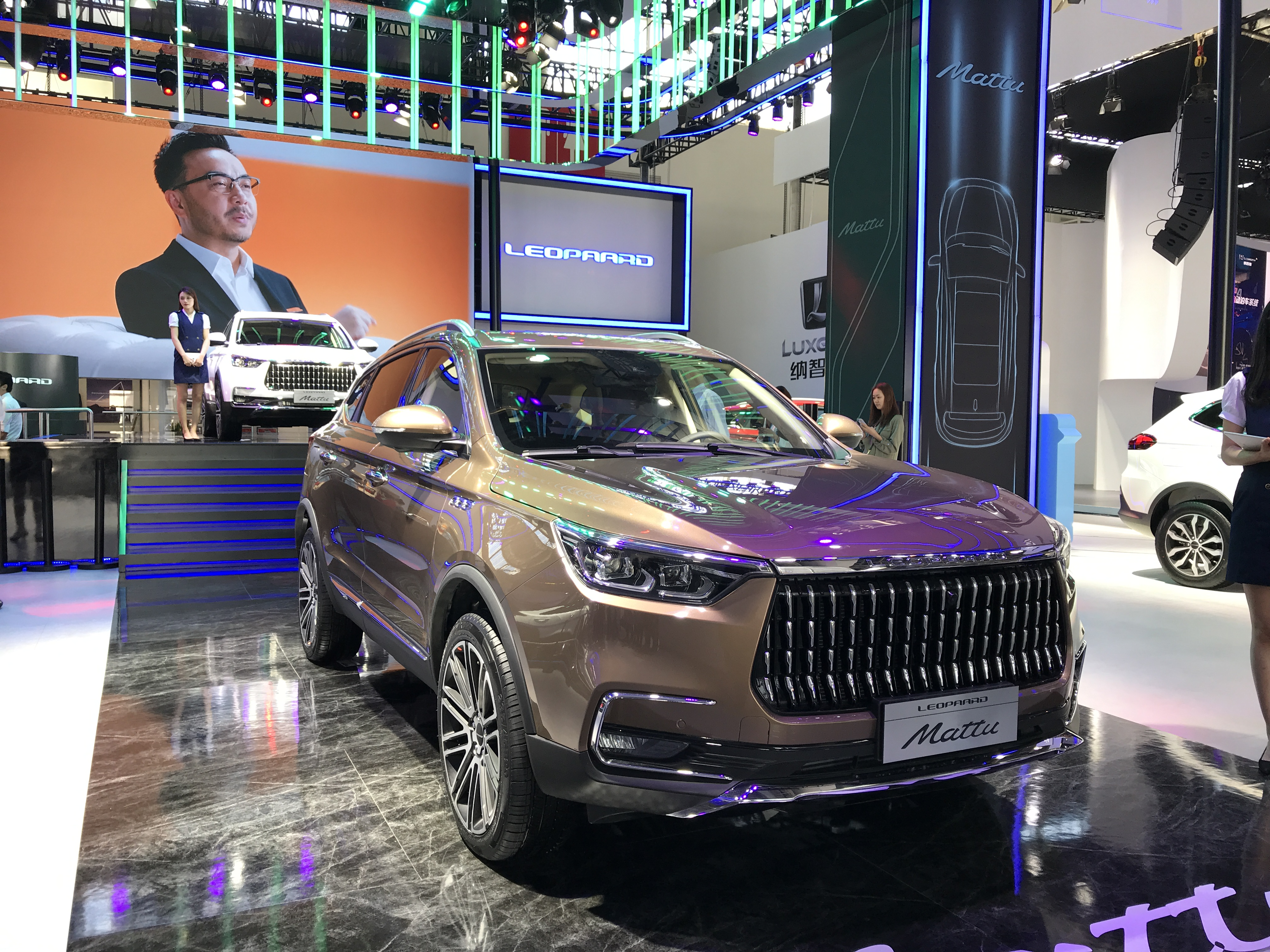
Leopaard Mattu

==== Gonow ====
Gonow (officially Zhejiang Gonow Auto Co., Ltd.) is a Chinese manufacturer of automobiles, commercial vehicles and SUV's headquartered in Taizhou, Zhejiang and a subsidiary of GAC Group. It markets its products under the brand name GAC Gonow in China and as Gonow in other markets.

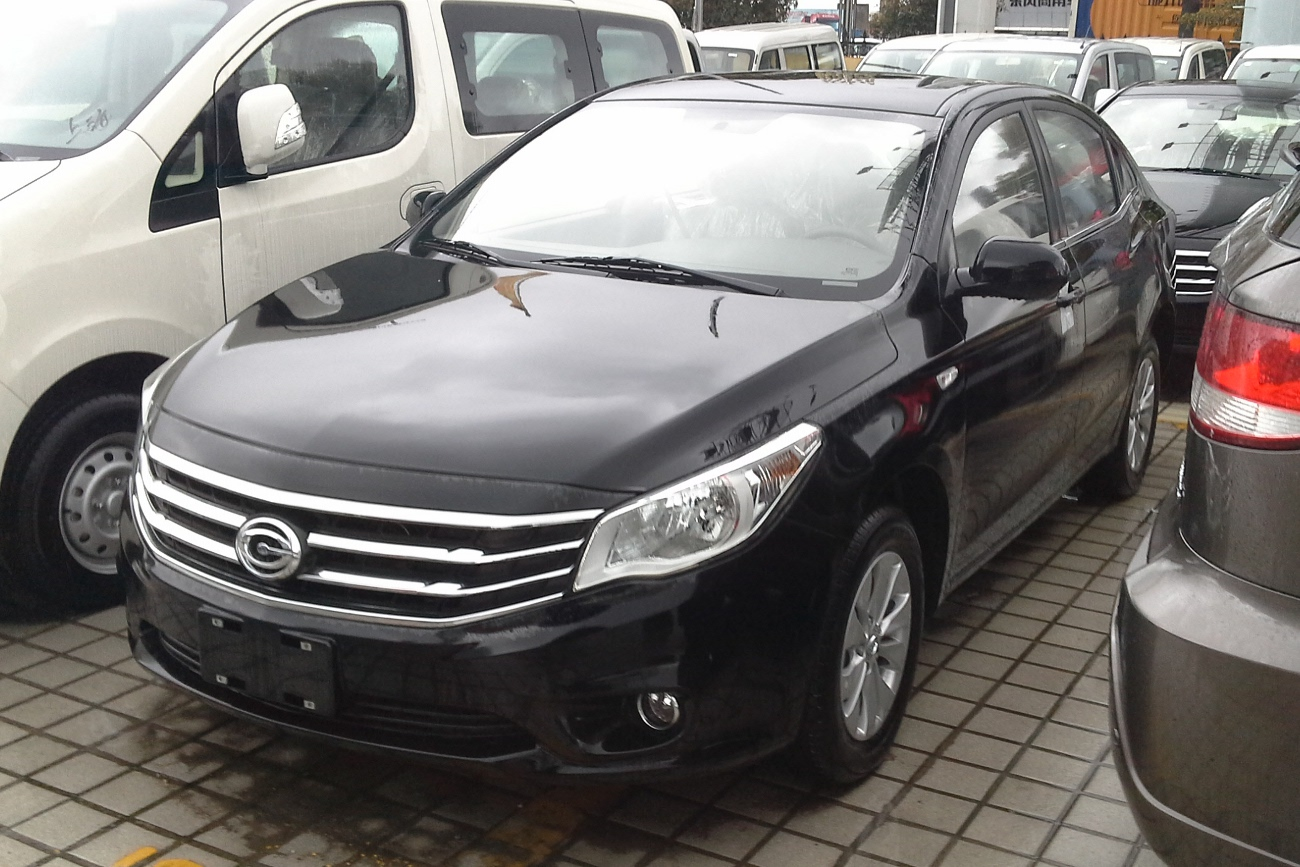
Gonow Emei

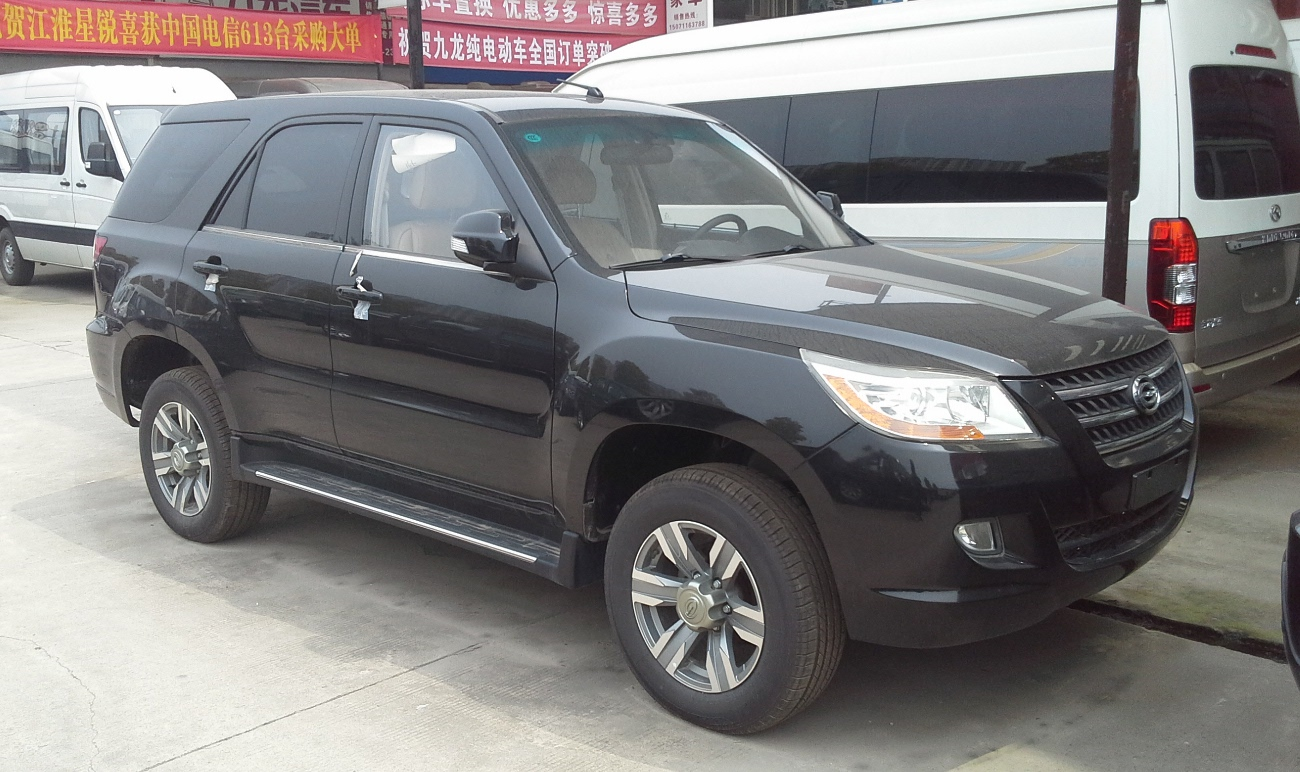
Gonow G5

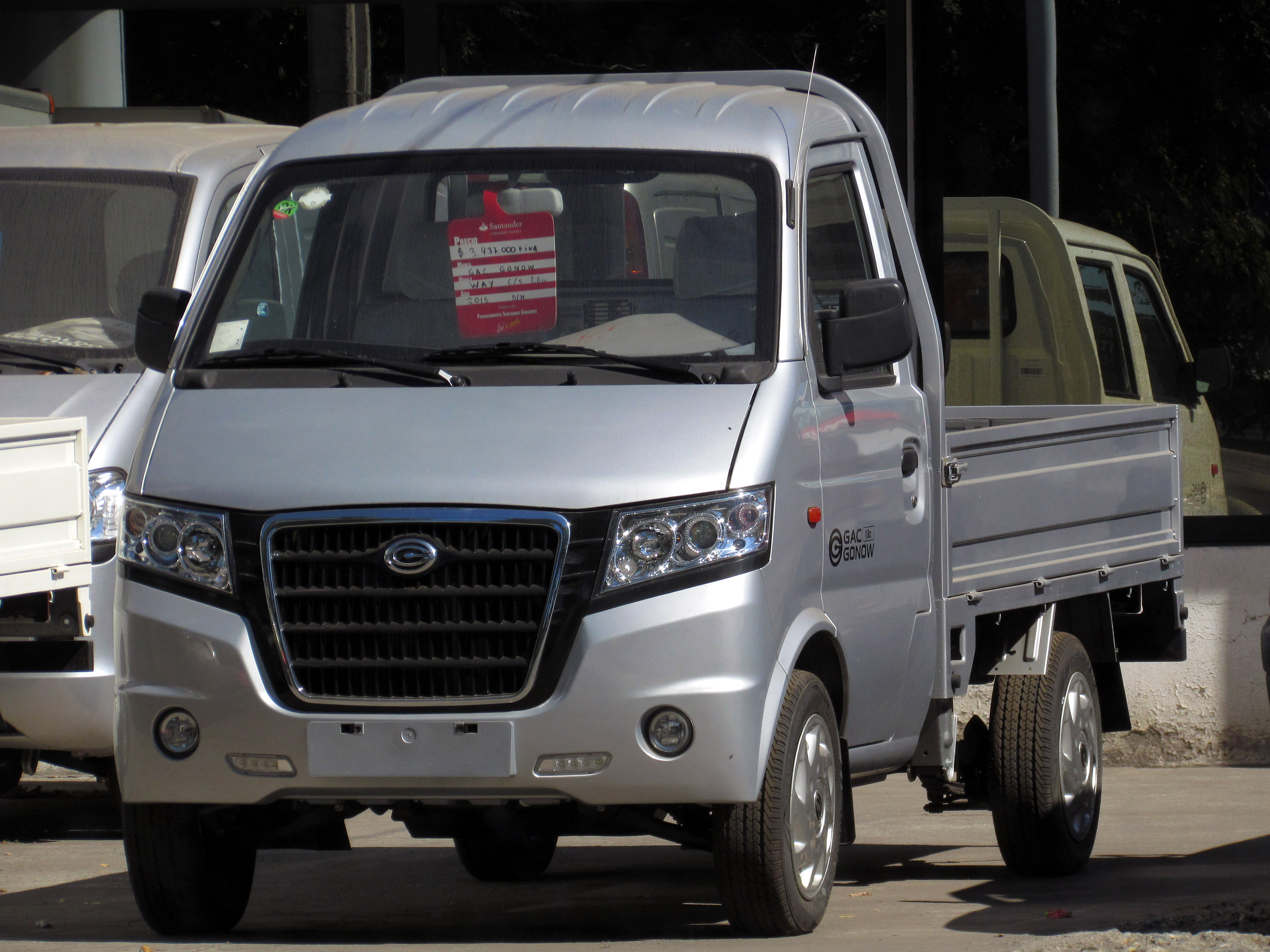
Gonow Way M1

== Joint ventures ==
=== Current ===
==== GAC Honda ====
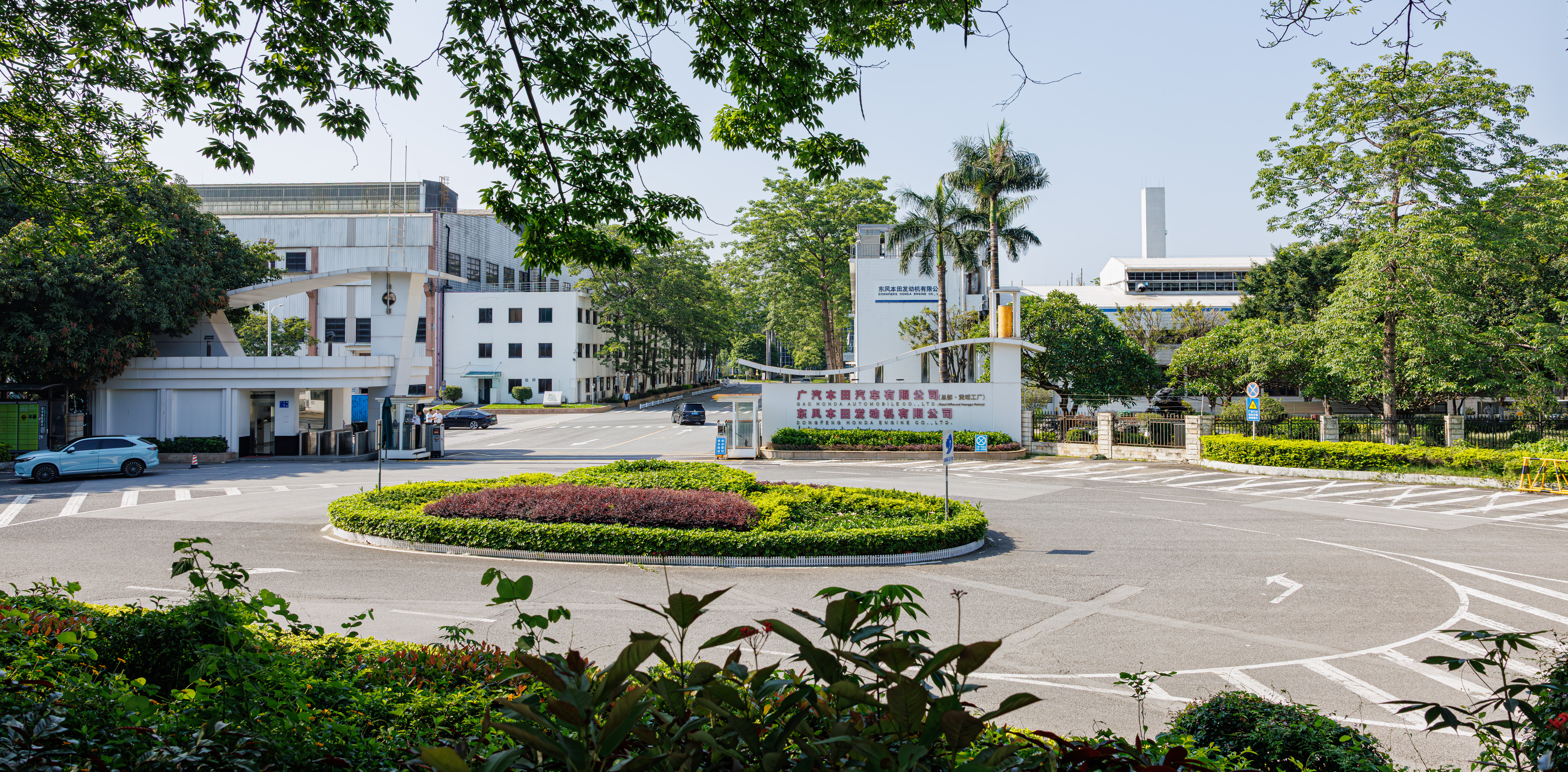
GAC Honda facility in Huangpu, Guangzhou

GAC Honda, formerly Guangqi Honda is a 50:50 joint venture between GAC and Honda. The company produces Honda vehicles for the Chinese market since 1999. It started sales of its own brand, Everus in 2011.

==== GAC Wuyang-Honda ====
Wuyang-Honda markets Honda Motorcycles for the Chinese market.

==== GAC Toyota ====
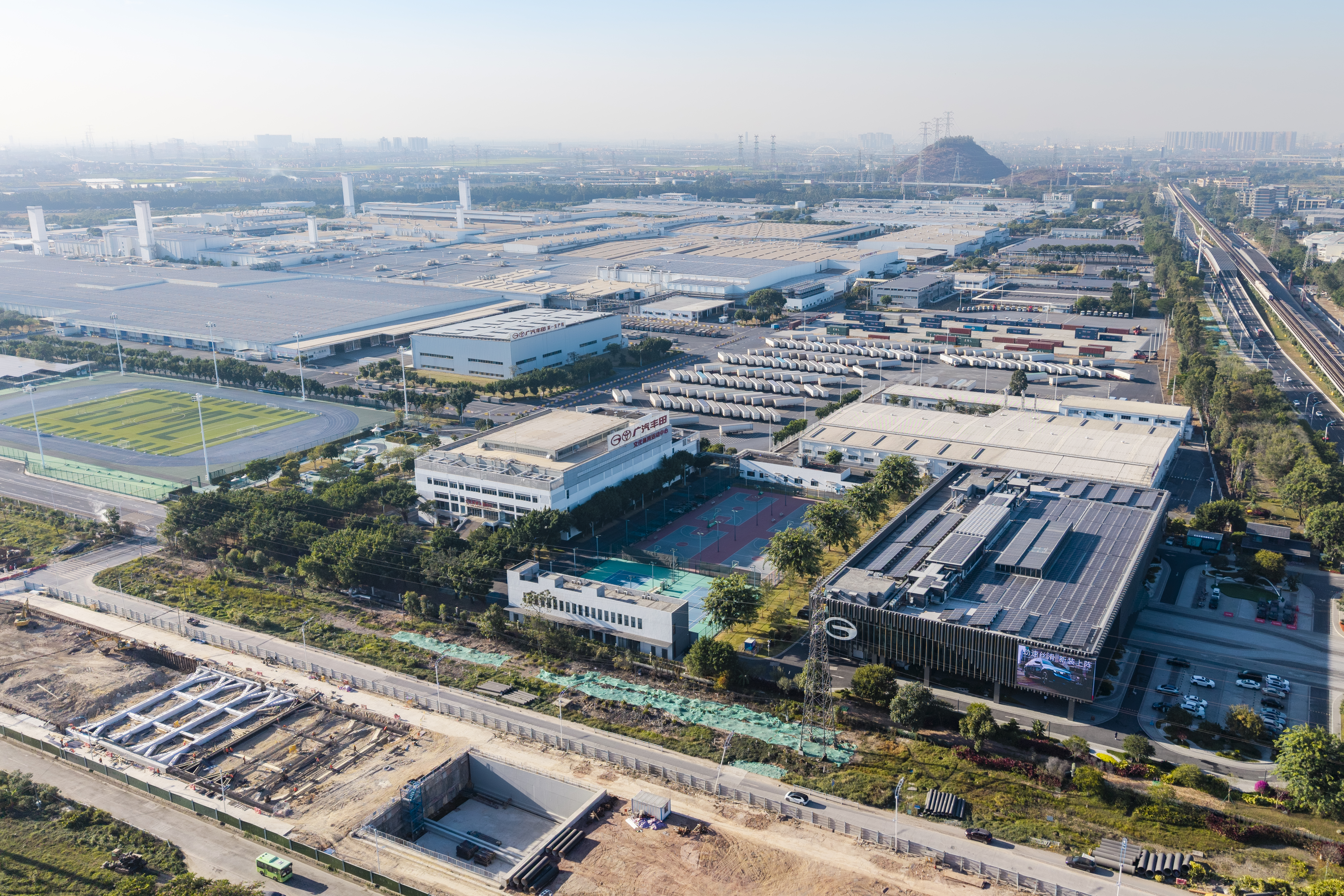
GAC Toyota facility in Nansha, Guangzhou

GAC Toyota Motor Co., Ltd. is a 50:50 joint venture between GAC and Toyota Motor Company which manufactures Toyota vehicles for the Chinese market. It was founded in 2004 and is headquartered in Guangzhou.

=== Former ===
==== Guangzhou Isuzu ====
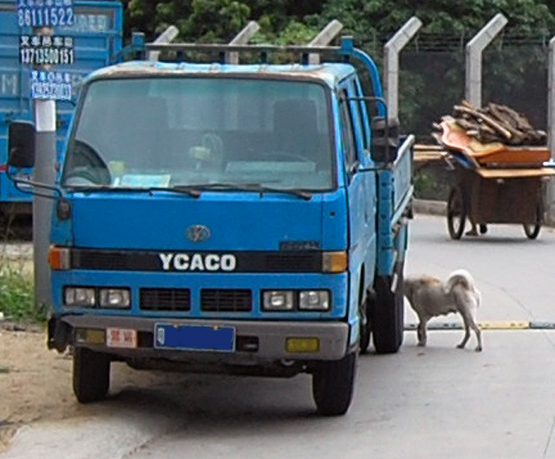
Ycaco YC1045CSZ

Guangzhou Isuzu Bus Co., Ltd. was a coach manufacturing joint venture between GAC (51%), Isuzu (33.67%) and Isuzu (China) Investment Co., Ltd. (15.33%) that was established on 6 March 2000. Isuzu light trucks and buses were also built by Guangzhou Yangcheng Automobile (羊城汽车), a joint venture with Hong Kong China Lounge Logistics. Their light trucks are based on the Isuzu Elf and are marketed under the "YCACO" brand. Yangcheng's various bus building operations were merged with Guangzhou Isuzu Bus and Denway into the Guangzhou Bus Co., Ltd. in September 2008. At the same time, Guangzhou Yangcheng's truck making arm was merged into Guangzhou Hino.

==== Guangzhou Peugeot ====
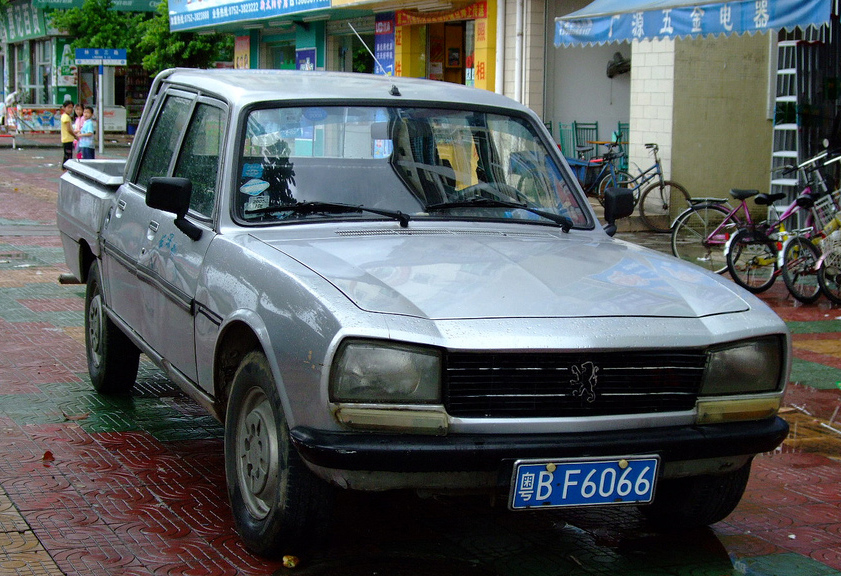
A crew cab Peugeot 504 pickup produced by Guangzhou Peugeot

One of the first Sino-western joint venture auto-making companies, Guangzhou Peugeot Automobile Co. Ltd. was a joint venture set up by PSA Peugeot Citroën and the Guangzhou Municipal government between 1985 and 1997. Over its eleven-year lifespan, the company produced about 100,000 cars.

Sales began in 1989 mainly as automobiles for government officials and taxis. Its model line comprised the Peugeot 505 and 504.

==== GAC Fiat Chrysler ====
Fiat signed on to a joint venture with GAC on 6 July 2009, and GAC FIAT Automobiles Co Ltd was incorporated on 9 March 2010. The new company has a production base in Changsha, Hunan Province, that opened on 28 June 2012 to manufacture the Fiat Viaggio.

==== GAC Mitsubishi ====
GAC Mitsubishi Motors is a joint venture between GAC and the Japanese automaker Mitsubishi Motors. It became operational in September 2012 following a late 2010 memorandum of understanding.

==== GAC BYD ====
GAC BYD is a joint venture between GAC (49%) and BYD (51%) to produce BYD-designed buses under GAC's brand name.

On 18 September 2024, the Ministry of Industry and Information Technology of the People's Republic of China issued an announcement that GAC BYD applied to cancel its automobile production qualifications and stopped producing and selling a batch of passenger cars and garbage trucks. On the same day, GAC Group listed its shares in GAC BYD for transfer.

==== GAC Hino ====
GAC Hino is a joint venture between Hino and GAC aimed at producing Hino brand trucks. In 2024, it was acquired by GAC Group and reconstructed into GAC Commercial Vehicle in 2025 for manufacturing electric commercial vehicles.

== Sales ==
GAC group sales by brand
Year	Total	Trumpchi	GAC Aion	Commercial Vehicle	Gonow
2010	45,065	21	-	-	43,251
2011	44,056	17,014	-	-	25,343
2012	71,505	32,646	-	-	37,256
2013	124,001	84,602	-	-	38,928
2014	146,694	116,468	-	-	29,500
2015	207,890	191,617	-	-	15,995
2016	375,723	370,781	-	-	4,209
2017	508,797	508,617	-	-	180
2018	535,323	535,277	-	-	46
2019	384,792	351,550	33,242	-	Discontinued
2020	353,597	294,049	59,545	-	Discontinued
2021	447,207	327,048	120,159	-	Discontinued
2022	633,704	362,548	271,156	-	Discontinued
2023	886,508	406,505	480,003	-	Discontinued
2024	789,475	414,591	374,884	-	Discontinued
2025	613,563	319,161	290,081	4,321	Discontinued

== International operations ==
GAC Group has been vocal about its plans to introduce models into the United States. Trumpchi made its first appearance at the North American International Auto Show in Detroit in January 2013, where the Trumpchi E-Jet concept made its world debut. In 2017, the company returned to Detroit and showed three SUVs and two sedans. In January 2018, Trumpchi brought five new models and a concept SUV, the Enverge. GAC established research and development teams in Silicon Valley and Los Angeles in 2017 and 2018, respectively. During the 2019 Detroit Auto Show they announced delays to their sales plans to the first half of 2020. On 22 May 2019, the company indefinitely postponed their US market plans due to Donald Trump's trade war with China.

On 15 May 2015, GAC Group launched a ceremony to celebrate the opening of its Lebanese office under Bazerji Motors SAL. On 29 May 2015, GAC Group partnered with Doha Marketing and Services Company (DOMASCO), to market and sell their vehicles to the local customers in the Middle East.

On 20 November 2020, GAC Group established a branch in Chile.

On 10 June 2025, GAC Group officially opened its Indonesia factory in Purwakarta with a production capacity of 20,000 cars annually.

On 18 November 2025, GAC Group launched in Australia.

GAC Group international markets
Year of introduction	Territory	Brands	Local partner	References
2013	Kuwait	GAC Motor; GAC Aion (2025–present)	Mutawa Alkazi Company	
May 2014	Lebanon	GAC Motor	Bazerji Motors Sal	
November 2014	Nigeria	GAC Motor		
October 2015	Bahrain	GAC Motor	Tasheelat Automotive Company	
October 2018	United Arab Emirates	GAC Motor	Gargash Group	
November 2018	Philippines	GAC Motor	Legado Motors Inc. (LMI)	
November 2018	Saudi Arabia	GAC Motor	Al Jomaih Automotive	
May 2019	Ecuador	GAC Motor	Impofactor CA	
August 2019	Cambodia, Laos, Panama	GAC Motor	TH Group (Cambodia), VK Group, Laos Group Auto Commercial (Panama)	
December 2019	Russia	GAC Motor	Direct subsidiary	
September 2023	Thailand	GAC Aion; GAC Motor (2025–present)	Direct subsidiary	
January 2024	Malaysia	GAC Aion; GAC Motor	Tan Chong Motor	
July 2024	Indonesia	GAC Aion; GAC Motor (2025–present)	Indomobil	
May 2025	Brazil	GAC Motor		
May 2026	Pakistan	GAC Motor	Lucky Motor	

== Sponsorships ==
GAC was the sponsor of the 2011 World Table Tennis Championships held in Rotterdam and the title sponsor of the 2012 ITTF World Tour.

GAC was the title sponsor of the 2013 World Team Cup Table Tennis tournament held in its home city of Guangzhou.

== See also ==
- Automobile manufacturers and brands of China
- List of automobile manufacturers of China
- Automotive industry in China
