= Denway Motors =

Investment company in Hong Kong

Denway Motors Limited 駿威汽車有限公司
- Type: Subsidiary
- Traded as: SEHK: 203
- Industry: Automobile
- Founded: 1992; 34 years ago
- Headquarters: Hong Kong
- Area served: People's Republic of China
- Key people: Chairman: Mr. Zhang Fangyou
- Parent: Guangzhou Automobile Group
- Website: Denway Motors Limited

Denway Motors Limited is a corporate holding company listed in Hong Kong. It engages in the manufacturing, assembly and trading of motor vehicles and automotive equipment and parts in China and Hong Kong through its group companies. It owns 50% of Guangqi Honda, a joint venture with Honda in Guangzhou, China.

The company's shares were oversubscribed more than 600 times when it was first listed in Hong Kong. In 2010, shareholders approved the privatization of Denway Motors by its parent company, Guangzhou Automobile Group. Denway Motors was delisted on 25 August 2010, replaced by the listing of Guangzhou Automobile Group on 30 August 2010 via stock swap.
